= REGI Base Foundation =

- Nadační fond REGI Base I.
- Abbreviation: NFRB
- Formation: April 22, 2011
- Founders: Hynek Čech; Martin Jirsa; Jindra Pavlová (o. p. s.)^{+}
- Type: NPO, INGO
- Legal status: Foundation
- Purpose: Humanitarian
- Headquarters: Konviktská 291/24; Prague 1-Staré Město, 110 00; REGI Base I. Svémyslice; Svémyslice 259/3, 262, 263; Praha-východ, 250 91; REGI BASE Start o. p. s.^{+} Vinohradská 938/37; Prague 2-Vinohrady, 120 00
- Region served: CZ, CO, CG, ME, UKR, SK, US
- Key people: CWO Jiří Schams
- Main organ: Board of directors
- Website: www.regibase.cz

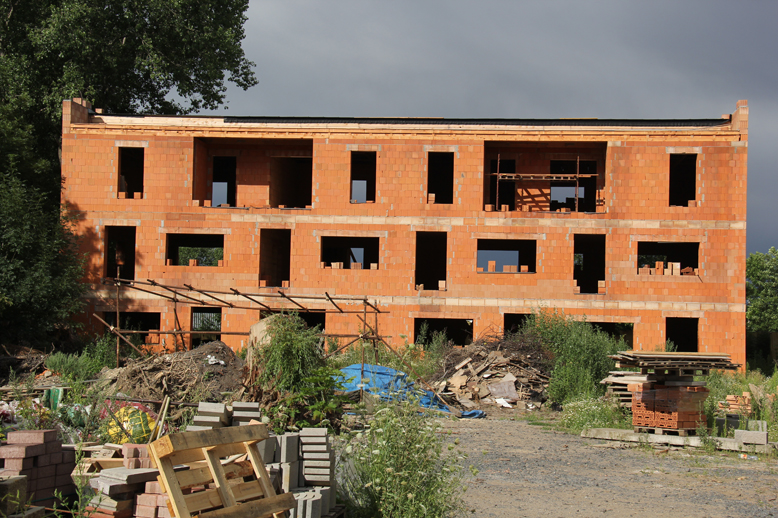
The REGI Base facility, in July 2012, currently under construction within the town of Svémyslice.

The REGI Base Foundation is a nonprofit organization based in Prague, Czech Republic, which provides medical treatment for veterans of foreign wars.

With a facility currently being constructed in Svémyslice, Czech Republic.

The intent is to provide a location where wounded warriors can receive year-round care if they cannot be treated at home or by the state.

== Origins ==
The inspiration for REGI Base Foundation came after Chief Warrant Officer Jiří (Regi) Schams was severely wounded during a suicide attack in March 2008 in the Helmand province of Afghanistan. Regi himself had little chance for survival after the attack, but showed signs of improvement after several months of treatment. Regi used a wheelchair due to his brain injury that had affected his motor skills and coordination. Regi died on January 7, 2015, due to complications from cancer. His legacy and inspiration live on to continue the treatment and care for wounded veterans from across the globe.

== Current projects ==
=== Project Svémyslice ===
The aim of the foundation is to build a facility in the Czech Republic with equipment to provide care and rehabilitation to veterans with disabilities. This will provide for social, health, and cultural rehabilitation.

Upon completion, the complex will include a dedicated medical section and provide housing units for long-term therapy clients and hotel-type rooms (for the accommodation of visitors).

The center will be open to veterans from both NATO member states and other international armed forces.

== Board of directors ==
Czech Republic

- Jindra Pavlová — chairwoman; CEO (o. p. s.)
- Miroslav Nosek — member
- Jakub Pětioký — member
- Petra Spilková — member (o. p. s.)
- Josef Dvořák — member (o. p. s.)

United States

- Hynek Čech — International Affairs Officer

(Taken from the CR registered at the Municipal Court in Prague, Czech Republic.

== Criticism ==
In 2019, the organization was criticized in the Czech media after it registered a trademark for the symbol of veterans, the Remembrance poppy, with a tricolour. REGI Base was then asking other non-governmental organizations, such as Post Bellum, to stop using the symbol, sometimes with a legal action notice.
