= Prague Congress Centre =

Building in Czechia

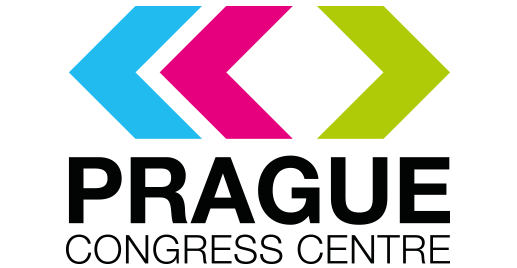

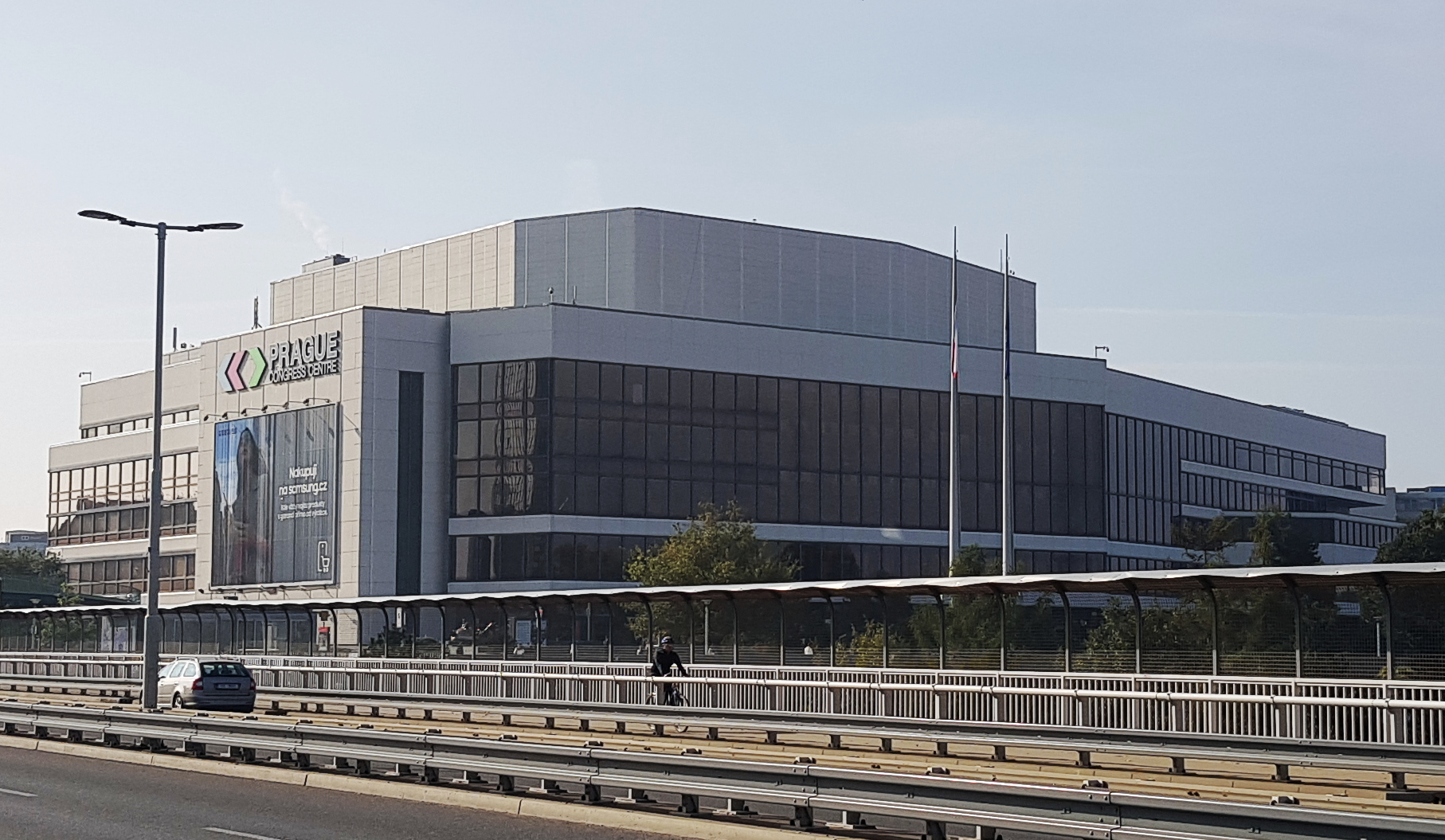
- Interactive map of Prague Congress Centre
- Former names: Palace of culture Pragu (1981–1995)
- Address: 5. května 1640/65
- Location: Nusle, Prague 4, Czech Republic
- Coordinates: 50.0614°N 14.4297°E

Construction
- Built: 1976–1981
- Renovated: 1998–2000

Prague Congress Centre (Czech: Kongresové centrum Praha, shortly KCP), originally Palace of culture Prague (Czech: Palác kultury), is a large neofunctionalist building in Czech Republic capital Prague 4 district Nusle, located on the edge of Nusle Valley (Czech: Nuselské údolí), near to the Nusle Bridge and Prague Metro C station Vyšehrad. There are 70 halls, lounges and meeting rooms of various sizes in this building, with total capacity of 9,300 people.

Biggest of them; Congress hall (Czech: Kongresový sál) has maximum capacity of 2,764 people. Mainly congresses, musicals, meetings, festivals, and concerts are normally held in this building.

== History ==
Construction of Prague Congress Centre started in 1976, it was opened in 1981 as Palace of culture Prague. Opening event was attended by Czechoslovak president Gustav Husák. In 1995, it was renamed to current name Prague Congress Centre. Between 1998 and 2000 refurbishment and completion of this building was completed.

== Notable events ==
- 2000 – 55th International Monetary Fund and World Bank meeting
- 2002 – NATO summit
- 2015 – EUROMAR meeting
- 2017 – Rocky (musical)
- 2018 – FEBS congress
- 2023 – 20th International Congress of Phonetic Sciences (ICPhS)
- 2023, 2024 Forum 2000
