= Stolpersteine in Prague-Nusle =

Memorial installations in Czech Republic

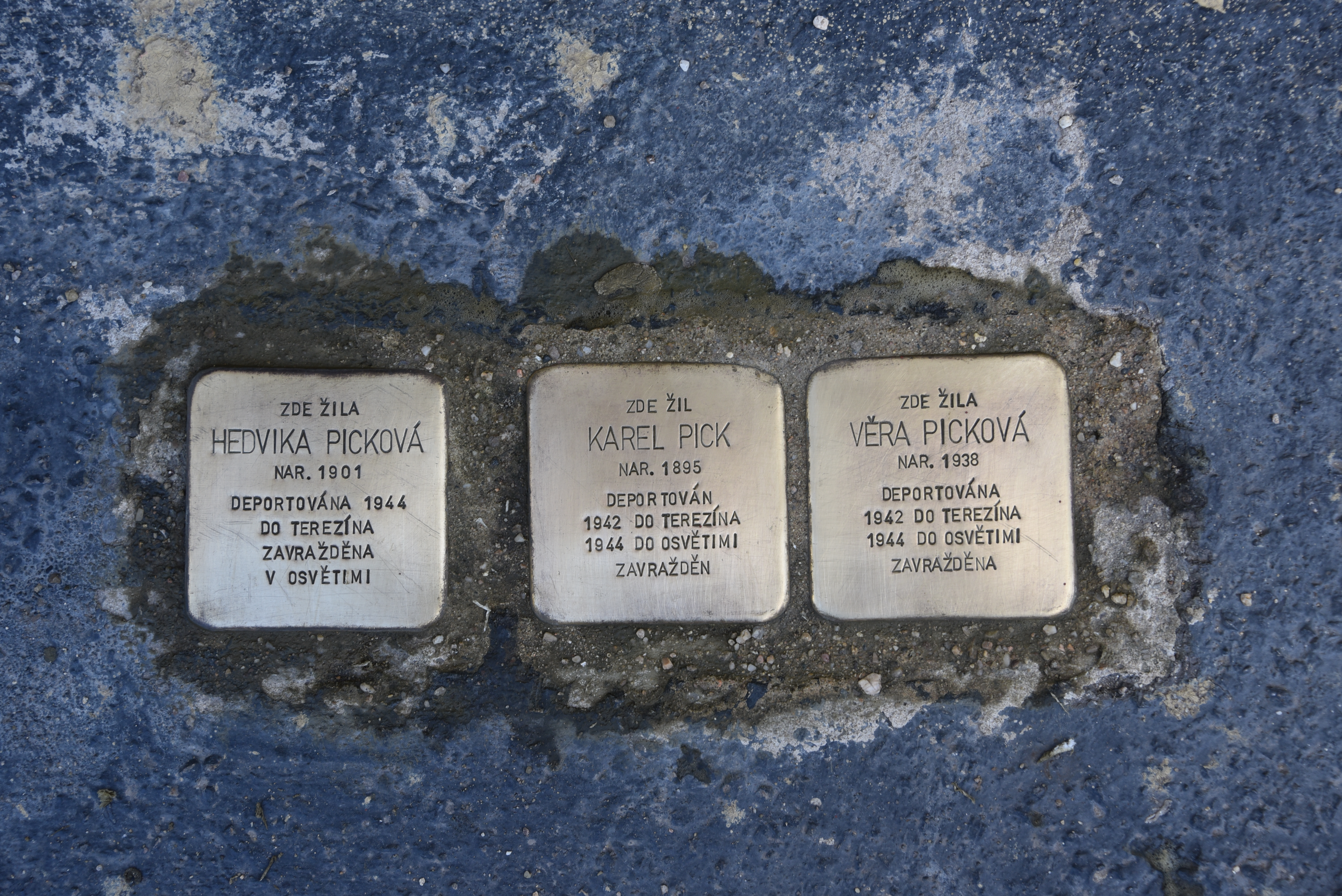
Stolpersteine for family Pick in Prague-Nusle

This article lists the Stolpersteine in the district Nusle (Czech pronunciation: [ˈnuslɛ]) of Prague. The district has been split off. Since 2002 it belongs mainly to Praha 4, but parts of it are now in Praha 2. Stolpersteine is the German name for stumbling blocks collocated all over Europe by German artist Gunter Demnig. They remember the fate of the Nazi victims being murdered, deported, exiled or driven to suicide.

Generally, the stumbling blocks are posed in front of the building where the victims had their last self chosen residence. The name of the Stolpersteine in Czech is: Kameny zmizelých, stones of the disappeared.

== Nusle ==
Stone	Inscription	Location	Life and death
	HERE LIVED; EDITH EHRLICHOVÁ; BORN 1928; DEPORTED 1942; TO THERESIENSTADT; MURDERED; IN SOBIBOR	Oldřichova 172/52; Praha 2-Nusle	Edith Ehrlichová was born on 11 May 1928. Her last residence before deportation was Oldřichova 52 in Prague XIV. On 7 May 1942 she was deported from Prague to Theresienstadt concentration camp with Transport At. Her transport number was 179 of 1,001. Two days later she was transferred to Sobibór extermination camp. Her transport number was 179 of 999. There she was murdered by the Nazi regime.
	HERE LIVED; VĚRA LEBENHARTOVÁ; BORN 1928; DEPORTED 1942; TO THERESIENSTADT; MURDERED; IN IZBICA	Oldřichova 172/52; Praha 2-Nusle	Vӗra Lebenhartová was born on 27 February 1928. Her last residence before deportation was Oldřichova 52 in Prague XIV. On 8 February 1942 she was deported from Prague to Theresienstadt concentration camp with Transport W. Her transport number was 15 of 1,002. On 17 March 1942 she was deported to Izbica. Her transport number was 440 of 1,000. There she was murdered by the Nazi regime.
	HERE LIVED; KAREL PICK; BORN 1895; DEPORTED; 1942 TO THERESIENSTADT; 1944 TO AUSCHWITZ; MURDERED	Lumírova 525/1; Praha 2-Nusle	Karel Pick was born on 4 November 1895. His last residence before deportation was in Prague XIV, Brusova 1. On 24 October 1942, Karel Pick was deported from Prague to Theresienstadt concentration camp with Transport Ca. His transport number was 238 of 1,004. On 18 May 1944, he was deported to Auschwitz concentration camp by transport Eb. His transport number was 342 of 2,500. Karel Pick was murdered by the Nazi regime in the course of the Shoah
	HERE LIVED; HEDVIKA PICKOVÁ; BORN 1901; DEPORTED 1944; TO THERESIENSTADT; MURDERED; IN AUSCHWITZ	Lumírova 525/1; Praha 2-Nusle	Hedvika Picková was born on 11 June 1901. On 10 January 1944, she was deported from Prague to Theresienstadt with Transport Dt. Her transport number was 27 of 143. On 18 May 1944, she was deported to Auschwitz concentration camp by transport Eb. Her transport number was 343 of 2,500. Hedvika Picková was murdered by the Nazi regime in the course of the Shoah
	HERE LIVED; VĚRA PICKOVÁ; BORN 1938; DEPORTED; 1942 TO THERESIENSTADT; 1944 TO AUSCHWITZ; MURDERED	Lumírova 525/1; Praha 2-Nusle	Vera Picková was born on 20 December 1938. On 24 October 1942 she was deported from Prague to Theresienstadt concentration camp with Transport Ca. Her transport number was 239 of 1,004. On 18 May 1944, she was deported to Auschwitz concentration camp by transport Eb. Her transport number was 344 of 2,500. Vera Picková was murdered by the Nazi regime in the course of the Shoah.

== Dates of collocations ==
According to the website of Gunter Demnig the Stolpersteine of Prague were posed on 8 October 2008, 7 November 2009, 12 June 2010, 13 to 15 July 2011 and on 17 July 2013 by the artist himself. A further collocation occurred on 28 October 2012, but is not mentioned on Demnig's page.

The Czech Stolperstein project was initiated in 2008 by the Česká unie židovské mládeže (Czech Union of Jewish Youth) and was realized with the patronage of the Mayor of Prague.

== See also ==
- List of cities by country that have stolpersteine
