= Albína Dratvová =

Czech philosopher, associate professor of philosophy (1892-1969)

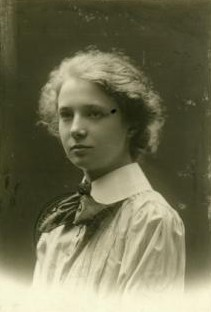
- Dratvová in 1913
- Born: 2 February 1892; Prague-Vinohrady, Austria-Hungary
- Died: 1 December 1969 (aged 77); Prague, Czechoslovakia
- Education: Faculty of Arts, Charles University in Prague

Albína Dratvová (2 January 1892 – 1 December 1969) was a Czech philosopher, associate professor of philosophy at Charles University, one of the first few women to be habilitated during the First Czechoslovak Republic. She devoted herself to natural philosophy and methodology, the relationship between natural sciences and positivism. She also contributed significantly with her positions to the emancipation movement of modern women.

== Biography ==
Dratvová was born in Prague and studied at the State Women's Teacher's Institute there, from which she graduated in 1911. Then in 1913 she graduated from the Prague Academic Gymnasium. In the years 1913–1917 she studied mathematics and philosophy at Charles University and in 1917, and became one of the first women to graduate from the university in 1918. With her degree, she became qualified to teach philosophy and mathematics at higher schools as well as physics at lower secondary schools.

In 1918, Dratvová defended her Latin dissertation on Descartes' ethics with Prof. František Krejčí and Prof. František Čády and received the title of PhD. In 1927 she published two textbooks for high school students: Logic - 1927 and Philosophical propaedeutics - 1927, Introduction to philosophy for realists and reform grammar schools.

She still longed for scientific work. After earning her habilitation in the philosophy of natural sciences, she lectured at the Faculty of Science of the Charles University as a private docent.

In 1927, she was accepted at the Ministry of Education and National Education in the pedagogical department and rose to become a leader of the organization. Before the end of the 1930s, she summarized her thoughts in her book Philosophy and Natural Science Knowledge. She remained employed at the Ministry until the German occupation of Czechoslovakia in 1938, when she applied for retirement.

=== World War II years ===
On 6 January 1941, due to major disagreements with the representatives of the Catholic Church, Dratvová transferred to the Czech Evangelical Church, which was closer to her than other churches. During the years 1941–1947, she worked as an editor of the magazine Česká mysl.

She demonstrated her post-war activities as part of the Philosophical Unity group. (She described her life experiences in a study published in the Philosophical Journal in 1966.)

Another big turning point in her life was the period from 1948 when the Communist Party came to power. It was very difficult for her to work within the new arrangements and obstacles both professionally and personally. Especially on the grounds of the university, she was neglected and her life was miserable and incompatible with her work focus. Philosophical articles and publications seemed superfluous and unnecessary to the government ideologues when the only recognized philosophy was Marxism.

=== Personal life ===
Like most female high school professors at the time, Dratvová remained unmarried. She was one of the first women working in science, so she was well aware of the difficulties that women need to overcome when building a scientific career. She discussed social and ethical conflicts within the family. Among other things, she dealt with the conflict of women "profession vs. family" and asked herself questions about the meaning of life and ethics.

In the years 1921–1961, she wrote a personal diary in which she recorded her thoughts and opinions in connection with political events in a unique way. In her diary, during the Communist years, Dratvová wrote: We are saturated with mistrust, uncertainty, fear, both sides: the oppressed and the oppressor.

Her education, enthusiasm, diligence and determination, accompanying her throughout her active life, did not bring recognition. She died in a retirement home in Terezín, 1 December 1969.
