= Nusle Bridge =

Bridge in Prague

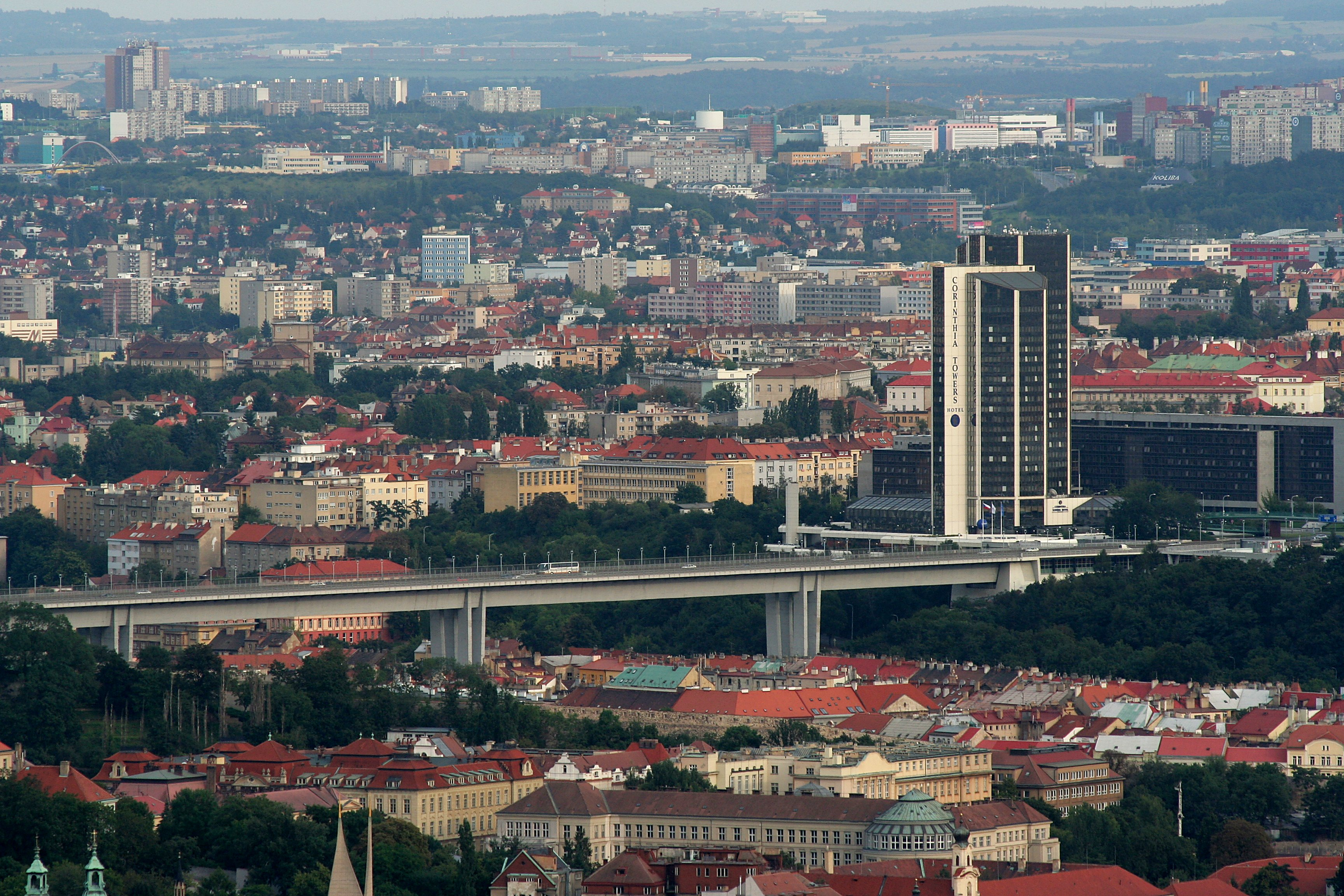
- Nusle Bridge with Corinthia Towers hotel and Vyšehrad station being seen by the hotel
- Coordinates: 50°03′57″N 14°25′50″E
- Carries: 6 lanes of roadway, 2 tracks of Prague Metro Line C, pedestrians
- Crosses: Nusle Valley
- Locale: Prague
- Official name: Nuselský most

Characteristics
- Design: prestressed concrete hollow box haunched cantilever bridge
- Total length: 485 metres (1,591 ft)
- Width: 26.5 metres (87 ft)
- Longest span: 115.5 metres (379 ft)
- Clearance below: 42.5 metres (139 ft)

History
- Construction start: 1967
- Opened: 22 February 1973

Location
- Interactive map of Nusle Bridge

Nusle Bridge (Czech: Nuselský most) is a prestressed concrete viaduct in Prague, Czech Republic. It connects Prague 2 and Prague 4, across a valley which forms part of the Nusle district. The bridge is one of the longest in the country and carries two footpaths, a multi-lane road and part of the city's metro network.

The bridge links the city center to its south-eastern districts such as Pankrác, and joins the D1 motorway leading to Brno. It is crucial to Prague's transportation network, since almost all north-south traffic flows across it. Below the six-lane highway on the surface, lies part of Prague Metro Line C between I.P. Pavlova and Vyšehrad stations.

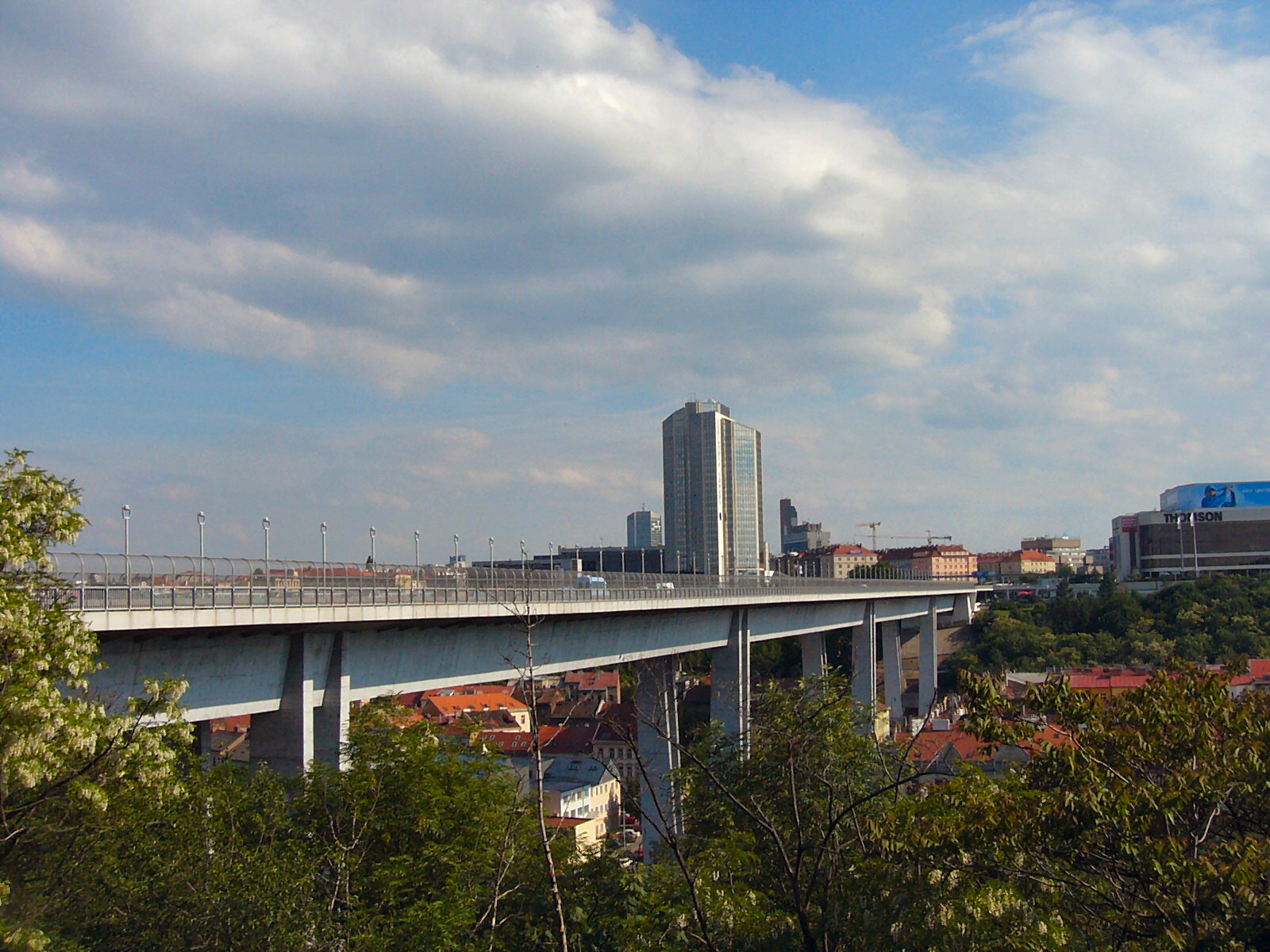
View from the north

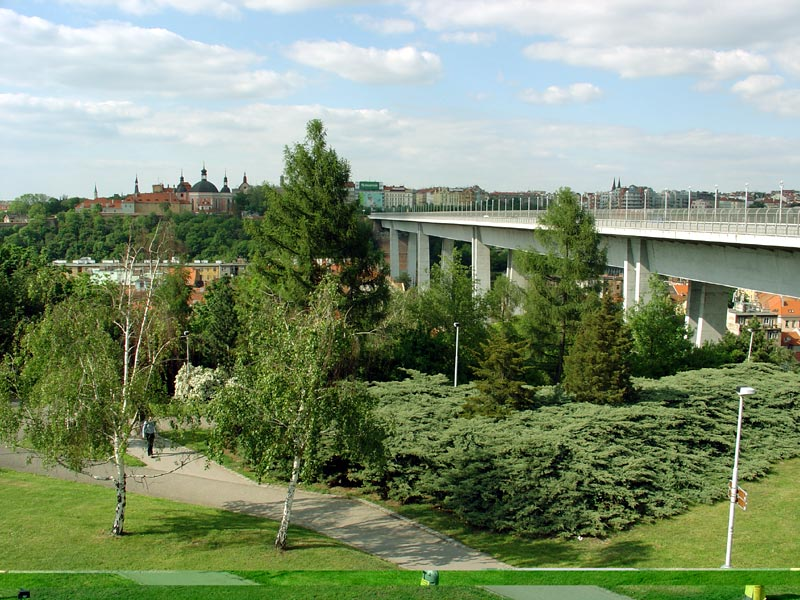
View from the south

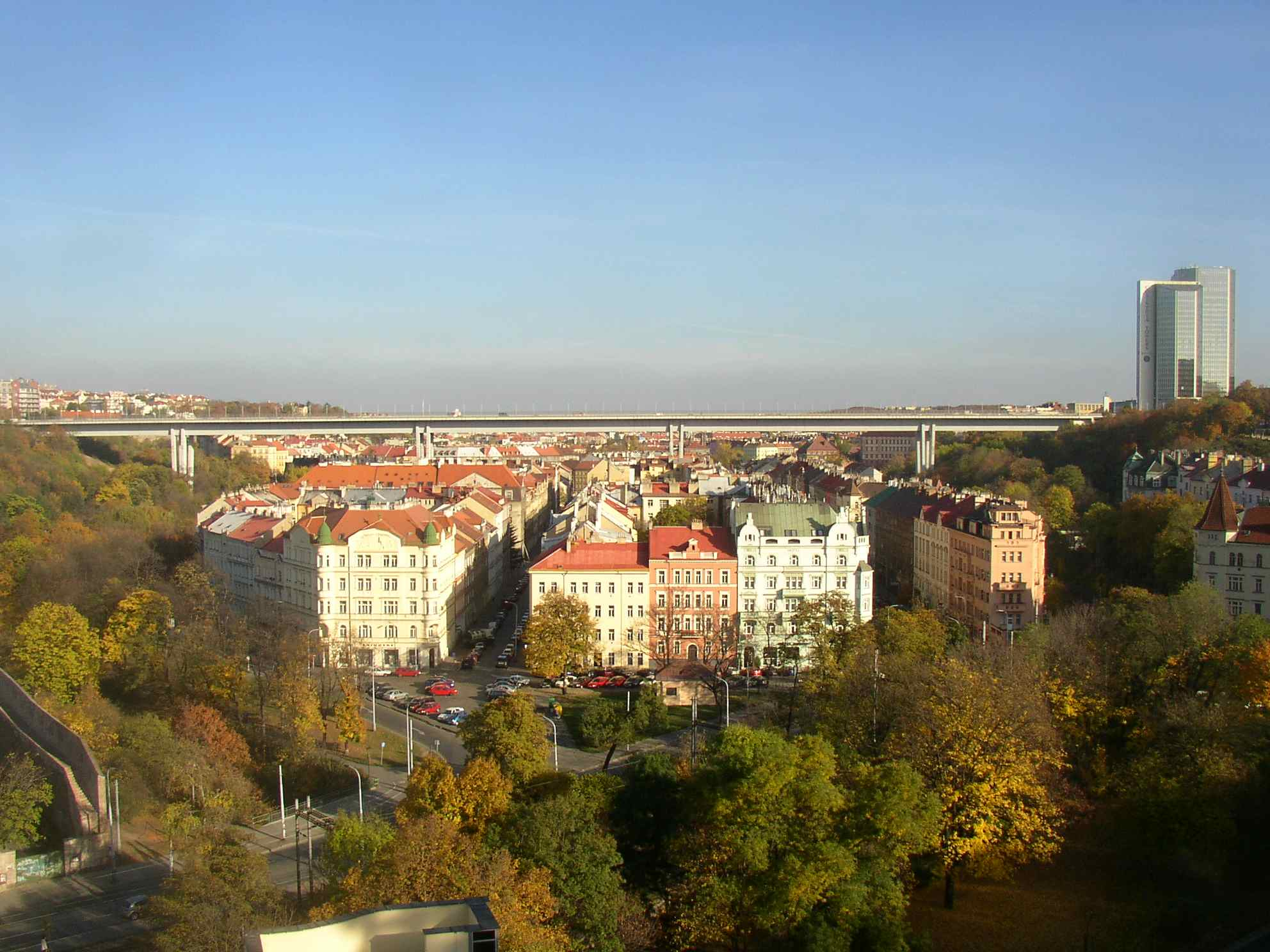
View from the west (from Vyšehrad)

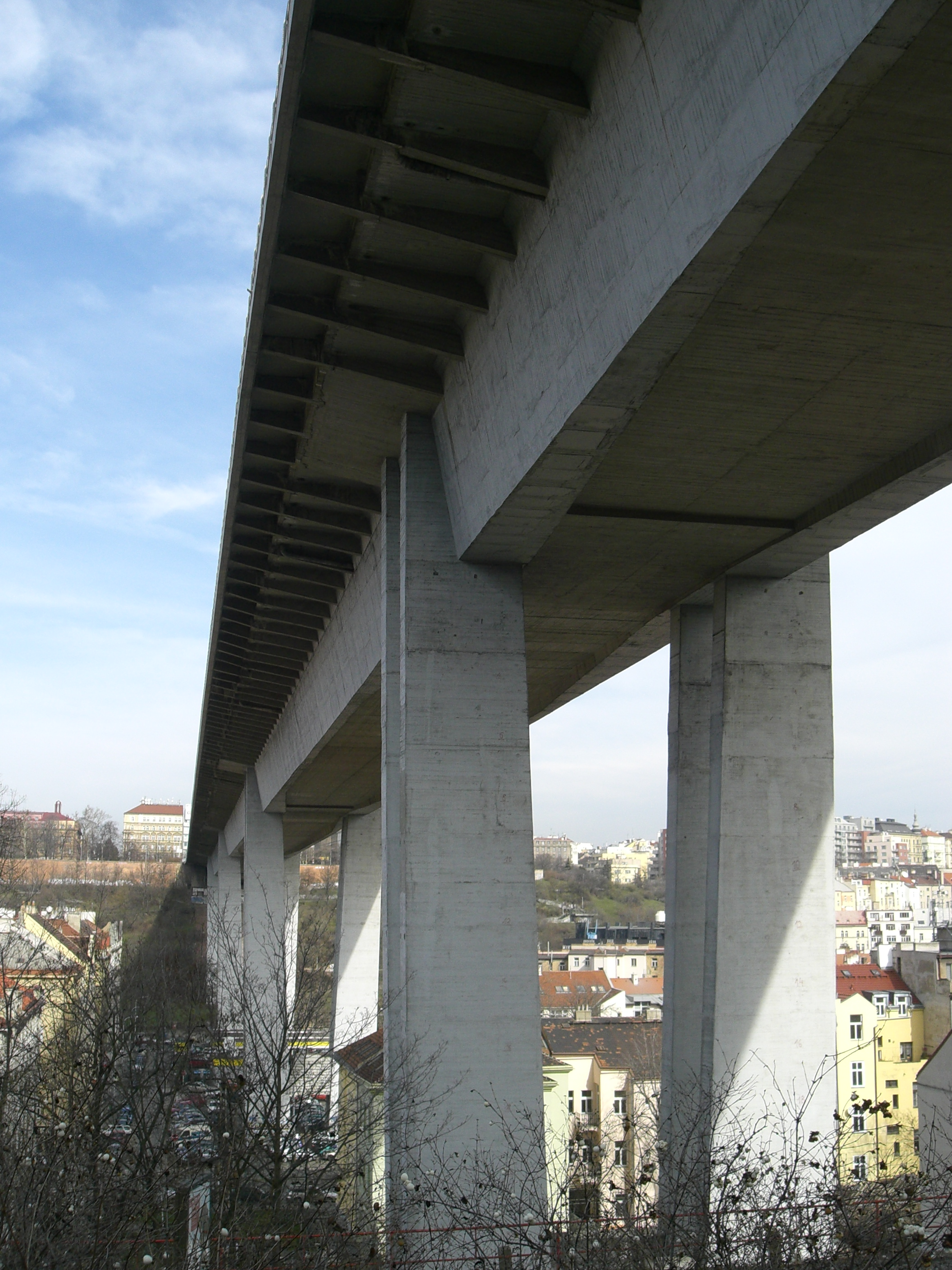
View from below

== Description ==
The bridge is 485 metres long and 26.5 metres wide, consisting of a reinforced concrete structure with four pillars. Two sections of the bridge span 68.5m and the other three span 115.5m. The average height above the valley is 42.5m. The conduit for the metro line C has a trapezoidal cross section, with a height of almost 6.5 m and wall thickness from 30 to 110 cm. The road is illuminated by lamps mounted in the central reservation.

== Position ==
The bridge crosses, among other things, Folimanka Park, the Botič stream, and the railway line from Prague main station to Smíchov. The majority of the bridge belongs to the administrative district of Prague 2. The section which lies to the south of the railway track below, however, belongs to Prague 4.

== History ==
Construction began in 1967 and it opened on 22 February 1973 under the name Klement Gottwald Bridge (Czech: Most Klementa Gottwalda), honouring the late communist revolutionary and former president Klement Gottwald.

== Suicides ==
A total of 200 to 300 people have been recorded to have taken their own life by jumping from the bridge, garnering the nickname "Suicide bridge". Since 2011, the deceased have been commemorated in the monument named Of One's Own Volition by Krištof Kintera, in the park below.

The bridge was originally constructed with only a 1m high railing. In response to the high casualty rate, a 1.5m wide safety net was installed underneath the railing. Between 1996 and 1997, further fencing was added, heightening the barrier to 2.7 m. In 2007, the fencing was topped off with another meter of polished metal to make it near-impossible to climb.
