= Vyšehrad (Prague Metro) =

Prague metro station

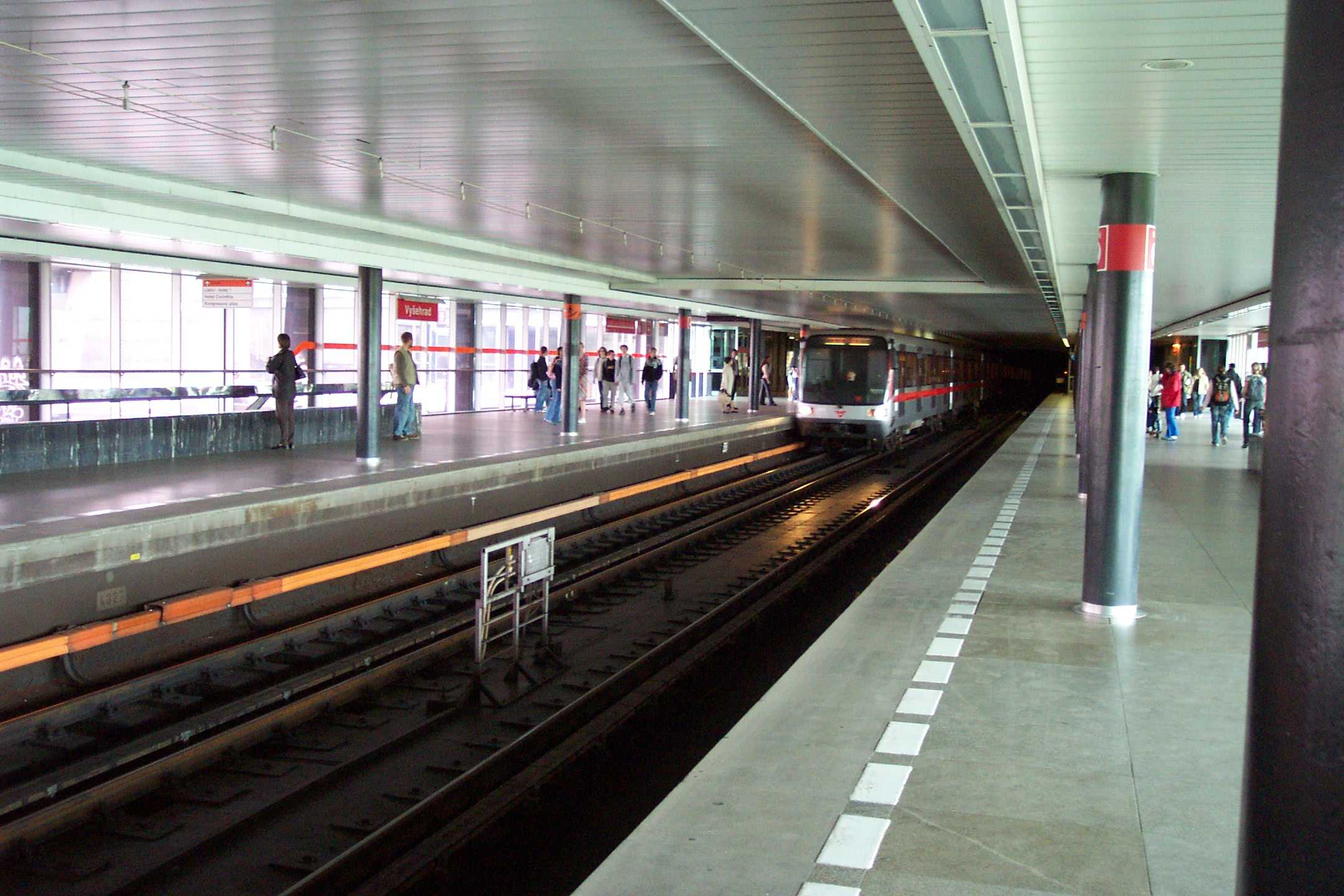

General information
- Location: Nuselský most Prague 4 - Nusle; Prague; Czech Republic
- Coordinates: 50.063°N 14.431°E
- Owner: Dopravní podnik hl. m. Prahy
- Line: C
- Platforms: 2 side platforms
- Tracks: 2

Construction
- Structure type: Surface level (Note: Partially underground)
- Platform levels: 1
- Cycle facilities: No
- Accessible: Yes

History
- Opened: 9 May 1974

Services
Preceding station	Prague Metro	Following station
I. P. Pavlova toward Letňany	Line C	Pražského povstání toward Háje
Location
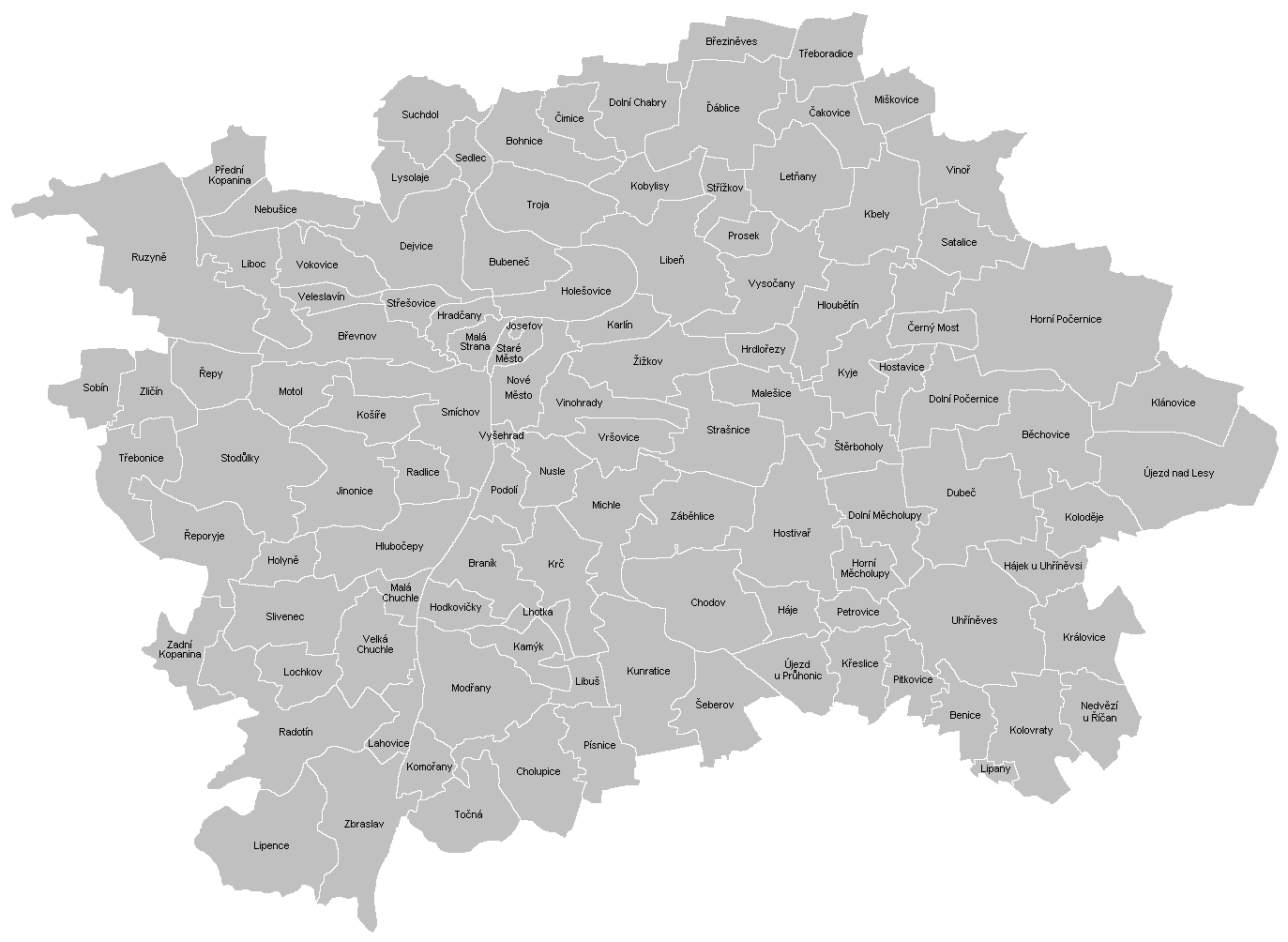
- Location within Prague Location within Greater Prague Location within Czech Republic

Vyšehrad (Czech pronunciation: [ˈvɪʃɛɦrat]) is a Prague Metro station on Line C, located at the south end of Nusle Bridge.

The station was opened on 9 May 1974 with the first section of Prague Metro, between Sokolovská and Kačerov. The station serves Vyšehrad and was formerly known as Gottwaldova (the previous working name was "Nuselský most"). It is near the Prague Congress Centre and the Corinthia Hotel Tower. Vyšehrad castle is also accessible from this station on foot.
