= Prague 2 =

Municipal district in Prague, Czechia

Prague 2 Praha 2
- Municipal District of Prague; Administrative District of Prague
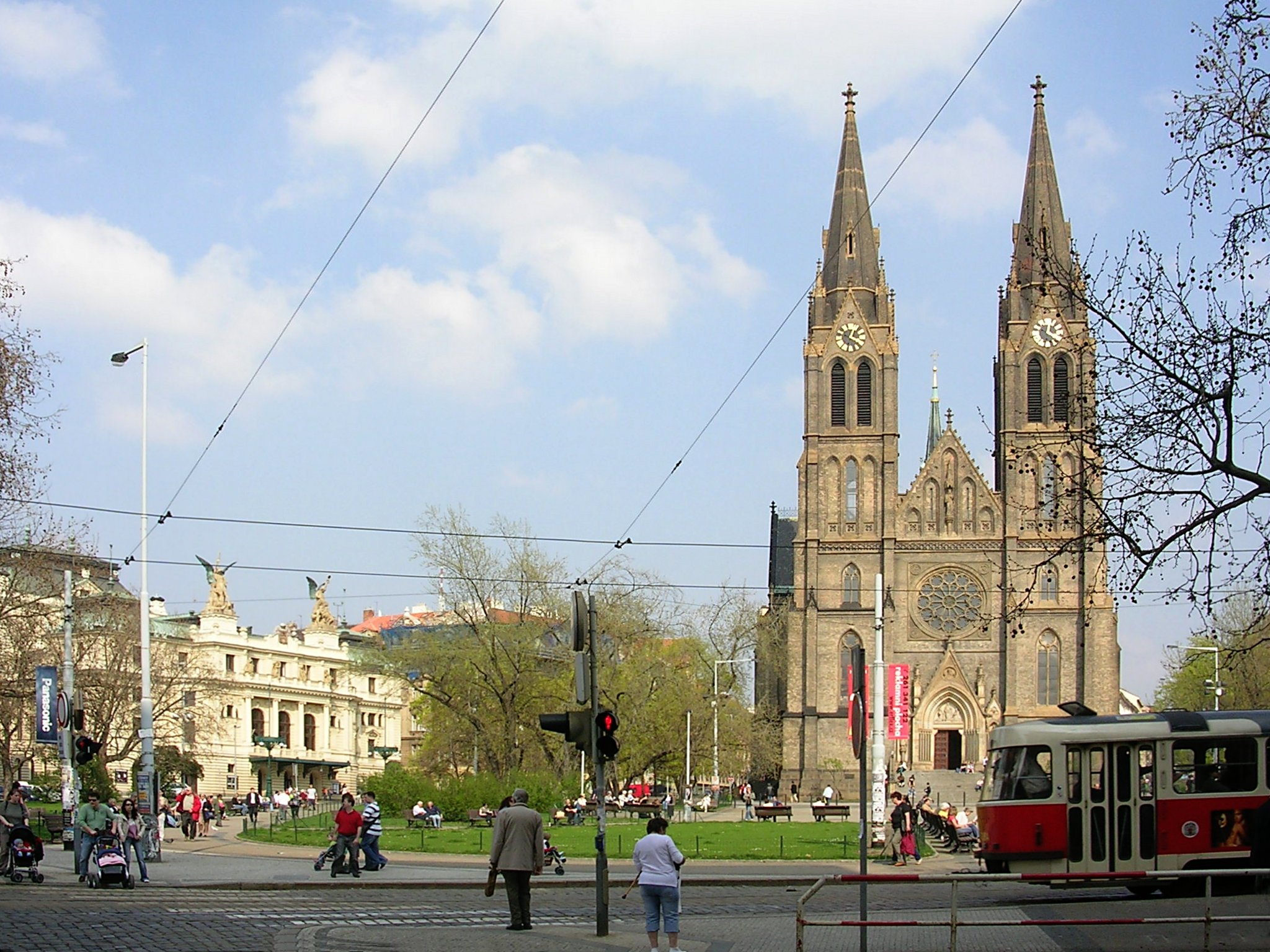
- Náměstí Míru ("Peace Square")

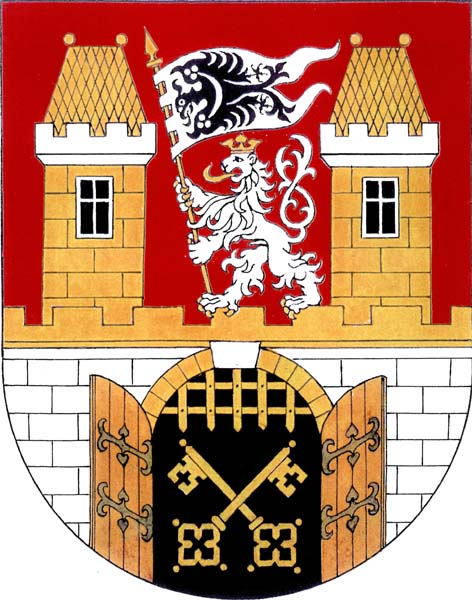
- Flag Coat of arms Logo

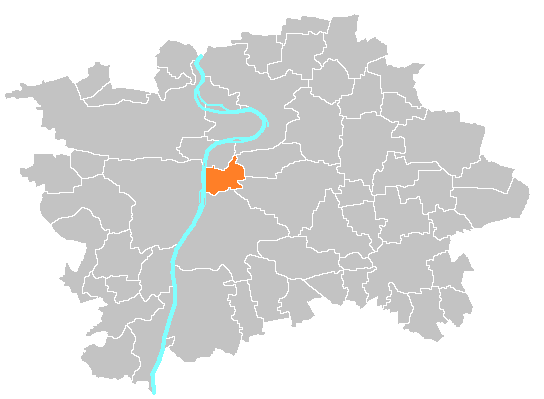
- Location of Prague 2 in Prague
- Country: Czech Republic
- Region: Prague

Government
  - Mayor: Jan Korseska (ODS)

Area
  - Total: 4.19 km^{2} (1.62 sq mi)

Population (2021)
  - Total: 45,405
  - Density: 10,800/km^{2} (28,100/sq mi)
- Time zone: UTC+1 (CET)
  - Summer (DST): UTC+2 (CEST)
- Postal code: 120 00
- Website: https://www.praha2.cz

Prague 2, formally the Prague 2 Municipal District (Městská čast Praha 2), is a second-tier municipality in Prague. It is co-extensive with the national administrative district (správní obvod) of the same name.

As of the end of 2004, 48,918 people lived in 34,689 homes in the district. At 4.19 km^{2} (1,035 acres), Prague 2 is the smallest administrative district in the country.

The district includes all of Vyšehrad and parts of Vinohrady, New Town and Nusle. The district has remained intact since its creation in 1960.

== Vyšehrad ==
Vyšehrad contains the Czech national cemetery and the ruins of a medieval fortress. It is considered the area of the historic establishment of the Czech rulers.

== Vinohrady ==
The historical center of Vinohrady also falls under the jurisdiction of Prague 2. Important sights include Riegrovy sady, one of the most famous Prague parks. The grand central plaza of Vinohrady is Náměstí Míru with the Vinohrady Theatre, the National House of Vinohrady and the main Prague 2 municipal building.

== Nové Město (New Town) ==
New Town is less a residential but a business area and known for the I.P. Pavlova station (locally known as "Pavlák") which connects Karlovo náměstí – and thus also New Town – with Náměstí Míru in Vinohrady. Tramlines cross here with Metro line C, as well as night buses and the main road bringing cars from the D1 highway directly to the centre and through to Holešovice in the north of the city. Important sites include Charles Square, the biggest square in Prague and also among the biggest squares in Europe - with the New City Hall / Gothic town hall, Church of Saints Cyril and Methodius, the Botanical Gardens and several Charles University buildings in Albertov, as well as the Baroque Villa America.

== Demographics ==
Historical population

| Year | Pop. | ±% |
|---|---|---|
| 1869 | 78,011 | — |
| 1880 | 93,017 | +19.2% |
| 1890 | 114,811 | +23.4% |
| 1900 | 142,294 | +23.9% |
| 1910 | 164,131 | +15.3% |

| Year | Pop. | ±% |
|---|---|---|
| 1921 | 176,166 | +7.3% |
| 1930 | 178,926 | +1.6% |
| 1950 | 174,522 | −2.5% |
| 1961 | 106,022 | −39.3% |
| 1970 | 92,206 | −13.0% |

| Year | Pop. | ±% |
|---|---|---|
| 1980 | 75,960 | −17.6% |
| 1991 | 61,873 | −18.5% |
| 2001 | 51,003 | −17.6% |
| 2011 | 48,773 | −4.4% |
| 2021 | 45,405 | −6.9% |

Source: Censuses

== Twin town ==
- Belváros-Lipótváros, Hungary

== See also ==
- Districts of Prague#Symbols
