= Svémyslice =

- Municipality
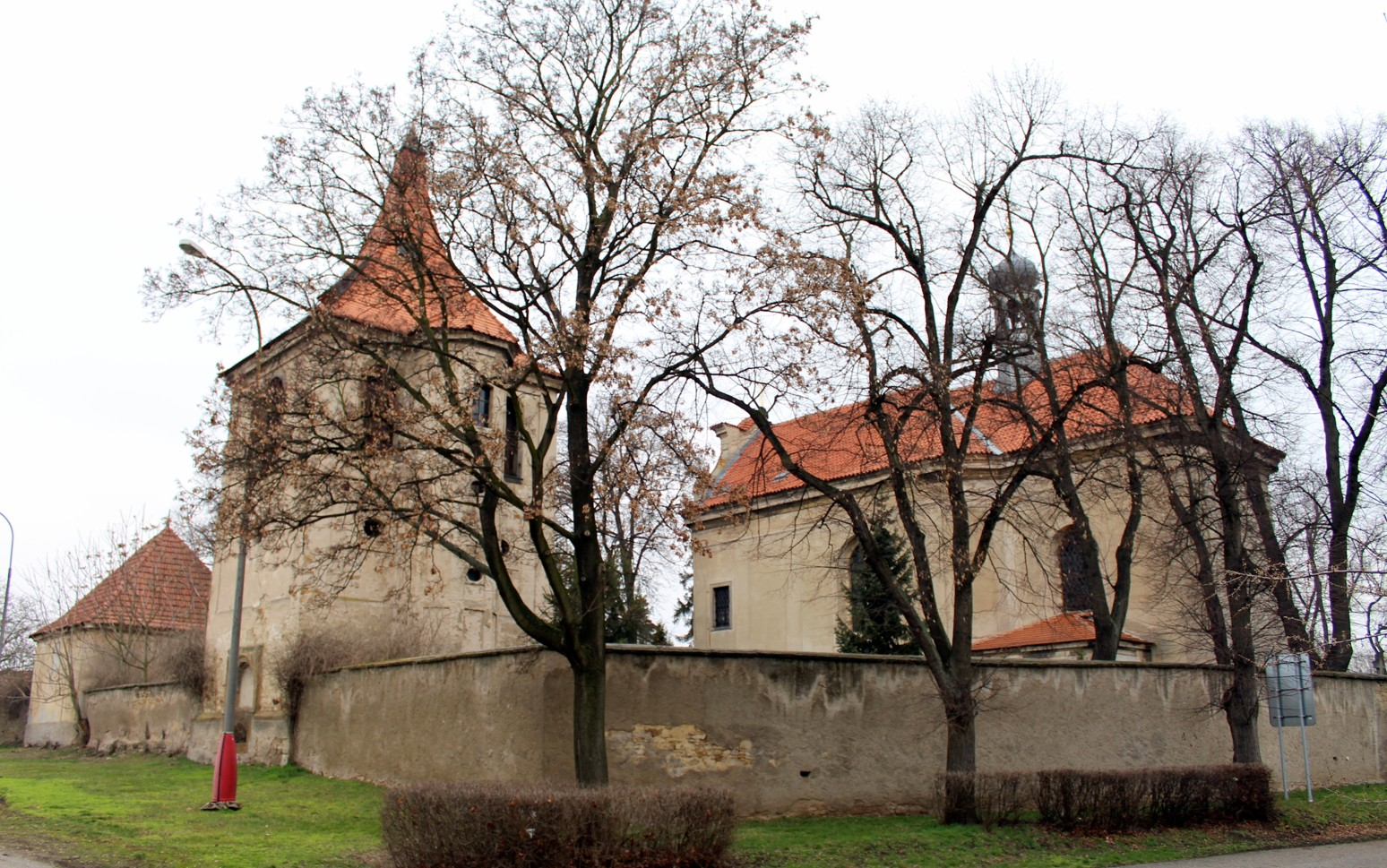
- Church of Saint Procopius

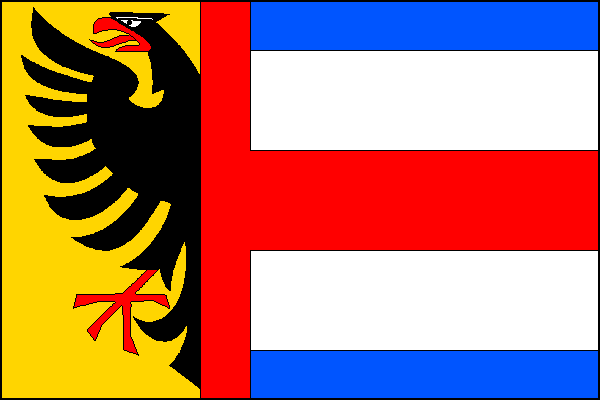
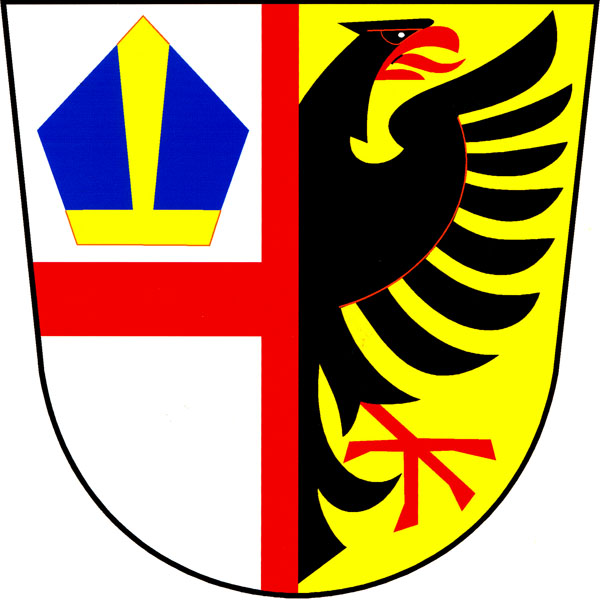
- Flag Coat of arms

- Location in the Czech Republic
- Coordinates: 50°8′46″N 14°38′53″E
- Country: Czech Republic
- Region: Central Bohemian
- District: Prague-East
- First mentioned: 1227

Area
  - Total: 3.45 km^{2} (1.33 sq mi)
- Elevation: 241 m (791 ft)

Population (2026-01-01)
  - Total: 599
  - Density: 174/km^{2} (450/sq mi)
- Time zone: UTC+1 (CET)
  - Summer (DST): UTC+2 (CEST)
- Postal code: 250 91
- Website: www.svemyslice.eu

Svémyslice is a municipality and village in Prague-East District in the Central Bohemian Region of the Czech Republic. It has about 600 inhabitants.

== Demographics ==
Historical population
Year	Pop.	±%
1869	120	—
1880	184	+53.3%
1890	244	+32.6%
1900	220	−9.8%
1910	225	+2.3%
1921	232	+3.1%
1930	185	−20.3%
1950	117	−36.8%
1961	158	+35.0%
1970	133	−15.8%
1980	137	+3.0%
1991	106	−22.6%
2001	109	+2.8%
2011	337	+209.2%
2021	574	+70.3%
Source: Censuses
