= I. P. Pavlova (Prague Metro) =

Prague metro station

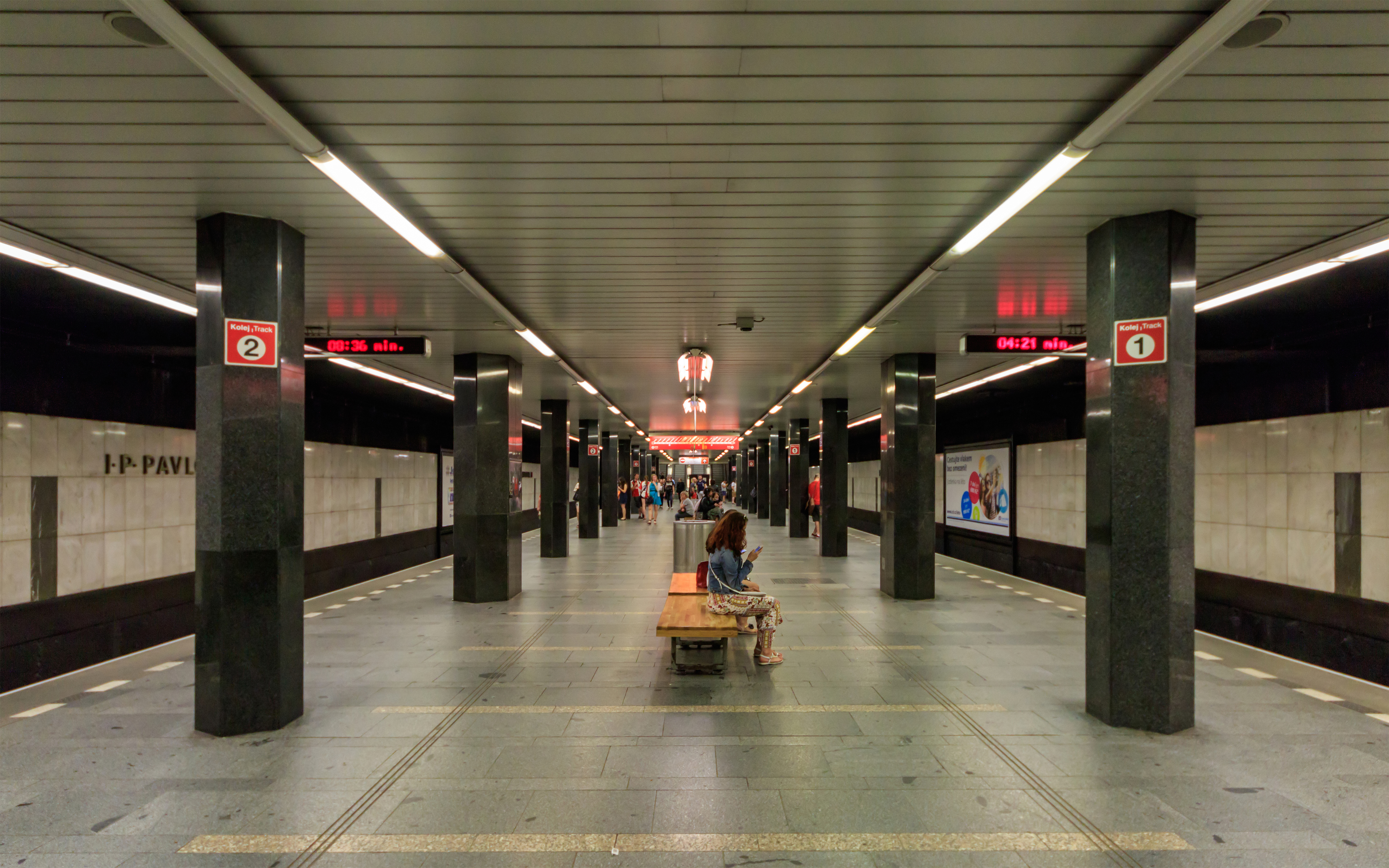
- platform

General information
- Location: Jugoslavská; Prague 2 - Vinohrady; Prague; Czech Republic
- Coordinates: 50.0743°N 14.4303°E
- Owner: Dopravní podnik hl. m. Prahy
- Line: C
- Platforms: Island platform
- Tracks: 2

Construction
- Structure type: Underground
- Platform levels: 1
- Cycle facilities: No
- Accessible: Yes

History
- Opened: 9 May 1974

Services
Preceding station	Prague Metro	Following station
Muzeum toward Letňany	Line C	Vyšehrad toward Háje
Location
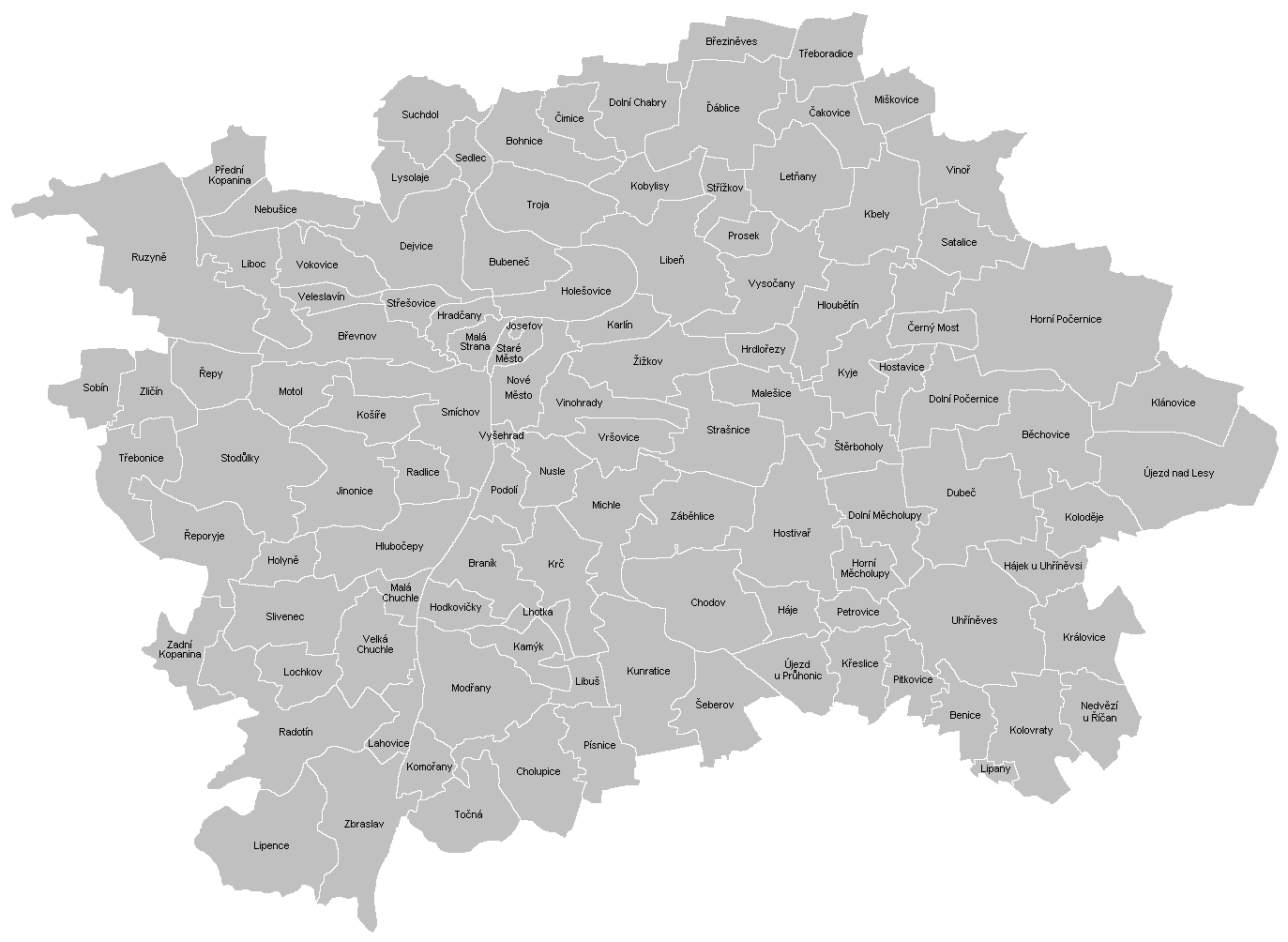
- Location within Prague Location within Greater Prague Location within Czech Republic

I. P. Pavlova (Czech pronunciation: [ˈiː ˈpɛː ˈpavlova]) is a Prague Metro station on Line C. It is in the Vinohrady district of Prague. Above the station is I. P. Pavlov Square (Czech: náměstí I. P. Pavlova), which is named after Russian physiologist Ivan Petrovich Pavlov. Both the station and the square are shortened by locals to diminutive names such as Ípák, Pavlák or Ípáč.

I. P. Pavlova is the busiest station on the Prague Metro, serving daily more than 118,000 people as of 2008.

== History ==
I. P. Pavlova station was opened on 9 May 1974, with the first section of Prague Metro, between Sokolovská and Kačerov. During construction of the station, the remains of a decorative sculpture of a Baroque bastion were found. This sculpture can now be seen next to the ticket office inside the station.

The station has an exit at one end of the platform, which had three escalators until reconstruction in the 1990s, when a fourth was introduced. In 2015, a lift was installed, enabling disabled access to the station from Legerova street. Construction of the new exit cost 64.7 million Czech koruna.

== Tram services ==
I. P. Pavlova is also a major tram stop on the Prague tram system. Trams connect I. P. Pavlova with Náměstí Míru on Line A and Karlovo náměstí on Line B. Tram services 4, 6, 10, 11, 16 and 22 (daytime services) stop at this station. At night I. P. Pavlova is also served by trams, with services 51, 56, 57 and 59.

== In popular culture ==
Part of the Czech sci-fi movie, Tomorrow I'll Wake Up and Scald Myself with Tea, was filmed in the vestibule of the metro station. The station is also the subject of a song by David Koller, entitled "Lajka z I.P. Pavlova".

Above the escalators there is a large-format illustration created in 2011, depicting passengers in the subway as anthropomorphic dogs. A figure in the foreground is holding a hamburger and a copy of Pavlov's book, The Experimental Psychology and Psychopathology of Animals.
