= Nusle =

District of Prague, Czech Republic

- Cadastral Area of Prague
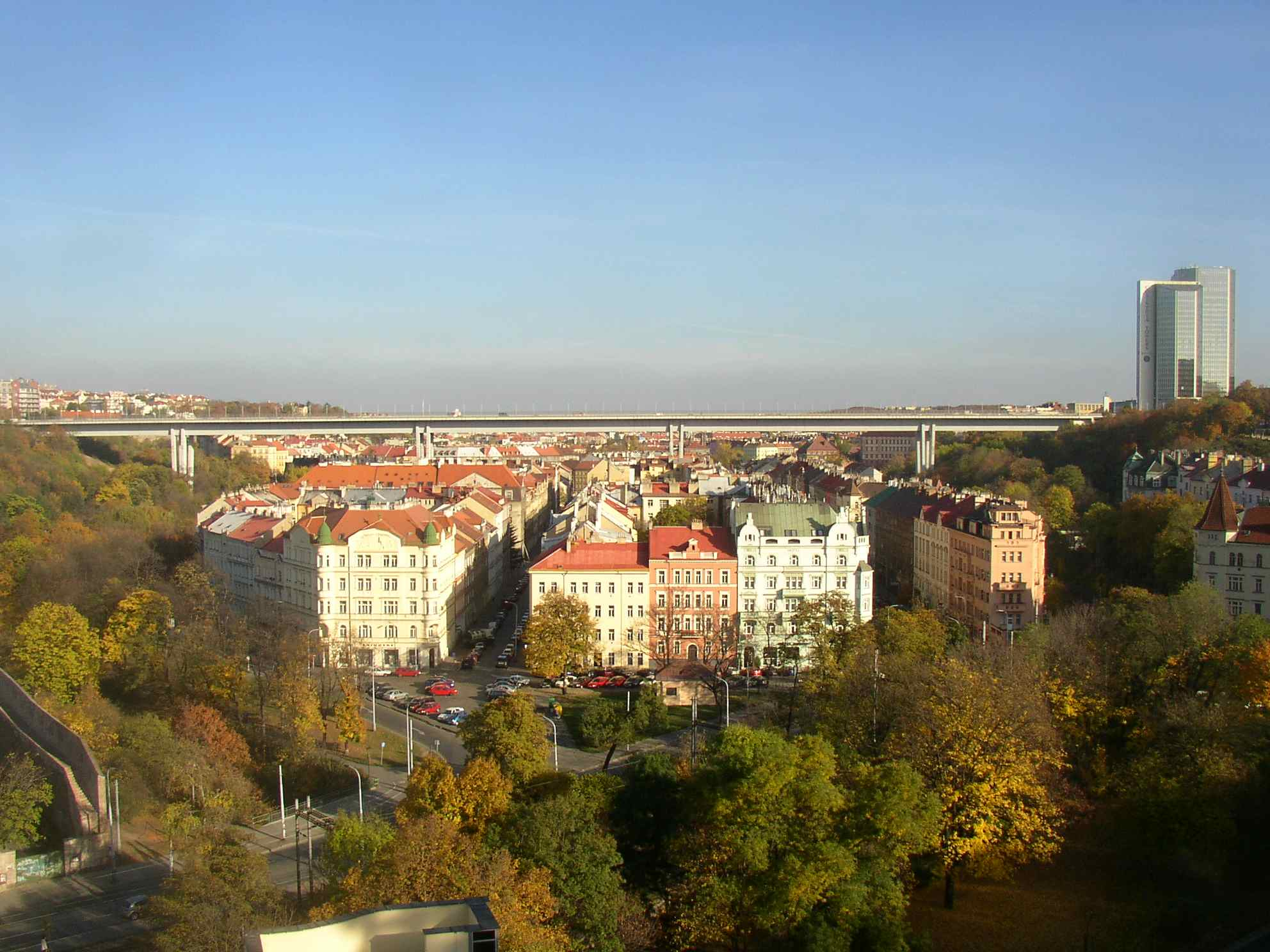
- Nuselský most spanning the valley as seen from walls of Vyšehrad.

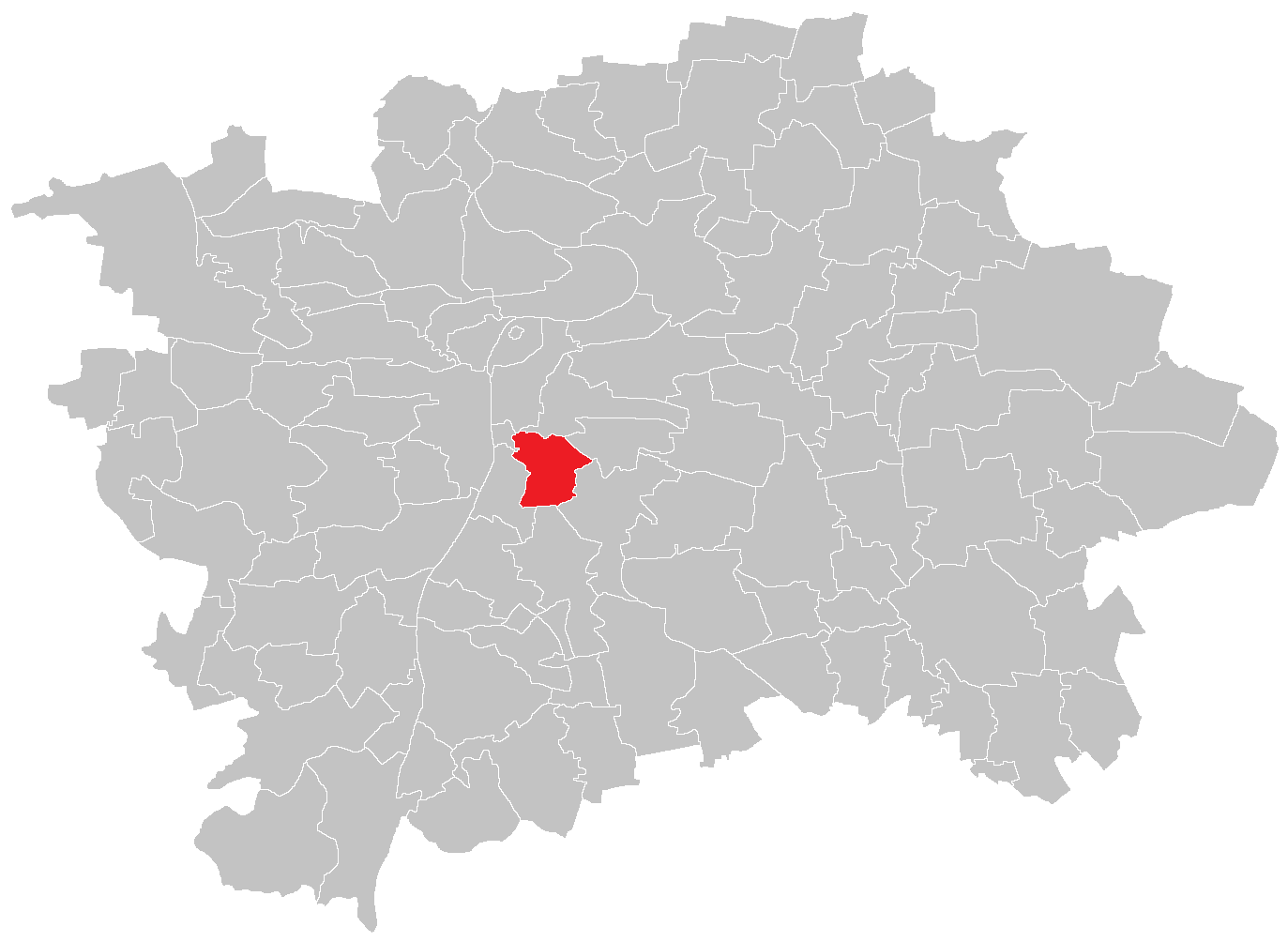
- Location of Nusle in Prague
- Coordinates: 50°3′36″N 14°26′24″E
- Country: Czech Republic
- Region: Prague
- District: Prague 2, Prague 4

Area
  - Total: 2.85 km^{2} (1.10 sq mi)

Population (2021)
  - Total: 35,150
  - Density: 12,300/km^{2} (31,900/sq mi)
- Time zone: UTC+1 (CET)
  - Summer (DST): UTC+2 (CEST)
- Postal code: 120 00, 140 00

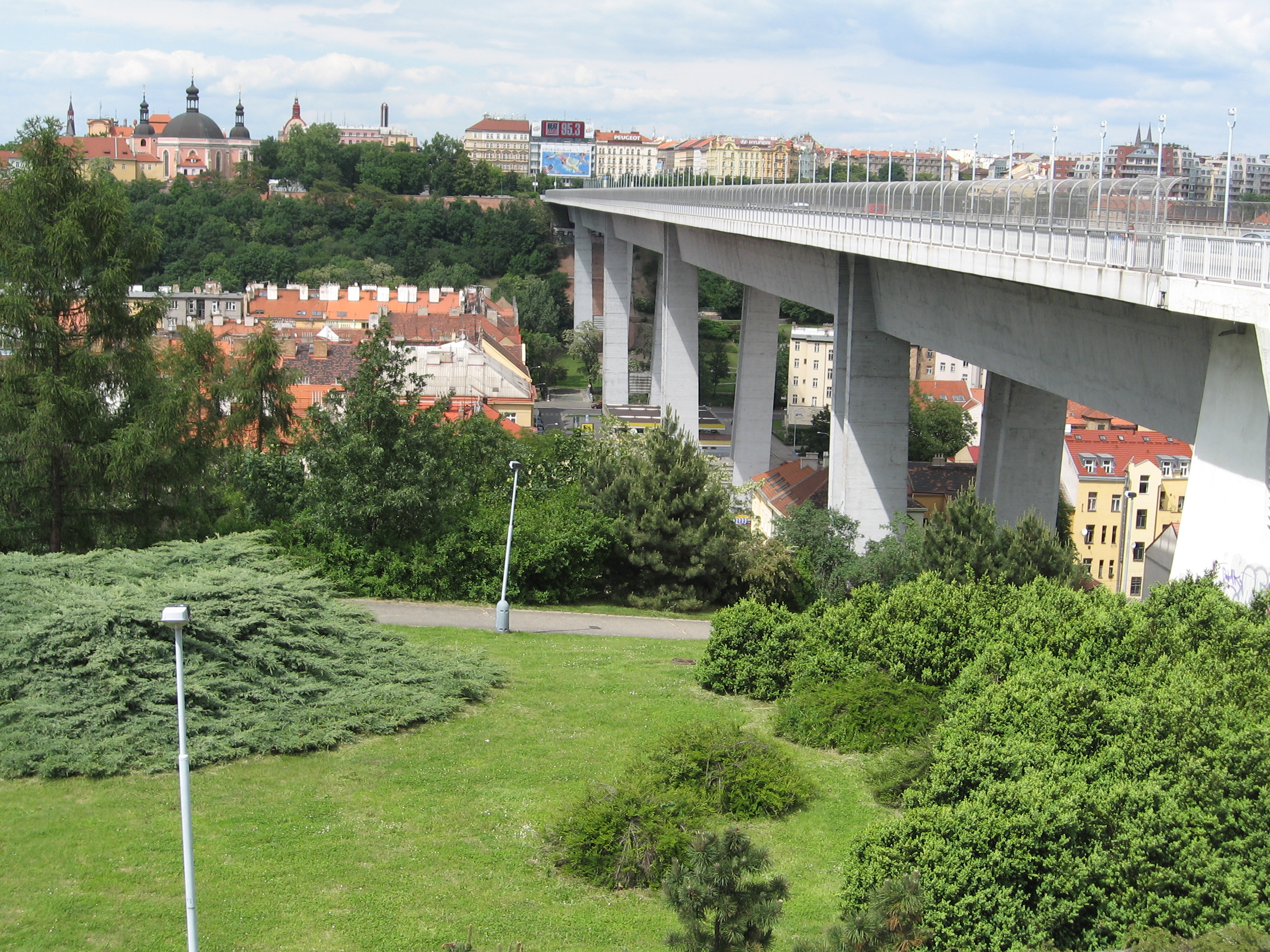
Nuselský most as seen from Prague Congress Center.

Nusle (Czech pronunciation: [ˈnuslɛ]) is a district of Prague. It became part of the city in 1922.

== Location ==
Part of Nusle is in Prague 2 while most is in Prague 4. Nusle is located south of the city centre in Nuselské údolí (Nusle Valley) on the Botič brook. It borders Vyšehrad to the west, the New Town and Vinohrady to the north and Vršovice to the east. The southern part of Nusle, on a plain above the valley, is known as Pankrác for the St. Pankratz church.

== History ==
The first written evidence of Nusle, as a village, dates back to the 11th century. It is recorded as Neosvětly, Nostuly, Nusle, Neosvitly or Neovstlí in the Middle Ages and the bulk of its territory consisted of vineyards (Vallis Vinarium or Valis vinearum), wine houses, mills by the Botič stream, homesteads (Bučanka, Belka, Terebovka, Reitknechtka, Formanka), a coaching inn, a lodge, and the St. Pankratz church in the part of Nusle named Krušina, residential farm houses in Lower and Upper Nusle, a meat market, and from the 17th century a mansion and brewery. Prior to 1750 there was an estate outside the mansion buildings comprising 35 houses. It was not until 1797, when colonel nobleman James Wimmer bought Nusle that the rural character disappeared.

An athletics club (Sokol) was founded in Nusle in 1888. In 1898 Nusle became an independent town and district.

Across the Nusle railway station a first president T. G. Masaryk with his legions came back from his exile to the free Czechoslovak republic, into the Prague 21 December 1918.

It was connected to Prague in the era of president Masaryk in 1922. At present Nusle has over 1,700 addresses.

== Demographics ==
Historical population

Year	Pop.	±%
1869	2,387	—
1880	5,555	+132.7%
1890	11,740	+111.3%
1900	20,122	+71.4%
1910	30,874	+53.4%

Year	Pop.	±%
1921	34,160	+10.6%
1930	41,076	+20.2%
1950	61,134	+48.8%
1961	63,629	+4.1%
1970	56,514	−11.2%

Year	Pop.	±%
1980	48,078	−14.9%
1991	40,796	−15.1%
2001	35,339	−13.4%
2011	35,263	−0.2%
2021	35,150	−0.3%

Source: Censuses

== Points of interest ==
Points of interest in the town are the Nusle Town Hall from the year 1908, the Nusle brewery from 1694, and the parish church of St. Wenceslaus built in 1899. Czechoslovak president T.G. Masaryk visited the Nusle Town Hall three times during his time in office. The new Sokol Nusle Hall with the gymnasium was built near the Town Hall in 1925, and old Sokol Nusle Hall from 1888 has rebuilt on the Czechoslovak Church in this year (from 1971 "hussites"). Also in Nusle is the Nusle Bridge, one of the largest in the Czech Republic, connecting the opposite sides of the valley. It is known for having many people commit suicide by jumping from it since 1973.
