= Vinohrady =

- Cadastral Area of Prague
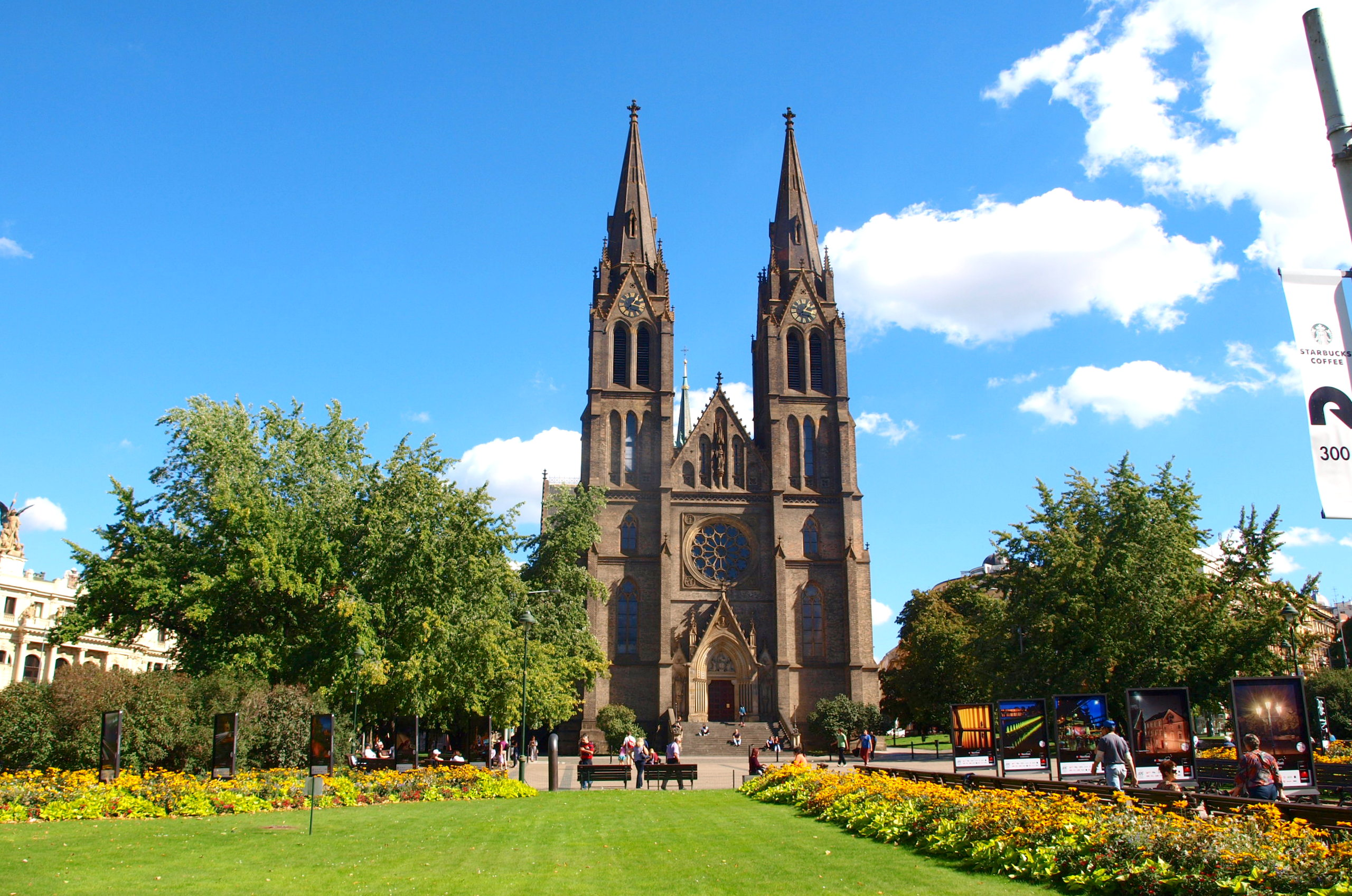
- Náměstí Míru (Peace Square) with Vinohrady Theatre and Church of St. Ludmila

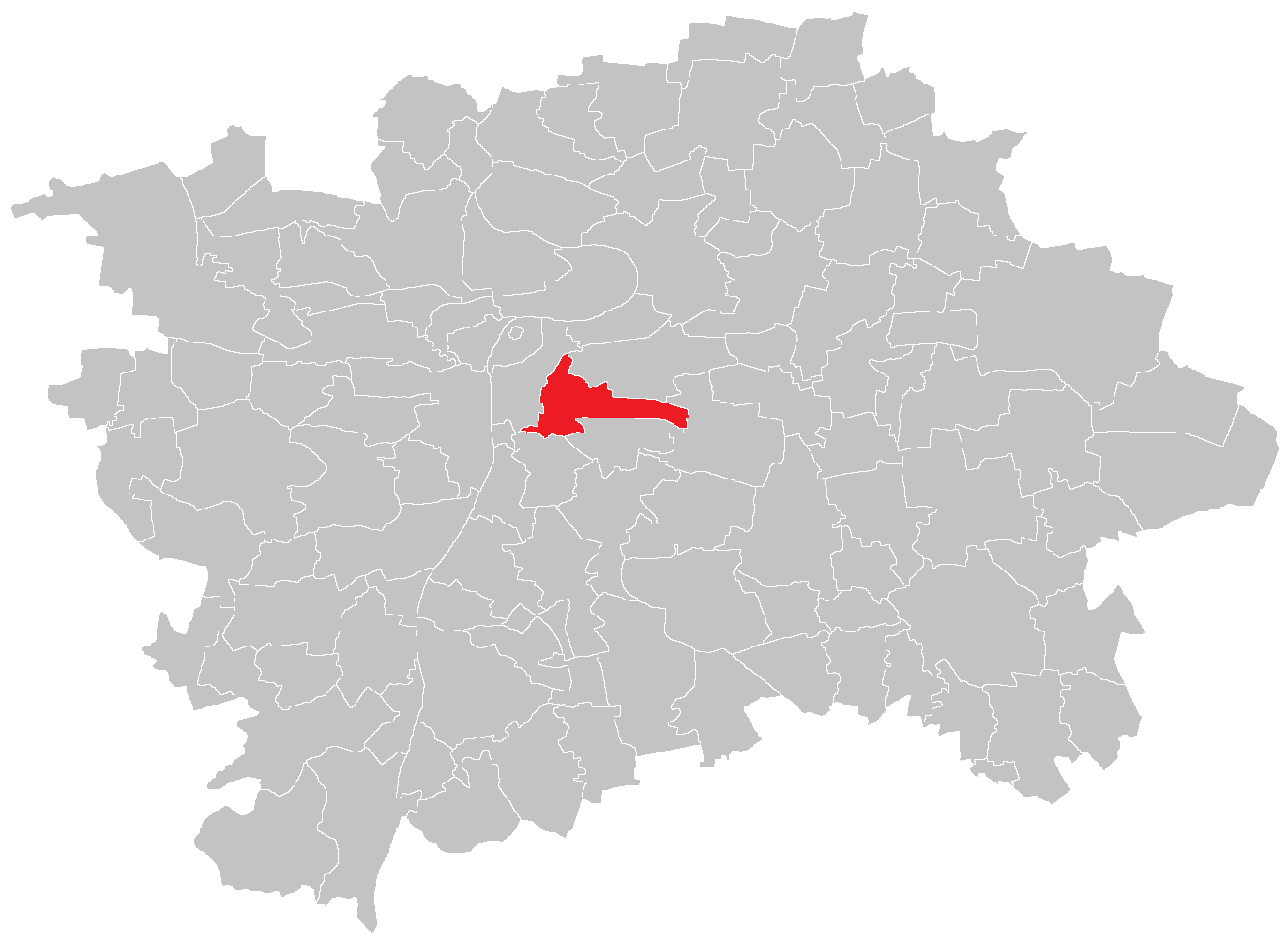
- Location of Vinohrady in Prague
- Coordinates: 50°04′32″N 14°26′45″E
- Country: Czech Republic
- Region: Prague
- District: Prague 1, Prague 2, Prague 3, Prague 4, Prague 10

Area
  - Total: 3.79 km^{2} (1.46 sq mi)

Population (2021)
  - Total: 48,805
  - Density: 12,900/km^{2} (33,400/sq mi)
- Time zone: UTC+1 (CET)
  - Summer (DST): UTC+2 (CEST)

Vinohrady (until 1960 Královské Vinohrady, in English literally "Royal Vineyards" German: Königliche Weinberge) is a cadastral district in Prague. It is so named because the area was once covered in vineyards dating from the 14th century. Vinohrady lies in the municipal and administrative districts of Prague 2 (west part), Prague 3 (north-east part) and Prague 10 (south-east part), little parts also of Prague 1 (Prague State Opera and Federal Assembly of Czechoslovakia) and Prague 4 (near Nusle).

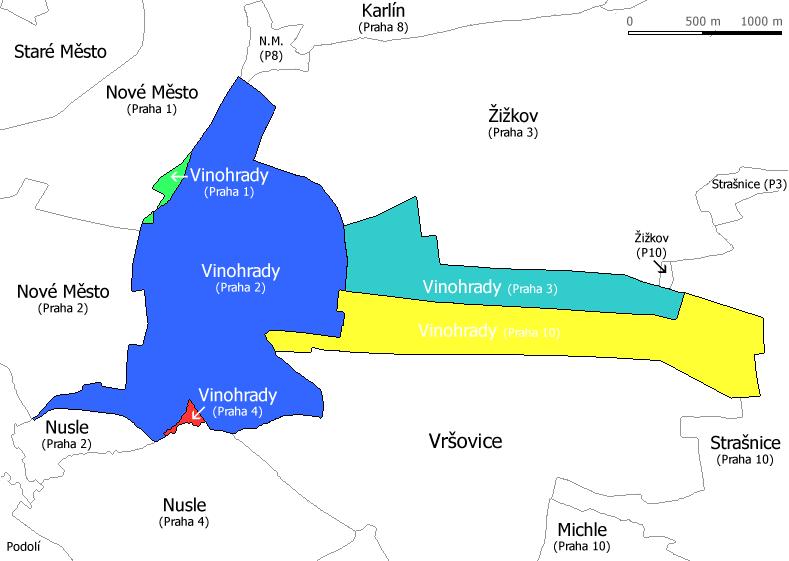
Administrative division of Vinohrady

Between 1788–1867 it was called Viničné Hory (Vineyard Mountains). From 1867 to 1968 it was called Královské Vinohrady ("Royal Vineyards"). In 1875, Královské Vinohrady was divided into two parts, Královské Vinohrady I and Královské Vinohrady II, the part I was renamed to Žižkov and the part II to Královské Vinohrady in 1877. In 1922 Královské Vinohrady was made part of Prague as district XII. In 1949, the west part was conjoined with Prague 2 and the east part remain separate district Prague 12. In 1960, when Prague's divisions were reduced from 16 to 10 administrative districts, the north part of Prague 12 was conjoined with Žižkov into Prague 3 and the south part was joined to Prague 10. Local patriots say that the real reason was that Královské Vinohrady was known as a "bourgeois" district and thus politically unreliable for the then-ruling Communist Party of Czechoslovakia.

The historic part of Prague Main Railway Station (open 1871 as Franz Joseph I Station) is situated at the margin of Vinohrady. City Electric Tramway of Královské Vinohrady (1897) were a base of the Prague net of municipal electric tramway.

== Description ==
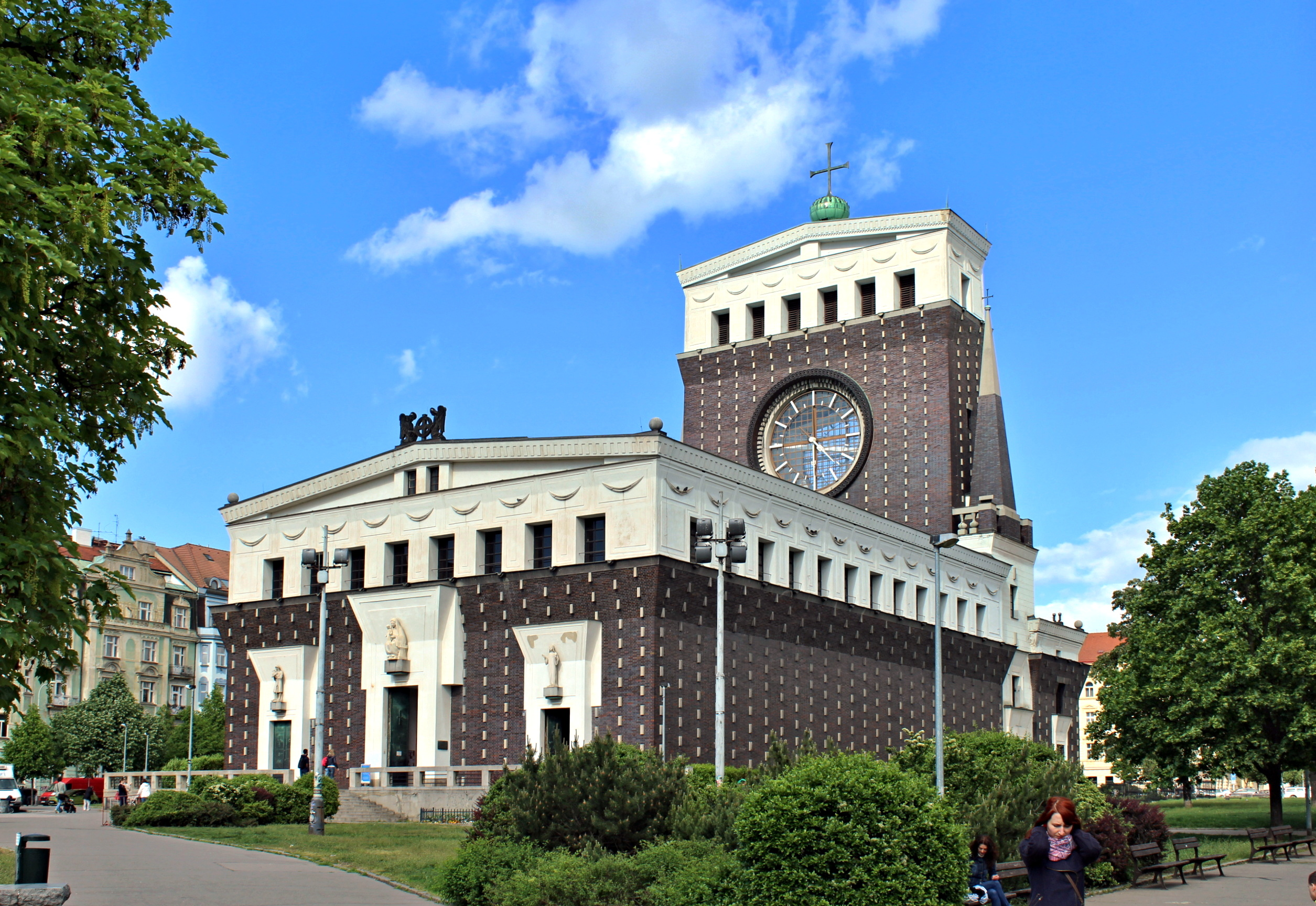
Church of the Most Sacred Heart of Our Lord at Jiřího z Poděbrad Square

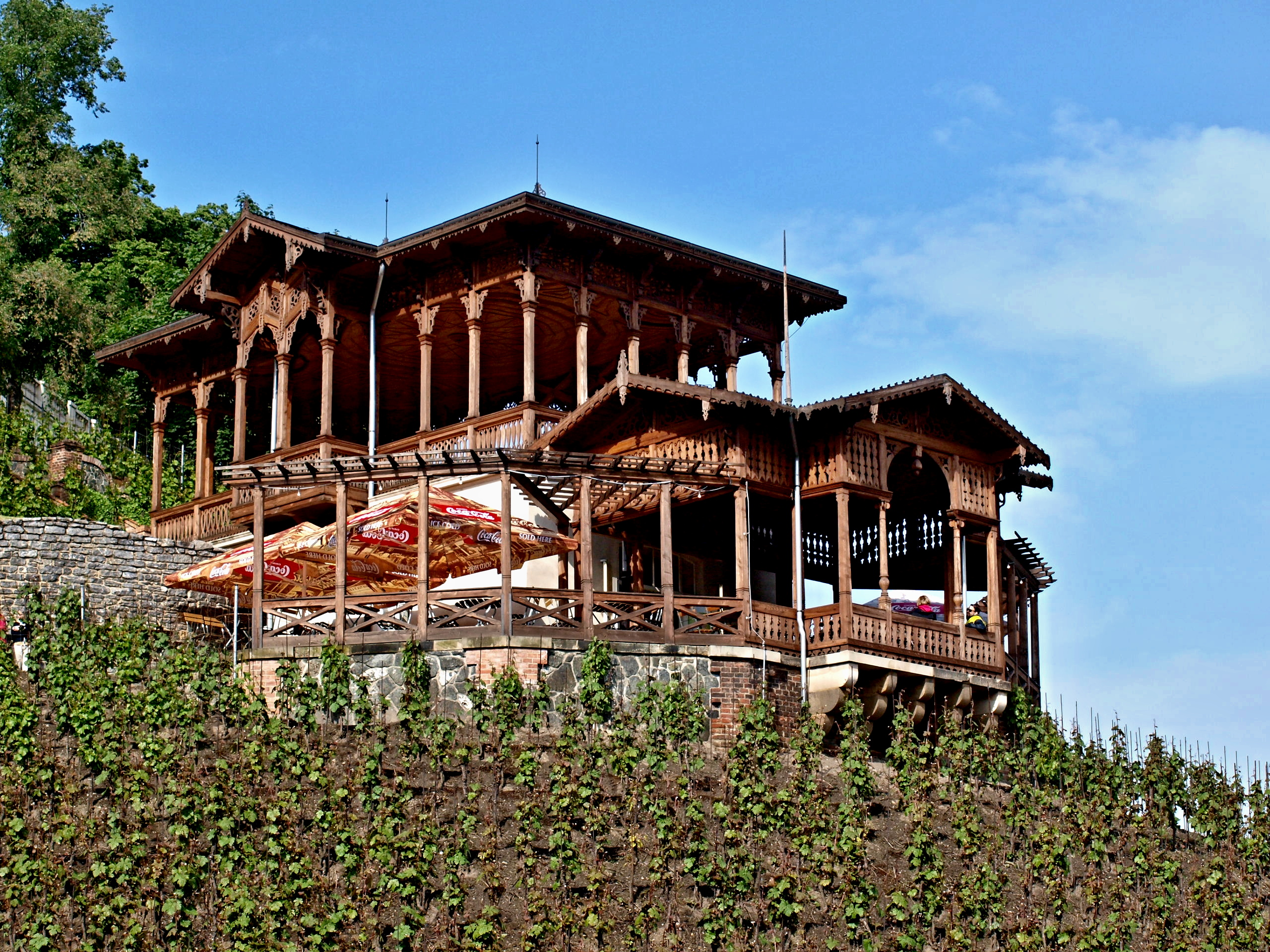
Vineyard summerhouse in Havlíčkovy sady

The main east-west avenue of Vinohrady is Vinohradská Avenue leading from Wenceslas Square to Žižkov and Strašnice. Along this street stand headquarter building of Czech Radio, old Vinohrady Market Hall and Vinohrady Water Tower and several stations of Prague Metro Line A (Náměstí Míru, Jiřího z Poděbrad, Flora, Želivského). Parallel to Vinohradská street, there is Slezská street, Korunní street (from Peace Square to Flora) and Francouzská street (from Peace Square to Vršovice]. In the east part of Vinohrady near Strašnice are situated the large Královské Vinohrady Teaching Hospital and Vinohrady Cemeteries.

In the south-north direction, Legerova street as a part of North-South Artery leads at the west margin of Vinohrady, which is a boundary of New Town, along C metro line from Nusle Bridge to the main railway station (Praha hlavní nádraží). Next south-north streets (Bělehradská with Tyl's Square, Italská and many others) are narrower and surmount broken relief crosswise valleys.

The main square of west Vinohrady is "náměstí Míru" (Peace Square) with Prague 2 town hall, Vinohrady Theatre, Gothic Revival Saint Ludmila Church (Josef Mocker, 1892) and a station of A metro line. In the central part of Vinohrady near Vinohradská street, there lies "náměstí Jiřího z Poděbrad" (George of Poděbrady Square) with a modern "Church of the Most Sacred Heart of Our Lord" by Jože Plečnik built in 1932. In Vinohrady is also situated center of the Czech gay scene, including a number of gay-friendly bars.

Famous Czech artists such as Jakub Schikaneder, Otto Gutfreund, Hugo Boettinger and Karel Špillar are buried in Vinohrady Cemetery.

=== Parks ===
There are several parks in Vinohrady. Havlíčkovy sady (Havlíček's Orchards) is Prague's second-largest park. Villa Gröbe served as summerhouse of the nobility, it is inspired by Italian Renaissance suburban villas and is surrounded by vineyards still in production, founded by Charles IV in the second half of the 14th century. The vineyards and the house deteriorated towards the end of the 20th century, but were renewed. The vineyards now have an area of 1.7 ha and annually produce 4000 liters of wine. There are grown varieties of Müller Thurgau, Rhine Riesling, Dornfelder, Pinot Gris and Pinot Noir, and since 1997 there are annual "Vinohrady vintage celebrations", usually in September.

In the north-west part of Vinohrady, near Italská street, are the Riegrovy sady (Rieger's Orchards) with a great view over Prague, Vinohrady Sokol House and a large beer garden. Folimanka Park is situated at the Vinohrady side of Nusle Valley under the large Nusle Bridge. Smaller parks are situated in central Vinohrady: sady Svatopluka Čecha (Svatopluk Čech's Orchards) near Vinohradská street, Bezručovy sady (Petr Bezruč's Orchards) between Slezská and Francouzská street and parks at all main Vinohrady squares.

== Demographics ==
Historical population

Year	Pop.	±%
1869	1,274	—
1880	14,831	+1064.1%
1890	34,531	+132.8%
1900	52,504	+52.0%
1910	77,120	+46.9%

Year	Pop.	±%
1921	83,367	+8.1%
1930	95,497	+14.6%
1950	94,927	−0.6%
1961	103,082	+8.6%
1970	92,105	−10.6%

Year	Pop.	±%
1980	77,810	−15.5%
1991	65,752	−15.5%
2001	54,516	−17.1%
2011	50,348	−7.6%
2021	48,805	−3.1%

Source: Censuses

== Gallery ==
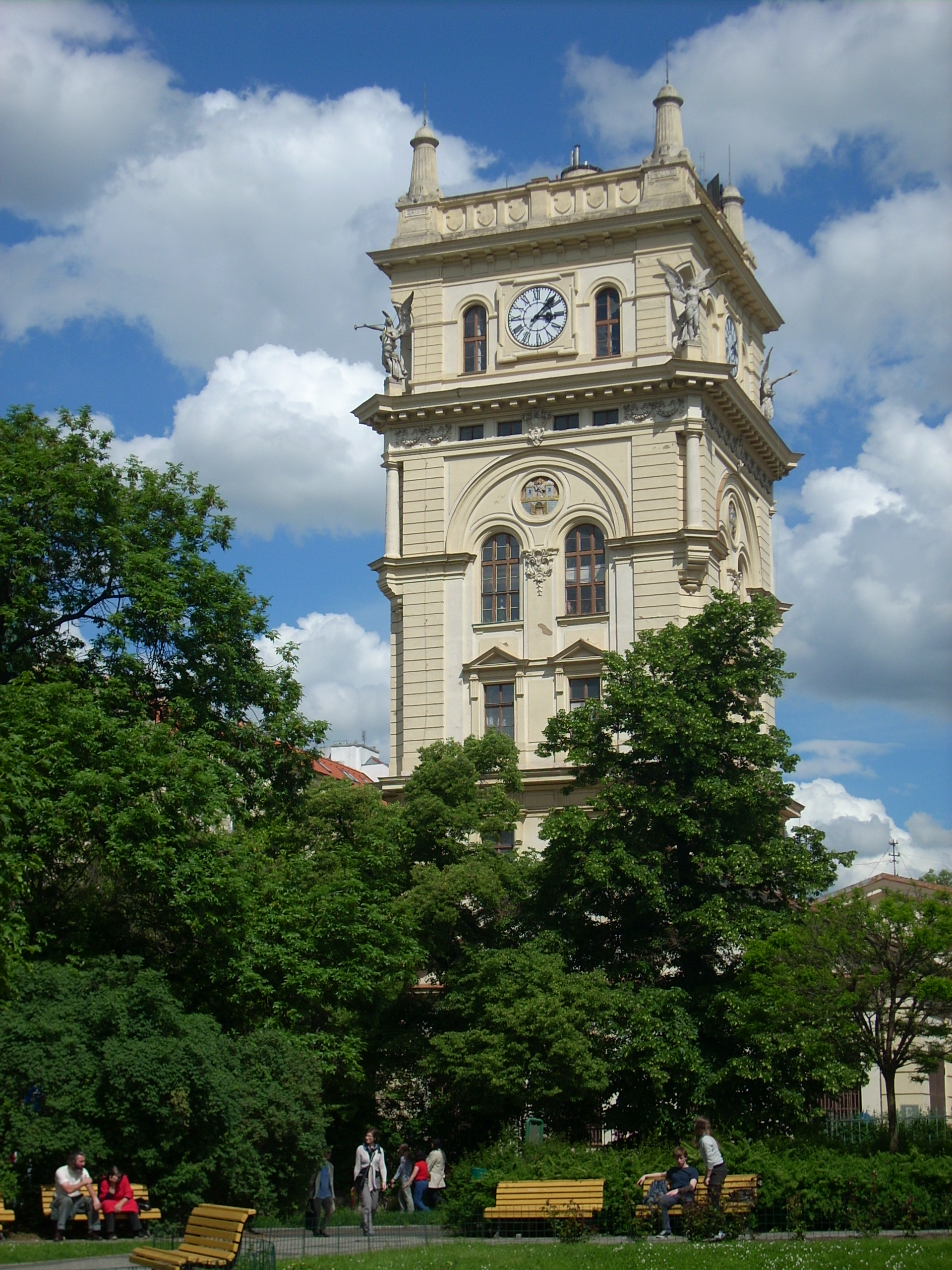
Vinohrady Water Tower

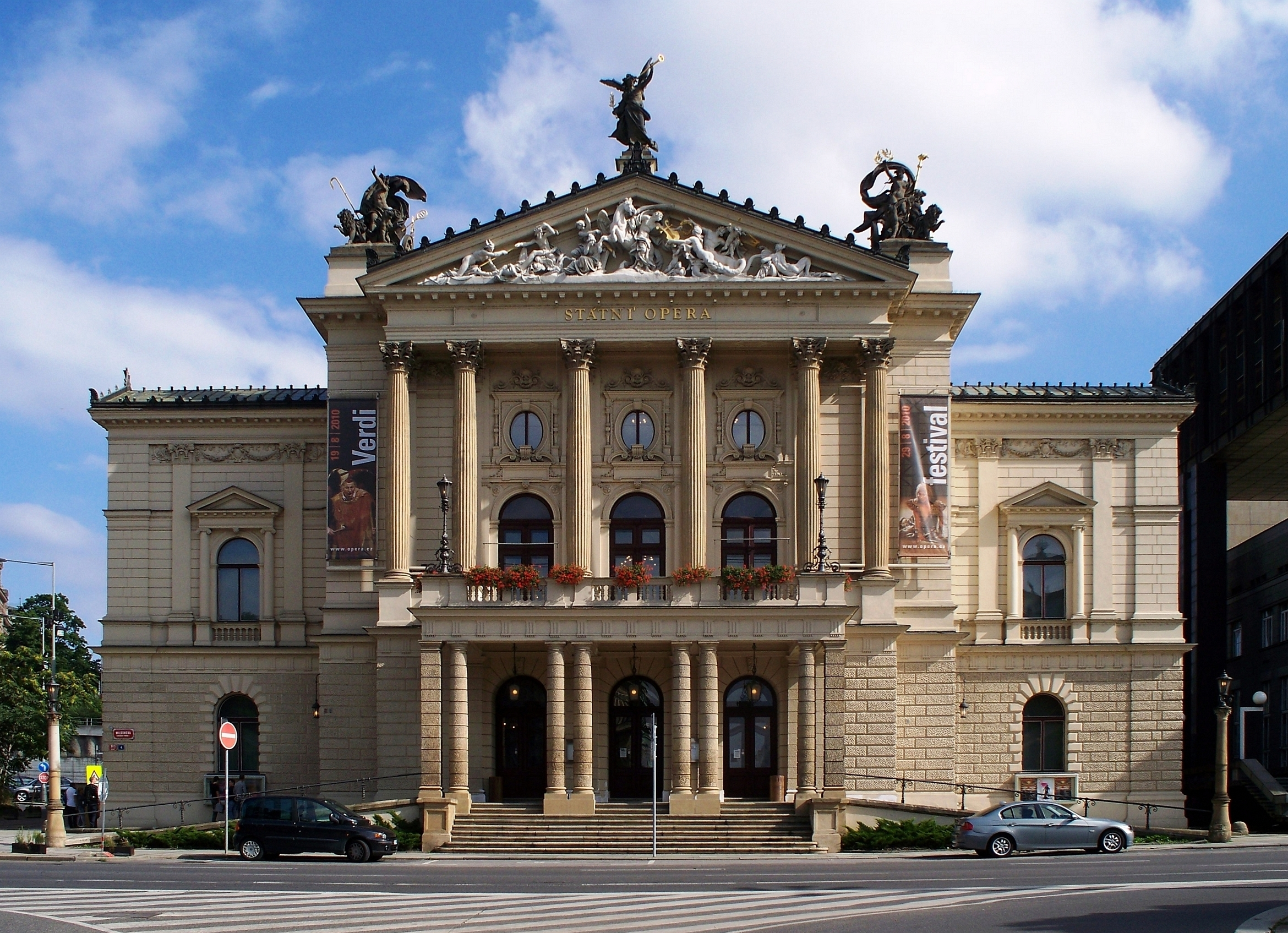
Prague State Opera

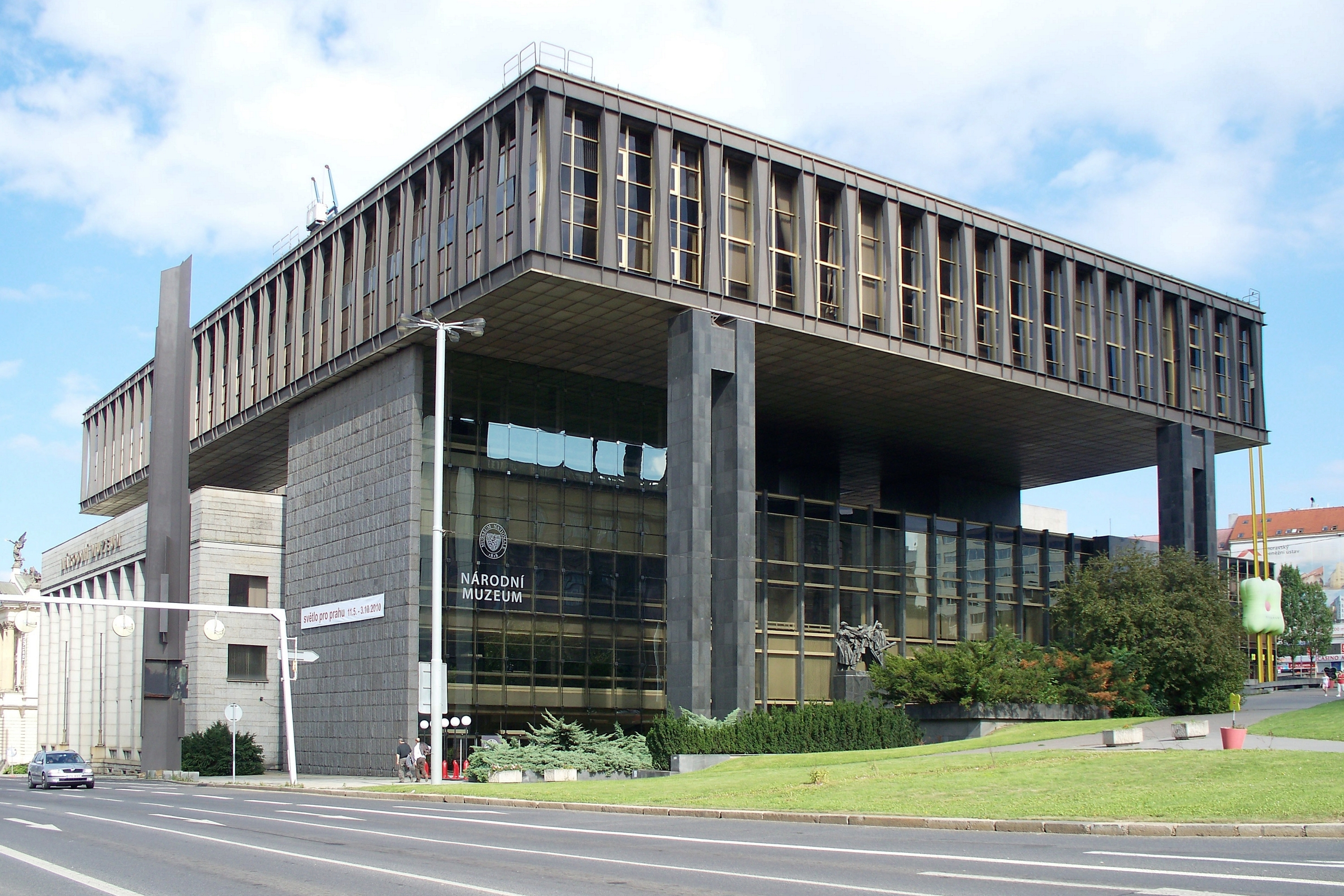
Former Federal Assembly of Czechoslovakia

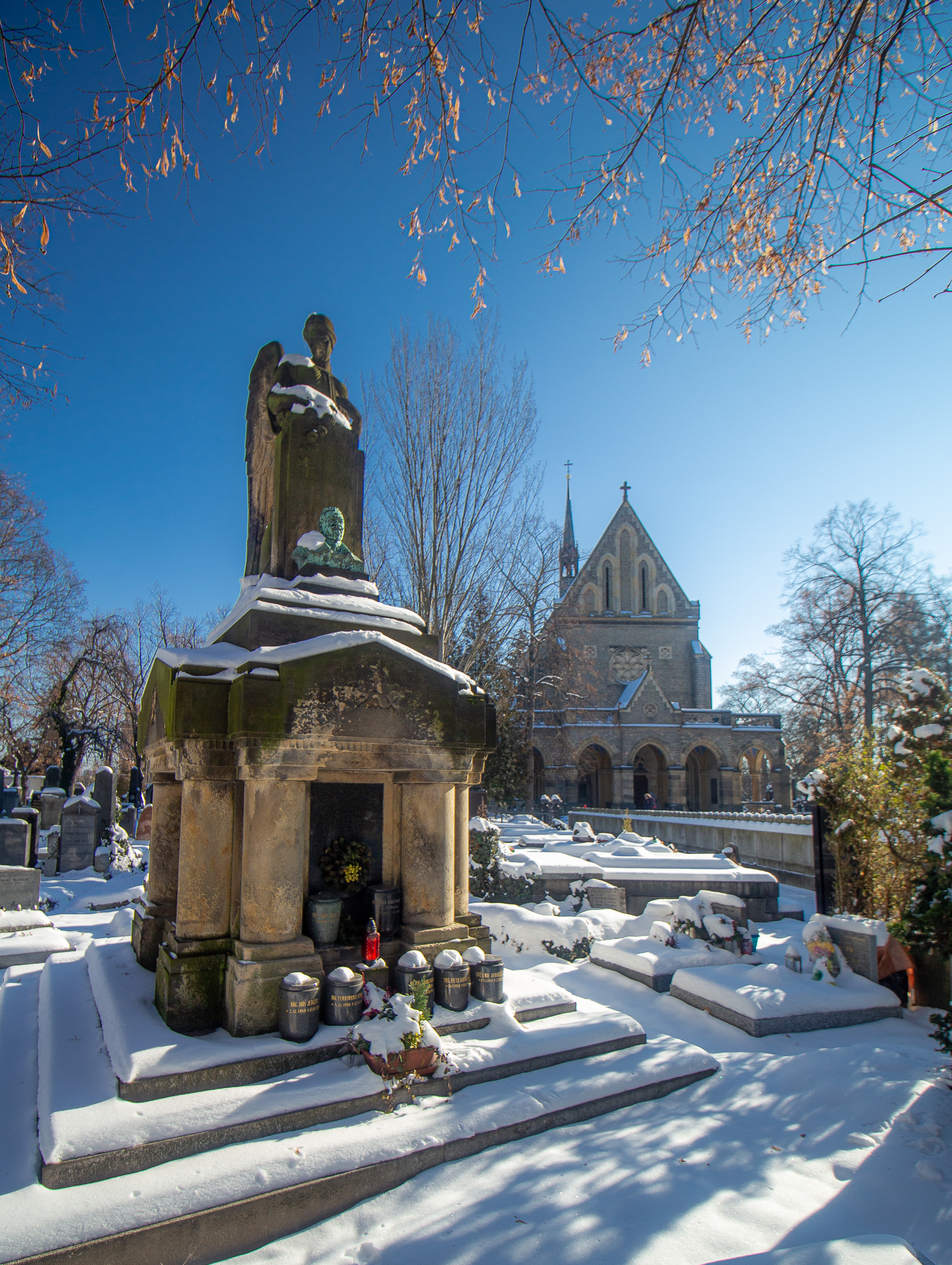
Vinohrady Cemetery with Saint Wenceslaus Church

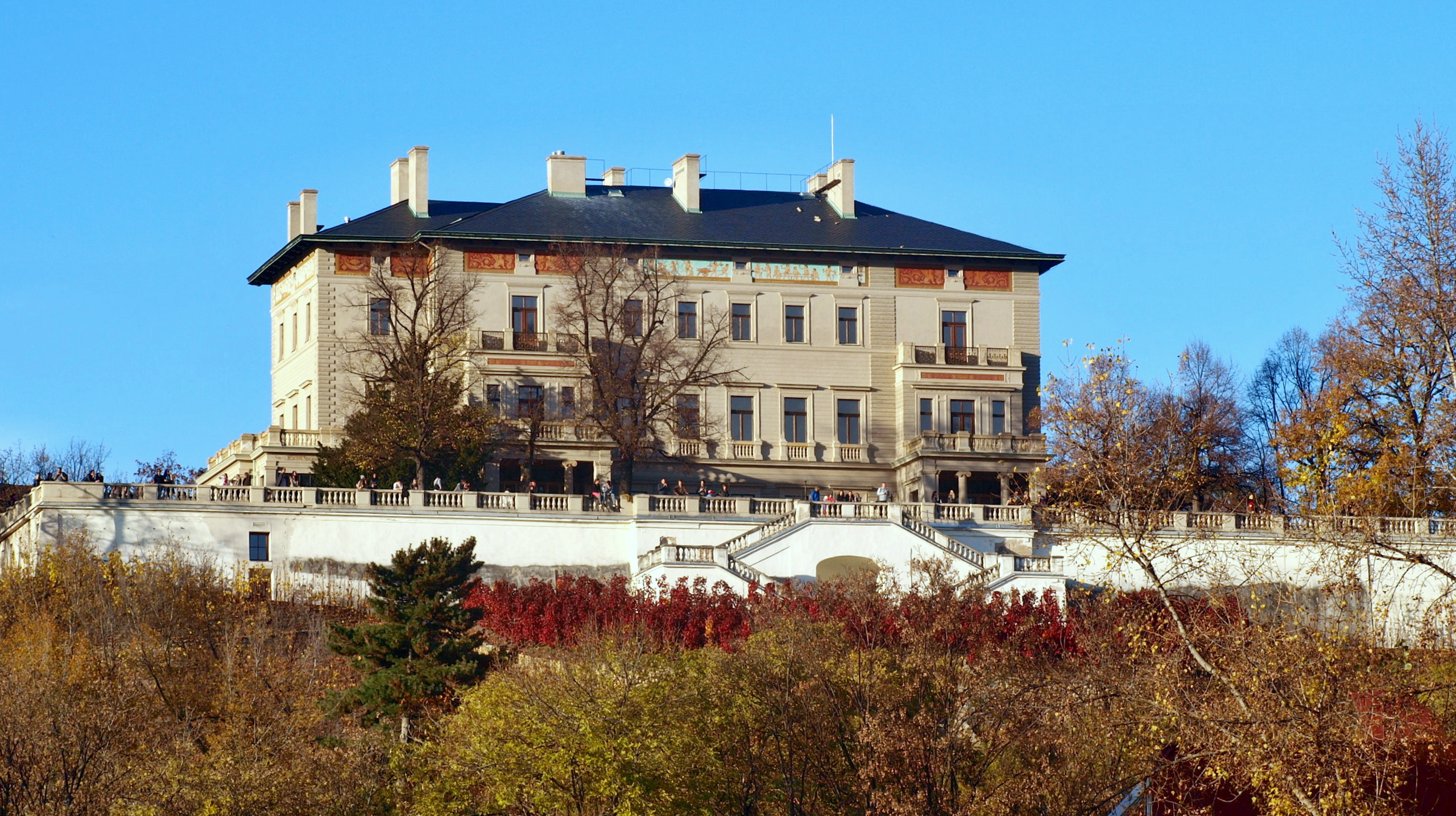
Villa Gröbe, Havlíčkovy sady

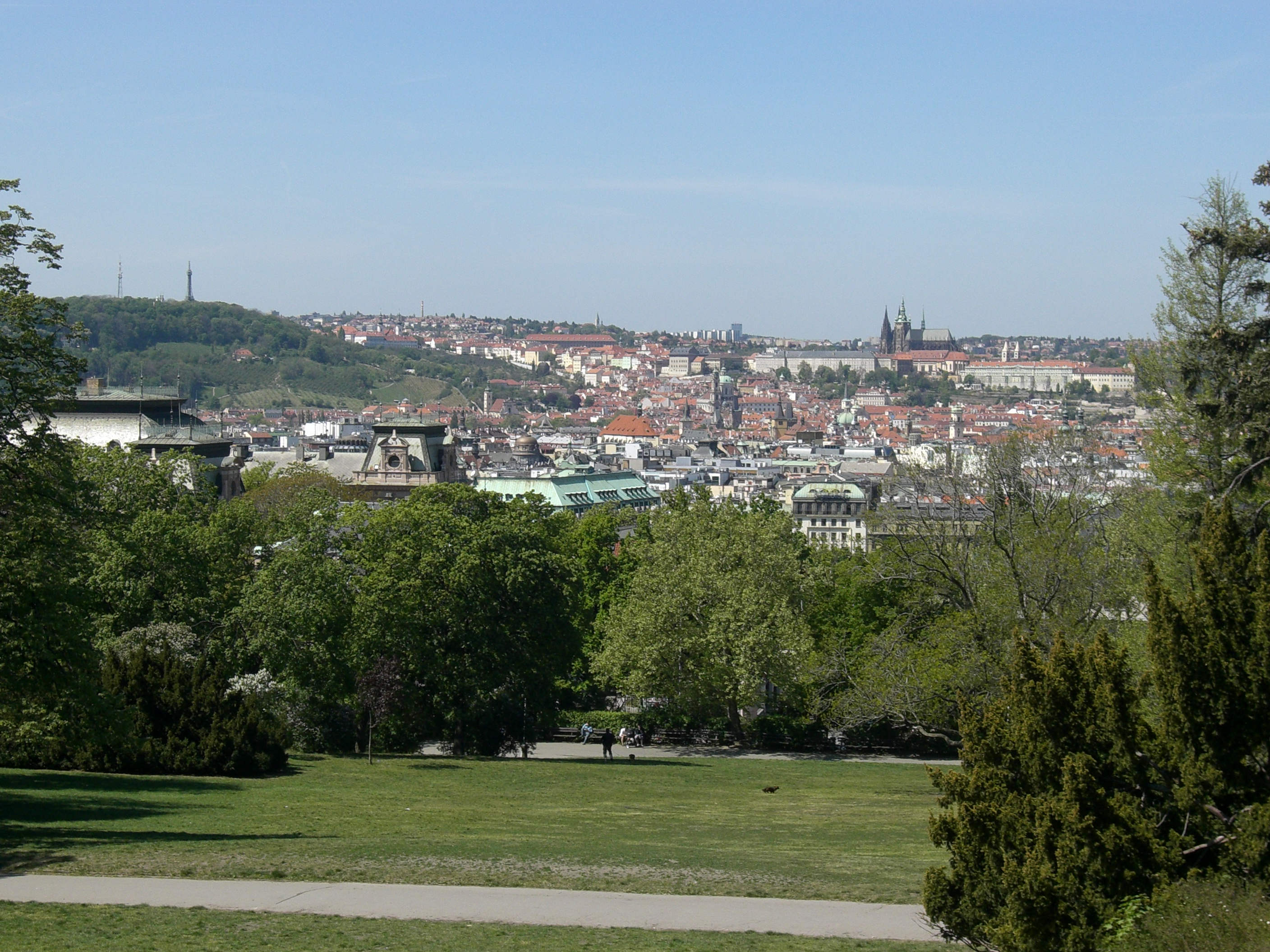
Great view over Prague from Riegrovy sady

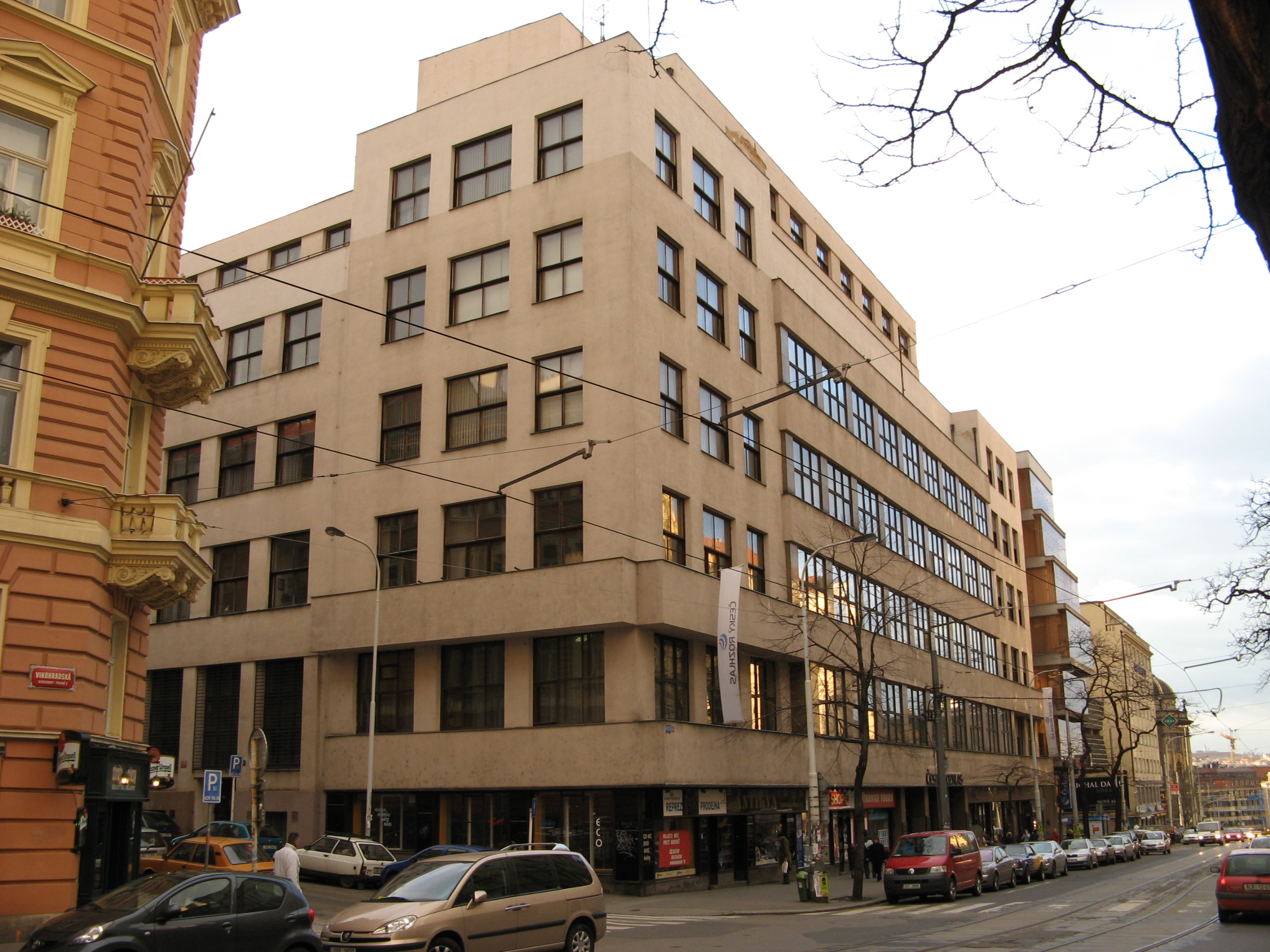
Czech Radio headquarters in Vinohradská street

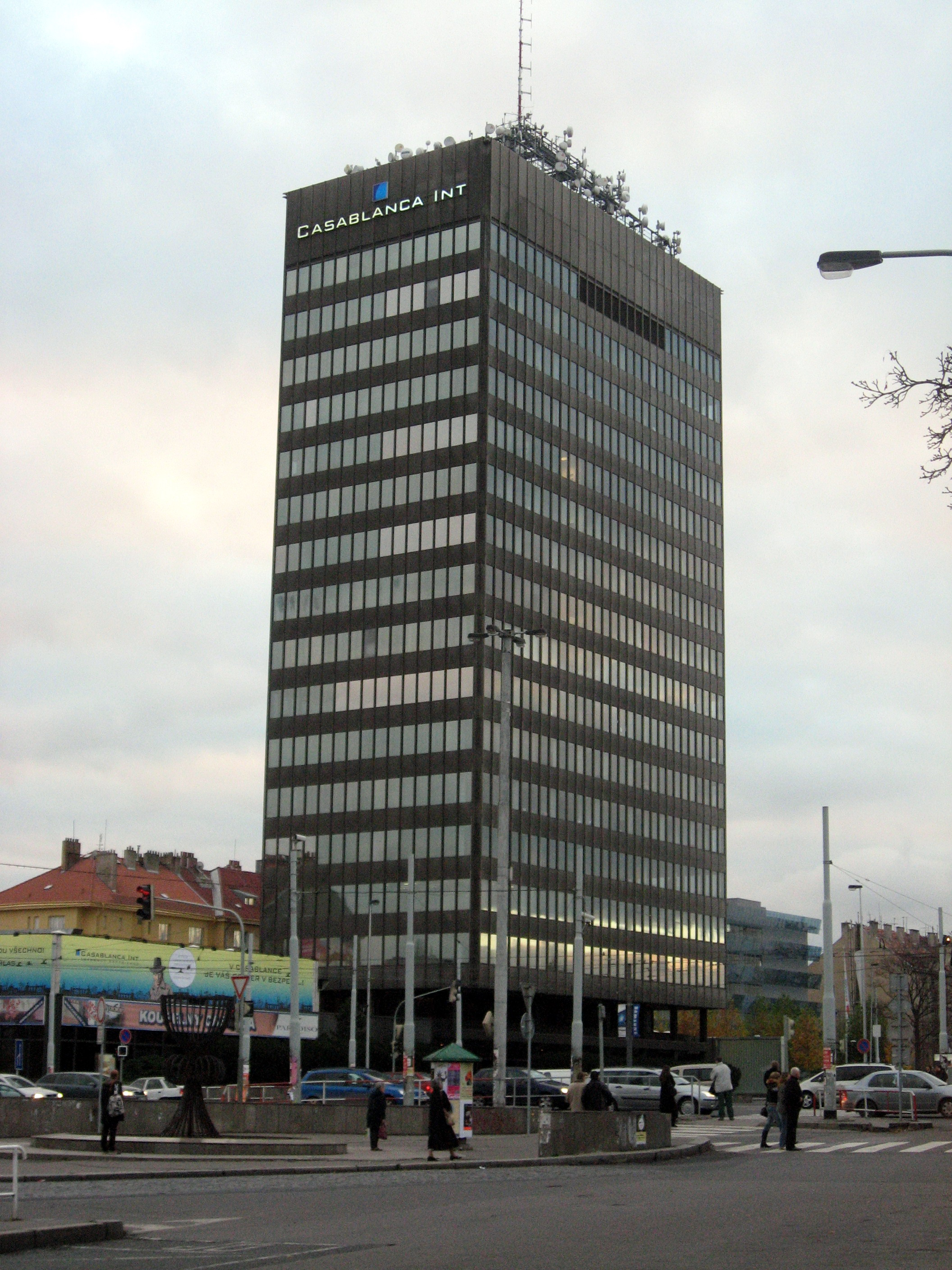
Strojimport building near Vinohradská street and Želivského metro station

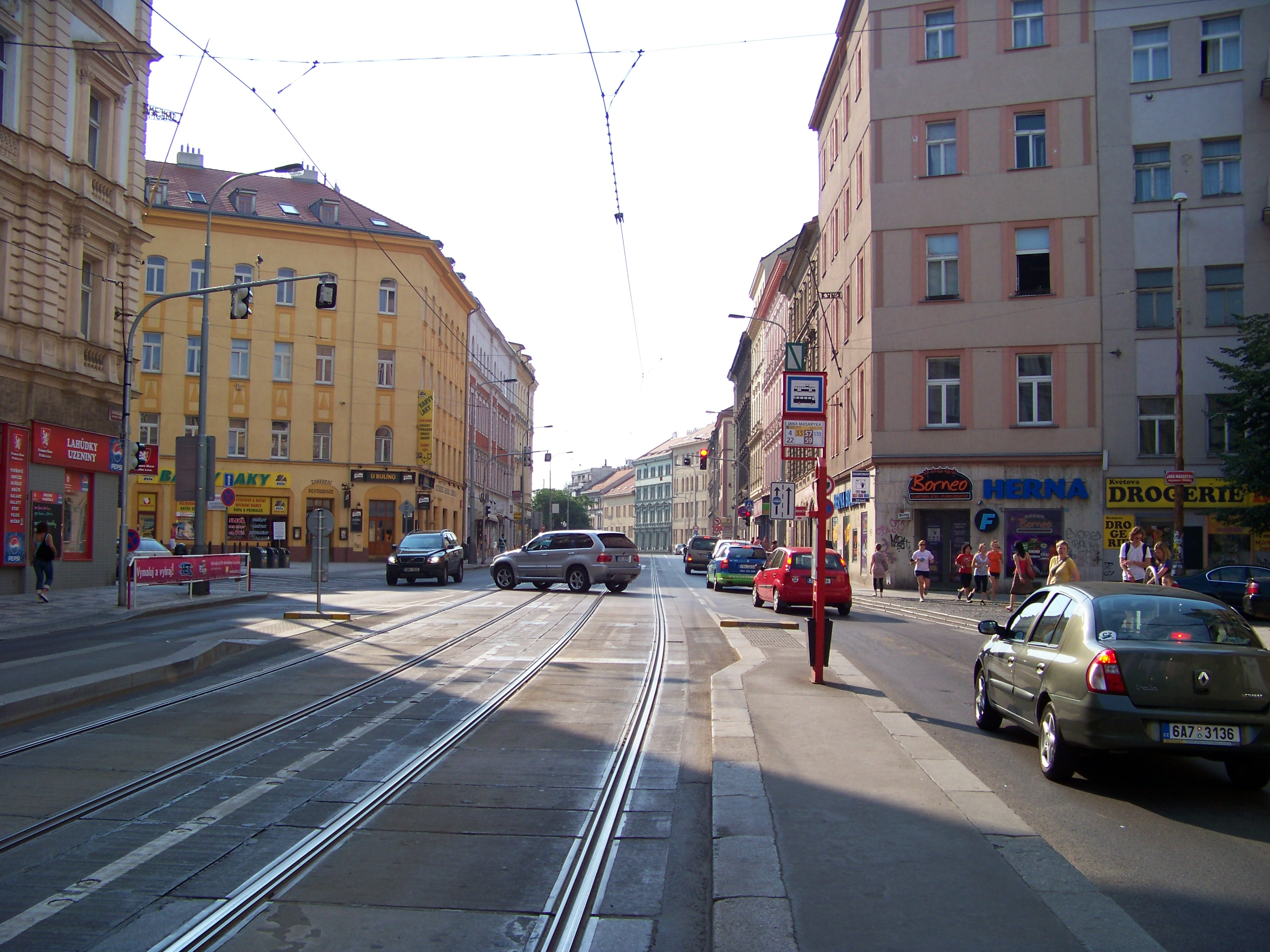
Francouzská street

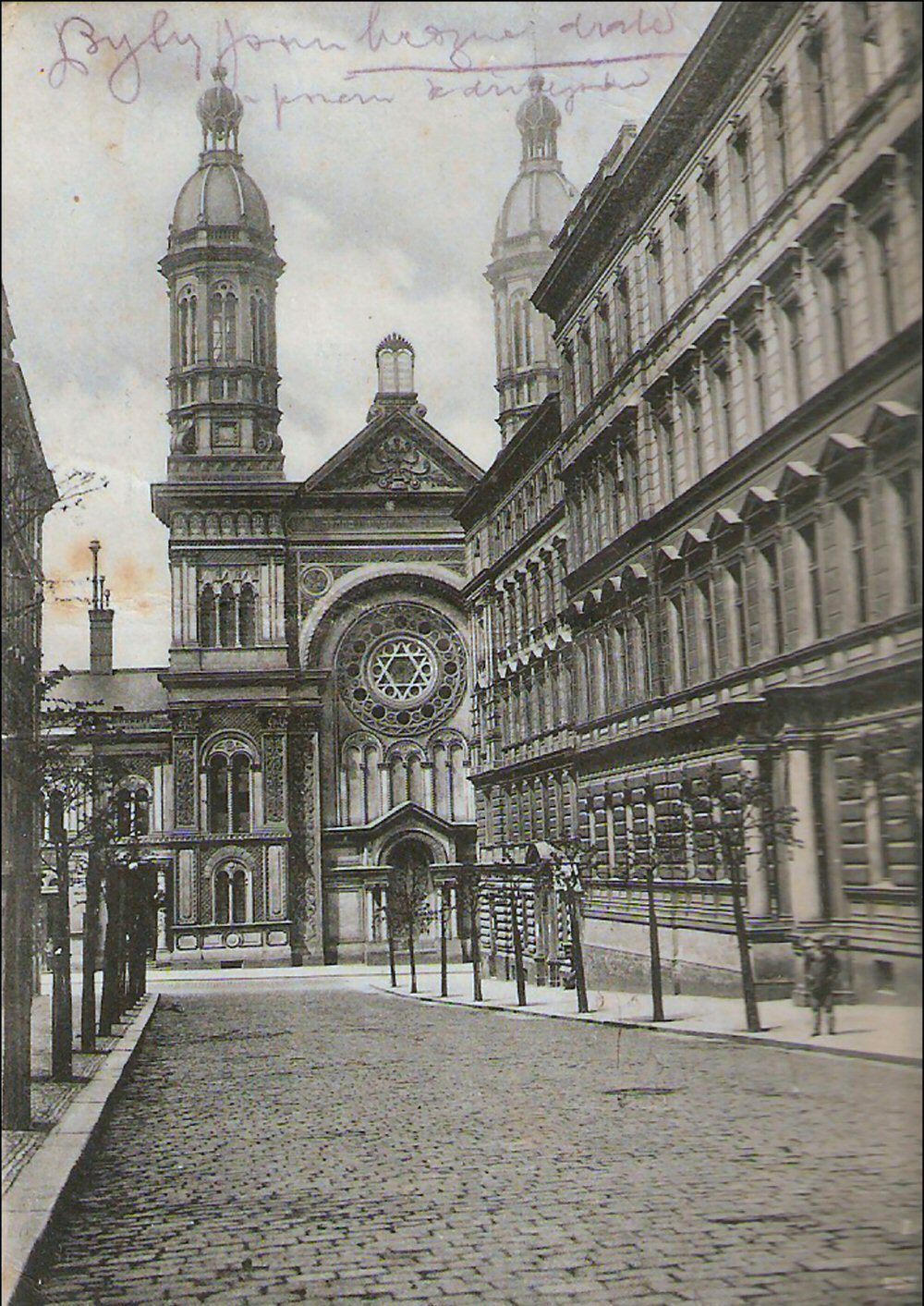
Vinohrady Synagogue (destroyed 1951 through 1945 war damage, Elementary School in Sázavská street was built on the site)

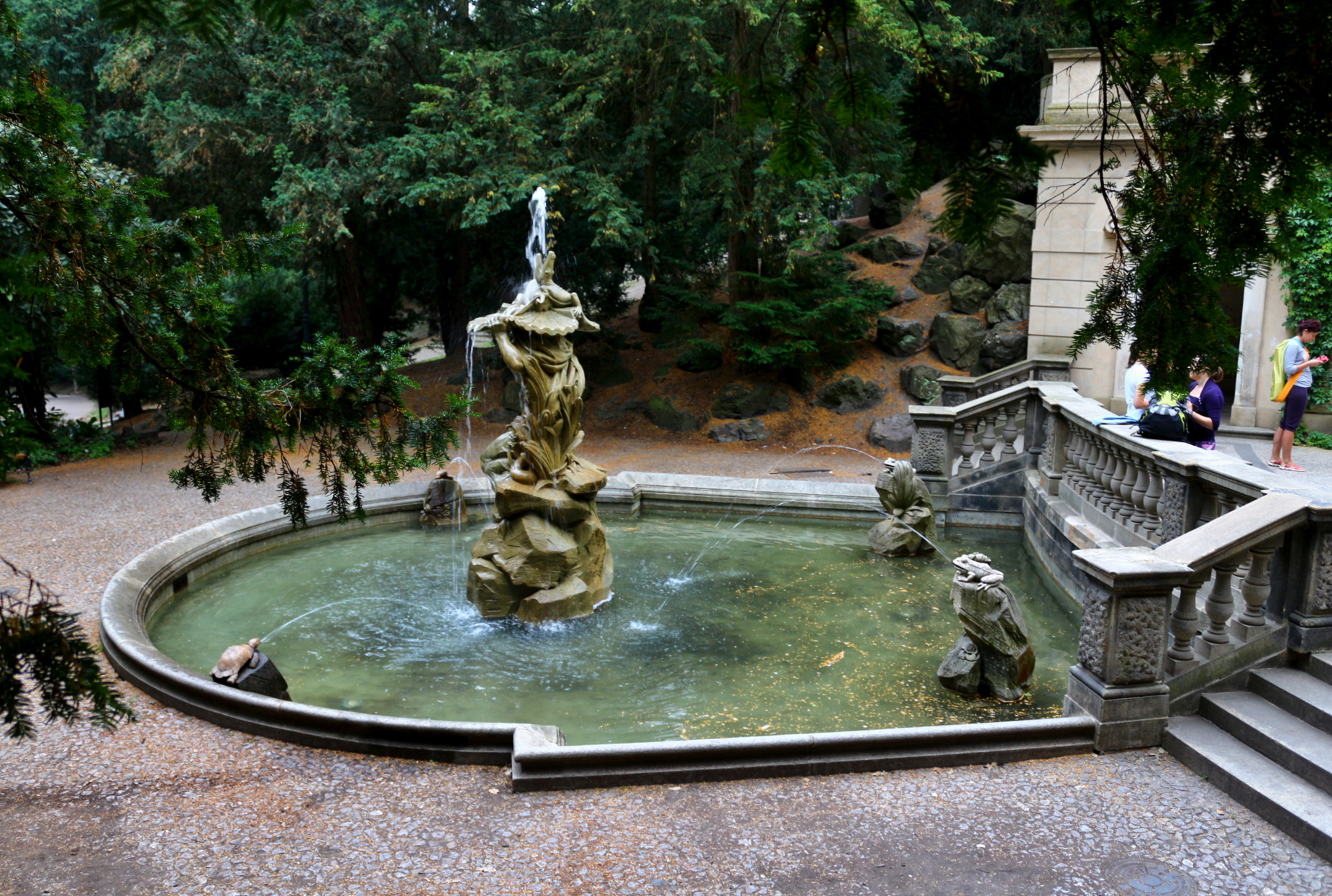
Fountain and artificial cave Grotta in Havlíčkovy sady
