= Josef Chochol =

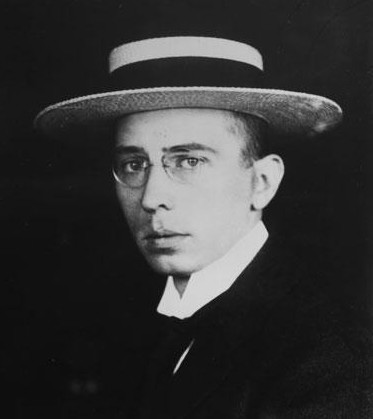
Chochol in 1910

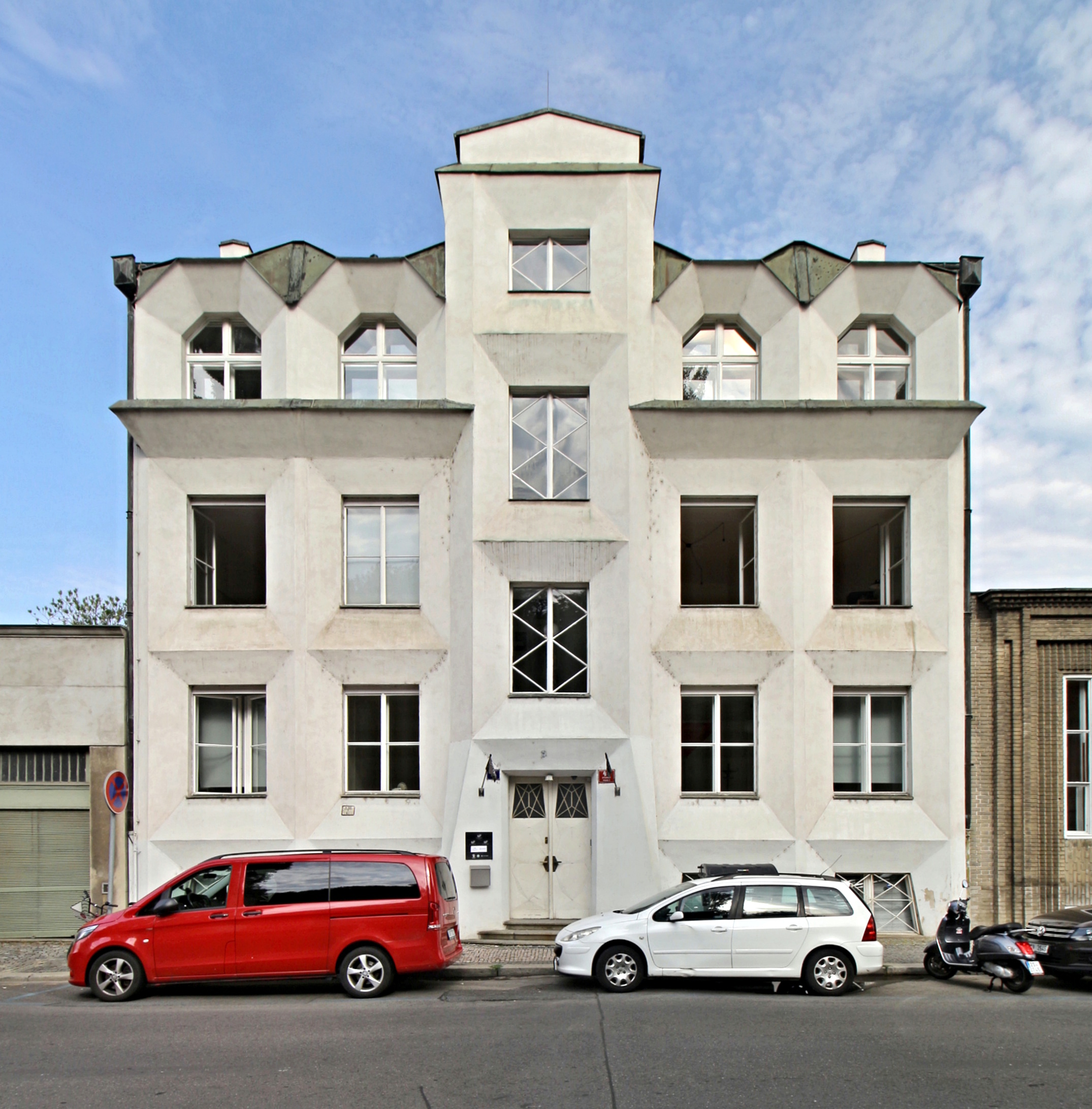
Cubist house Kovařovicova vila in Prague-Vyšehrad, Czech Republic

Josef Chochol (13 December 1880 – 6 July 1956) was a Czech architect. He was a key member of Mánes Union of Fine Arts and worked in a Cubist style.

== Life and education ==
Chochol was born on 13 December 1880 in Písek. He studied architecture at the Prague Polytechnic (1908–1924), then at the academy in Vienna, under the guidance of Otto Wagner (1907–1909). He died on 6 July 1956 in Prague.

== Career ==
He was one of three significant Cubist architects, together with Pavel Janák and Josef Gočár; all three were members of the Mánes Union of Fine Arts. Chochol was a member since 1913 until he was expelled in 1945 for "patriotic deficiency".

Three buildings he designed in Vyšehrad part of Prague are considered masterworks of Cubist architecture:

- Villa Kovařovic (Kovařovicova vila) at Libušina 49 near Rašínově nábřeží / square, named after the owner Bedřich Kovařovic, constructed 1912–1913.
- A cubist collective apartment block at Neklanova 98, based on a design by František Hodek, constructed 1914–1914 named 'Hodek Apartments' (1913).
- A villa, now called Kubistický Trojdům (the "Cubist Threehouse"), at Rašínovo nábřeží 47, constructed 1913–1914.

His other projects were:

- renovation of the Brožík-hall in the Old City Hall
- the original Troja-bridge (Trojský most) between Holešovice and Troja, designed with engineer František Mencl, constructed 1926-1928; renamed Barricades bridge (Most Barikádníků) in 1946 and service until 1975

Most of his other designs (cubist factory, theatre) were admired but never realized. In 1914, he abandoned the Cubist style and began working in the internationally oriented constructivist style.

Chochol was also active in politics: he was a founding member of the Left Front organisation and the Association of Socialist Architects, and was the only one of the Czech Cubists with strong political views.

== See also ==
- Czech Cubism
