= Czech Cubism =

Avant-garde art movement in Czech Republic

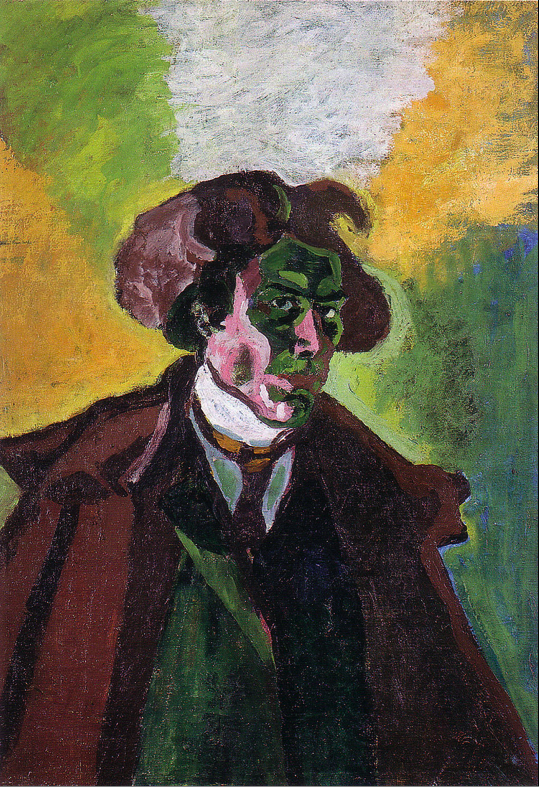
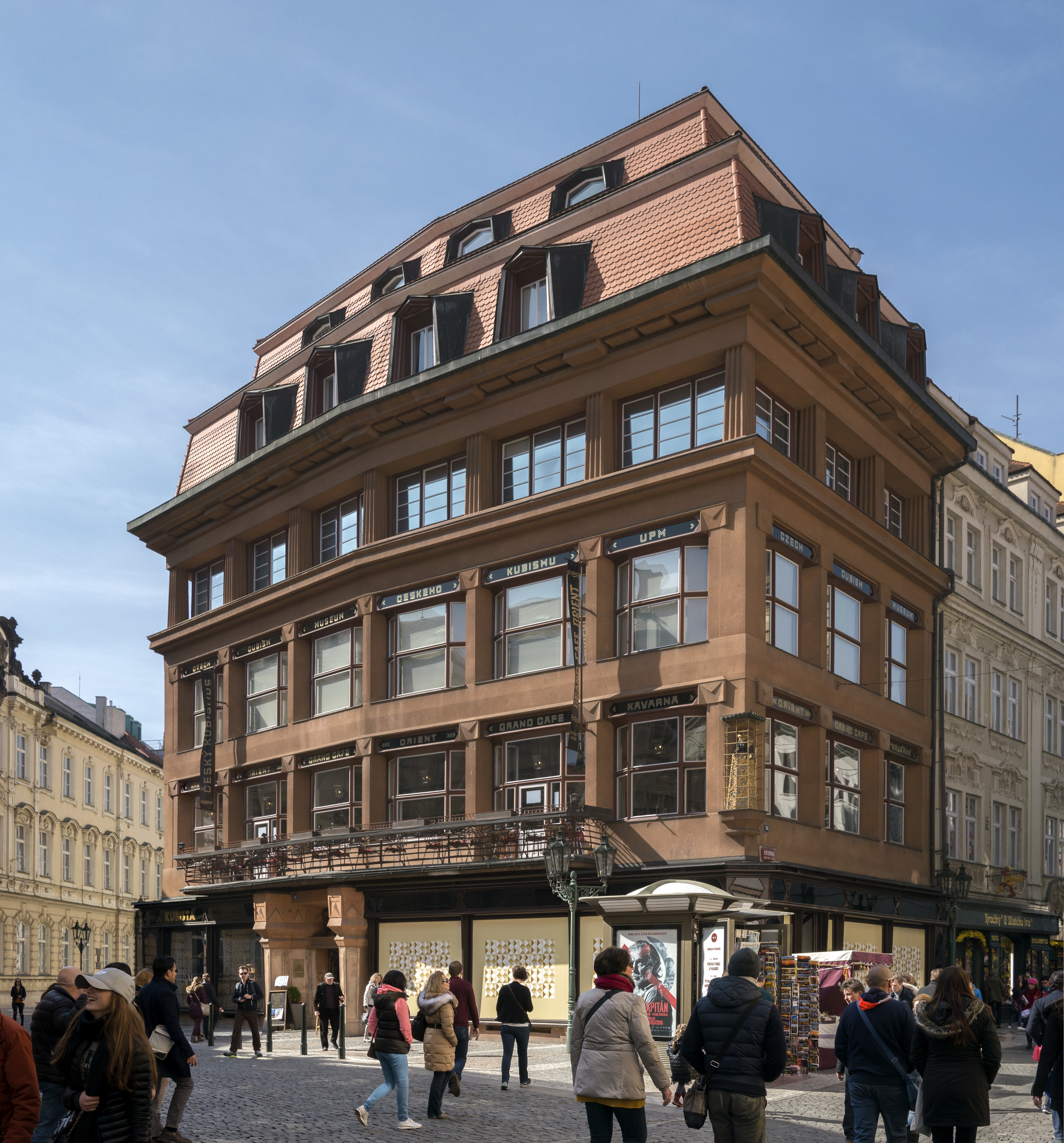
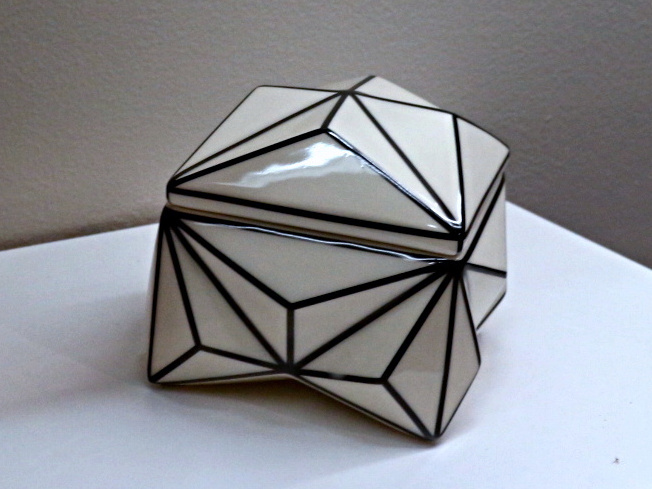
- Top to bottom: Bohumil Kubišta, 1908, Self portrait; House of the Black Madonna by Josef Gočár; porcelain by Pavel Janák
- Years active: c. 1912–1914
- Location: Kingdom of Bohemia, Austria-Hungary
- Influences: Cubism
- Influenced: Rondocubism

Czech Cubism (referred to more generally as Cubo-Expressionism) was an avant-garde art movement of Czech proponents of Cubism, active mostly in Prague from 1912 to 1914. Prague was perhaps the most important center for Cubism outside Paris before the start of World War I.

== Members ==
Members of this movement realized the epochal significance of the cubism of Pablo Picasso and Georges Braque and attempted to extract its components for their own work in all branches of artistic creativity: sculpture, painting, applied arts and architecture.

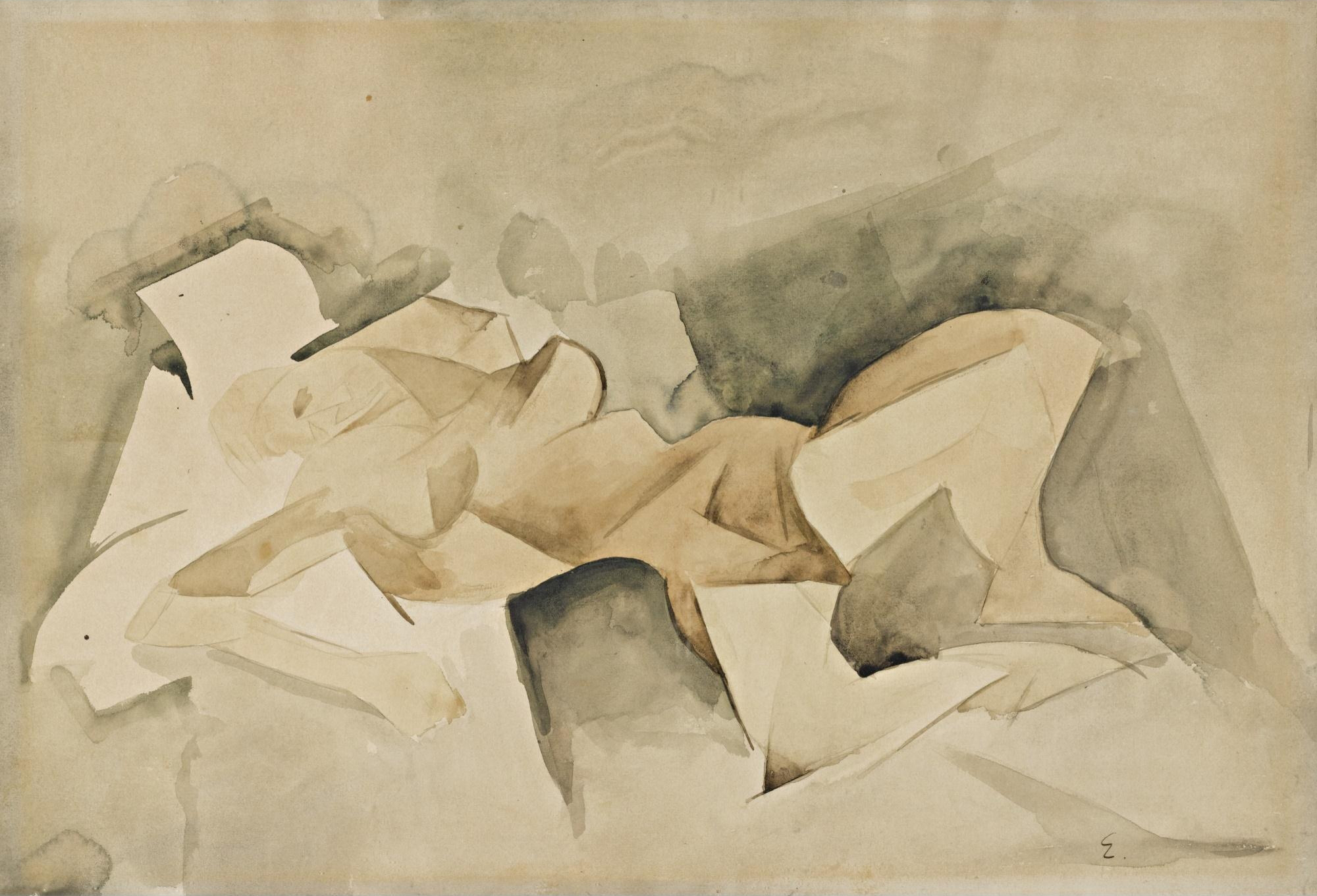
Emil Filla, c.1912, Nude, watercolor on board, 43.18 x 62.23 cm

The most notable participants in this movement were the painters František Kupka (whose interests were rooted more in abstraction), Emil Filla, Bohumil Kubišta, Antonín Procházka, Vincenc Beneš, and Josef Čapek, the sculptor Otto Gutfreund, the writer Karel Čapek, and the architects Pavel Janák, Josef Gočár, Vlastislav Hofman and Josef Chochol. Many of these artists were members of the Mánes Union of Fine Arts. A major division in Czech architecture occurred after 1912 when many young avant-garde artists from Jan Kotĕra and his circle divorced themselves from the Mánes Association. These younger architects were more idealistic in their outlook and criticized the strict rationalism of their forebears, Otto Wagner and Kotĕra. Janák, Gočár, and Hofman founded the group Skupina výtvarných umĕlců (Group of Plastic Artists) and established a journal for the group, Umĕlecký mĕsíčník (Artistic Monthly).

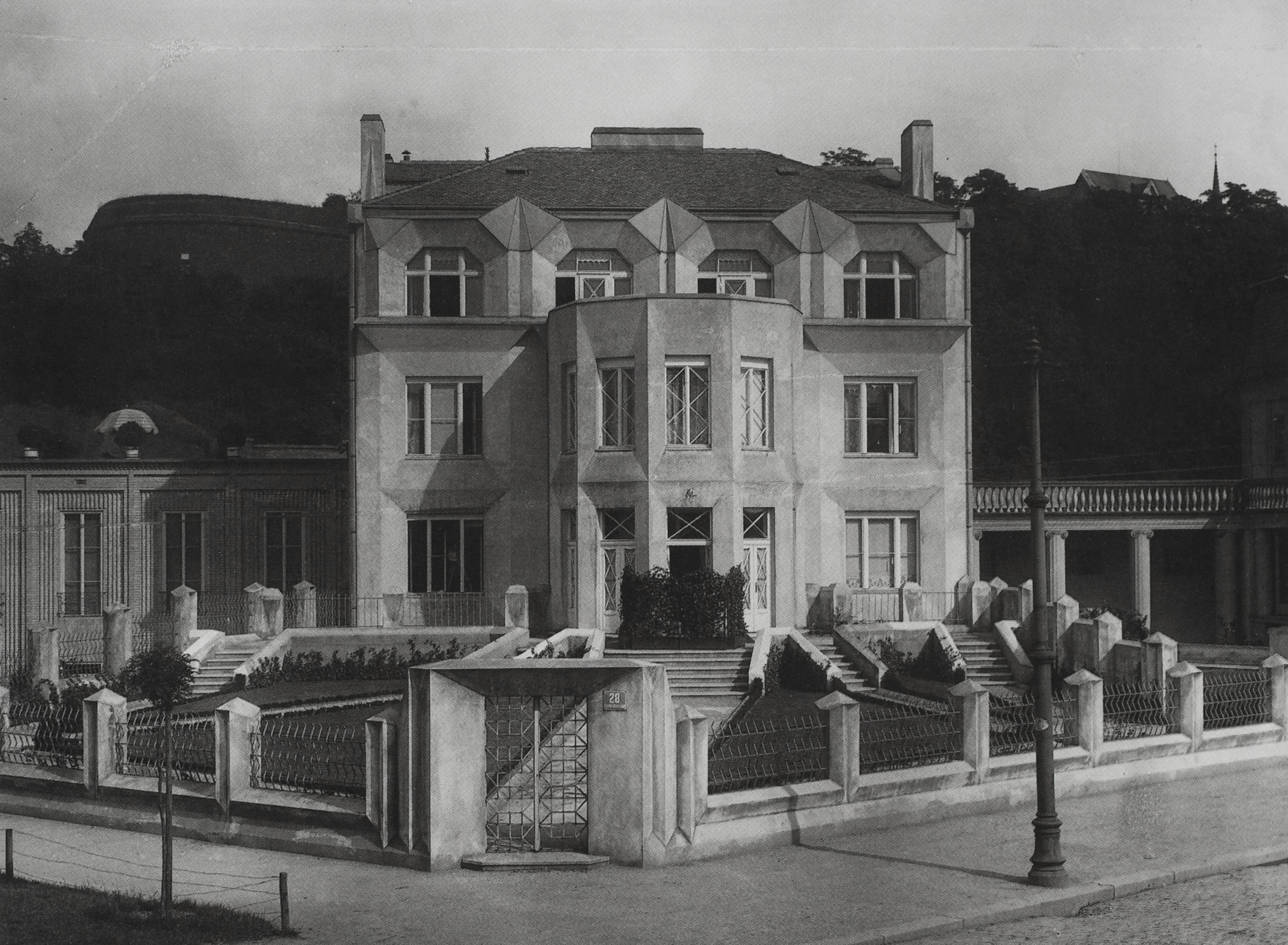
Cubist Kovařovicova villa designed by Josef Chochol, Prague

After Czechoslovakia's founding in 1918, architectural Czech Cubism gradually developed into Czech Rondocubism, which was more decorative, as it was influenced by traditional folk ornaments to celebrate the revival of Czech national independence.

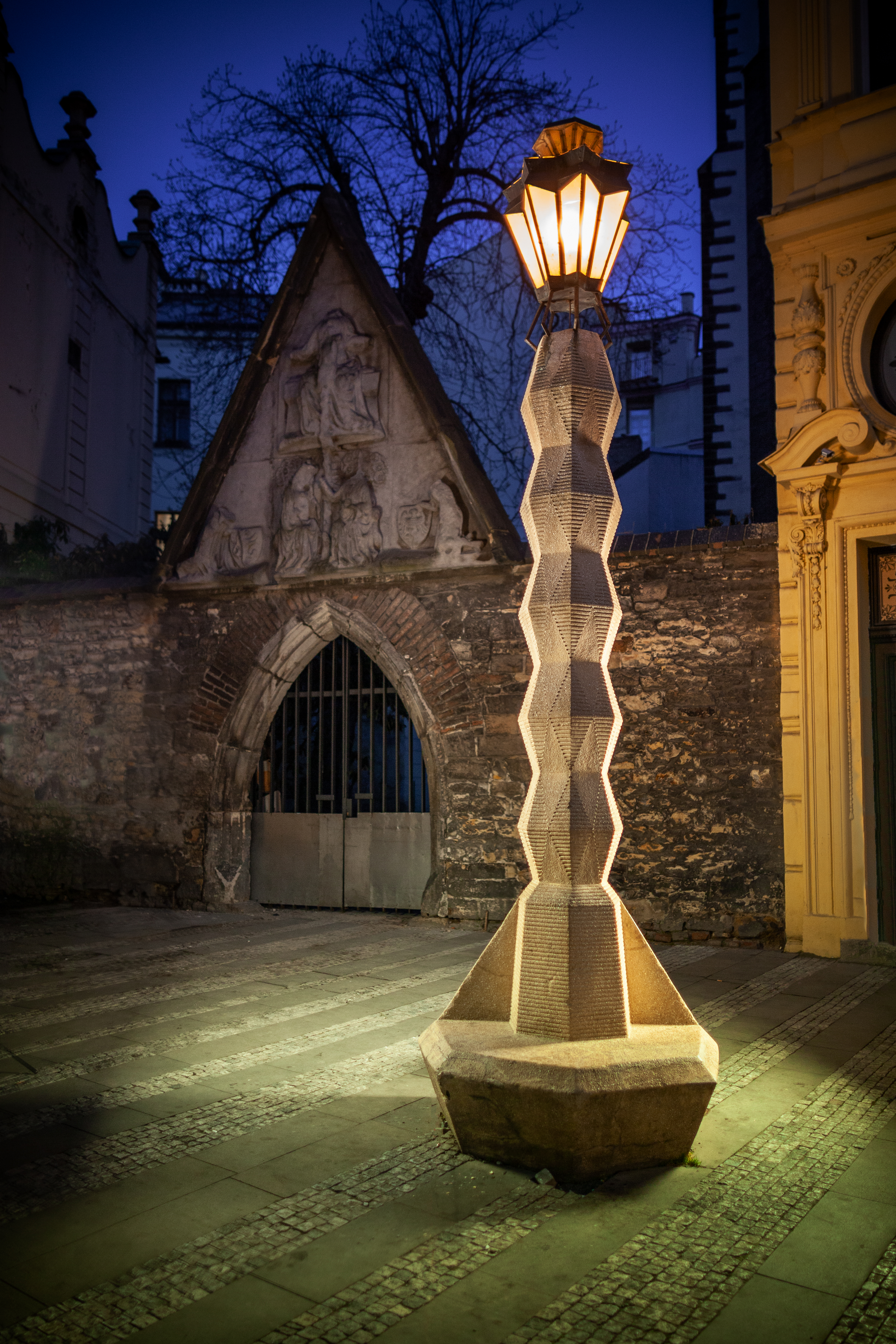
Cubist lamp by Emil Králíček (1913), Jungmannovo náměstí (Prague)

== Concept ==
Czech Cubists distinguish their work through the construction of sharp points, slicing planes, and crystalline shapes in their art works. These angles allowed the Czech Cubists to incorporate their own trademark in the avant-garde art group of Modernism. They believed that objects carried their own inner energy which could only be released by splitting the horizontal and vertical surfaces that restrain the conservative design and “ignore the needs of the human soul.” It was a way to revolt from the typical art scene in the early 1900s in Europe. This evolved into a new art movement, referred to generally as Cubo-Expressionism; combining the fragmentation of form seen in Cubism with the emotionalism of Expressionism.

== History ==
Czech Cubism developed between 1911 and 1914. It was a contemporary development of functionalism generated by architects and designers in Prague. Fifteen years later, the first concept of cubism itself was written off as a decorative purpose, a replacement of secessionism and mistaken departure into ‘aestheticism’ and ‘individualism’. On the contrary, it was a revolt against traditional values of realism.

Czech Cubism was first conceal by the Modern Movement and masked by the aesthetic dictates of Stalinist and post-Stalinist culture in Czechoslovakia. After the Velvet Revolution of 1989 and the post modern attraction of ornamentation and decoration, there came to be a rise of fascination in Czech culture and its own unique forms of cubism. Czech Cubism developed paradoxically as both a product of Czech bourgeois affluence and as an avant-garde rejection of secessionist designers such as Otto Wagner and Jan Kotěra. Architects such as Josef Chochol and Pavel Janák devised spiritualist philosophies of design and a dynamic ideal of planar form derived from cubist art. As Cubism spread across the European continent in the early 20th century, its greatest impact can be seen today in the Czech Republic. Pyramid and crystal forms were one of the signature principles seen in Czech Cubism which was incorporated in architecture, furniture, and applied arts.

== Exhibitions ==
The Museum of Decorative Arts in Prague (UPM) uses the House of the Black Madonna as a permanent exhibition space for Czech Cubist art.

== Gallery ==
=== Painting and sculpture ===
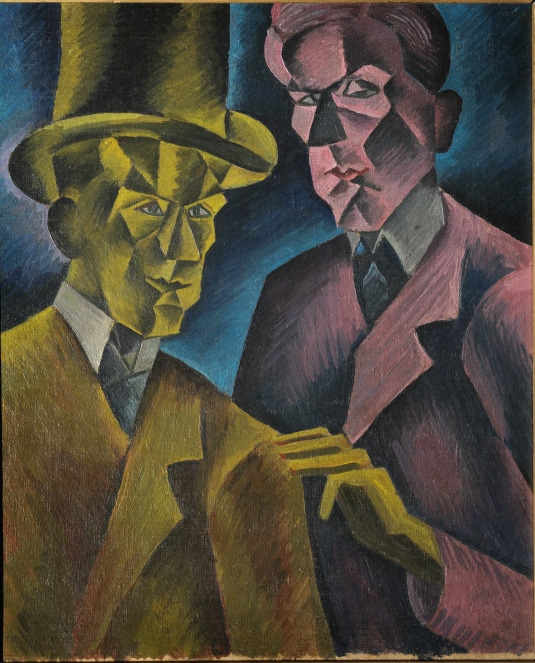
Bohumil Kubišta, 1911, Dvojnik

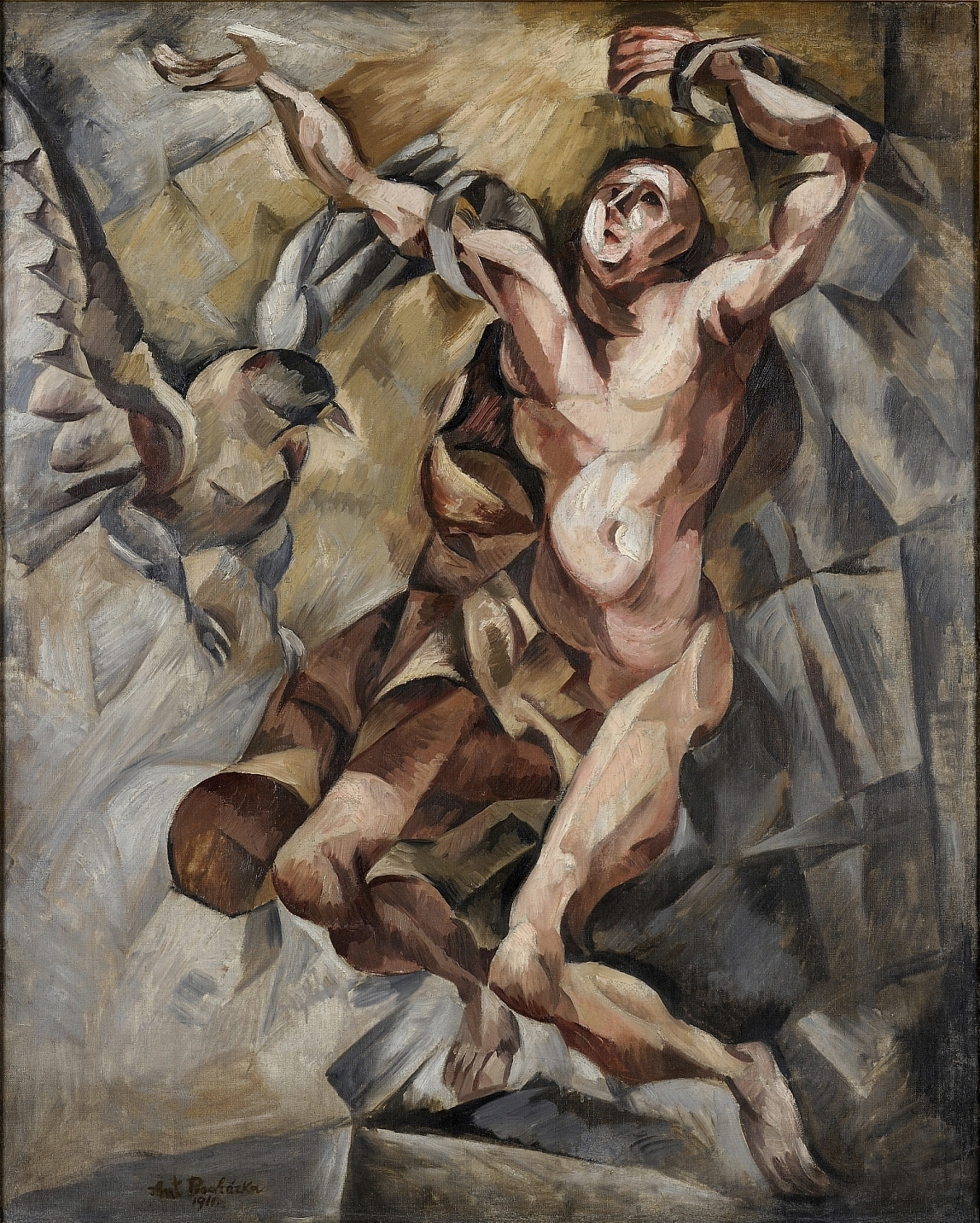
Antonín Procházka, 1911, Prometheus

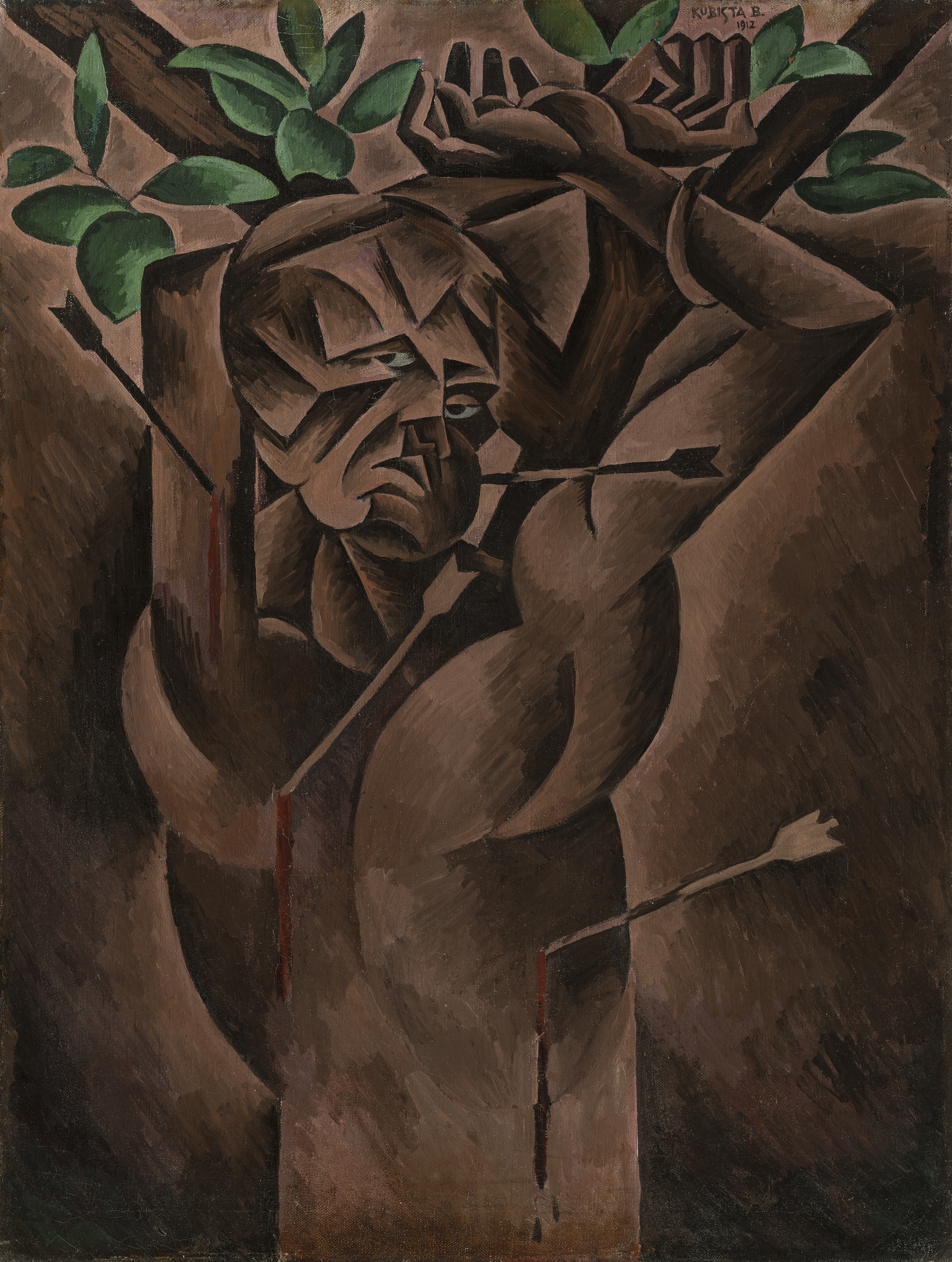
Bohumil Kubišta, 1912, Saint Sebastian, National Gallery Prague

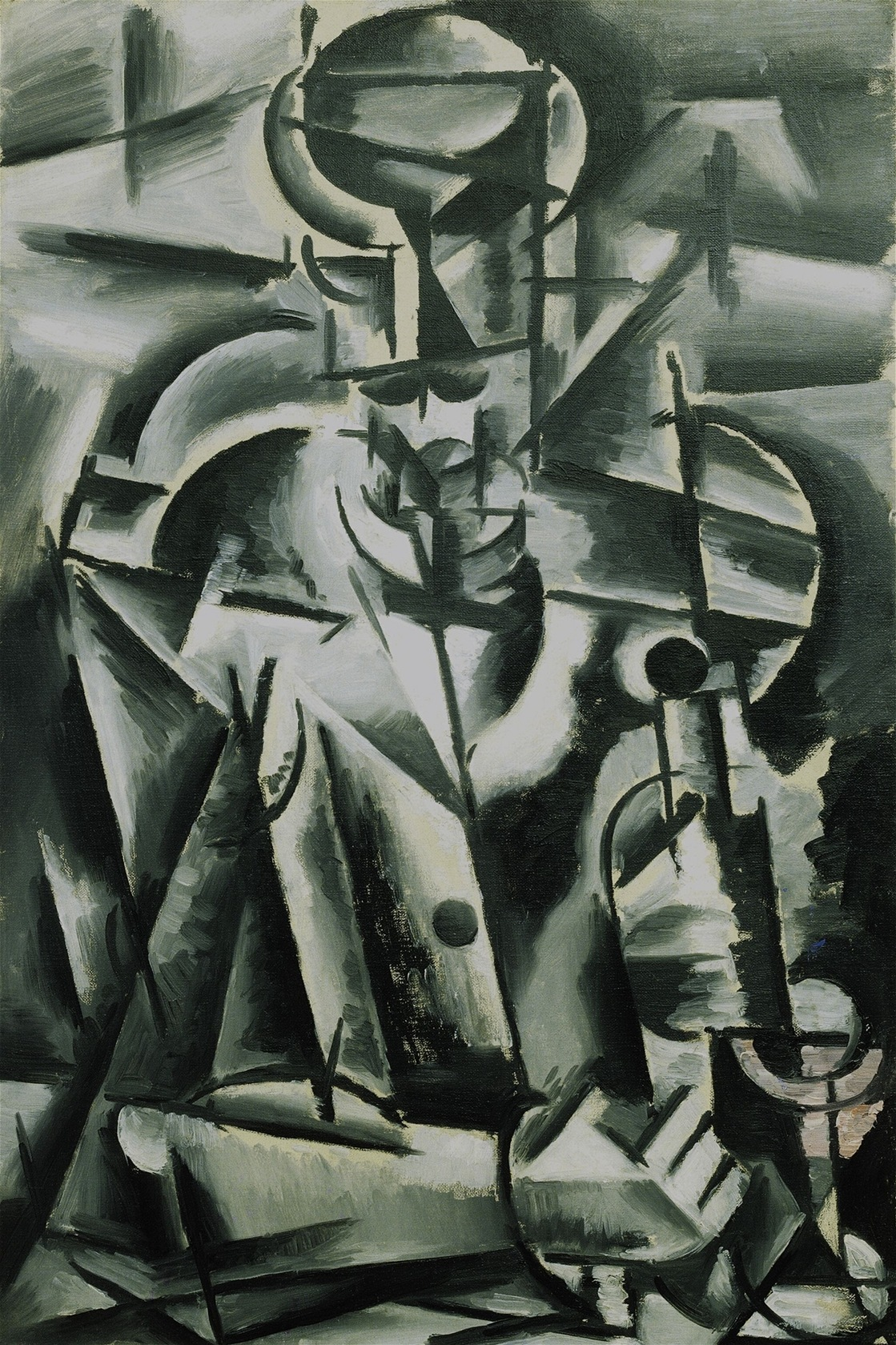
Josef Čapek, 1913, Piják

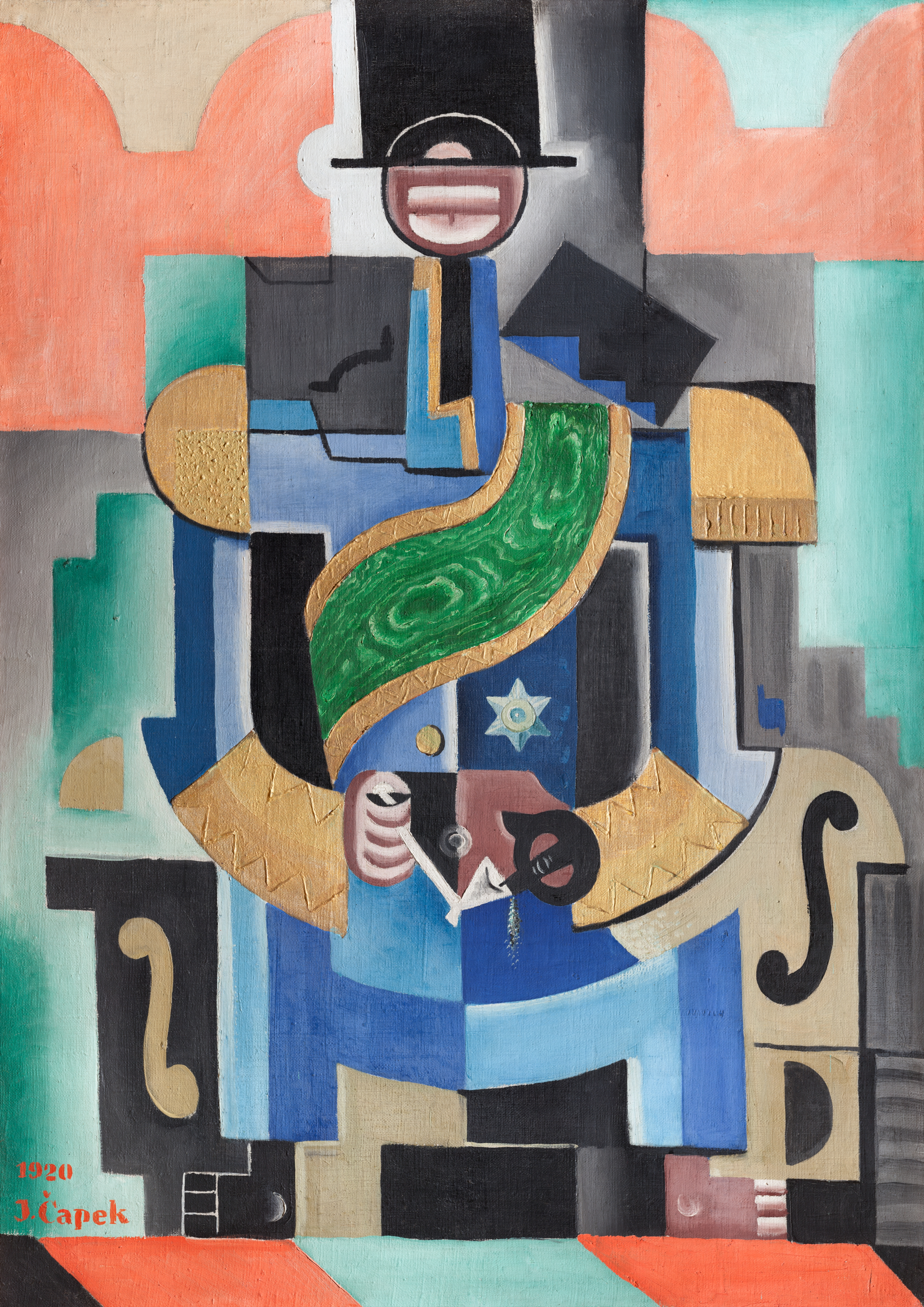
Josef Čapek, 1920, African King, National Gallery Prague

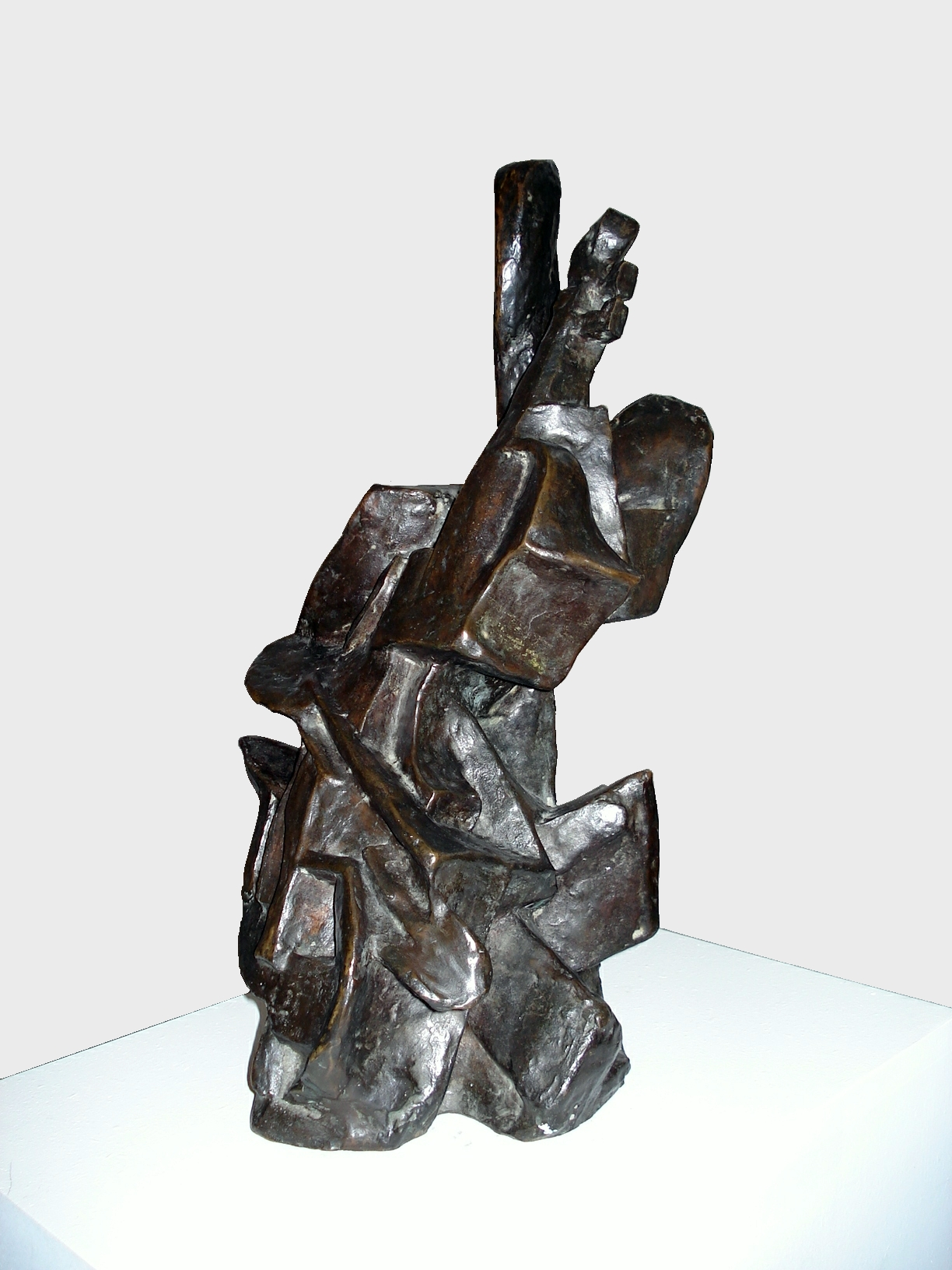
Otto Gutfreund, 1912–13, Cellista (Cello player), Museum Kampa, Prague

=== Architecture ===
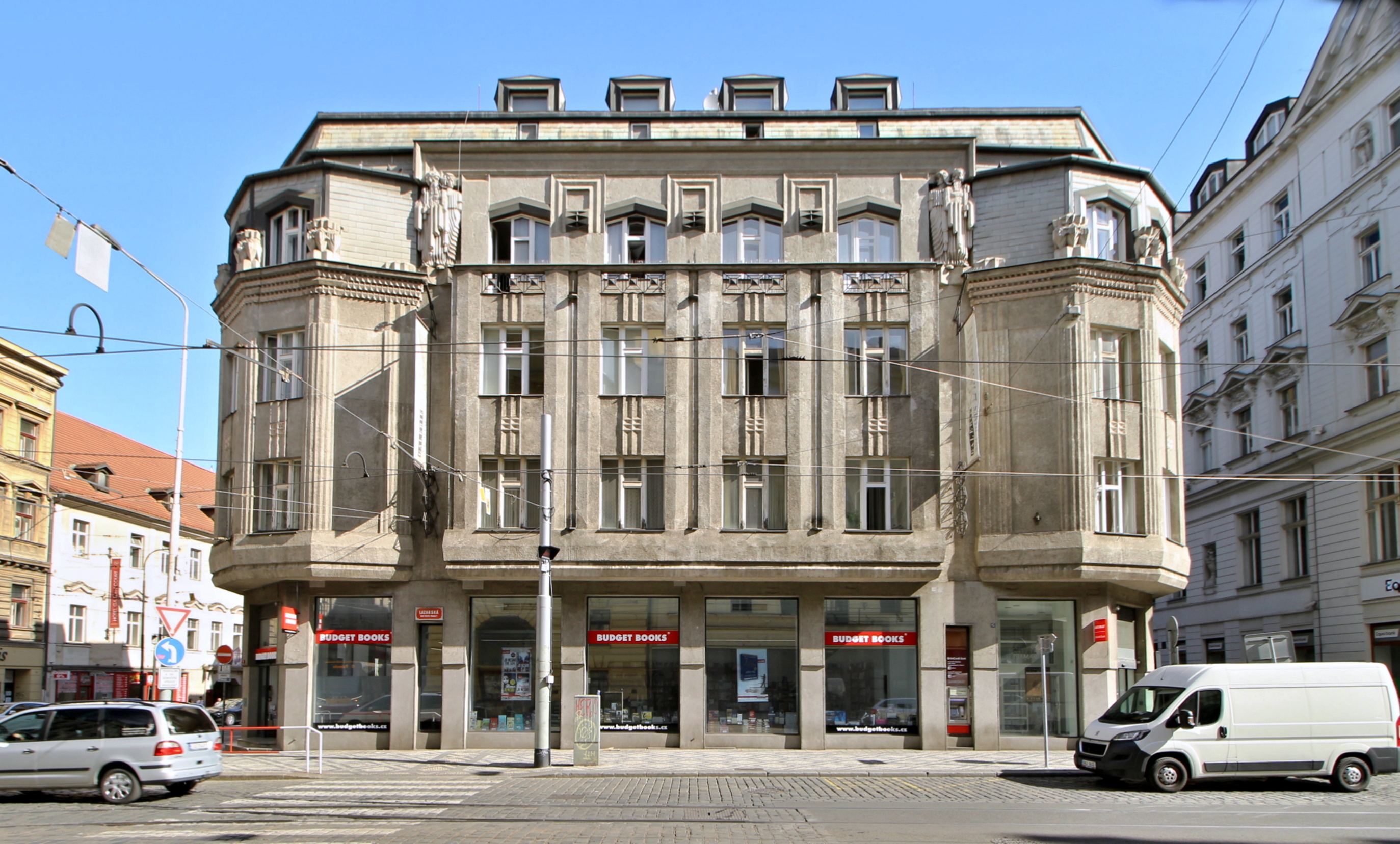
Diamant Palace by Emil Králíček (1912–1913)

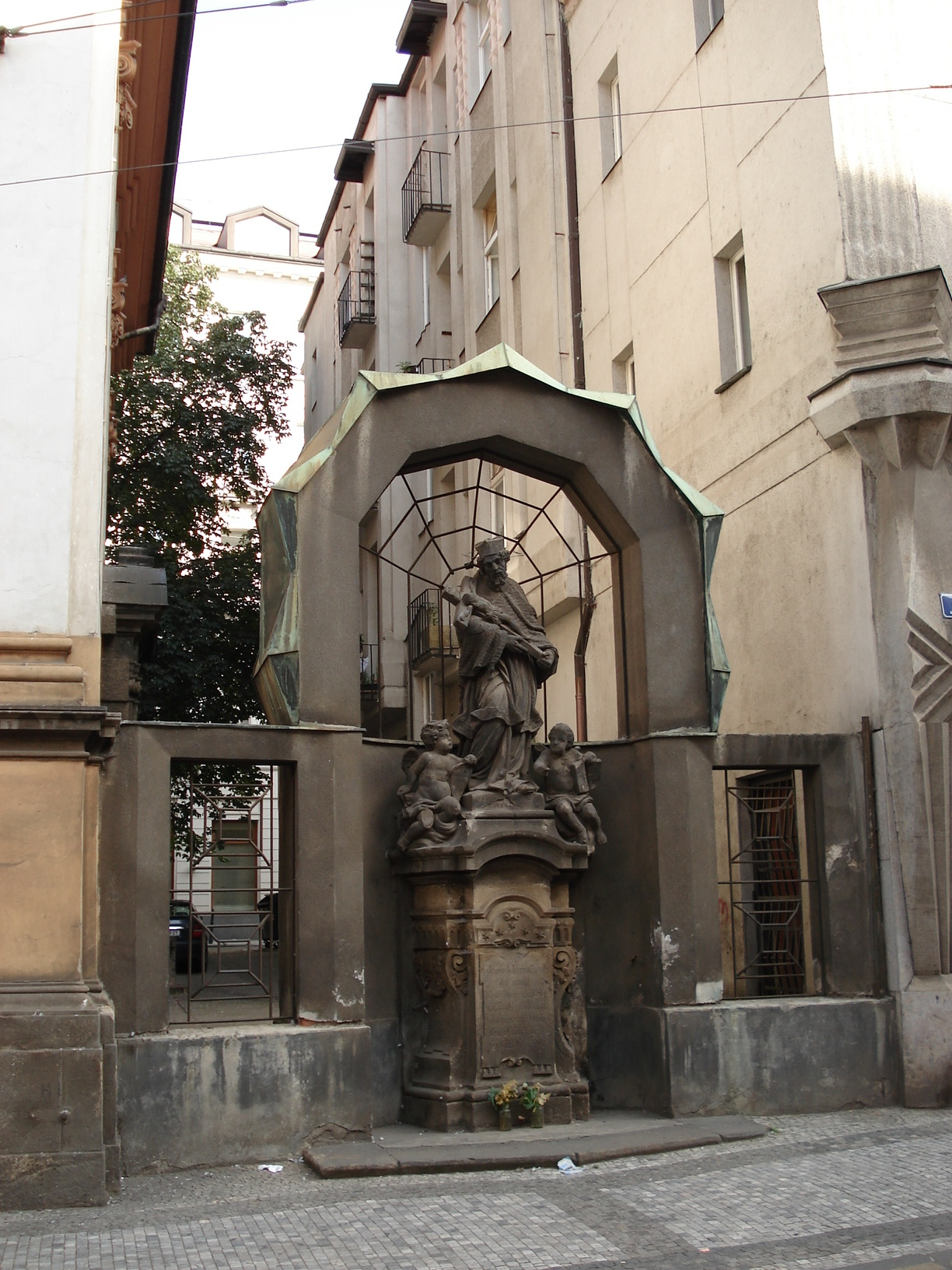
Arch with baroque statue, next to the Diamant Palace

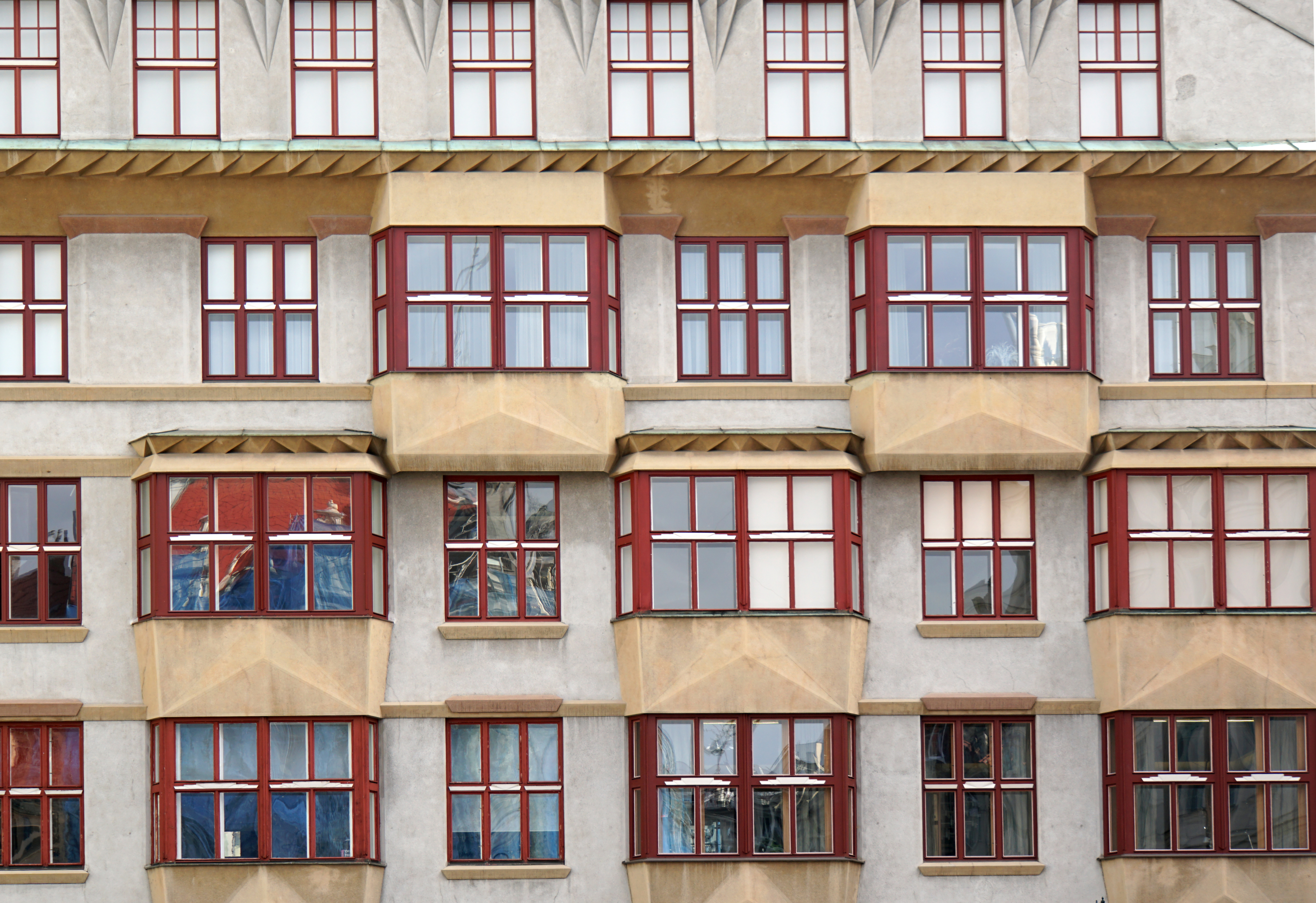
Facades by Otakar Novotný

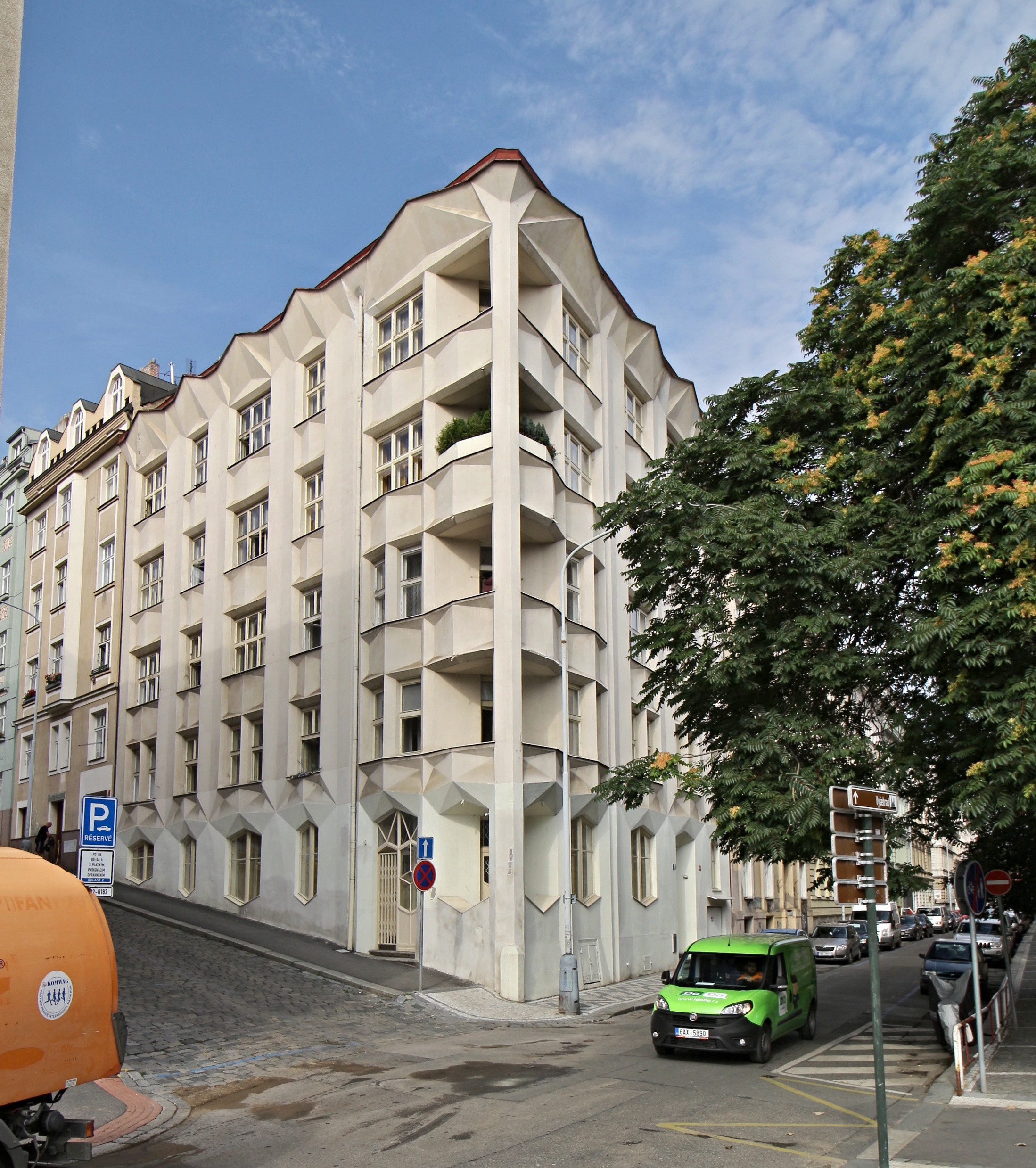
Cubist apartment building, Vyšehrad č. p. 98, by Josef Chochol (1913–1914)

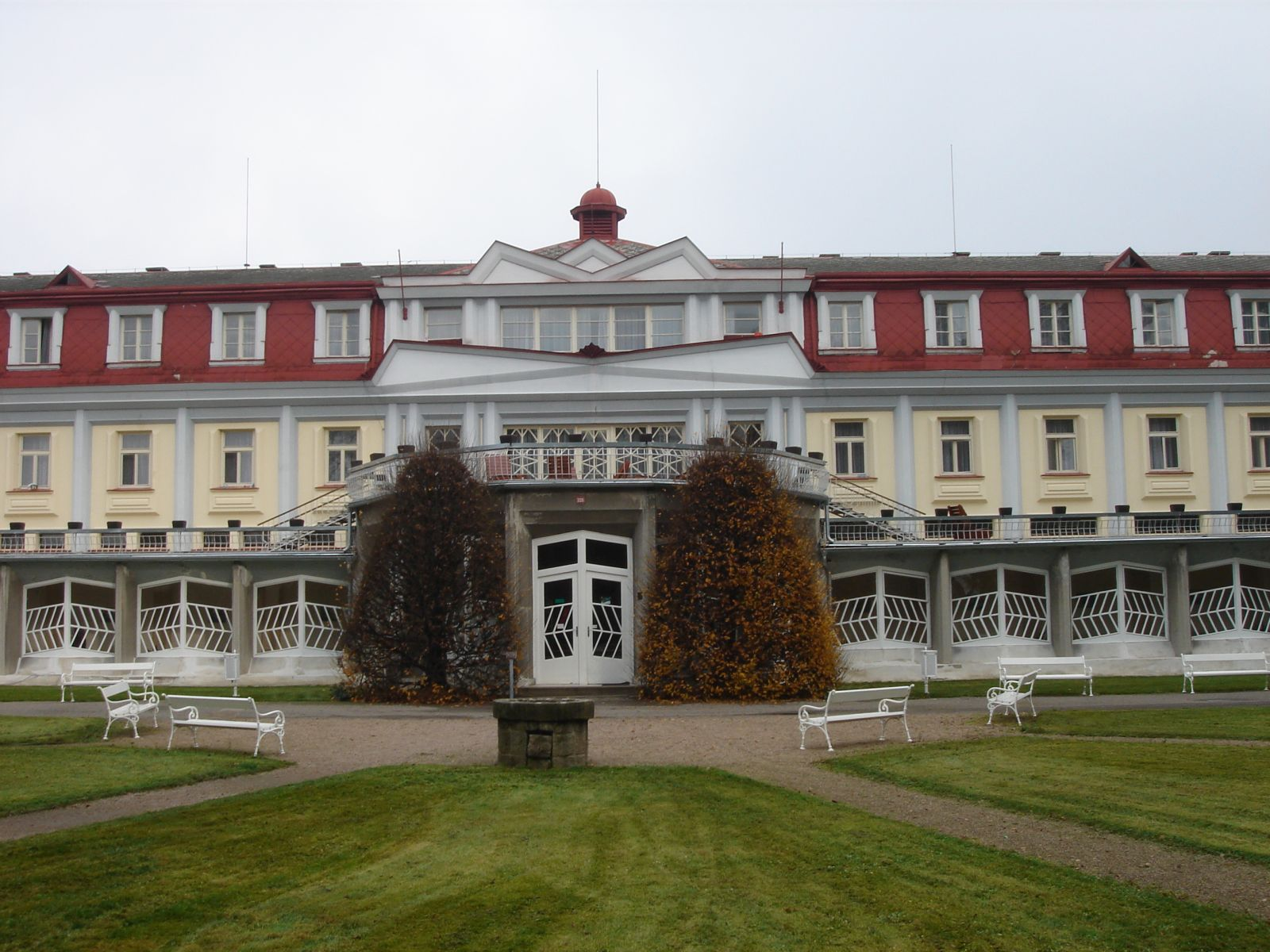
Thermal baths in Lázně Bohdaneč by Josef Gočár (1911–1913)

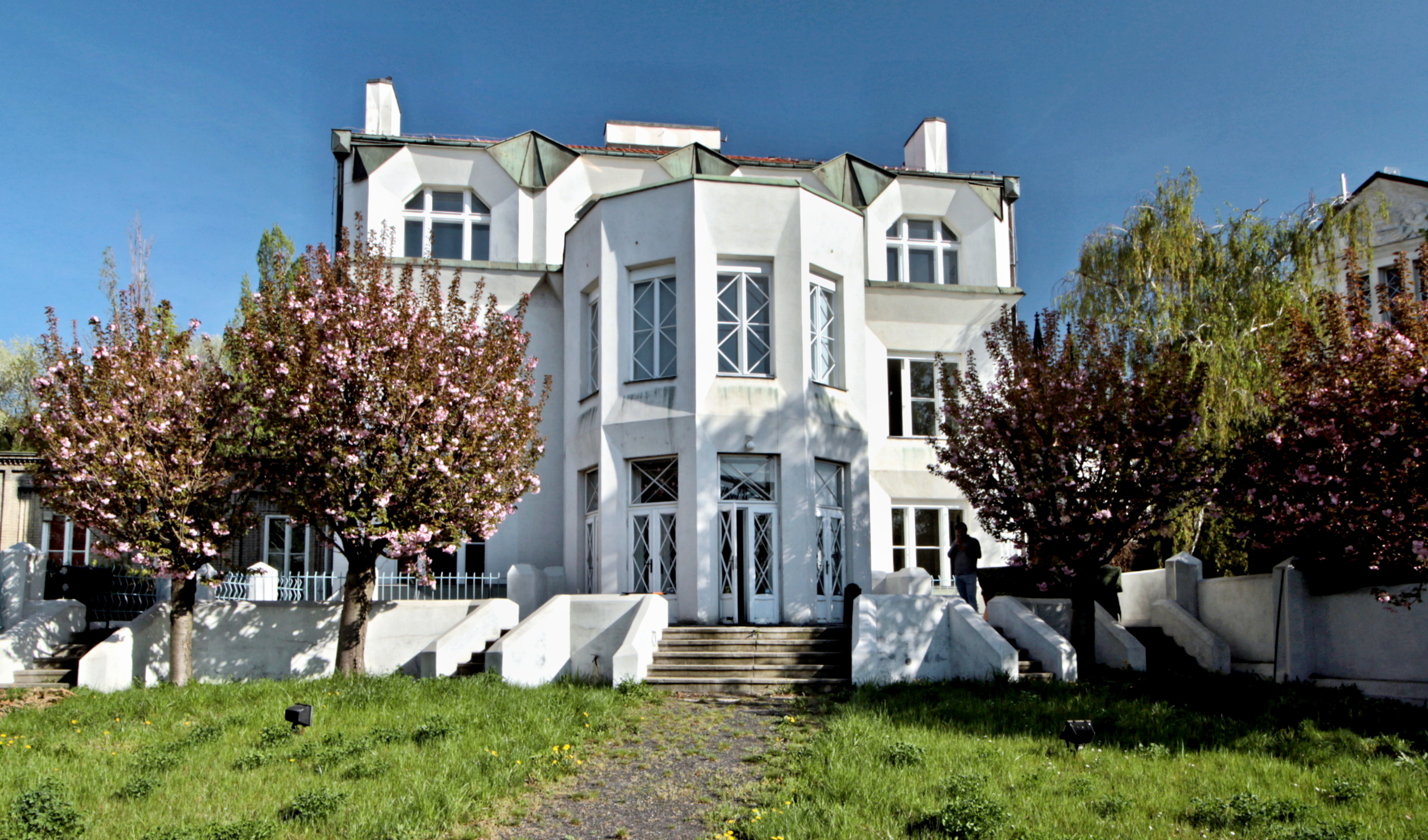
Kovařovicova villa by Chochol (1912–1913)

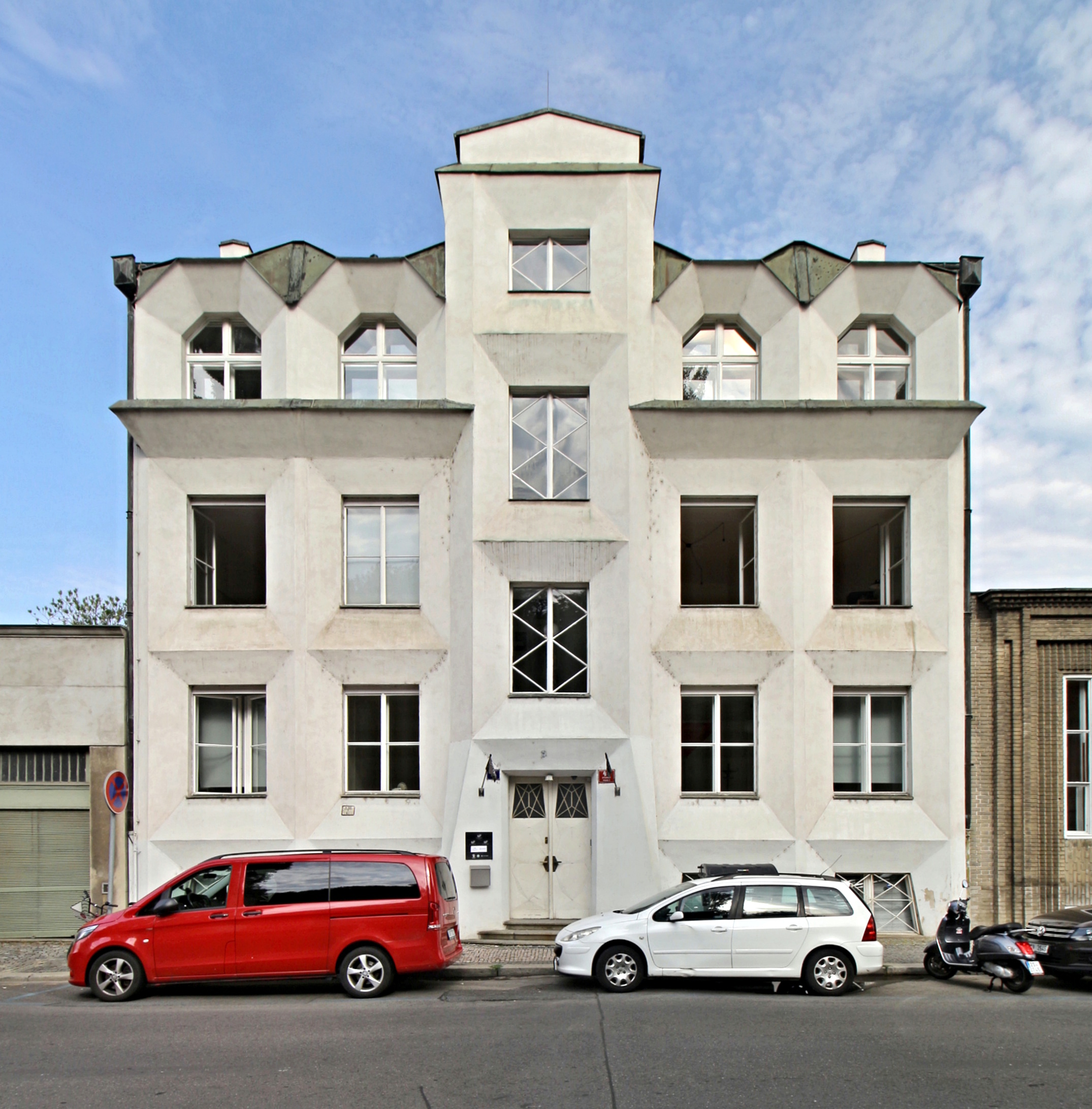
Kovařovicova villa, street side

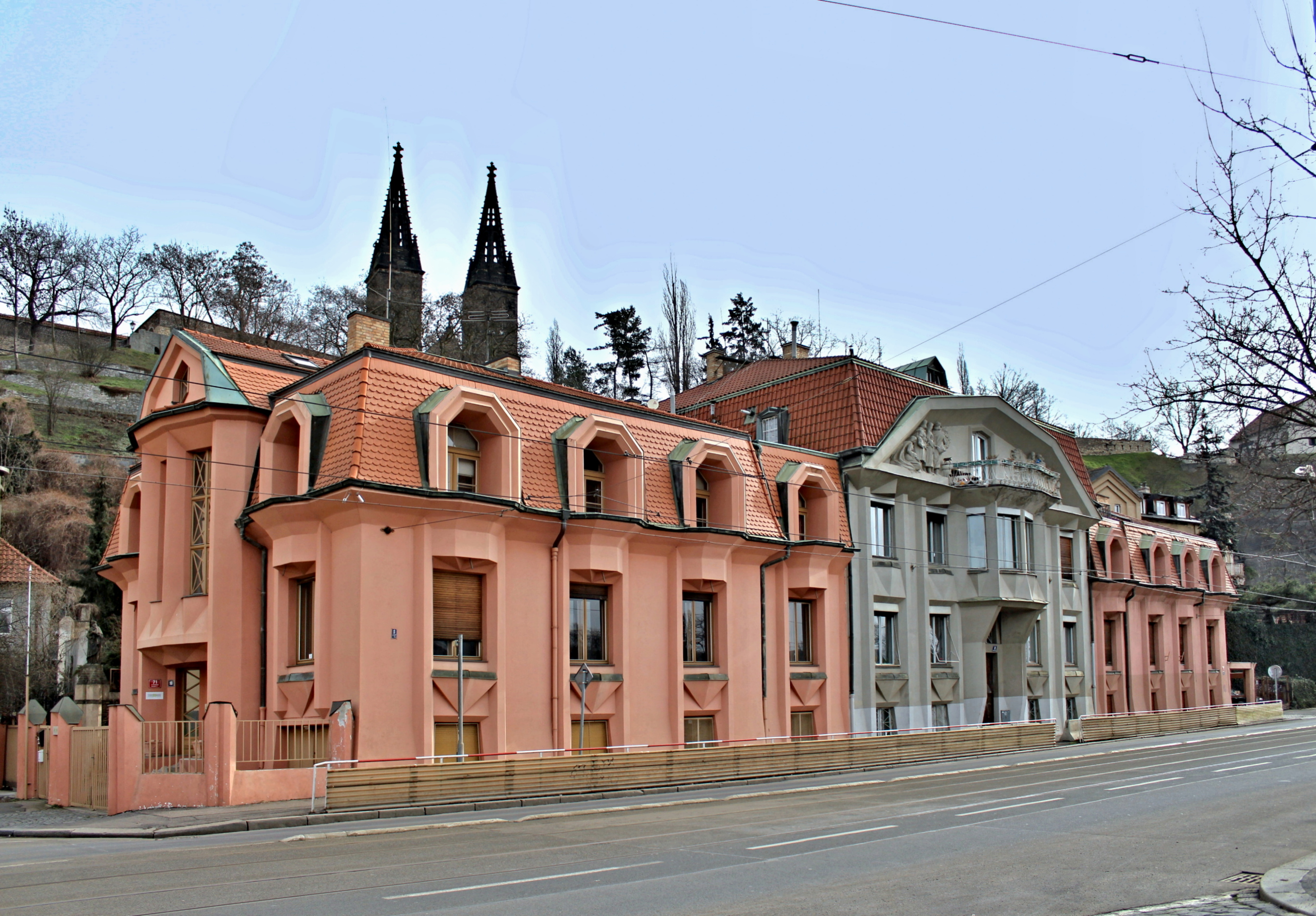
Cubist building by Chochol

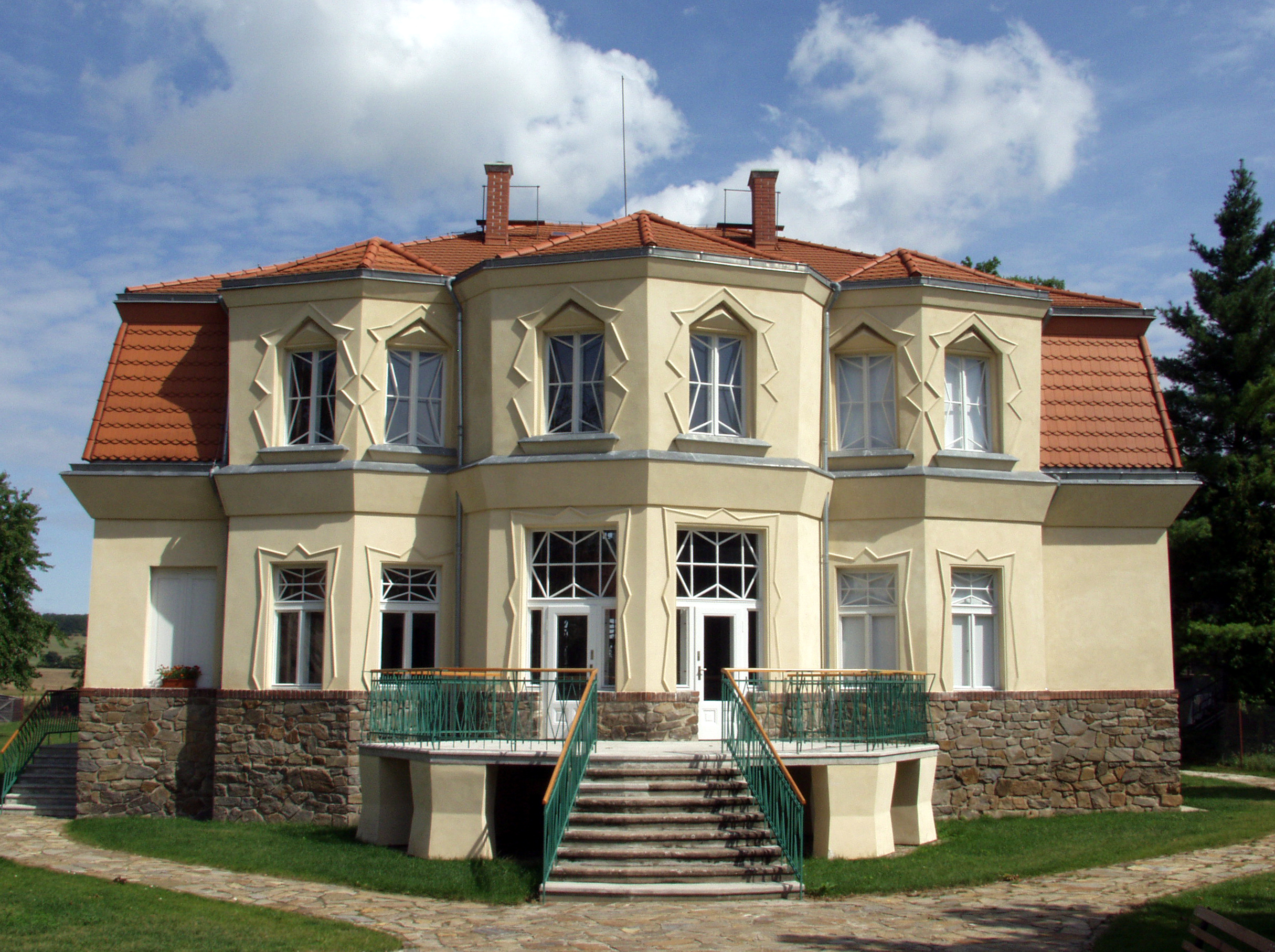
Bauer Villa by Gočár (1912–1914)

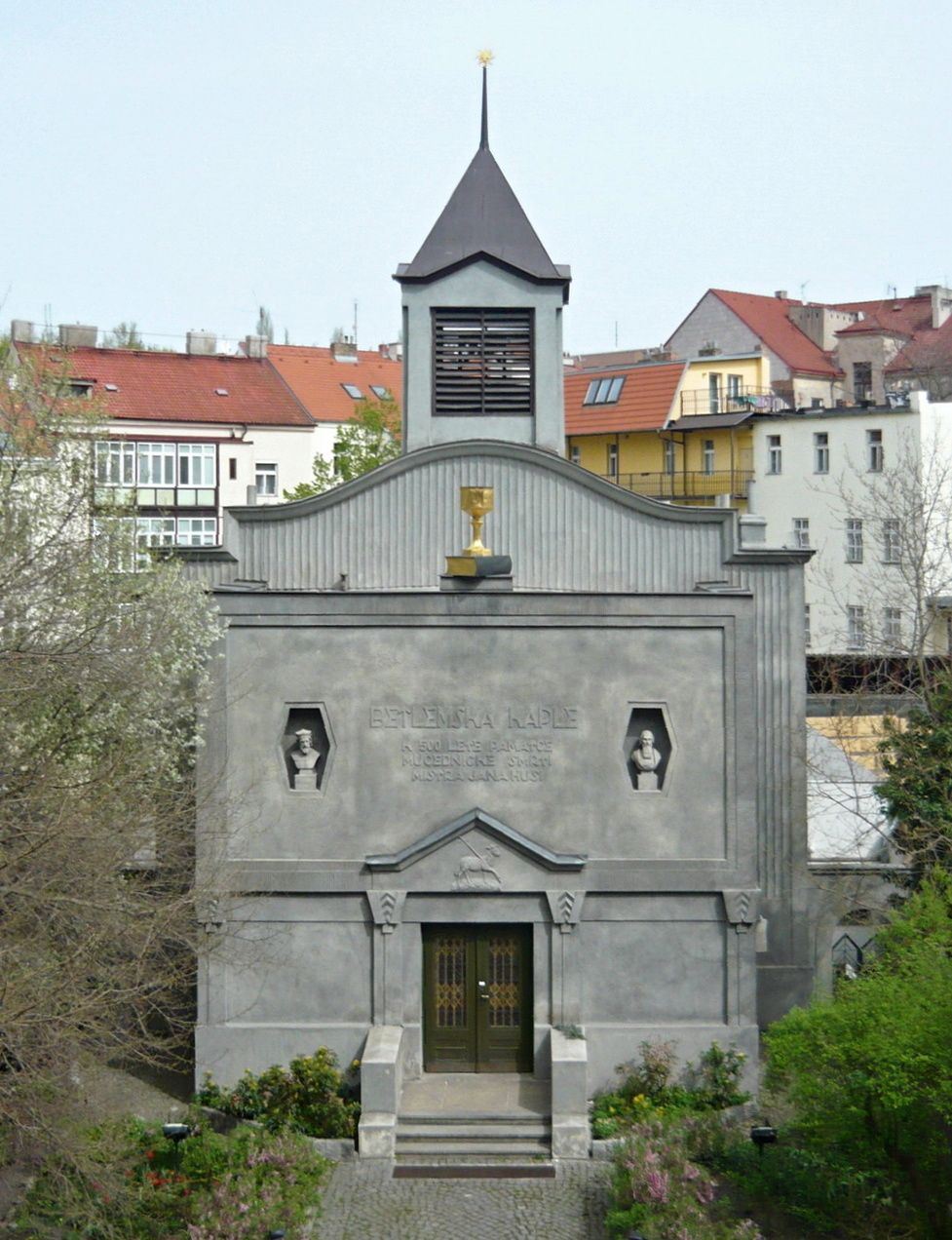
Cubist chapel by Králíček (1913–1914)

== See also ==
- Cubist sculpture

== References and sources ==
Sources

- The Czech Cubism Foundation (in English)
- What is Czech Cubism? (in English)
- Von Vegesack, Alexander, ed. Czech Cubism: Architecture, Furniture, Decorative Arts. Princeton: Princeton Architectural Press, 1992.
- Journal of Design History (in English)
- Toman, Jindrich. Czech Cubism and the Book: The Modern Czech Book. New York: Kant Publications, 2011.
