= Emil Králíček =

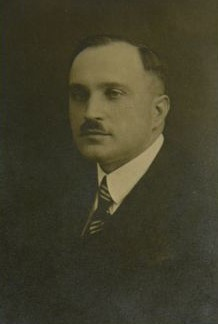
Emil Králíček

Emil Králíček (11 October 1877 – 26 March 1930) was a Czech architect.

Králíček studied at Prague Industrial Arts School and in the offices of Antonin Balsanek in Prague and Joseph Maria Olbrich in Darmstadt. He began designing in Prague around 1900 in the office of Matěj Blecha, and worked in the styles of classicism, Art Nouveau, Czech Cubism and Czech Rondocubism successively. Beginning as draftsman Králíček worked himself into a position of project manager, and developed collaborations with a number of Czech sculptors like Celda Klouček, Antonín Waigant and Karel Pavlík.

Králíček started his own office in 1920, and committed suicide ten years afterward.

== Projects ==
Work includes:

- Hotel Zlatá Husa, Wenceslas Square in Prague, with Matěj Blecha, 1909-1910
- Adam Pharmacy, at #8 Wenceslas Square, with Blecha, 1911-1913
- the Diamant House in Prague, with Blecha, 1912-1913
- Šupich Building, now the Moravian Bank, Wenceslas Square, possible attribution with Blecha

== Gallery ==
Emil Králíček designs

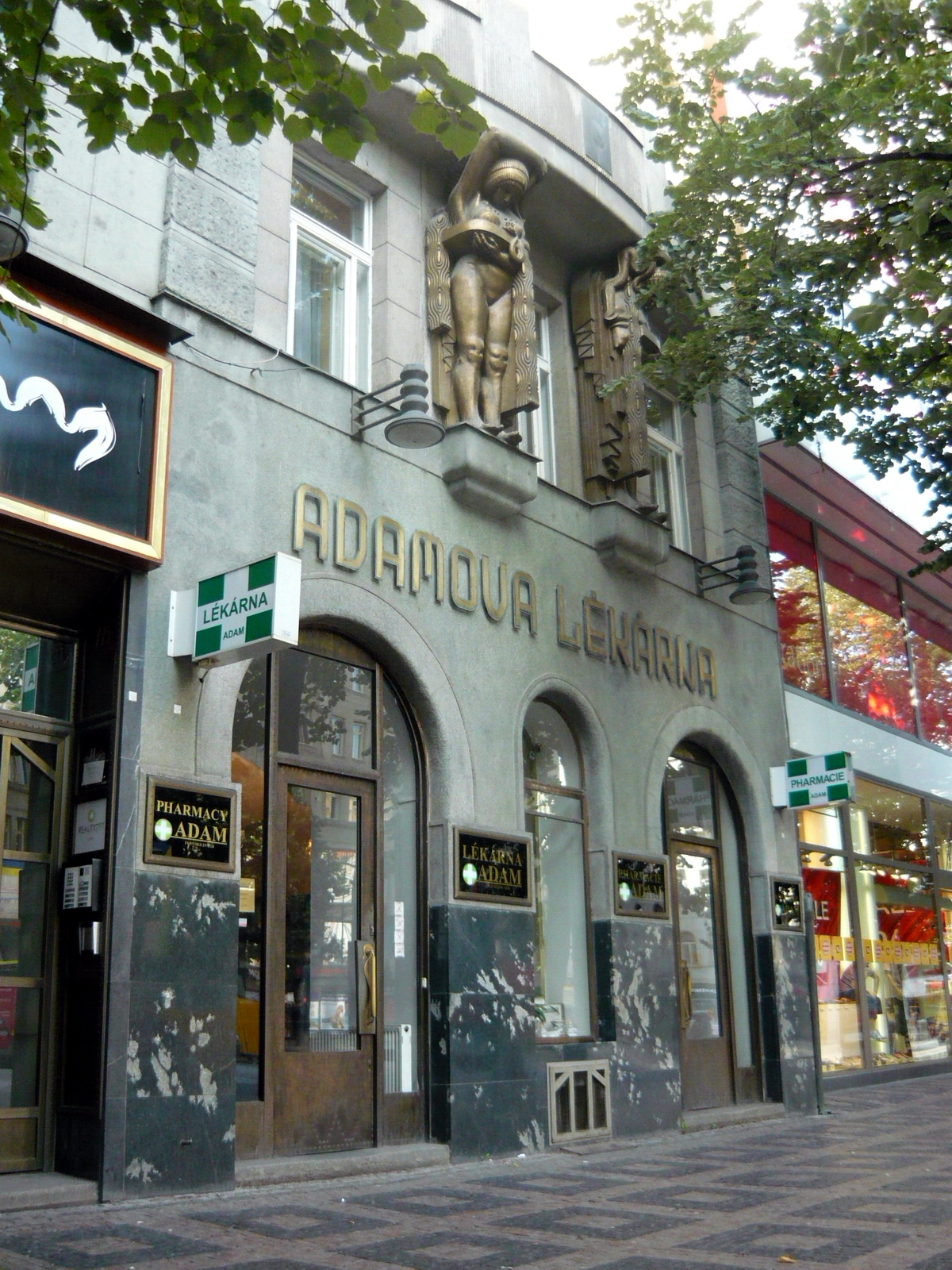
Adam Pharmacy, Prague, 1911-1913, entrance

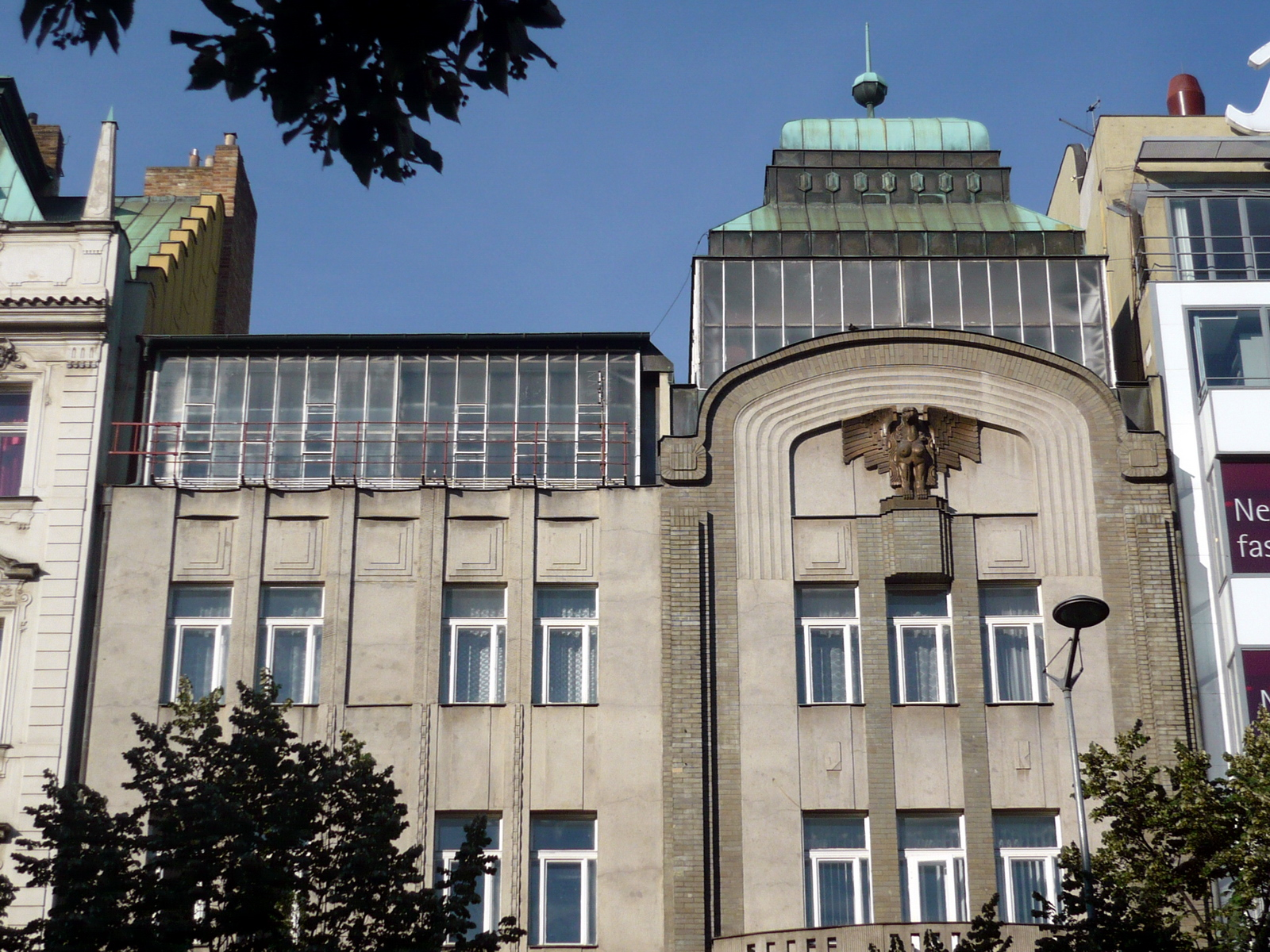
Adam Pharmacy, Prague, 1911-1913, elevation

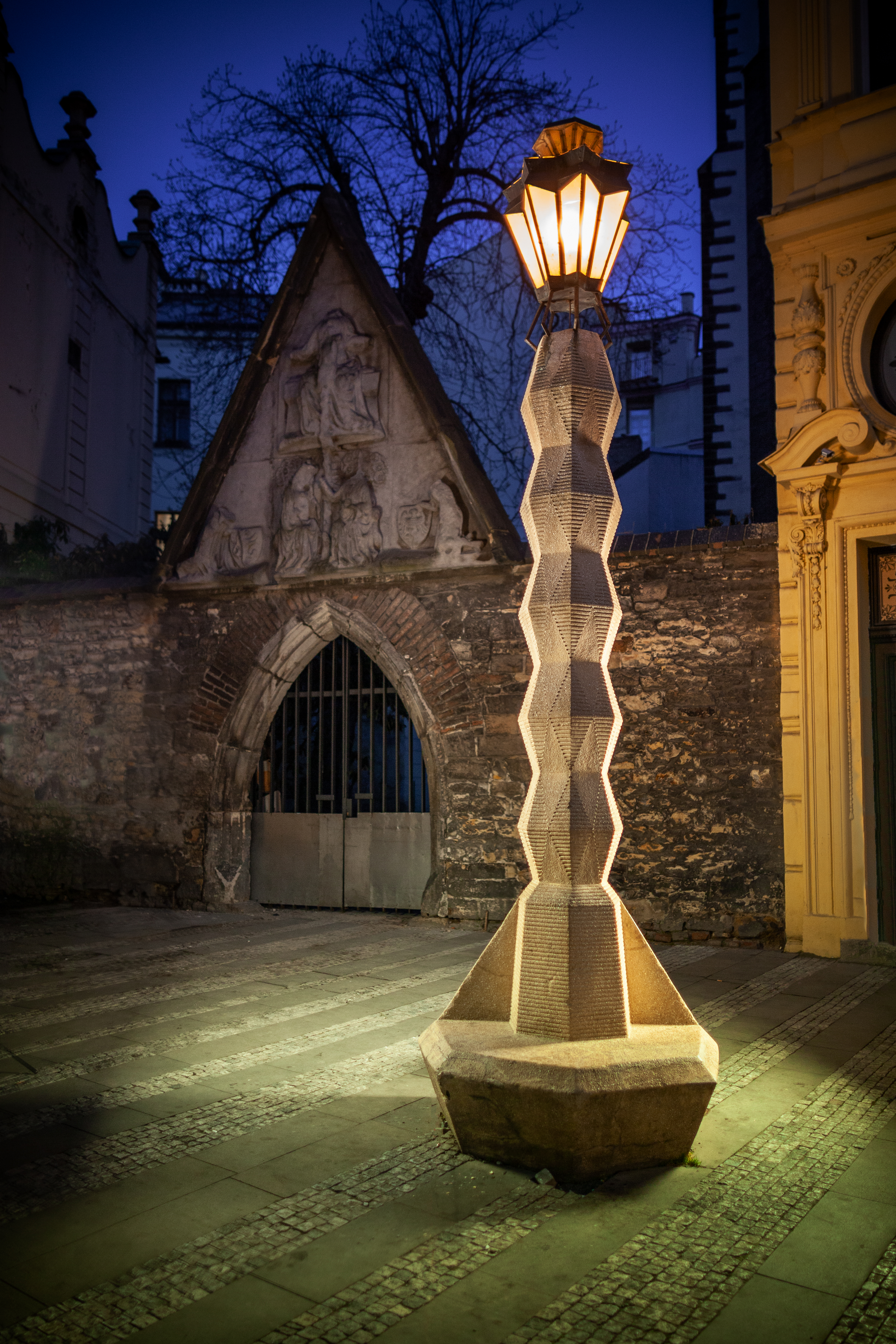
Cubist lantern near Adam Pharmacy, Prague, 1911-1913

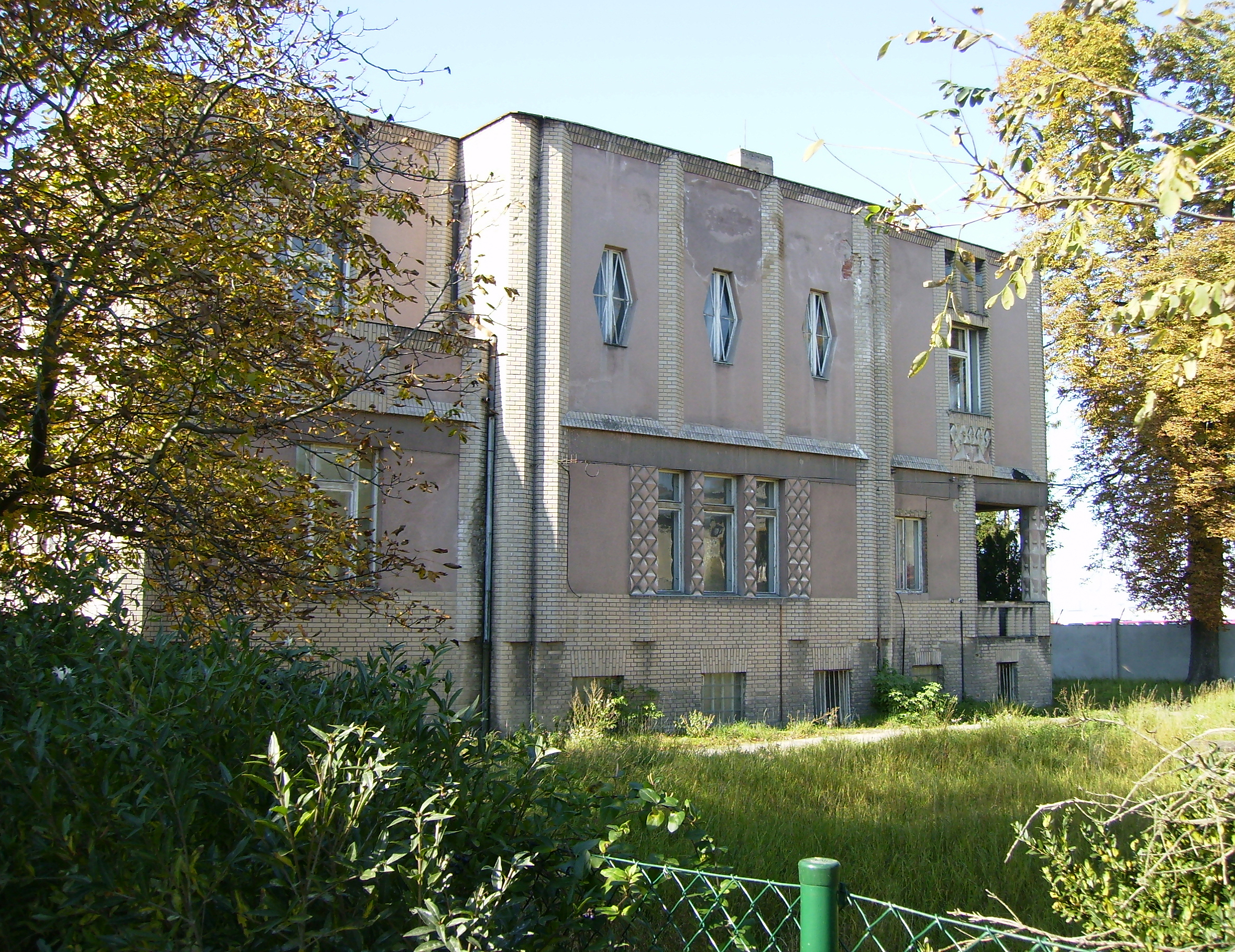
Villa Benies, Litol, 1912-1913

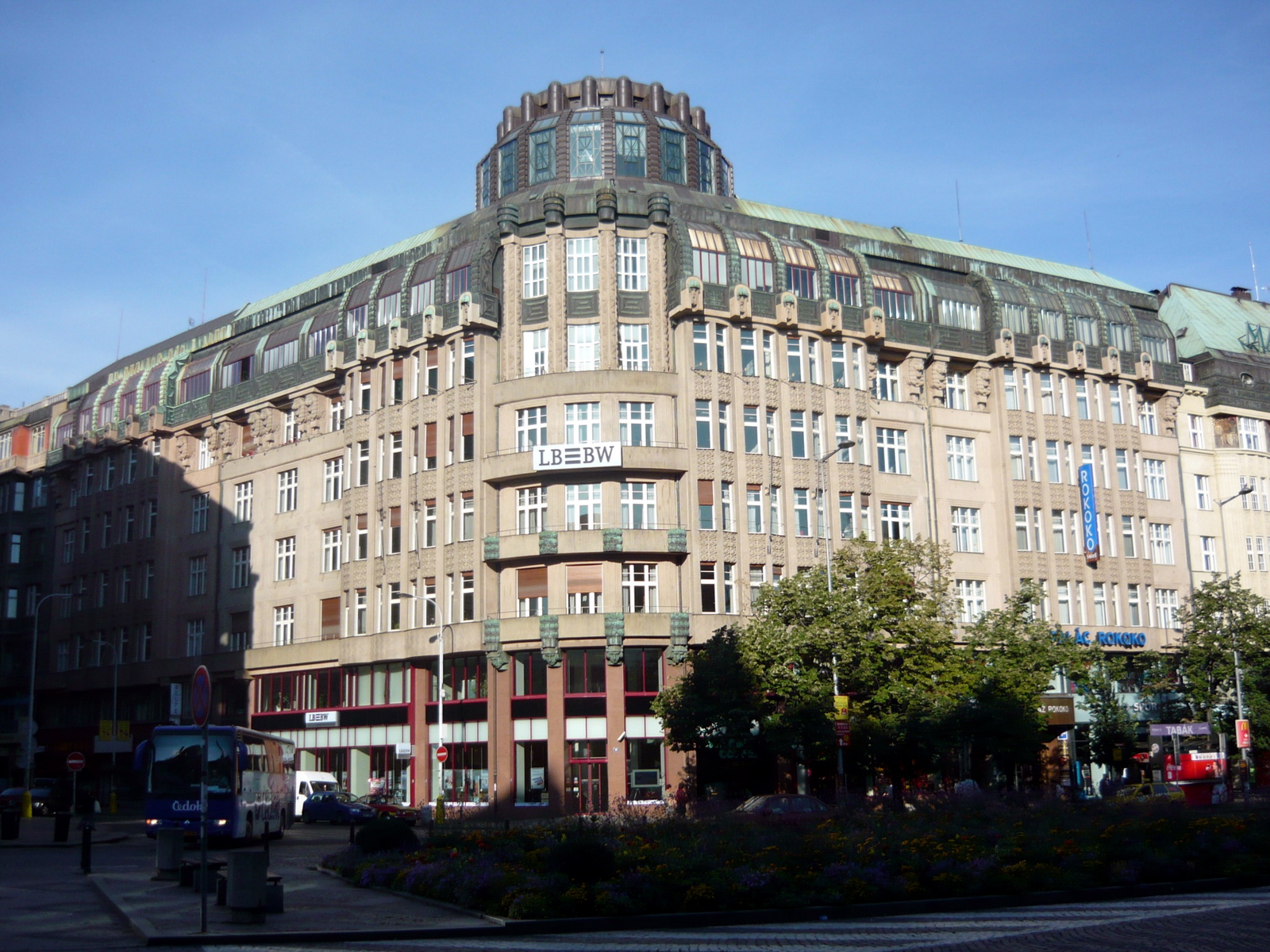
Šupich houses, Prague, 1911-1919

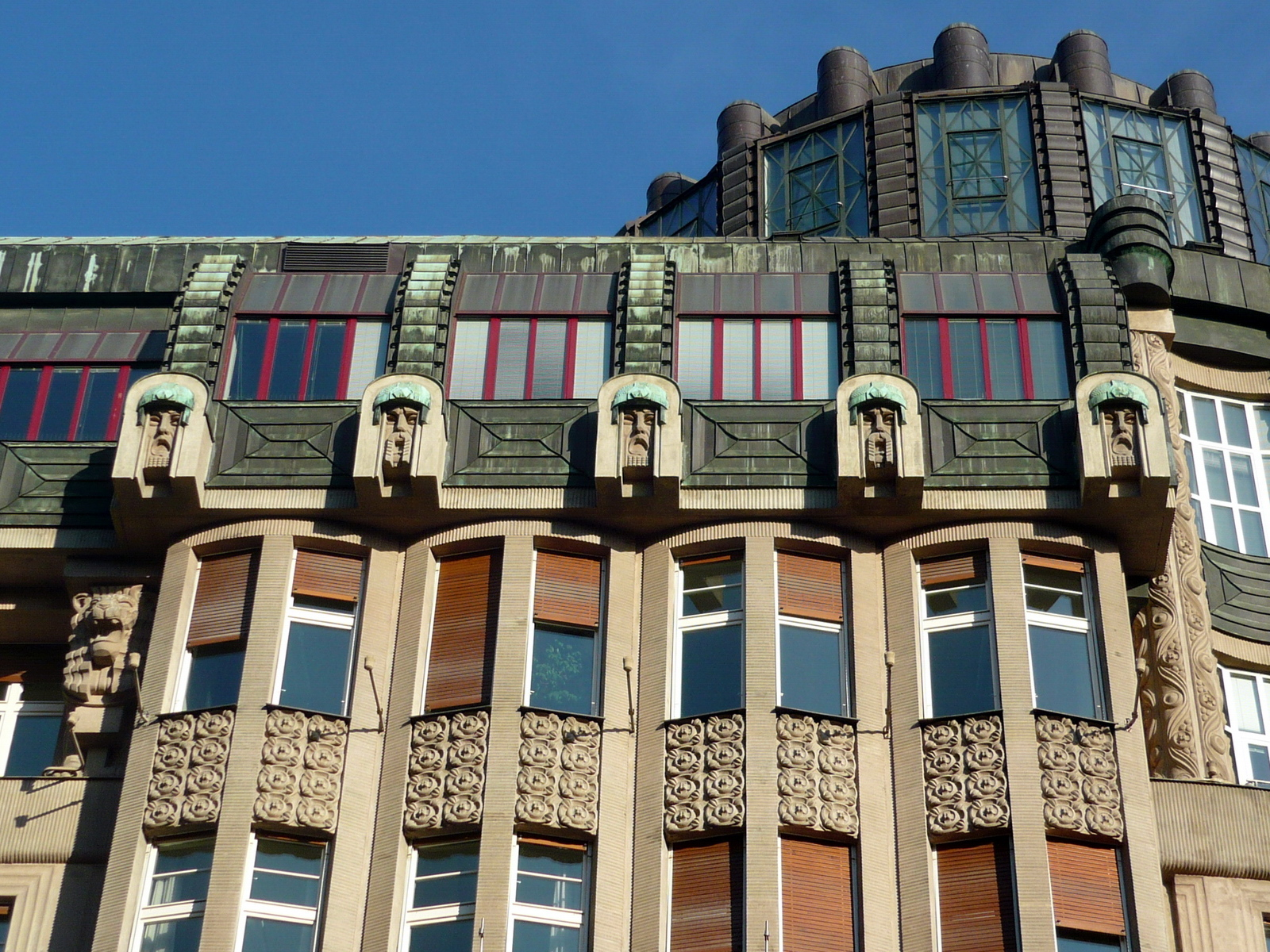
Šupich houses, Prague, 1911-1919, elevation detail

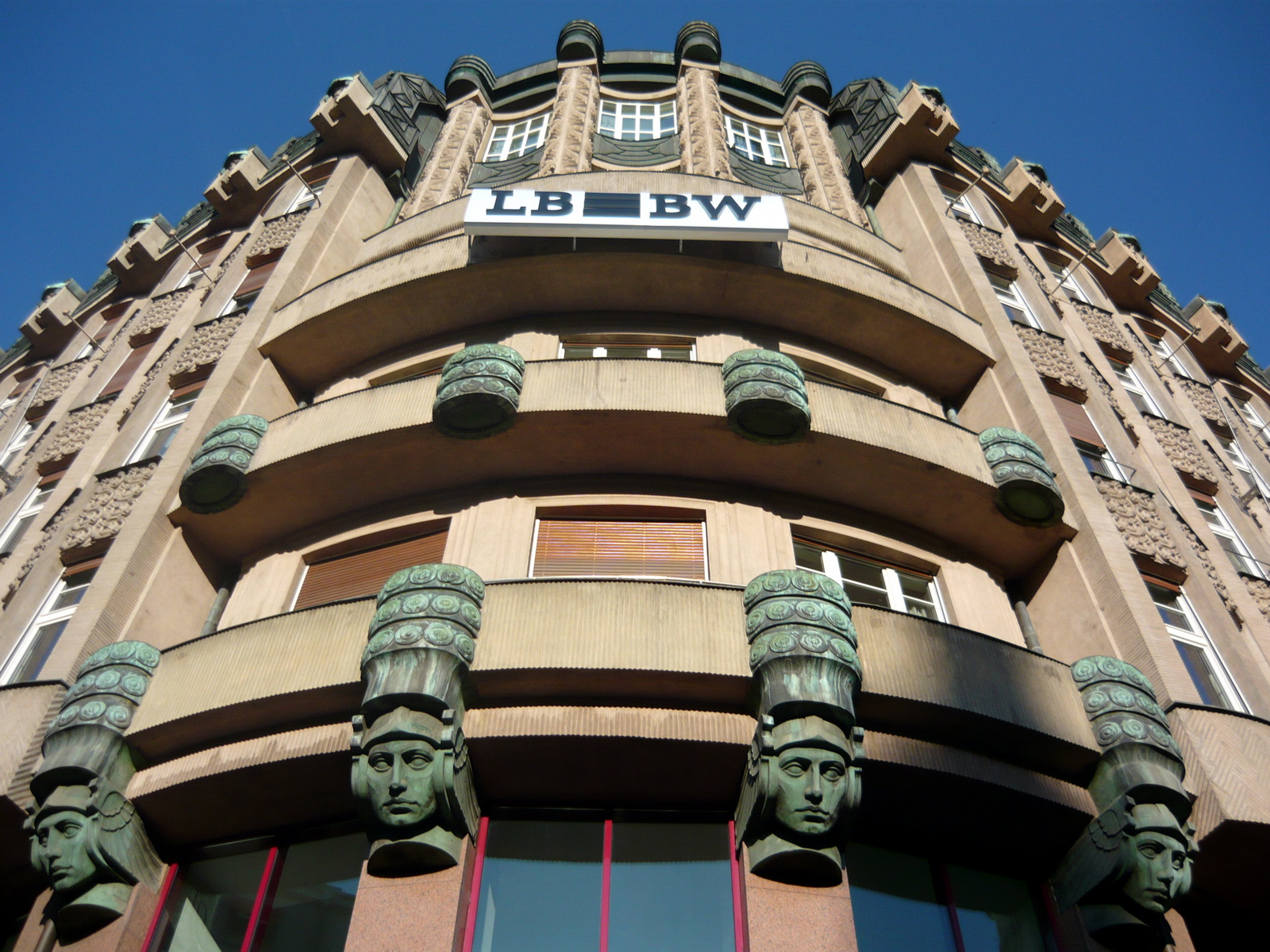
Šupich houses, Prague, 1911-1919, elevation detail

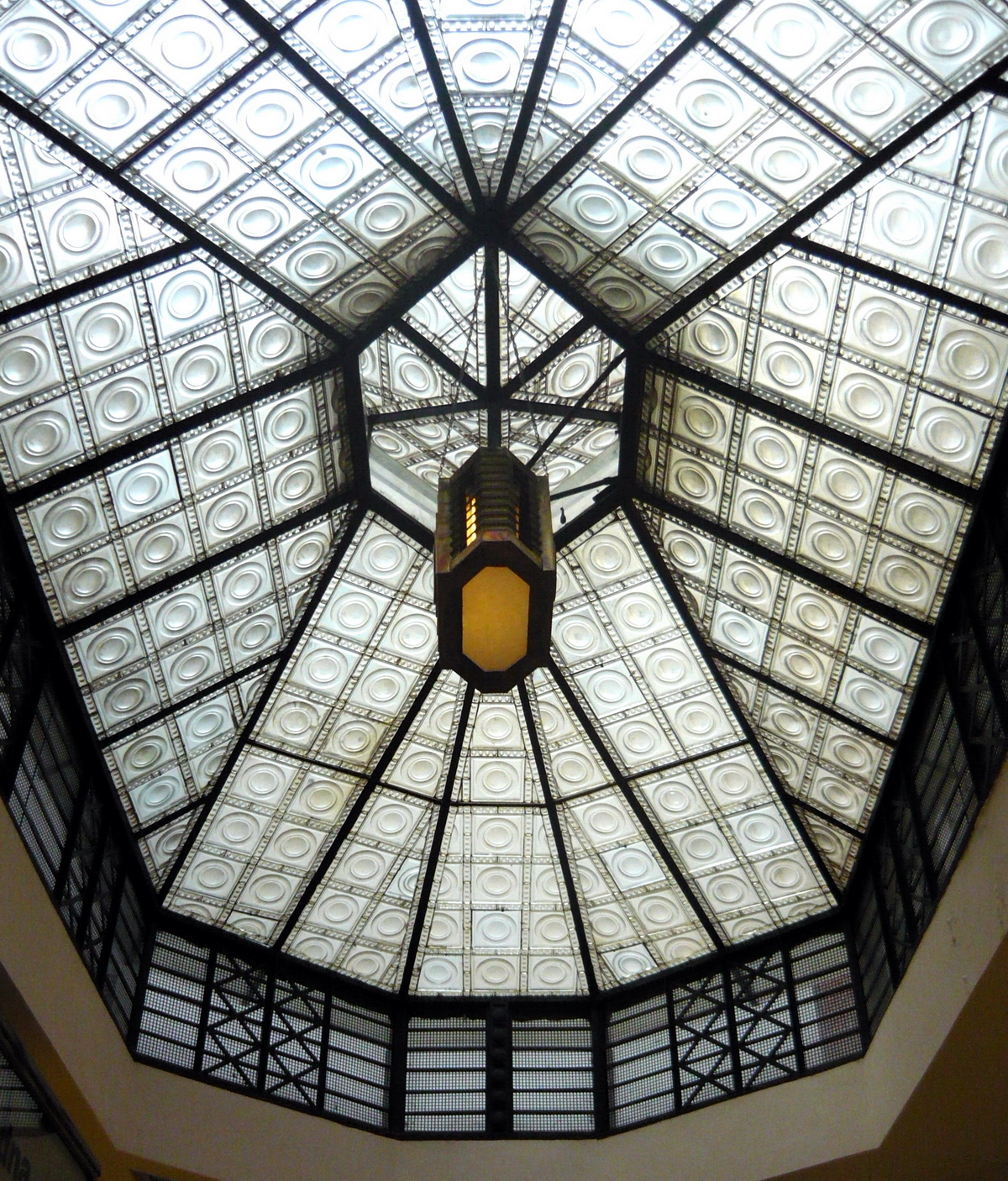
Šupich houses, Prague, 1911-1919, roof of the arcade

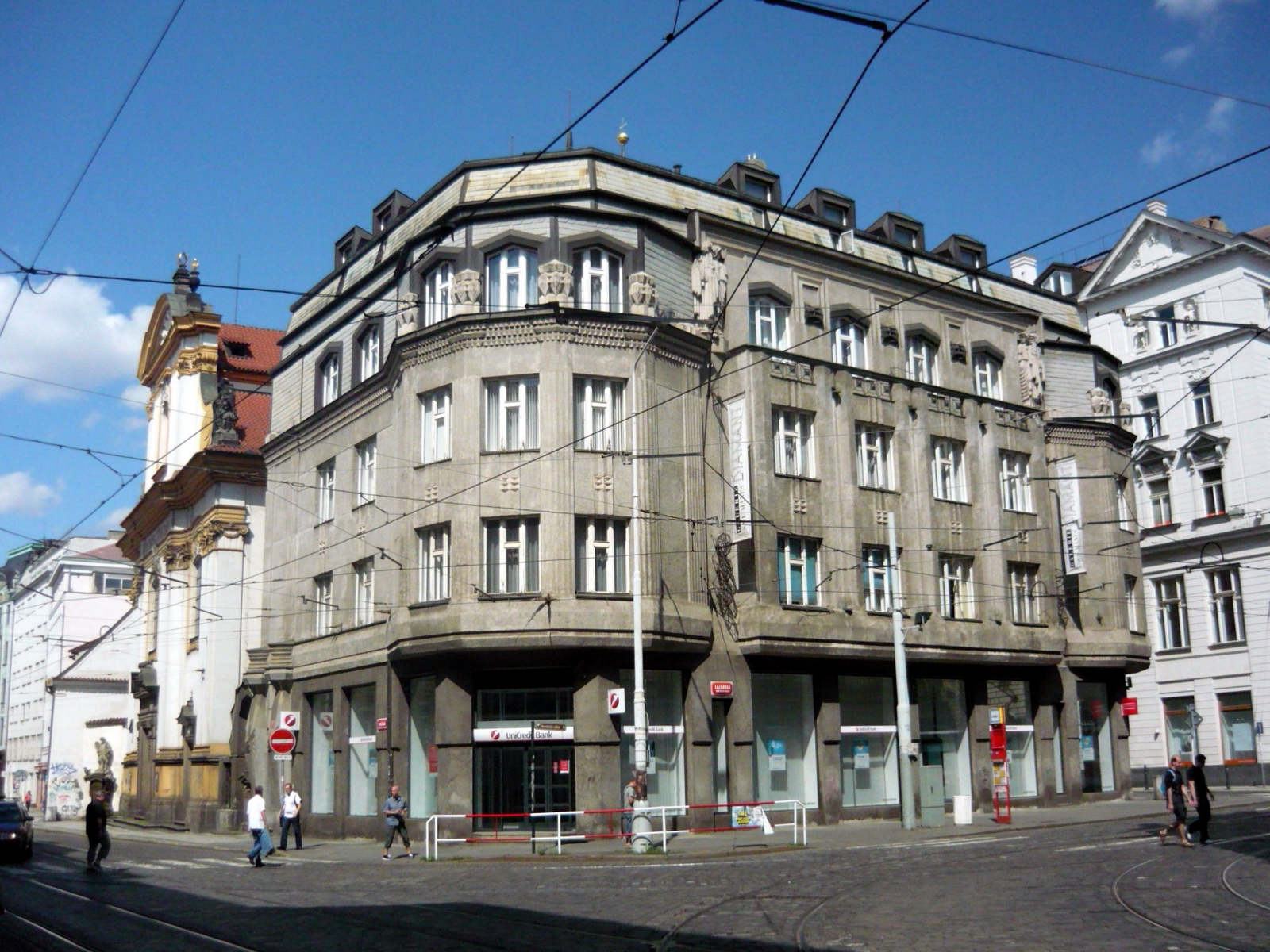
Diamant house, Prague, 1912-1913

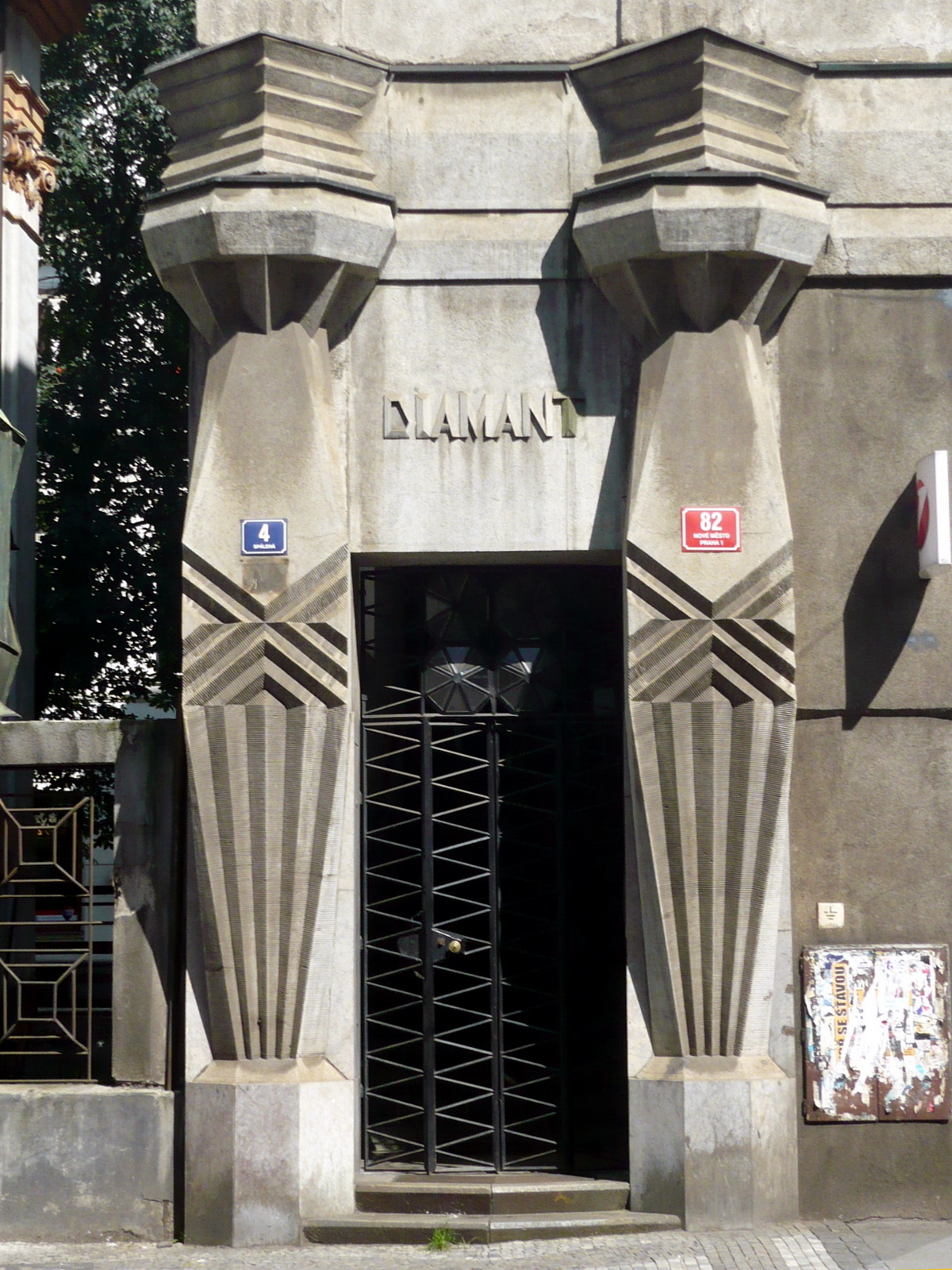
Diamant house, Prague, 1912-1913, entrance

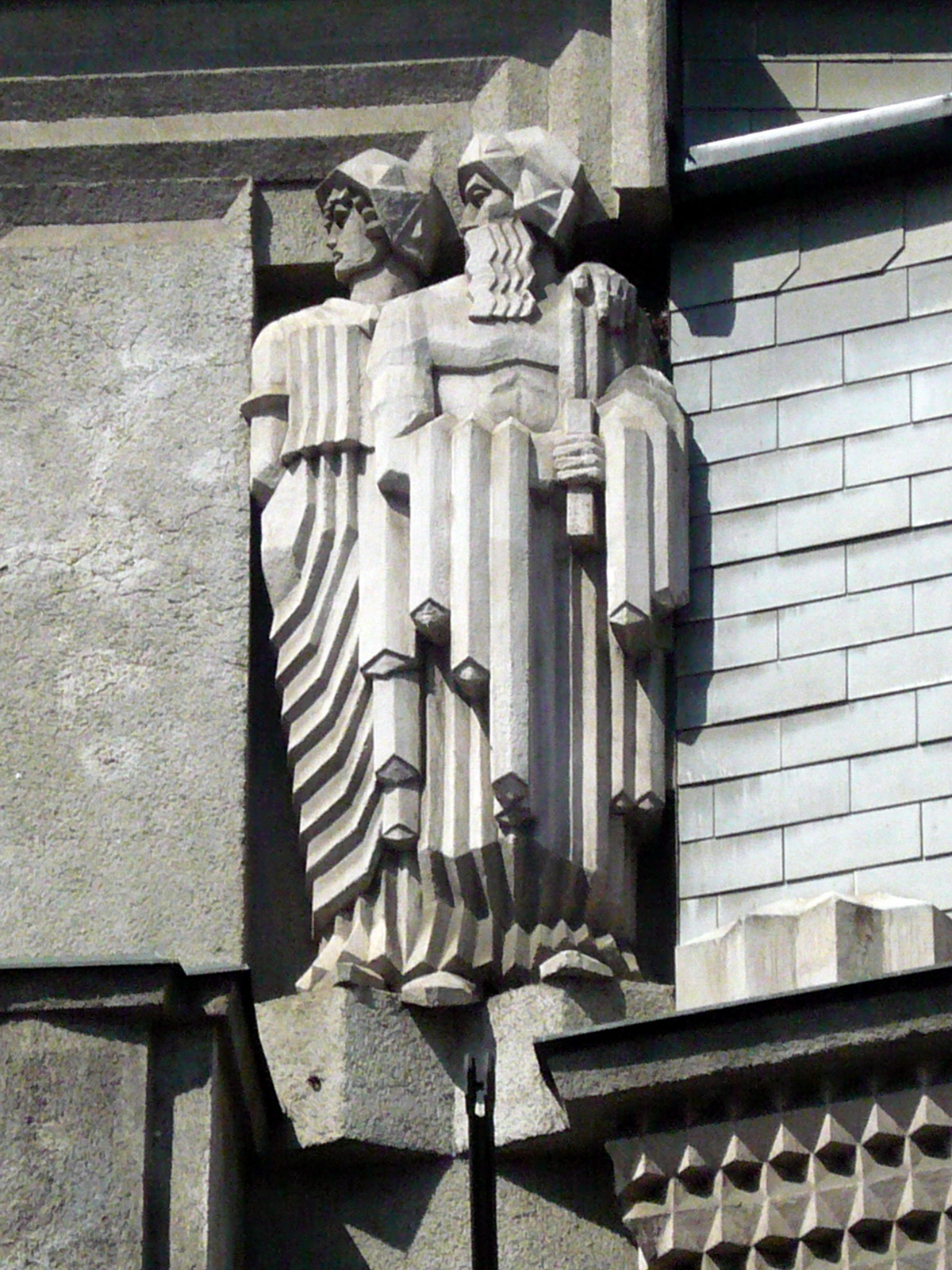
Diamant house, Prague, 1912-1913, elevation detail

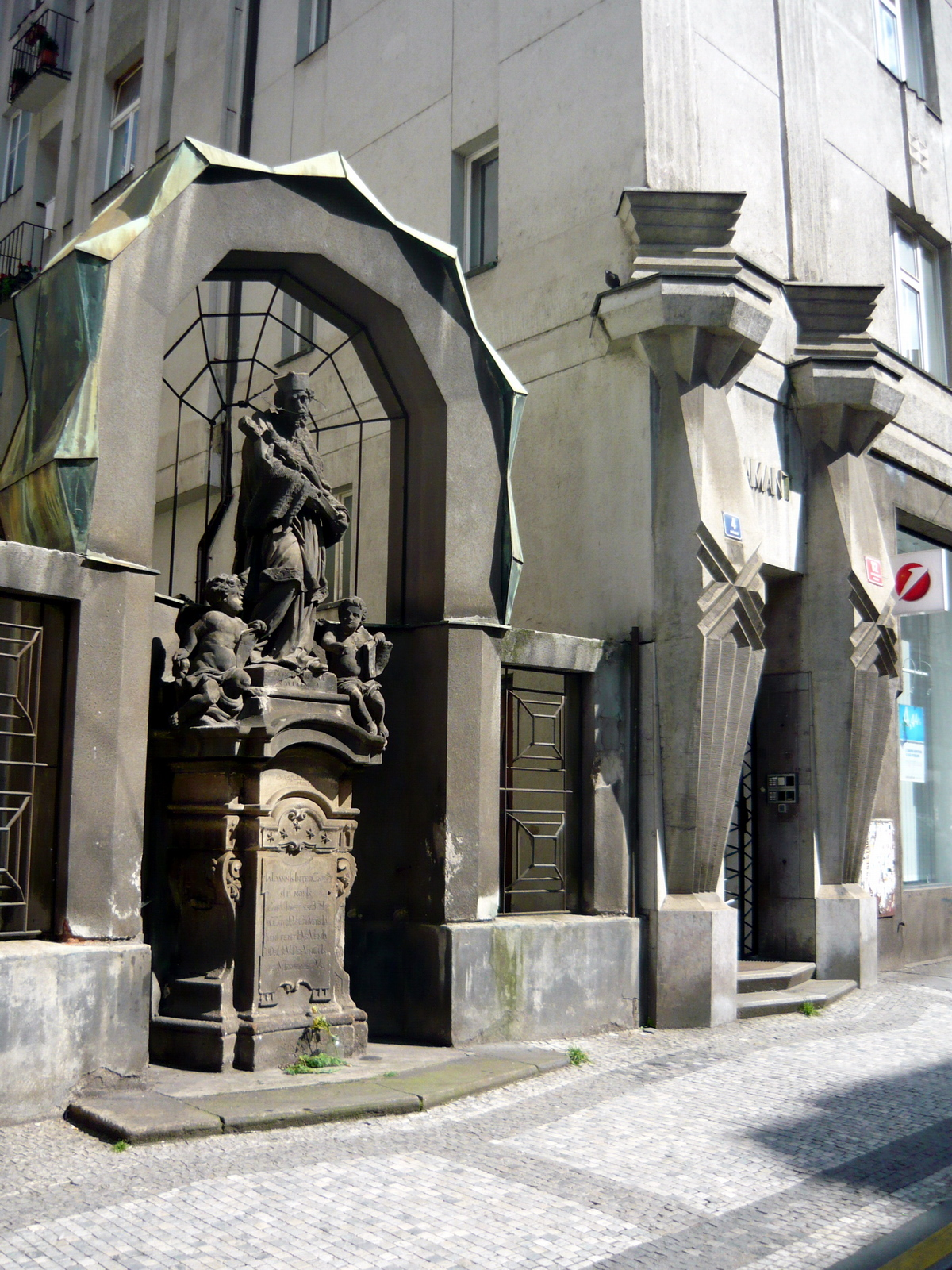
St John Arc, Prague, 1912-1913

== Sources ==
- LUKEŠ, Zdeněk. Lampa, která předběhla dobu. Lidové noviny. 10. 4. 2010, s. 31. ISSN 0862-5921.
- LUKEŠ, Zdeněk. Emil Králíček : zapomenutý mistr secese a kubismu. Praha: Galerie Jaroslava Fragnera, 2004. ISBN 80-239-3644-1. (česky, deutsch)
- KOHOUT, Michal; TEMPL, Stephan; ŠLAPETA, Vladimír. In: Praha : Architektura XX. století. Praha: Zlatý řez, 1998 (2. vydání). ISBN 80-901562-3-1.
- ŠVÁCHA, Rostislav. Od moderny k funkcionalismu: Proměny pražské architektury 1. poloviny 20. století. Praha: Victoria Publishing, 1994 (2. vydání). ISBN 80-85605-84-8.
- LUKEŠ, Zdeněk. Emil Králíček. Zlatý řez. Leden 1993, čís. 3, s. 6-11. ISSN 1210-4760.
- LUKEŠ, Zdeněk; SVOBODA, Jan E. Architekt E. Králíček - zapomenutý zjev české secese a kubismu. Umění. 1984, roč. 32, čís. 5, s. 441-449. ISSN 1804-6509. (česky, německé resumé)
