= House of the Black Madonna =

- Dům U černé Matky Boží
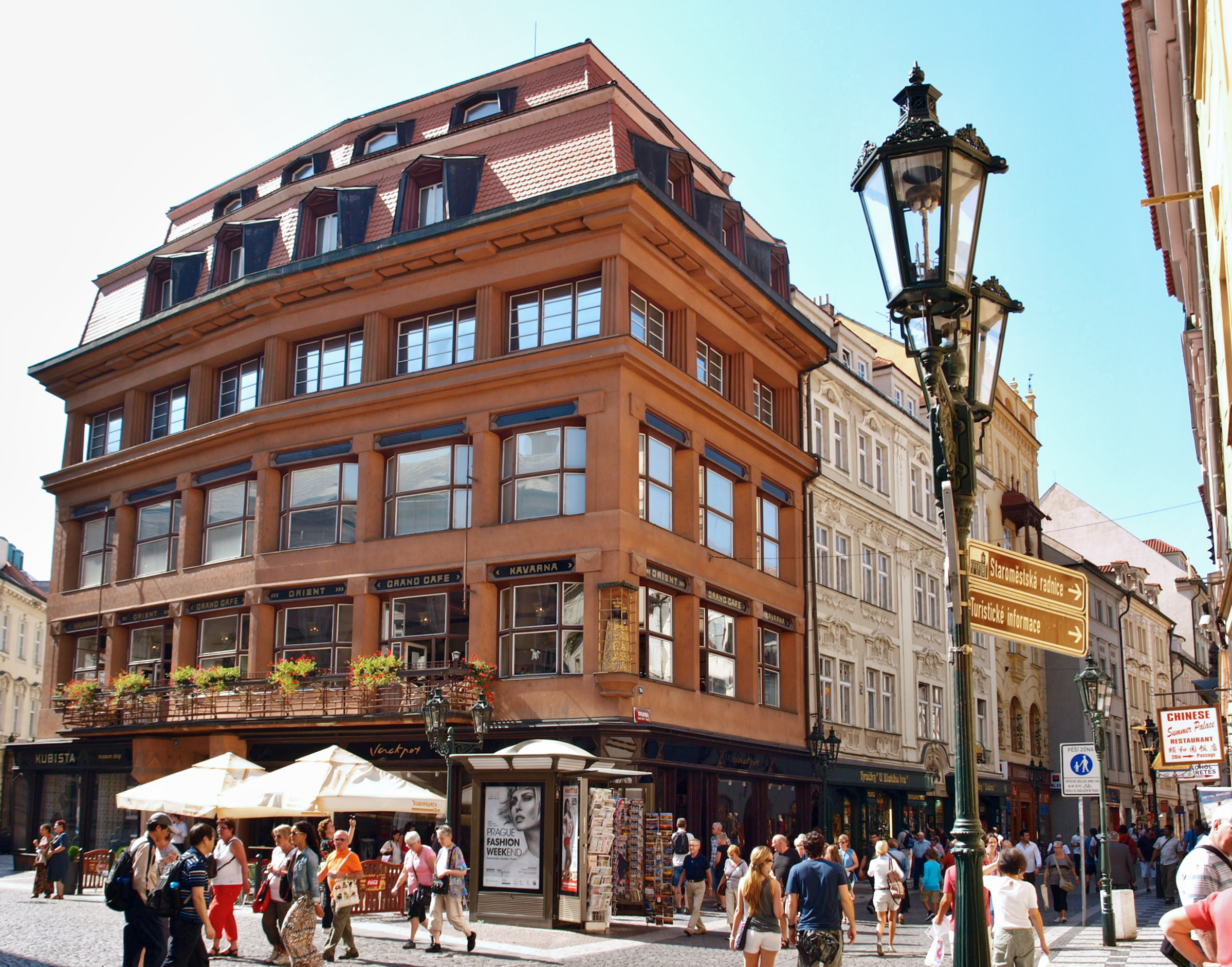

General information
- Architectural style: cubist
- Location: Old Town, Prague, Celetná 569/34, 11000, Prague 1, Czech Republic
- Coordinates: 50°5′13.39″N 14°25′30.99″E
- Completed: 1912

Design and construction
- Architect: Josef Gočár

The House of the Black Madonna (Czech: Dům U Černé Matky Boží) is a cubist building in the Old Town of Prague, Czech Republic. It was designed by Josef Gočár. The first floor houses a café, the Grand Café Orient, with a balcony which overlooks Celetná street. The four upper floors are used by the Museum of Czech Cubism.

The building, completed in 1912, is named after the baroque sculpture of a Black Madonna that adorns it, a remnant of an earlier building on the site. It is the earliest example of cubist architecture in Prague. After years of alteration and damage to the original fabric of the building, it was fully restored in 2003.

== History ==
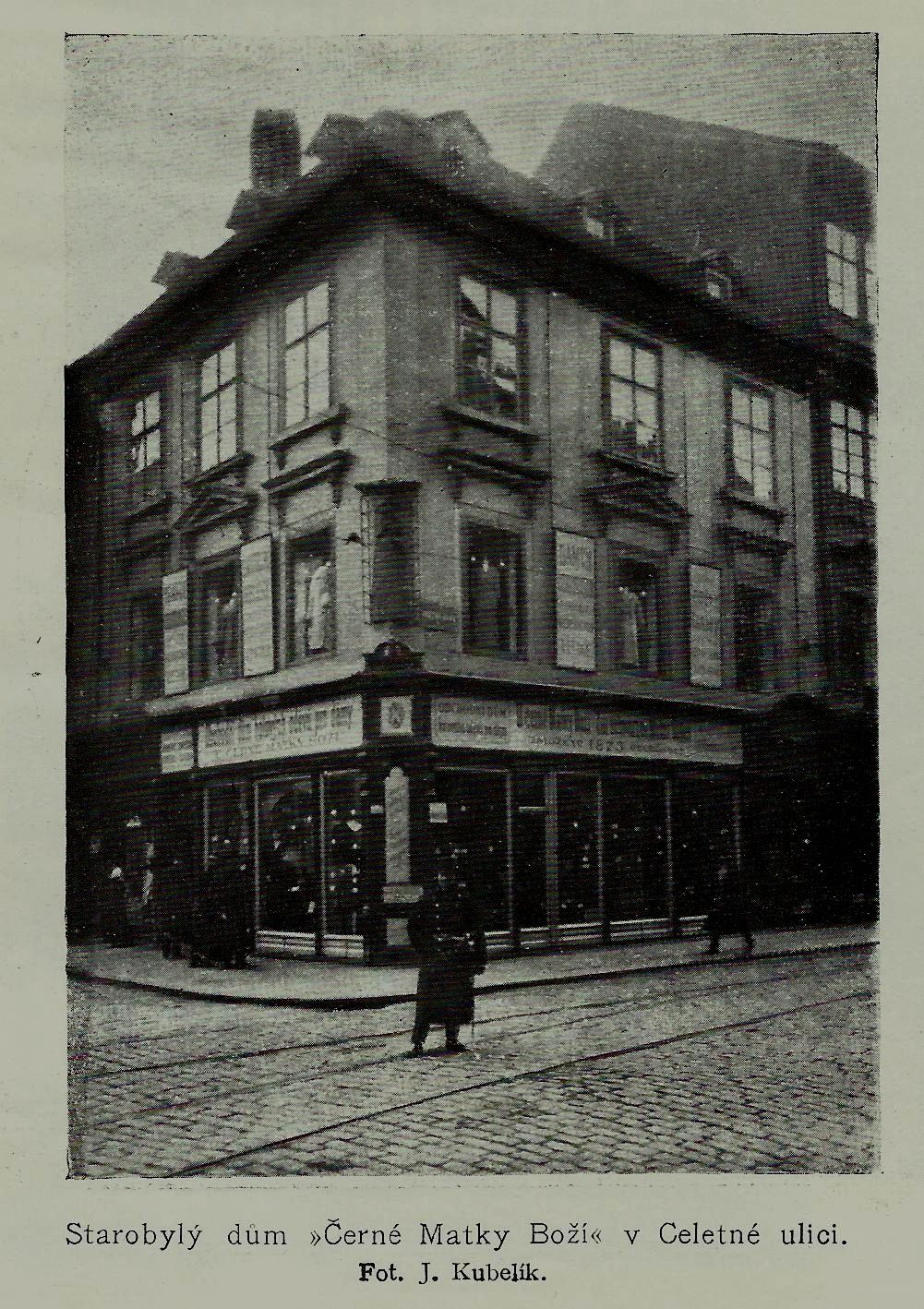
The baroque House of the Black Madonna, demolished in 1911

Gočár designed the house in mid-1911 at the age of 31 for the wholesale merchant František Josef Herbst. Herbst chose Gočár to build his department store because of the architect’s success building the modernist Wenke Department Store in Jaroměř, built from 1909-1911.

The demolition of the baroque building on the site was controversial, and Gočár’s early modernist plans for the site were not well received by the historical buildings authority. Because of its prominent location in the heart of the city, Gočár’s building was subject to strict harmonization rules requiring that the department store not conflict with its historical setting. Thus, Gočár contextualized the building in its historic surroundings through its use of baroque forms. The Prague City Council eventually approved the plans on August 4, 1911.

Like many of Gočár’s buildings, the House of the Black Madonna was built with a reinforced-concrete skeleton inspired by the Chicago School. The use of a reinforced-concrete skeleton allowed for large interior spaces without ceiling support, which was better suited to Cubist aesthetics. The first floor café, free of interior pillars, was a feat of engineering at the time.

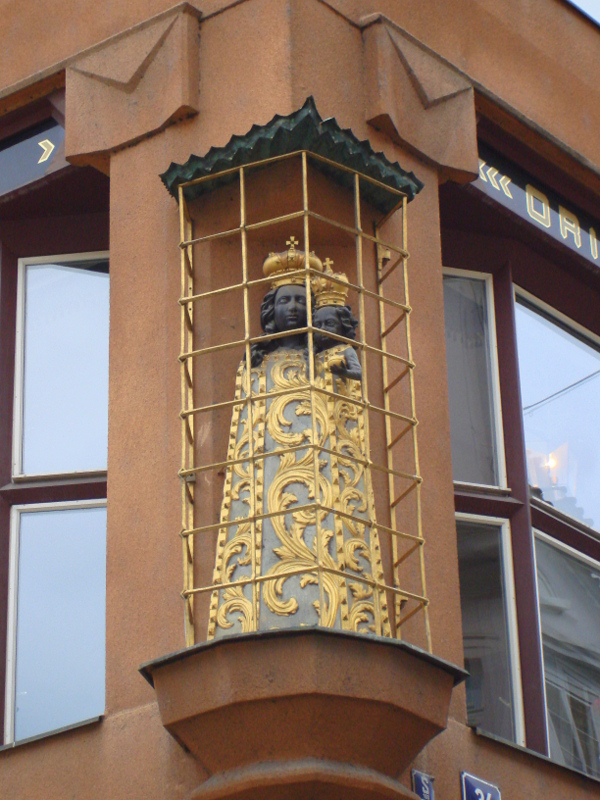
Figure of the Black Madonna, reconstructed in 2000

Herbst’s department store and the attached café occupied the ground and second floor of the building, above which were apartments. After the department store closed in 1922, the first two floors were converted to bank offices. Further alterations to the architectural integrity were made in 1941, when functionalist architect V. Kubik refashioned the wooden frames on the ground floor windows with steel. During the communist period, the building was further subdivided office space for the National Enterprise Exhibition.

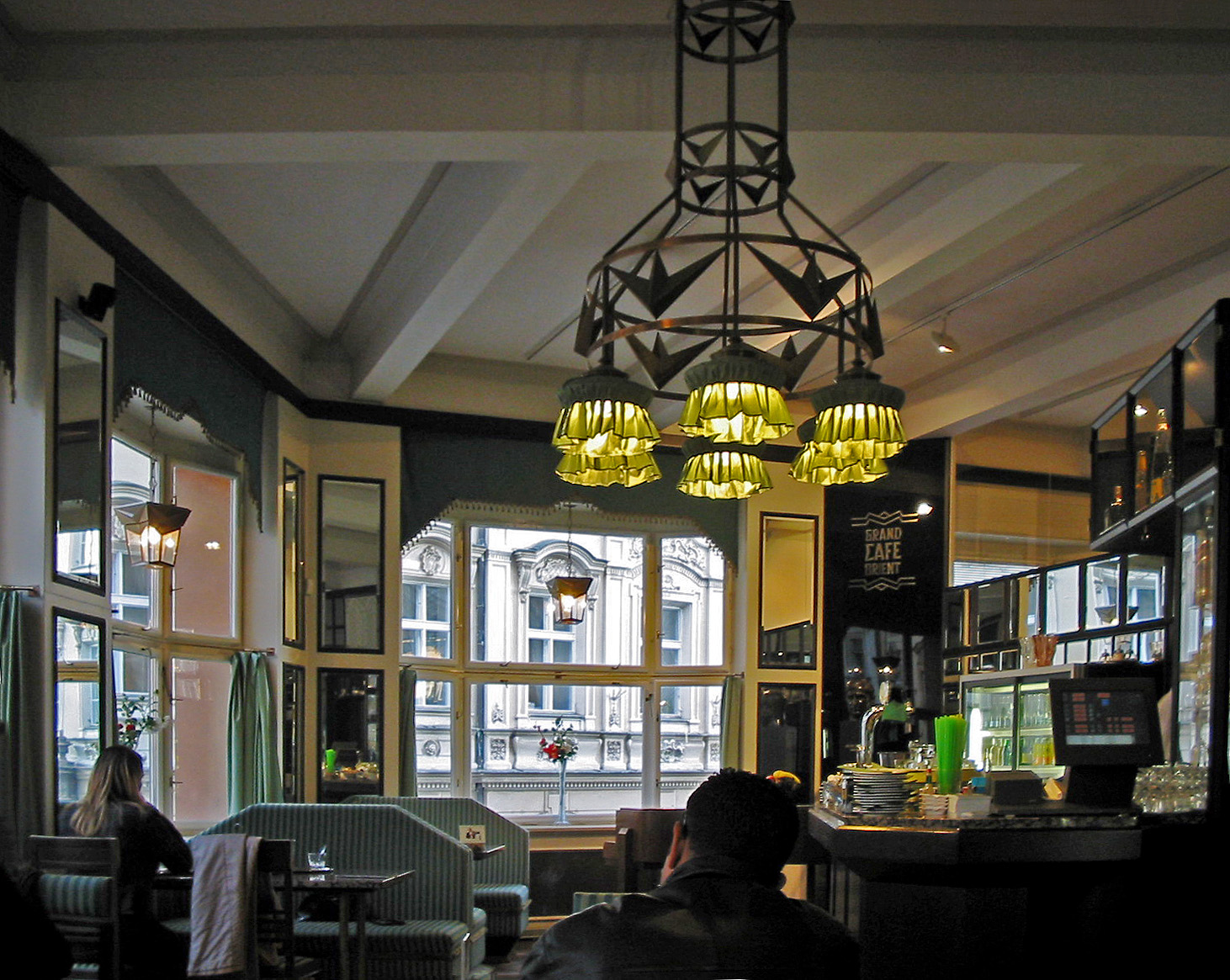
The Grand Café Orient on the first floor

In 1994, the building was thoroughly renovated and made a center for Czech art and culture. After further renovation works between 2002 and 2003, the building was made home to the Museum of Czech Cubism, operated by the Prague Museum of Decorative Arts. The second and third floors are dedicated to a permanent exhibition of Cubist art, while the upper floors are used for temporary exhibitions and workshops. Although few original plans had survived, black-and-white photographs documenting the café's interior décor from 1912 were used during renovation. Replicas of café furniture and brass chandeliers were constructed to revive the café and showcase Czech cubism to customers.
