= Churches in Prague =

This article lists actually existing churches in Prague of some historical or artistic value. The first part contains churches in the historical city centre (Hradčany, Malá Strana, Old Town, New Town and Vyšehrad), the second churches in the outer districts (Prague 3 to Prague 10).

== Comments ==
- Church - short name, patrocinium etc.
- Confession (use) - confession or another use. Brackets indicate, there are no regular services, the building is not regularly accessible.
- Established - date of original creation of the existing building and of substantial reconstruction(s). A „+“ means after, a „-„ means before.
- Style - the prevailing style(s) of the present building.
- Architect - a choice, often merely architects of the reconstructions.

== Churches in the historical city centre ==
Church	Quarter, street	Confession (other use)	Est.	Style	Architect	Map
St Vitus	Prague Castle; 3rd court	R. catholic	1344; 1929	Gothic; Neogot.	Mathieu d‘Arras; Peter Parler; Josef Mocker	"
St. George	Prague Castle; 3rd court	R. catholic	1142+ 1670+	Roman. Baroque		"
Strahov Monastery; Strahov	Hradčany; Strahovské nádv.	R. catholic	1142; 1751	Roman. Baroque	A. Lurago?	"
Birth of the Lord; Loreta	Hradčany; Loretánské nám.	R. catholic	1626; 1737	Baroque	G. B. Orsi; Ch. Dientzenhofer	"
St. John Nepomucene	Hradčany; U kasáren	R. catholic	1720	Baroque	K. I. Dientzenhofer	"
All Saints	Prague Castle; 3rd court	R. catholic	1370; 1581	Gothic	Petr Parler	"
St. Benedictus (barnabitky)	Hradčany; Hradčanské nám.	R. catholic	1353; 1627+	Baroque		"
Holy Cross	Prague Castle; 2nd court	Museum	1753	Baroque	A. Lurago	"
St. Rochus	Hradčany; Strahovské nádvoří	(Exhibitions)	1603	Gothic		"
St. Mary of the Angels (Capuchines)	Hradčany; Kapucínská	R. catholic	about 1600			"
St. Nicholas Church (Malá Strana)	Malá Strana; Malostranské nám.	R. catholic	1673; 1751	Baroque	G. D. Orsi; K. I. Dientzenhofer	"
St. John Bapt. Na Prádle	Malá Strana; Říční	Hussite	about 1240	Roman.		"
St. Joseph	Malá Strana; Josefská	R. catholic	1687	Baroque	A. Paris	"
St. Mary under the Chain	Malá Strana; Lázeňská	R. catholic	1180; 1648	Gothic; Baroque	C. Lurago	"
St. Mara and St. Caietan (Theatines)	Malá Strana; Nerudova	R. catholic	1691	Baroque	J. B. Mathey ?	"
Our Lady Victorious; Infant Jesus of Prague	Malá Strana; Karmelitská	R. catholic	1611; 1644	Baroque	G. M. Filippi	"
St. Thomas	Malá Strana; Letenská	R. catholic	1315; 1584; 1727	Gothic; Baroque	B. di Alberto; K. I. Dientzenhofer	"
St. Lawrence (Petřín)	Malá Strana; Petřín	Old Cath.	1271- 1739	Roman. Baroque	I. Palliardi	"
St. Laurentius (abolished)	Malá Strana; Hellichova	(Concert hall)	1270; 1816	Gothic		"
Our Lady before Týn; Týnský chrám	Old Town; Staroměstské nám.	R. catholic	1350+	Gothic		"
St. Francis and St. Savior; St. Agnes monastery (abolished)	Old Town; Anežská	Gallery	1233+	Gothic		"
St. Ann (abolished)	Old Town; Liliová	(Culture)	about 1350	Gothic		"
St. Bartholomew	Old Town; Bartolomějská	R. catholic	1726	Baroque	K. I. Dientzenhofer	"
Bethlehem Chapel	Old Town; Betlémské nám.	ČVUT / TU Prague	1950 (1391)	replica	J. Fragner	"
Holy Spirit	Old Town; Dušní	R. catholic	about 1350	Gothic		"
St. Francis; Knights of the Cross	Old Town; Křižovnické nám.	R. catholic	1679 (1252)	Baroque	J. B. Mathey	"
St. Castulus	Old Town; Haštalské nám.	R. catholic	about 1350; 1690+	Gothic; Baroque	P. I. Bayer	"
St. Gallus (Havel)	Old Town; Havelský trh	R. catholic	1710 (about 1330)	Baroque	P. I. Bayer ?	"
St. James	Old Town; Malá Štupartská	R. catholic	1700	Baroque	J. Š. Pánek	"
St. Aegidius; Dominicans	Old Town; Husova	R. catholic	1310; 1730+	Gothic; Baroque		"
St. Clemens (East Cath.)	Old Town; Karlova	East Cath.	1711	Baroque	F. M. Kaňka	"
Holy Cross; Rotond	Old Town; Karoliny Světlé	CČH	about 1170	Roman.		"
St. Martin in the Wall	Old Town; Martinská	ČCE / Czech Brethren	1187- 1480; 1906	Roman. Gothic	K. Hilbert	"
St. Michael (abolished)	Old Town; Michalská	Comercial	1350+ about 1750	Gothic; Baroque		"
St. Nicholas Church (Staré Město)	Old Town; Staroměstské nám.	CČH	1732	Baroque	K. I. Dientzenhofer	"
St. Savior (Czech Brethren)	Old Town; Salvátorská	ČCE	1611	Baroque	G. M. Filippi ?	"
St. Savior (catholic)	Old Town; Křižovnické nám.	R. catholic	1578; 1650	renes. Baroque	M. Fontana; C. Lurago	"
St. Simon and Juda (Hospitallers)	Old Town; U Milosrdných	(Concert hall)	1630	Baroque		"
St. Apollinaris	New Town; Apolinářská	R. catholic	about 1360	Gothic		"
Ss. Cyril and Methodius	New Town; Resslova	Orthodox	1730	Baroque	K. I. Dientzenhofer; P. I. Bayer	"
St. Ignace (Jesuite)	New Town; Karlovo nám.	R. catholic	1685	Baroque	C. Lurago	"
St. John of Nepomuk; On the Rock	New Town; Vyšehradská	R. catholic	1730	Baroque	K. I. Dientzenhofer	"
St. Henry	New Town; Jindřišská	R. catholic	about 1370; 1892	Gothic		"
St. Joseph	New Town; Nám. Republiky	R. catholic	1638	Baroque	M. Meer	"
St. Charles; Karlov	New Town; Horská	R. catholic	1351; 1575; 1704	Gothic; Baroque	B. Wolmut; J. B. Santini (?)	"
St. Catharine (abolished)	New Town; Kateřinská	(Concert hall)	1355; 1737	Gothic; Baroque	K. I. Dientzenhofer	"
St. Clemens Na Poříčí	New Town; Klimentská	ČCE	about 1400; 1892	Gothic	J. Blecha	"
Holy Cross	New Town; Na Příkopě	R. catholic	1819	Empire	J. Fischer	"
St. Longinus Rotond	New Town; Štěpánská	(R. catholic)	about 1130 about 1380	Roman.		"
Our Lady of the Pains; Alzbetinky	New Town; Na Slupi	R. catholic	1724	Baroque	K. I. Dientzenhofer	"
St. Mary on the Snow	New Town; Jungmannovo nám.	R. catholic	1347; 1603	Gothic		"
Our Lady in Emmaus; Emmaus Monastery, Na Slovanech	New Town; Vyšehradská	R. catholic	1348; 1640; 1880; 1964	Gothic	F. M. Černý	"
St. Mary on the Grass; Na Trávníčku	New Town; Na Slupi	Orthodox	1360+ 1490+	Gothic		"
St. Michael V Jirchářích	New Town; V Jirchářích	Lutheran	about 1370; 1511; 1914	Gothic		"
St. Peter; Na Poříčí	New Town; Biskupská	R. catholic	about 1150; 1382; 1874	Gothic	J. Mocker	"
St. Stephen	New Town; Štěpánská	R. catholic	1351; 1874	Gothic	J. Mocker	"
Holy Trinity	New Town; Spálená	R. catholic	1708	Baroque	O. Broggio; K. I. Dientzenhofer	"
Holy Trinity; Podskalí	New Town; Trojická	R. catholic	1358- 1728	Baroque	P. I. Bayer	"
St. Wenceslas; Na Zderaze	New Town; Resslova	ČCH	about 1270; 1380- 1909	Gothic	J. Fanta; A. Wiehl	"
St. Adalbert	New Town; Vojtěšská	R. catholic	1250+ about 1390; 1671	Baroque		"
St. Ursula	New Town; Národní tř.	R. catholic	1699	Baroque	M. Canevalle	"
St. Martin	Vyšehrad, U rotundy	(R. catholic)	about 1070; 1878	Roman.		"
Ss. Peter and Paul	Vyšehrad, Štulcova	R. catholic	1369+ 1880	Gothic; Neogot.	J. Mocker	"

Selection and source: P. Vlček a kol., Umělecké památky Prahy I.–IV.

== Churches in the outer districts ==
Church	Quarter, street	Confession (other use)	Est.	Style	Architect	Map
Church of St. Ludmila	2, Vinohrady; Nám. Míru	R. catholic	1888	Neogot.	J. Mocker	"
St. Ann	3, Žižkov; Ostromečská	(R. catholic)	1911	Art Nouveau	E. Sochor	"
Our Lady	3, Žižkov; Olšany	(Orthodox)	1924		V. Brandt	"
Holy Cross	3, Žižkov; Táboritská	R. catholic	1717	Baroque		"
St. Procopius	3, Žižkov	R. catholic	1898	Neogot.	J. Mocker	"
St. Rochus Olšany cemetery	3, Žižkov; Olšany	R. catholic	1682	Baroque	J. B. Mathey	"
Church of the Most Sacred Heart of Our Lord	3, Vinohrady; Nám. krále Jiřího	R. catholic	1928	Neoclassic	Jože Plečnik	"
St. Wenceslas Church (Vršovice)	10, Vršovice nám. Svatopluka Čecha 1348/3	R. catholic	1930	Constructivist	Josef Gočár	
Bohemian Brethren Braník	4, Braník	ČCE		Functional.		"
Center Mother Theresa	4, Chodov U modré školy	R. catholic	2005	Functional.	V. Rothbauerová	"
Milíč of Kroměříž	4, Chodov, Donovalská 53	ČCE	2002	Functional.	J. Veselý	"
St. Agnes	4, Spořilov Hlavní	R. catholic	1935	Functional.	N. Paškovský; S. Režný	"
St. Francis of Assisi	4, Krč U Habrovky	R. catholic	1941	Functional.	K. Hruška	"
St. James.	4, Kunratice	R. catholic	cca 1300; 1730	Baroque		"
St. Michael	4, Podolí	R. catholic	1222	Roman. Gothic		"
Assumption	4, Modřany; K dolům	R. catholic	1329- 1754	Baroque		"
St. Mary of Peace	4, Lhotka	R. catholic	1937	Functional.		"
St. Pancrace	4, Pankrác	R. catholic		Roman. Baroque		"
St. Procopius	4, Hrnčíře	R. catholic	about 1300 um 1700			"
Hus‘ House	5, Smíchov U Santošky	CČH	1933	Functional.		"
Hus‘ House	5, Zbraslav	CČH	1939			"
St. Gabriel	5, Smíchov Holečkova	Museum	1888	Neorom.		"
St. James	5, Zbraslav	R. catholic	1410- 1650	Gothic; Baroque		"
St. John and Paul	5, Krteň	R. catholic	about 1230; 1732; 1890	Roman.		"
St. John Nepomucene	5, Chuchelský háj	R. catholic		Baroque		"
St. John Nepomucene	5, Košíře	R. catholic	1938	Functional.	J. Čermák	"
St. Michael (Carpathian)	5, Petřín, Kinského zahrada	(Orthod.)				"
St. Mary Birth	5, Malá Chuchle	R. catholic		Baroque		"
St. Peter and Paul	5, Radotín	R. catholic	1350- 1726	Gothic; Baroque		"
Center St. Procopius	5, Jinonice Sluneční nám.	R. catholic	1999	Fukntional.	Z. Jiran	"
Holy Trinity	5, Košíře	R. catholic	1831	Klassiz.		"
St. Wenceslas	5, Smíchov Štefánikova	R. catholic	1881	Neorenaiss.	V. Barvitius	"
St. Lawrence	5, Butovice	R. catholic	1100- about 1790	Roman. Baroque		"
All Saints	5, Slivenec	R. catholic	about 1280; 1693	Gothic; Baroque		"
Bohemian Brethren Střešovice	6, Před Bateriemi	CČE	1939	Functional.	B. Kozák	"
St. Fabian and Sebastian	6, Liboc	R. catholic	1842	Classicist	K. Brusta	"
St. Gotthard	6, Bubeneč Krupkovo nám.	R. catholic	1801	Classicist	M. Šmaha	"
St. Martin	6, Řepy K mostku	R. catholic	about 1150; 1225 um 1770	Roman. Baroque		"
Our Lady Victorious	6, Bílá Hora	R. catholic	1622	Baroque		"
St. Mary Magdalene	6, Přední Kopanina	R. catholic		Roman.		"
Brevnov Monastery St. Margaret	6, Břevnov, Markétská 1	R. catholic		Baroque	K. I. Dientzenhofer	"
St. Matthew	6, Dejvice	R. catholic	1770	Baroque		"
St. Adalbert	6, Dejvice Kolejní	R. catholic	1925		F. Havel	"
St. Anthony	7, Strossmayerovo nám.	R. catholic	1908	Neogot.	F. Mikš	"
St. Clemens	7, Holešovice Kostelní	R. catholic	1230- 1659			"
Ss. Cyril and Methodius	8, Karlínské nám.	R. catholic	1854	Neorom.	V. I. Ullmann	"
Jacob's Ladder	8, U školské zahrady 1	Czech Brethren	1971	Functional.	Ernst Gisel	"
St. John Bapt.	8, Dolní Chabry	R. catholic	about 1170	Roman.		"
St. Peter and Paul	8, Bohnice	R. catholic	1158 1805	Roman. Baroque		"
St. Theresa (Salesians)	8, Kobyliské nám.	R. catholic	1936	Functional.		"
St. Wenceslas	8, Bohnice	(Hospital)	1905	Art Nouveau	V. Roštlapil	"
St. Adalbert	8, Libeň	R. catholic	1904	Art Nouveau	E. Králíček	"
St. Elisabeth	9, Kbely Železnobrodská	R. catholic		Functional.	J. Korenčík	"
St. Bartholomew	9, Kyje	R. catholic	about 1230	Roman.		"
St. George	9, Hloubětín	R. catholic	about 1257; 1695	Baroque		"
Holy Cross	9, Vinoř	R. catholic	1727	Baroque	F. M. Kaňka	"
St. Mary	9, Třeboradice	R. catholic	about 1330 um 1760	Gothic; Baroque		"
Assumption	9, Dolní Počernice	R. catholic	about 1200 1887	Roman. Baroque		"
St. Remigius	9, Čakovice	R. catholic	1735; 1895	Neorom.		"
St. Wenceslas	9, Prosek U prosec. kostela	R. catholic	about 1100 about 1470	Roman.		"
Hus‘ House	10, Vinohrady; Dykova	CČH	1930	Functional.	P. Janák	"
Hus‘ House	10, Vršovice; Moskevská	CČH.	1930	Functional.	K. Truksa; P. Janák	"
St. James	10, Petrovice	R. catholic	about 1270 1910	Gothic		"
St. John Bapt.	10, Hostivař Selská	R. catholic	about 1250	Gothic Baroque		"
St. Margaret	10, Královice	R. catholic	about 1300 1739	Gothic Baroque	T. Budil	"
St. Nicolaus	10, Vršovice	R. catholic	1374; 1668			"
Birth of Our Lady	10, Záběhlice U splavu	R. catholic	about 1125	Roman.		"
St. Andrew	10, Kolovraty Mírová	R. catholic	about 1350 1767	Gothic Baroque		"
Conception of Our Lady	10, Strašnice Ke strašnické	R. catholic	1992			"
St. Wenceslas	10, Vršovice; Čechovo nám	R. catholic	1929	Functional.	J. Gočár	"
All Saints	10, Uhříněves	R. catholic	1740		J. J. Halířek	"

== Literature ==
- E. Poche a kol., Umělecké památky Čech 1.-4. Praha 1977n.
- P. Vlček a kol., Umělecké památky Prahy I./IV. Praha 1999n.
