= Hus' House (Vršovice) =

- Husův sbor
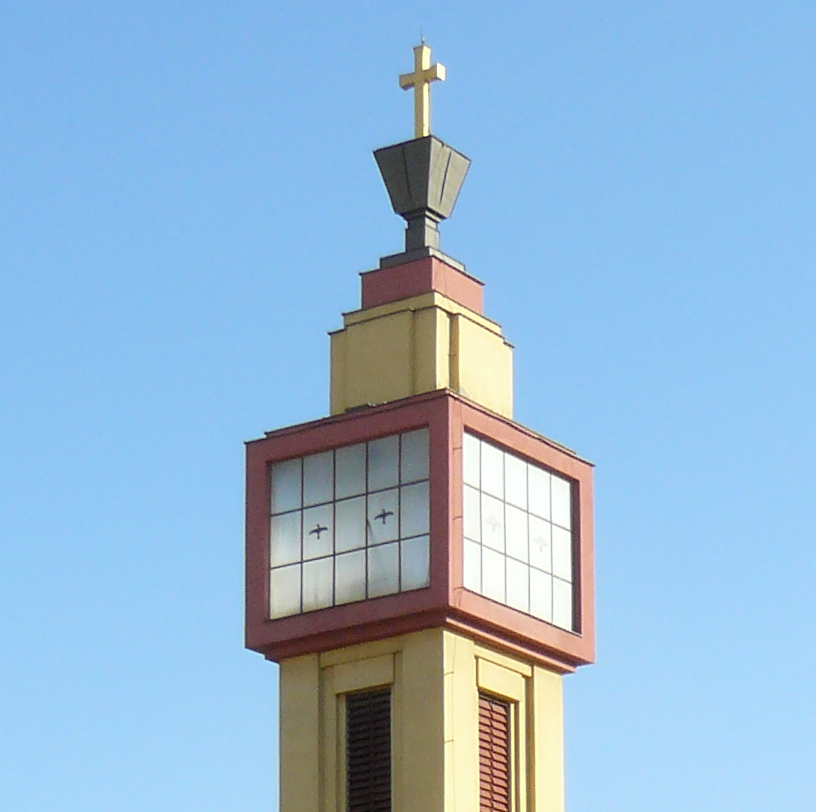
- The "lighthouse"
- Hus' House
- 50.0681°N 14.458°E
- Location: 34 v Praze Vršovicích, Prague
- Country: Czech Republic
- Denomination: Hussite Church
- Website: www.husuvsbor.cz

History
- Status: Active
- Dedicated: December 21, 1930

Architecture
- Architect(s): Karel Truksa, Pavel Janák
- Style: Constructivism
- Years built: 1930

Administration
- Diocese: Prague
- Parish: Prague 10-Vršovice

The Hus' House or Husův sbor is a Hussite church in the Vršovice area of Prague. This building was one of the first buildings in Prague built from pre-stressed concrete and brick panels. It was built in less than a year and includes a "lighthouse" tower topped with symbol of Hussite church, a chalice and a cross.

== History ==
The Hus' House was built in 1930 using the novel material of pre-stressed concrete. The beginning of that build began with the formation of a committee in 1921 to create this church. The land for the building had previously been used for a coaching inn and a blacksmith. The emerging local Hussite group received national recognition in 1923 and their work led to the appointment of Karel Truksta. Truksta was an architect trained in Prague and it was his role to not only make the design but also the specification for builders to quote for the work.

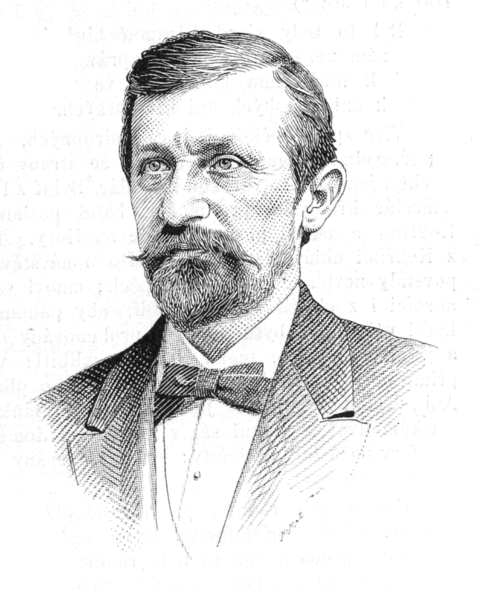
Vaclav Nekvasil built the church in less than a year

An unusual foundation stone was laid on 29 September 1929, as the stone had an association with the church reformer Jan Hus who had been burnt for his beliefs in 1415. The stone came from Kozí Hrádek castle near Sezimovo Ústí where Hus had preached of his ideas that led to the formation of the Hussite Church. The main contractor was the builder Václav Nekvasil who was told in March 1930 that they needed to complete the build that year. This was achieved on 21 December when the opening was celebrated.

The design included a theatre that seated almost 300 people with space for an orchestra, dressing rooms and make-up and offices. Other activities in the building include a film club, lectures and other cultural activities. The theatre brings in an income and the multi-function building also included accommodation for pensioners and part of the space is let to the branch of a bank. This income pays for maintaining the building and its columbarium as well as contributing to the wider aims of the church.

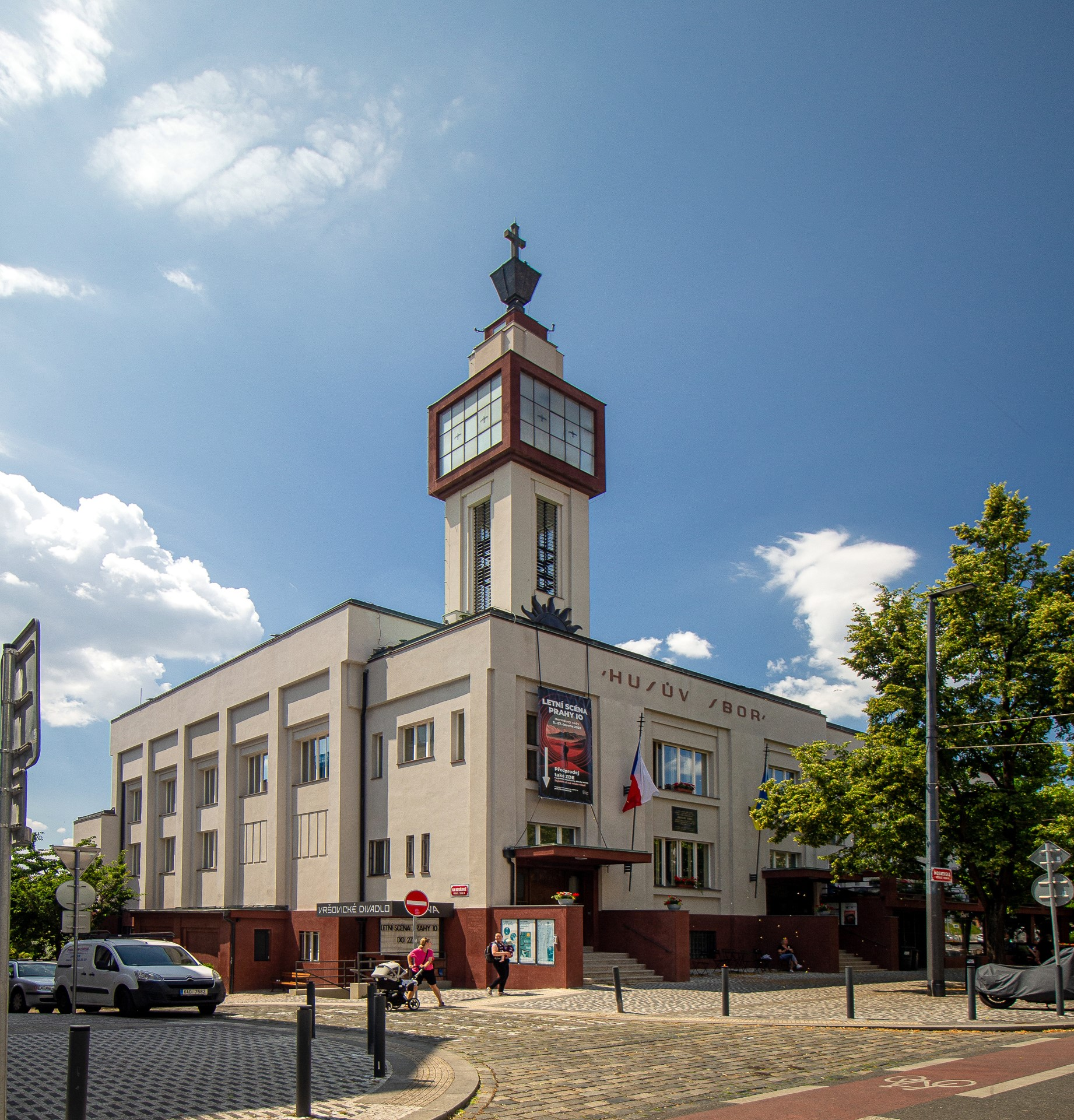
The building and tower

An Alois Jirásek Theatre was based here although Jirásek had died in 1930. The theatre group was so successful that they credit the closing of the nearby theatre in Vinohrady to their success. The company became known for plays and for opera. The theatre closed in the 1960s due to pressures from the communist authorities who were unhappy with a religious body being involved with a theatre. There have been attempts to relaunch the theatre but the city have said that a prospective company would need to find external funding.

The design of the tower was a collaboration with Pavel Janák who designed the other nearby Hussite church in Vinohrady. It is topped at 33 metres (108 ft) by a chalice which is a key symbol of the Hussite church as well as a cross. There is an extended floor near the top of the tower which is surrounded by the four large glass panels. The design for the tower has four tall thin shuttered windows. The tower was intended to be seen as a "ship's lantern" which symbolises a "lighthouse" pointing the way to eternity.
