= Hus Congregational House =

- Husův sbor
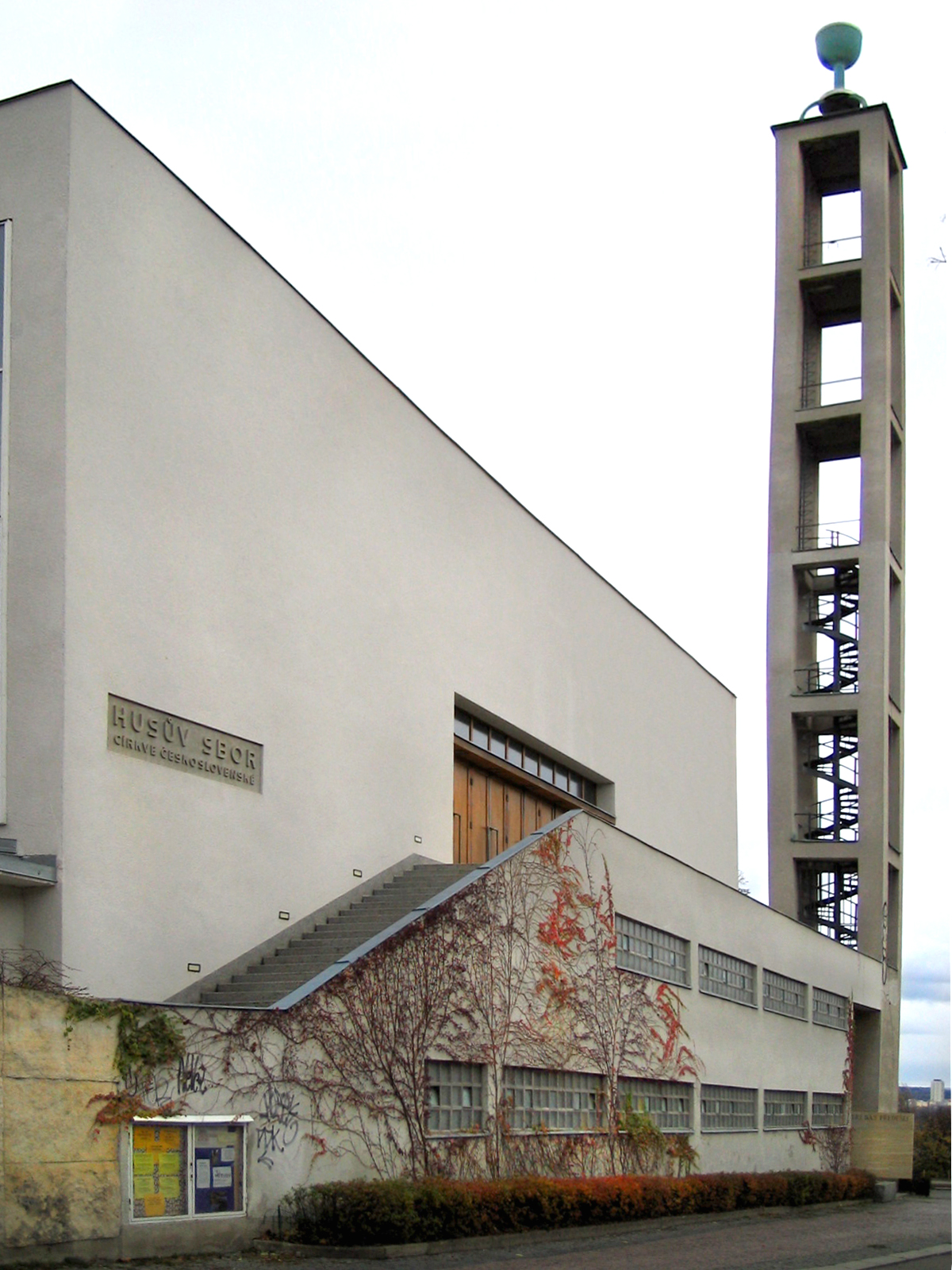
- The church and tower
- Hus Congregational House
- 50.074343°N 14.4489°E
- Location: Dykova 51/1; 101 00 Prague 10-Vinohrady
- Country: Czech Republic
- Denomination: Hussite Church
- Website: www.hs-vinohrady.cz

History
- Status: Active
- Founded: 1935

Architecture
- Architect: Pavel Janák
- Years built: 1930–1935

Administration
- Diocese: Prague
- Parish: Prague 10-Vinohrady

The Hus Congregational House, or Husův sbor, is a Hussite church in Dykova Street in Prague 10. It was completed in 1935 as part of a multi-functional development by architect Pavel Janák in the constructivist style. The tall, six-storey minimalist tower and belfry carries a 700 kg copper chalice as a symbol of the Hussite Church. The tower was briefly used to create an alternative radio station during the Prague uprising in 1945.

== History ==
The Hus Congregational House was built between 1930 and 1935 to architect Pavel Janák's constructivist design in Dykova Street in Prague 10 for a Hussite congregation. The land near the old water works had been purchased in 1925, and the Church commissioned Janák to create a novel design for the church.

Janak's first design in 1929 was accepted by the Church elders but rejected by the town planners. The following year's design included an apartment building, a theatre and a six-storey tower. By this time the symbolic foundation stone had been laid but work on the first real building did not start until 1 July 1932. Janak had previous experience of pre-stressed concrete as he had worked on the church in Vršovice, which was built in 1930. Fourteen months after this building was started the reinforced-concrete framed church held its first service and the building was delivered under budget.

The six-storey tower is just under 35 metres high and the top three floors incorporate bells. The design includes spiral staircases for the first three floors, while upper floors have ladders for access. The symbol of the Hussite Church, a copper chalice that weighs 700 kg and stands over two metres tall, was consecrated and installed on top of the tower in June 1933 in the "Celebration of the Goblet".

In 1938 the design was reworked by Jiri Jakub. He converted the space under the church that had been designed as a theatre into a columbarium where funeral urns could be stored.

The tower was used between 7 and 9 May 1945 as an impromptu radio tower during the Prague uprising, when it sheltered Czech resistance fighters who were trying to evict the occupying German forces from the city.

== Today ==
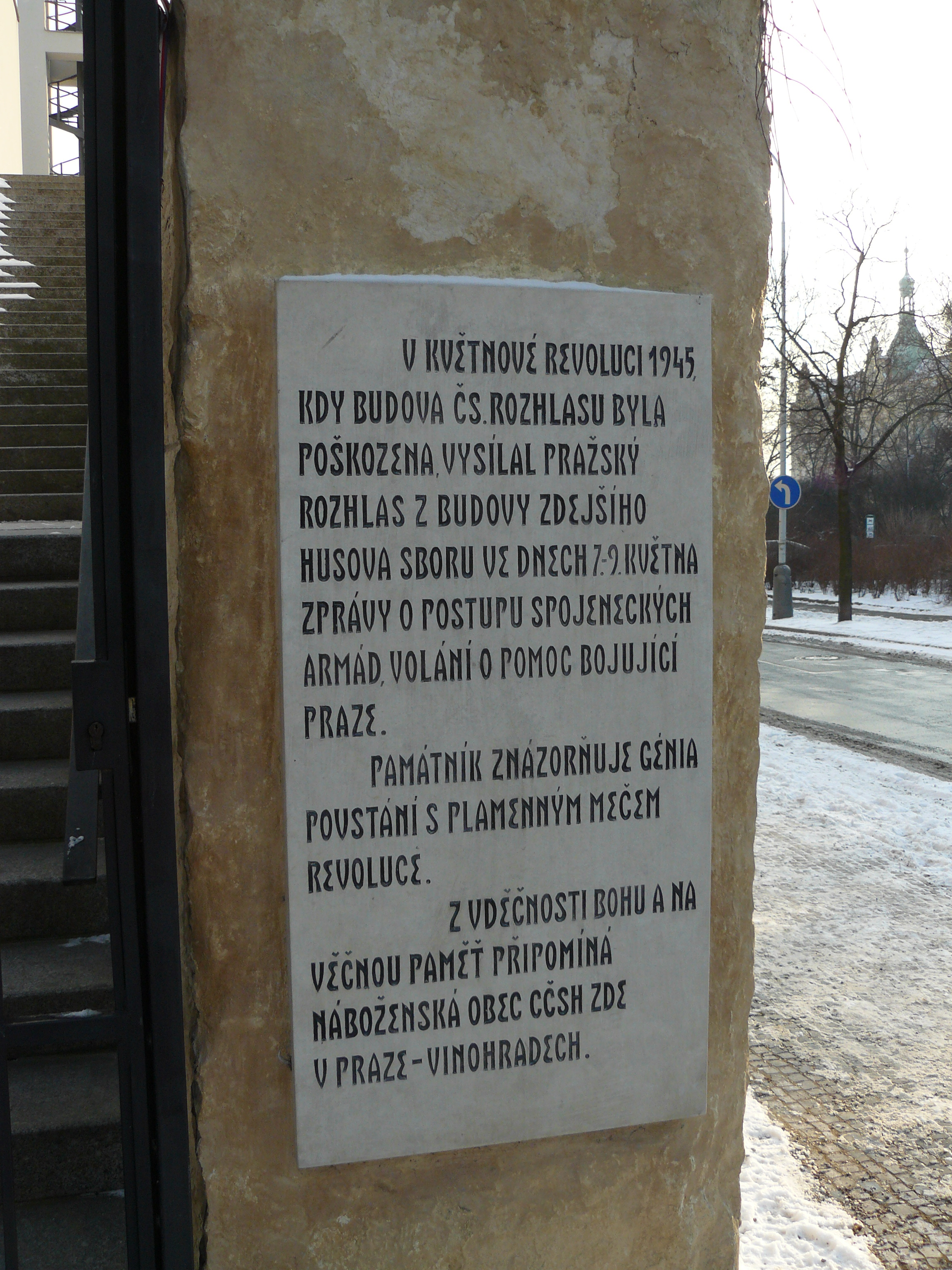
This plaque records the role of the church as a radio station during the Prague Uprising.

Inside the church is a 2.6-metre tall statue of Christ by Jan Znoj, which is surrounded by earthenware reliefs of the apostles and Czech heroes of the Reformation. The reliefs continue into the foyer, where there is also a statue of Bishop Jan Blahoslav by the sculptor František Bílek. The sculptural decorations are by Jaroslav Horejc.

The church building is used for Hussite Church services, but it is also used for language courses, lectures and public exhibitions. The space below the chapel is still used as a columbarium. The rest of the building still includes clubrooms, a residential building and offices.

The minimalist building has been described as "Protestant anti-baroque architecture in the extreme, dramatic ... but soulless".
