= De ecclesia =

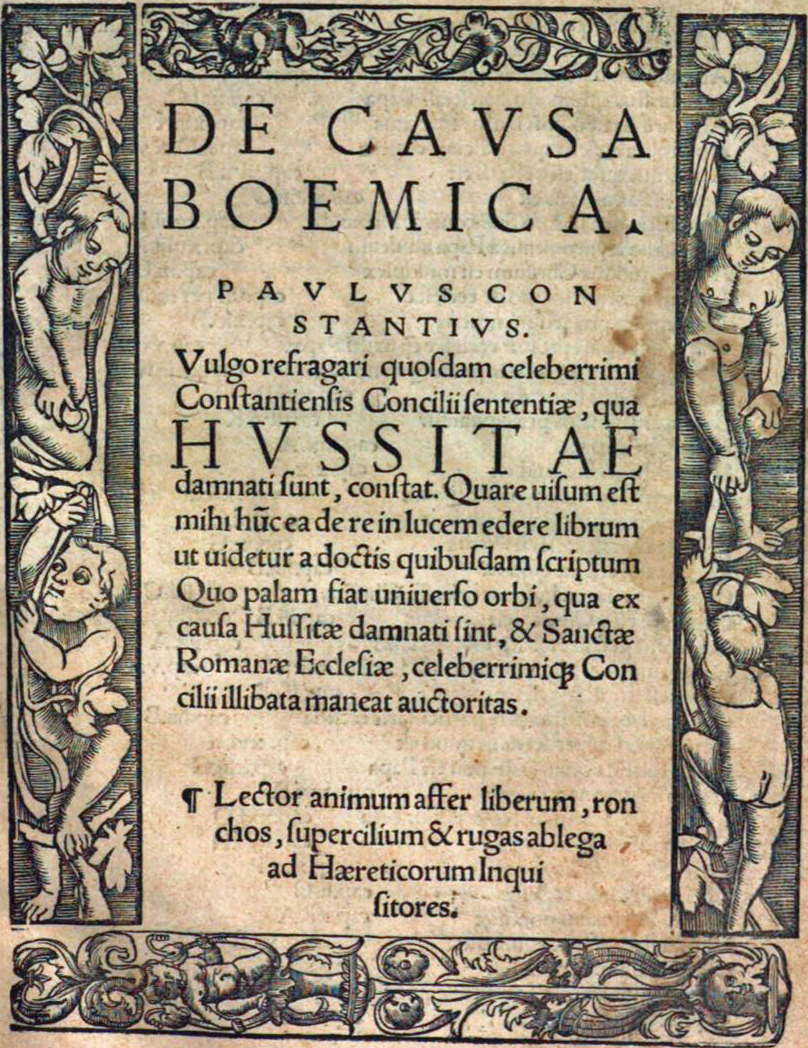
- Title page of a printed edition of De ecclesia
- Author: Jan Hus
- Language: Latin
- Subject: Theology, Ecclesiology
- Genre: Treatise
- Published: 1413

De ecclesia (On the Church) is a 1413 theological treatise by the Bohemian priest Jan Hus. Written in Latin during his exile at Kozí Hrádek castle in southern Bohemia following his excommunication, the book is considered his most significant theological work. Drawing heavily upon the teachings of the English theologian John Wycliffe, De ecclesia outlines Hus's views on ecclesiology, predestination, and papal authority. The book's premises formed the primary basis for the charges of heresy against Hus at the Council of Constance, where thirty of his propositions were formally condemned as errors by the Catholic Church.

== Structure ==
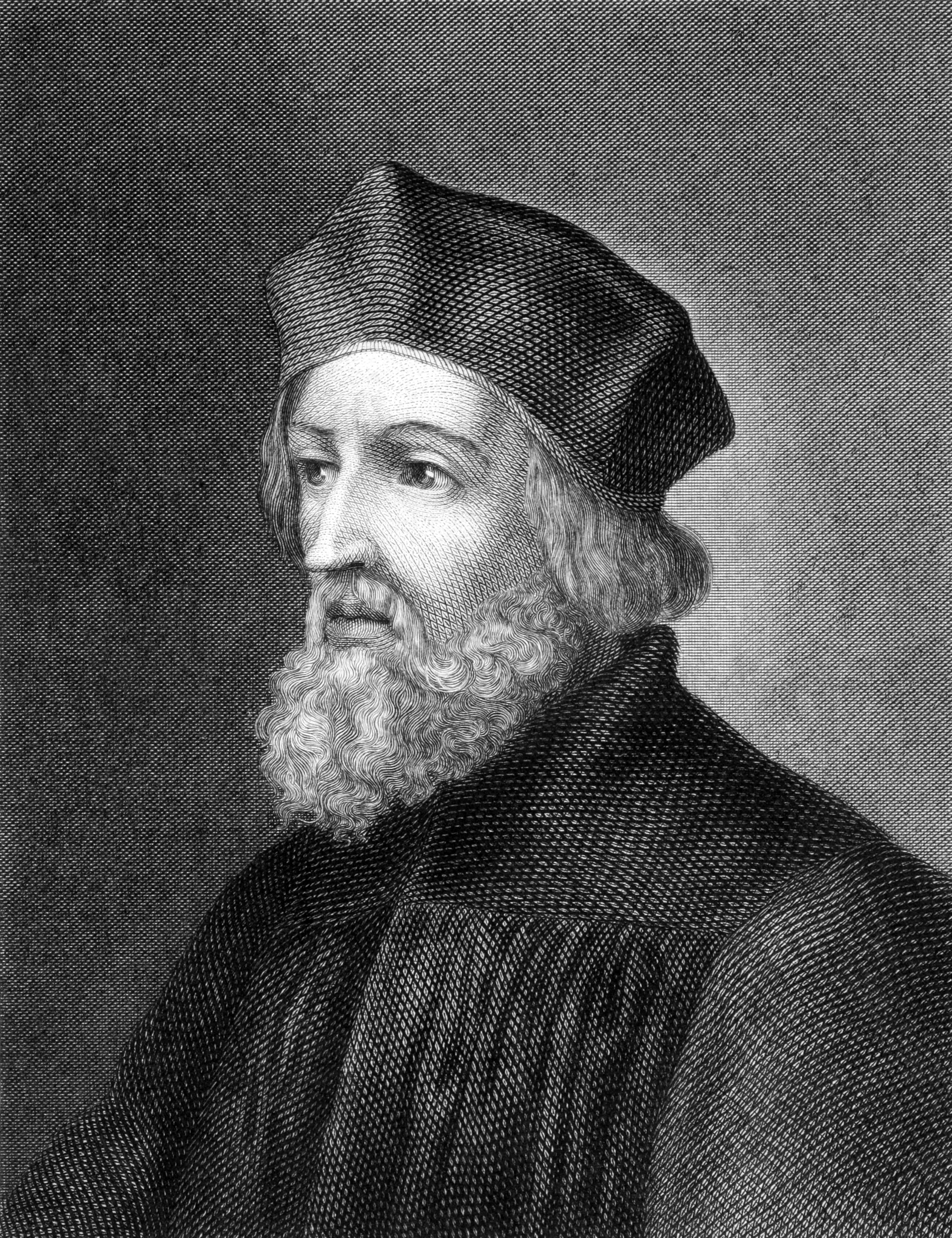
Traditional portrait of Jan Hus, the author of the work.

The work comprises 23 chapters. The first ten chapters articulate Hus's systematic understanding of the Church, particularly his view that it consists exclusively of the predestined. Chapters 11 to 23 are a polemical response to the theological faculty of Prague and a rejection of the papal bull Unam sanctam by Pope Boniface VIII. In these later chapters, Hus defends his disobedience to legitimate Church authorities, particularly Antipope Alexander V (who was recognized by many as the legitimate pope at the time), and characterizes his excommunication and the interdict imposed upon him as illegitimate.

== Themes ==
=== Predestinarianism and the nature of the church ===
A central theme of De ecclesia is its focus on predestinarianism, which contrasts with the traditional Catholic doctrine of free will and the role of the Sacraments. Hus argues that the true Church is strictly the convocation of those predestined by God to salvation. He posits a "true" Church comprising the predestined (whose head is Christ alone) and a "false" Church comprising the damned.

Consequently, Hus taught that a person foreknown to damnation is never part of the Holy Church, while a person predestined to salvation always remains a member, regardless of their sins or excommunication. Catholic theologians, including those at the Council of Constance, formally condemned this view as heretical. They maintained that Hus's position implied a person's ultimate destiny is determined by God's will alone, which they argued renders human cooperation with God's grace, personal sanctification, and the Sacraments irrelevant.

=== Denial of papal authority ===
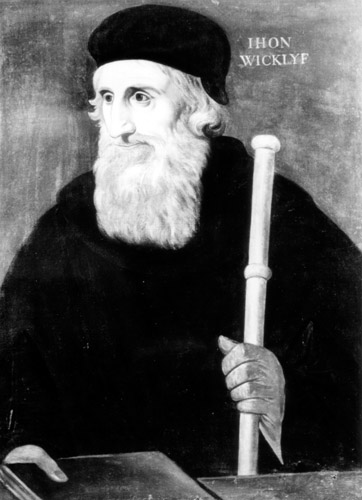
Jan Hus drew heavily upon the teachings of John Wycliffe.

In De ecclesia, Hus rejects the divine institution of the Papacy and the visible, hierarchical structure of the Church Militant. He denies that Saint Peter was or is the head of the Holy Catholic Church. Instead, he claims that the preeminence of the Bishop of Rome is merely a consequence of secular decisions, such as the Donation of Constantine, and not instituted by Christ.

He further argues that the Pope can only be considered a successor of Peter if he perfectly emulates Peter's virtues, effectively divorcing the office of the Papacy from the individual holding it. Denying the necessity of a visible head on earth, Hus writes:

Blessed also be God Almighty, who ordains that His militant church shall have such life that, when a pope is dead, she is not on that account without a head or dead! Because not upon the pope but upon the head, Christ, does her life depend.

— Jan Hus, De ecclesia

And further referencing the Western Schism:

Blessed also be the Lord, the one living head of the church, who preserves her so effectually in unity that, even now, while there are three so-called papal heads, she remains the one spouse of the Lord Jesus Christ!

— Jan Hus, De ecclesia

Because Hus's views challenged the prevailing ecclesiastical power structure, De ecclesia served as the primary basis for his condemnation at Constance.

=== "Right of resistance" ===
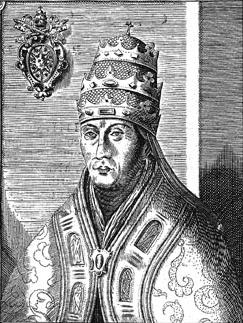
Hus specifically defended his refusal to obey the commands of Antipope Alexander V.

Hus uses De ecclesia to formulate a "right of resistance" against Church authorities, prioritizing personal interpretation over obedience. He asserts that inferiors are not obliged to obey superiors if they judge their commands to be contrary to their own understanding. Defending his own refusal to cease preaching, he writes:

Further, it is evident that if pope or other superior command the priest not to preach, who is disposed to do so (as has been said), or the rich not to give alms, the inferior ought not to obey. Wherefore, depending on this command of the Lord, I have not obeyed Pope Alexander's command in regard to not preaching and hence will humbly bear excommunication, confident that I will secure to myself the benediction of my God.

— Jan Hus, De ecclesia

He concludes that truth is revealed to "simple laymen and little priests who choose rather to obey God than men," prefiguring the Protestant doctrine of the priesthood of all believers and the rejection of a special class of clergy to mediate between God and humanity.

== Theological Perspectives and Receptions ==
=== Anglican and Protestant reception ===
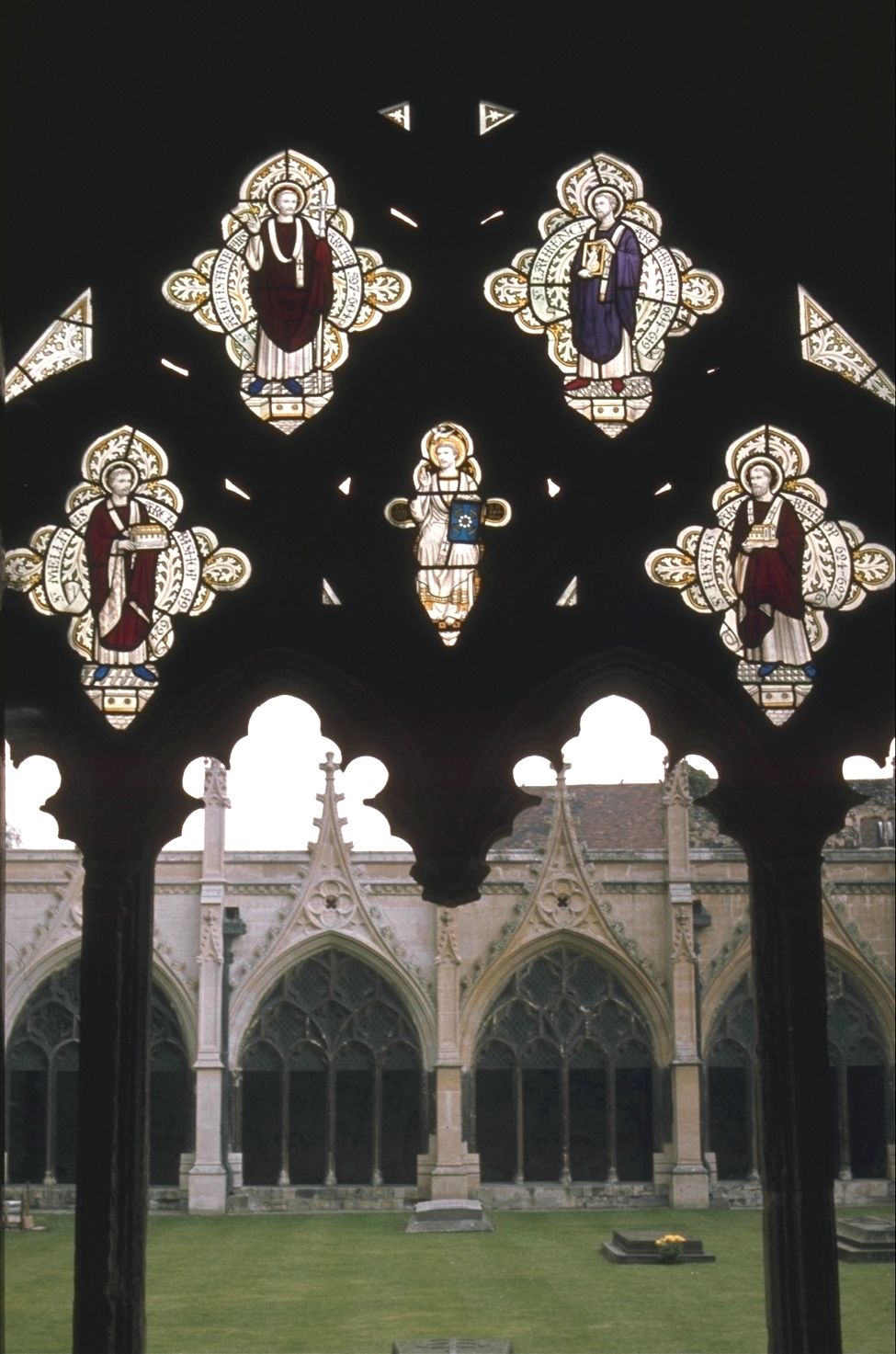
Canterbury Cathedral, the mother church of the worldwide Anglican Communion.

Hus's ecclesiology in De ecclesia heavily influenced later Protestant and Anglican reformers. The Anglican martyrologist John Foxe prominently featured Hus in his Actes and Monuments, celebrating his rejection of papal supremacy as a vital precursor to the English Reformation. Historian Diarmaid MacCulloch notes that while Anglicanism shared Hus's rejection of the absolute authority of the Bishop of Rome, the emerging Church of England maintained a stronger commitment to the visible, institutional Church, diverging from Hus's strictly invisible, predestinarian ecclesiology. This commitment was codified in the Thirty-nine Articles of Religion (1571), which defines the visible Church as "a congregation of faithful men," embracing both a visible structure and the necessity of orthodox preaching and sacraments.

Furthermore, modern Anglican dialogues, such as those conducted by the Anglican-Roman Catholic International Commission (ARCIC), emphasize a conciliar understanding of authority rather than the complete rejection of hierarchy seen in Hus's work. In documents like The Gift of Authority (1999), Anglican theologians acknowledge the historical value of a universal primacy exercised by the Bishop of Rome—contrasting with Hus's absolute denial of the Petrine office—while still maintaining that such authority must function collegially rather than absolutely. Later Protestant reformers, such as Martin Luther, also drew heavily on the work; after reading it during the Leipzig Debate in 1519, Luther famously declared, "We are all Hussites without knowing it."

=== Catholic perspective and the question of unity ===
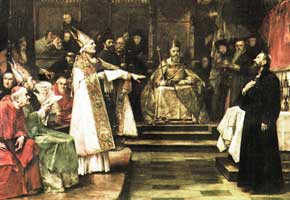
The Council of Constance, where Hus's ecclesiology was debated and condemned by the Catholic Church.

The Catholic Church formally rejected the ecclesiology presented in De ecclesia at the Council of Constance, viewing its definitions as fundamentally subversive to the visible, hierarchical nature of the Church and a threat to Christian unity. Catholic theologians and historians assessing the work have historically criticized Hus for confounding the invisible, spiritual body of the predestined with the visible institution of the Church on earth.

According to the Catholic Encyclopedia, the Church maintained that Hus's absolute denial of the Petrine office and his assertion that the Church is strictly the convocation of the predestined would render the visible sacraments and human cooperation with divine grace irrelevant. At his trial, theologians argued that by defining the Church solely as the predestined, Hus's teachings fundamentally undermined the ecclesiastical authority necessary for maintaining doctrinal unity. Modern historical analysis notes that for the Catholic theologians at Constance, the visible structure of the Church under the Papacy was not merely administrative, but a vital, divinely instituted sacrament of unity meant to guide flawed humanity.

In modern historical and ecumenical theology, however, Catholic scholars have adopted a more nuanced view of Hus's intentions. Polish Cardinal and Church historian Grzegorz Ryś, in his extensive study of Hus, argues that his reformist impulses were fundamentally driven by a desire for the moral and spiritual renewal of a Church in deep crisis during the Western Schism. Ryś emphasizes that Hus was terrified by the moral corruption of the institution, and his radical ecclesiology was an attempt to save the true, spiritual nature of the Church rather than a malicious desire to divide it. This historical contextualization aligns with contemporary ecumenical efforts. Addressing an international symposium on Hus in 1999, Pope John Paul II praised Hus's moral courage and expressed a desire for historical reconciliation and deeper Christian unity.

== Influence ==
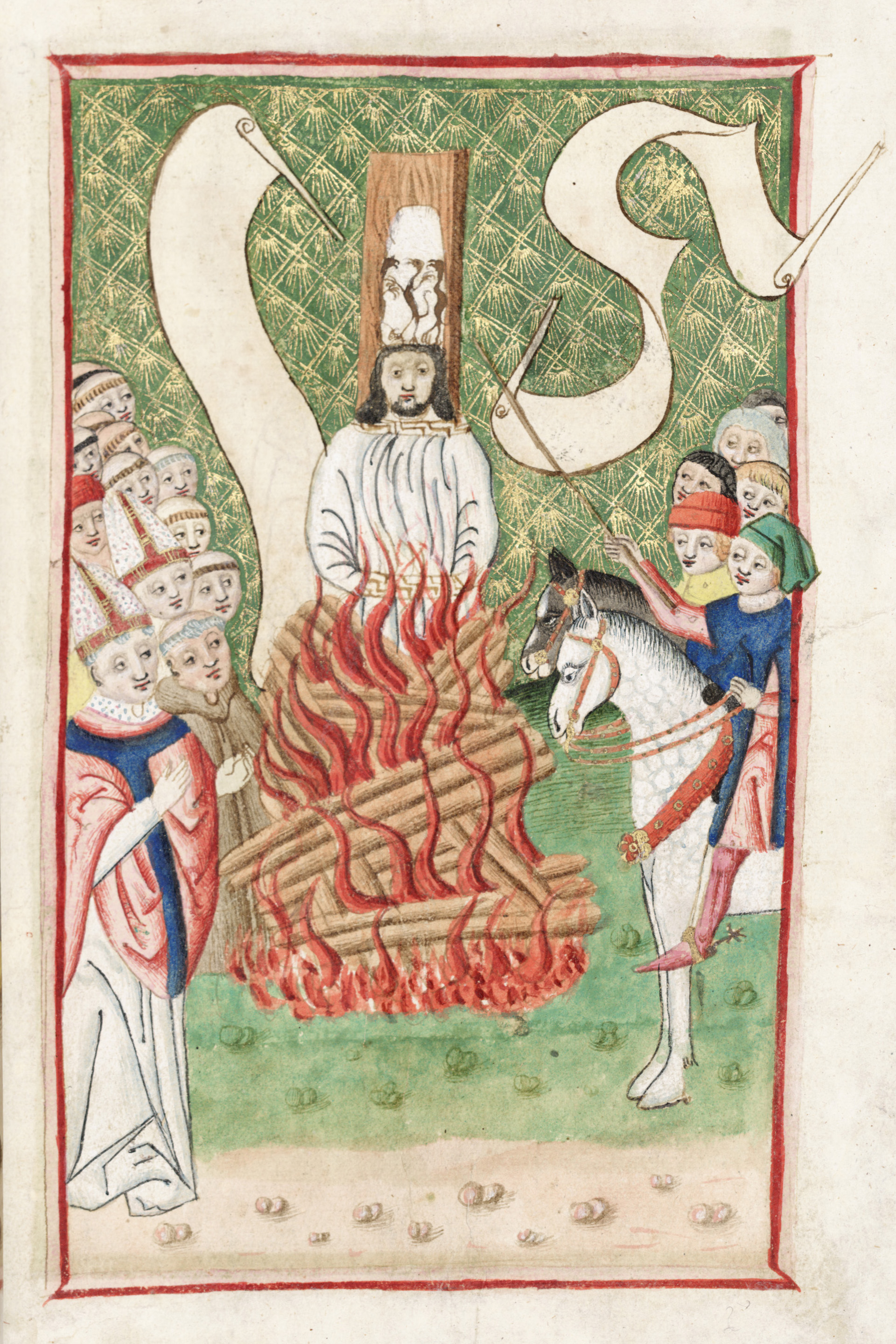
Jan Hus being burned at the stake at the Council of Constance, where the propositions in De ecclesia were condemned.

De ecclesia paved the way for the Hussite rebellion and later the Protestant Reformation. At the Council of Constance, the Church formally condemned the book's teachings as heretical, particularly its denial of papal authority and its deterministic view of salvation.

Following Hus's execution in 1415, the ecclesiology of De ecclesia became the primary theological foundation for the Hussite movement in Bohemia. His followers, particularly the radical Taborites, weaponized his definitions of the "true Church" to justify armed resistance against Catholic crusaders and to establish independent ecclesiastical communities. The text also circulated widely among the Lollards in England, establishing a continuous theological link between Wycliffe, Hus, and the later reformers of the 16th century. Beyond its immediate religious impact, the treatise holds a prominent place in Czech national history, where Hus's defense of individual conscience against institutional authority made him a lasting symbol of Czech identity and resistance.

Later, during the Leipzig Debate in 1519, Martin Luther realized the profound similarities between his own emerging theology and the propositions found in De ecclesia. In 1520, Luther had 2,000 copies of the book printed in Germany, famously acknowledging: "Without knowing it, I taught Hus's doctrine... We are all Hussites without knowing it."

== See also ==
- Jesus
- Mary, mother of Jesus
- Catholic Church
- Mother of the Church
- Anglicanism
- Ecclesiology
- Council of Constance
- Papal primacy
- Predestination
