= Škoda Palace =

Building in Prague, Czech Republic

- Škodův palác
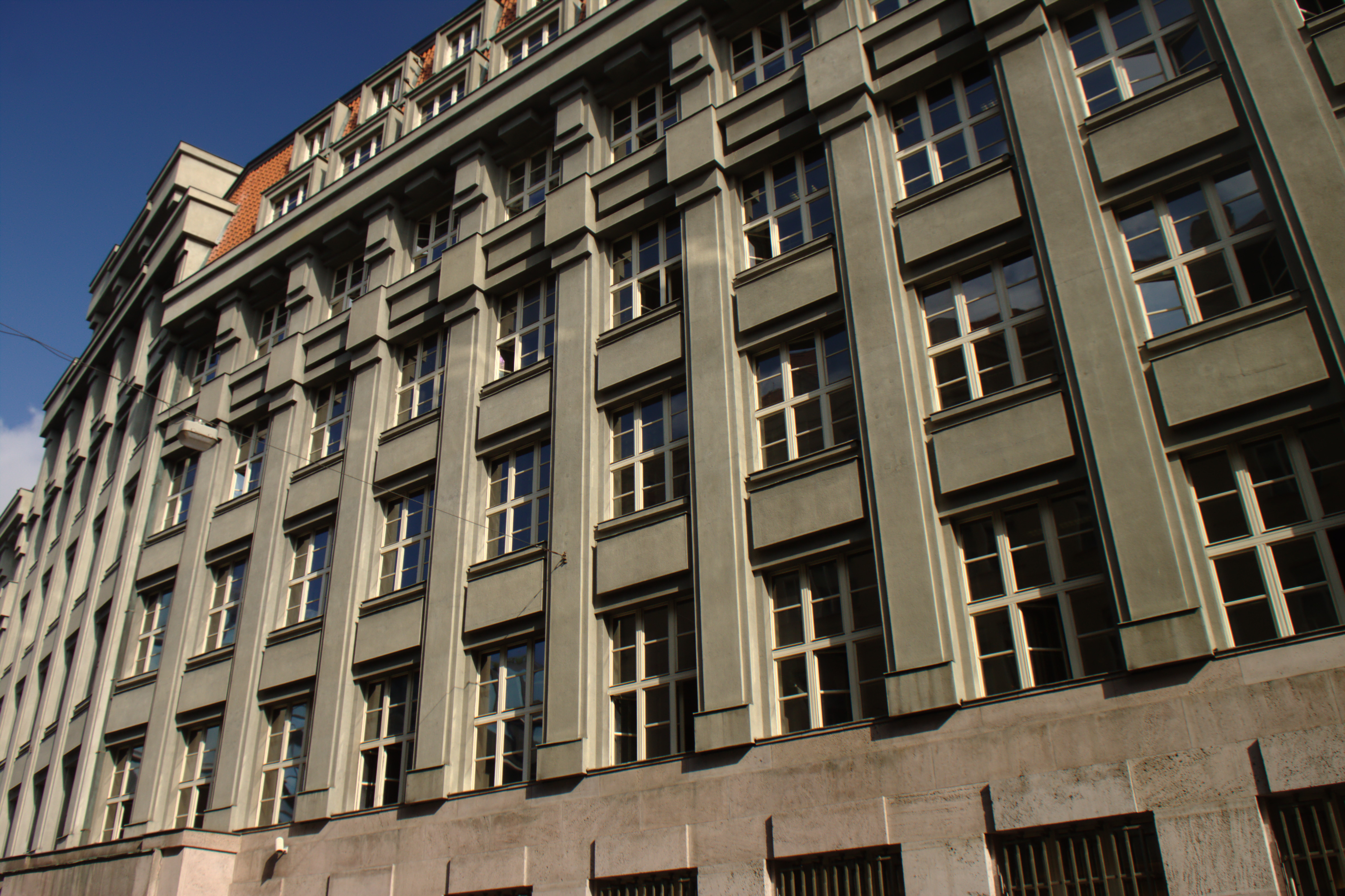
- Interactive map of the Škoda Palace area

General information
- Architectural style: Cubism
- Location: Jungmannova 35/29, Prague 1, Czech Republic, 110 00
- Coordinates: 50°4′55.12″N 14°25′19.49″E
- Completed: 1929

Design and construction
- Architect: Pavel Janák

Website
- Official website

Škoda Palace (Czech: Škodův palác) is the current site of the Prague Town Hall. The late Art Deco building in Jungmannova Street was built in 1929 for the Škoda company using a design by the prominent architect Pavel Janák (Adria Palace, Czernin Palace). The adjacent office building in Charvátova Street dates back to 1937. Even today, both buildings still satisfy the strictest requirements thanks to their flexible arrangement of office and common space within the buildings. The buildings are accessible through several entrances, which allows the interiors to be easily divided into independent sections. The Palace served as the headquarters of the ČEZ Energy Group from 1994 to 2004.

== History ==
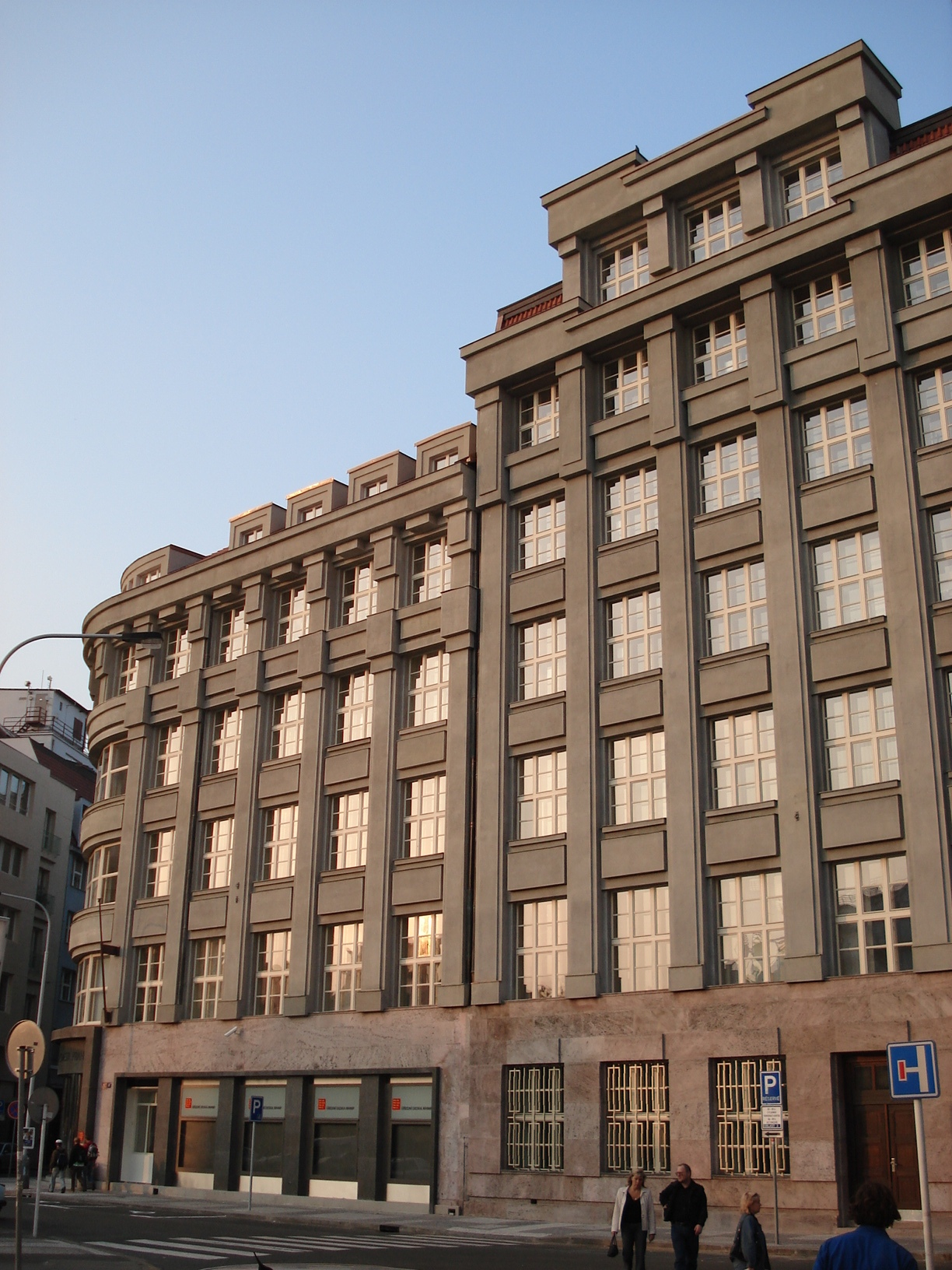
Škoda Palace

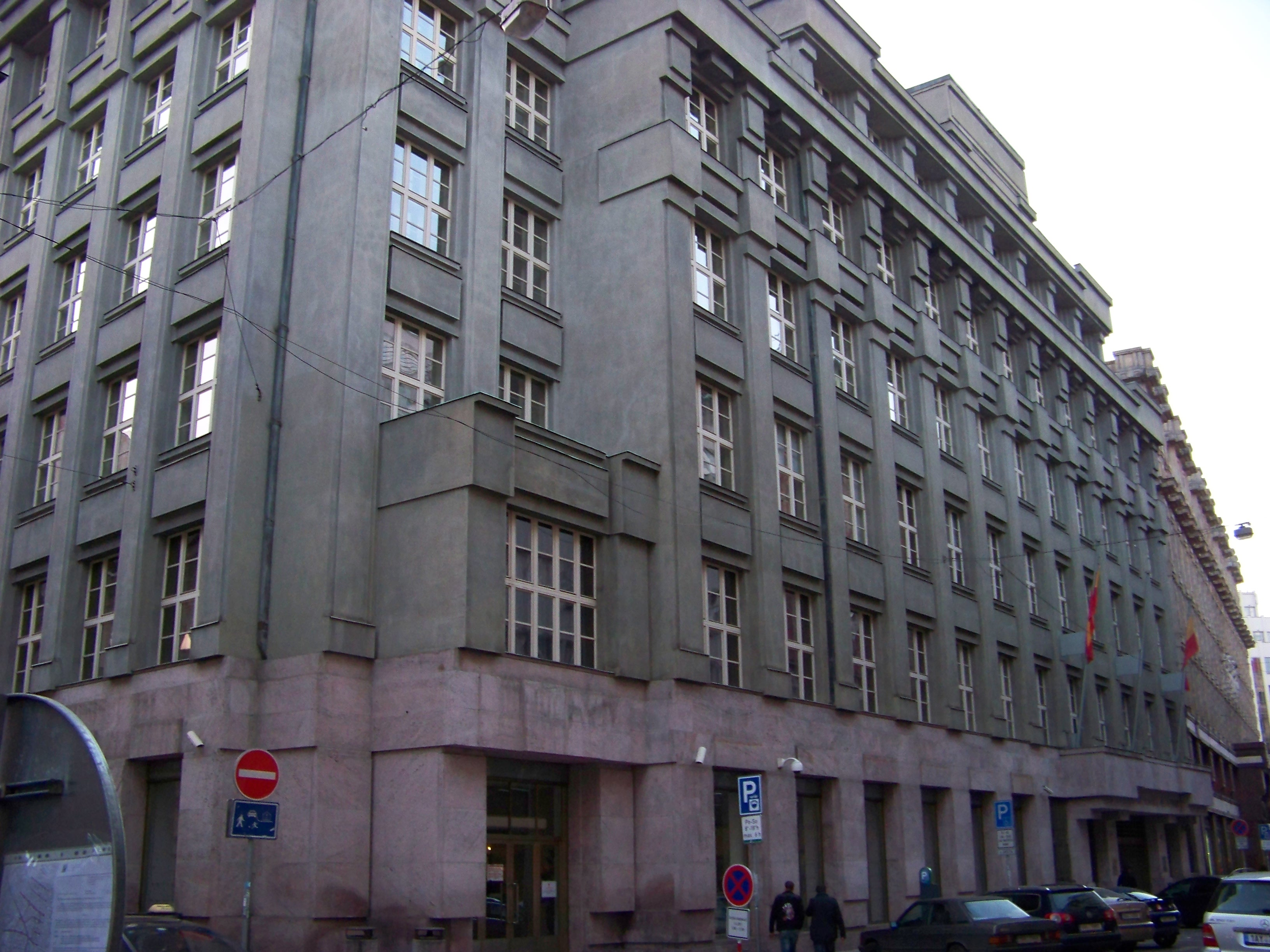
Škoda Palace

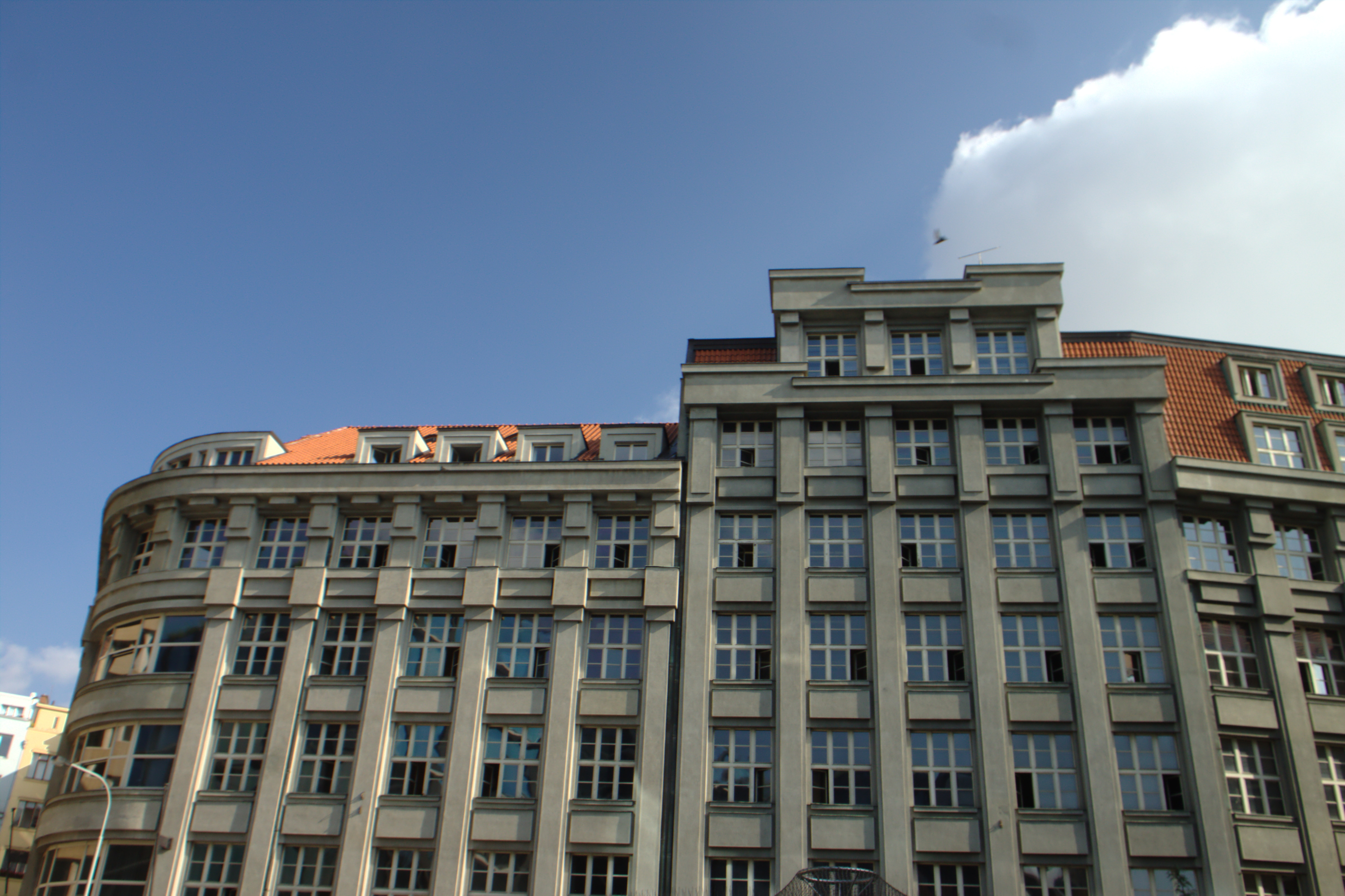
Škoda Palace

The property located on land lot no 718 in the cadastral area of New Town. (currently situated below Building No 35 in Jungmannova) was built at the turn of the 1920s and 1930s on the site of several houses as an office building for the head office of Škoda (Škodovy závody) Plzeň. Professor Pavel Janák is the author of the design; the Nekvasil construction company from Prague's Karlín prepared the detailed engineering design.

The initial plan for land lots nos. 34 and 35 was just to condense the existing development defined primarily by the late Baroque Thun-Salm Palace. Among others, parties interested in development at that site included the Melantrich publishing house that commissioned a design from the architects Bohumil Hypšman and František Roith. Subsequently, however, Škoda purchased both the land lot and the building and architect Mr Tomíček, the chief architect of Nekvasil, a construction and design company from Karlín, was asked to design a solution. He came up with an intriguing design in 1923 but it was not chosen eventually. The Town Hall suggested either calling for tenders for the design or commissioning a selected architect to design the solution. In the end, Pavel Janák, a professor of Prague's Academy of Arts, Architecture and Design was entrusted with the task, perhaps because he had also authored the neighbouring facility, the Adria Palace. His first design of 1924 met with a good response from the heritage authorities (as it envisaged incorporating the existing baroque façade in the new street front), but the client and investor was against it, so only Janák's second design was built.

The building was completed around 1926 and then modified until the 1930s, mainly by remodelling the corner of Jungmannova and Charvátova Streets where a car dealership was built.

The first stage was later followed by stage two on land lot no 719 in the cadastral area of New Town (currently situated below Building No 41 in Charvátova,), which was completed around 1938, if we include the modifications of the second underground level as a civil defence shelter in the project.

For its time, the Palace was a generous development project: its developed area is approximately 5,000 sq m; with two underground and seven aboveground floors the total usable area is almost 28,000 sq m. These spaces are situated around two backyards in order to limit areas without natural daylight and ensure good ventilation. The aboveground floors house offices (in particular, the presentational areas for the CEO Mr Škoda on the second aboveground floor are worth mentioning) while the underground areas included technical and operational background, archives, an extensive vault and the civil defence shelter mentioned above. The building uses seven staircases with lifts.

Škoda Palace currently houses some of the Prague Town Hall Departments, e.g. the departments of Environment, Culture, Heritage Care and Travel, Trade Licences, and Transportation. A new addition that will make communicating with the authority much easier for Prague citizens is the modern filing room on the ground floor.

In October 2016 majority owner of Škoda Palace engaged one of Europe's most highly respected and influential architects Eva Jiřičná. She will be tasked with defining a vision of how this art deco Palace could be converted into a vibrant, inspiring and welcoming contemporary retail and office space, while at the same time respecting the historic value of the Palace's original design.

The building's corridor – reminiscent of a passage connecting Jungmannova and Charvátova Streets – underwent only minimum alterations as part of the original plan for the refurbishment of the building and it currently serves as an exhibition hall.

== Sculpture – a composition for the attic gable of Škoda Company in Prague ==
Unfortunately, the building has lost its beautiful logo designed by Otto Gutfreund, which was installed on the attic gable: it was a gear incorporating the well-known winged arrow motif. The sculpture was removed for a repair once but someone took it to a scrap yard... However, the model and the drawings still exist, should the Town hall think about restoring the work of art.

== Comprehensive background and operation ==
The building is assigned to serve as an office building for the Prague Town Hall. The structural modifications are led by an attempt to loosen up the ground plan, which may be too tight by today's standards, and combine the smallest office areas into larger wholes. On all floors, office space is complemented with the requisite operating background. The ground floor is intended for the interaction between the authority and the general public. The interconnection of both buildings by prolonging the original passage with entrances from Jungmannova and Charvátova streets is a major modification. This interior passage is linked to the premises housing administrative agendas on one side (filing room, DSA counter hall, Prague Municipal Transport office, information offices of the various departments), areas used for information on and presentation of Prague, and service outlets such as photocopying, refreshments, signature certification etc. The underground floors are modified as archives and technical and process background of the facility.

== A project of unprecedented scale ==
The history of Škoda Palace dates back to the turn of the 1920s and 1930s when the former site of several houses gave rise to a magnificent office building intended as the headquarters of Škoda Company in Plzeň. The author of the design was Pavel Janák, the Nekvasil construction company from Prague's Karlín prepared the detailed engineering design and was the project contractor. For its time, the Palace was a generous development project: its developed area is approximately 5,000 sq m; with two underground and seven aboveground floors the total usable area is almost 28,000 sq m. These spaces are arranged around two backyards in order to minimise areas without natural daylight and optimise ventilation. The aboveground floors house offices (in particular, the presentational areas for the CEO Mr Škoda on the second aboveground floor are worth mentioning) while the underground areas included technical and operational background, archives, an extensive vault and a civil defence shelter. The building is vertically served by seven staircases and 14 lifts
