= Pavel Janák =

Czech architect

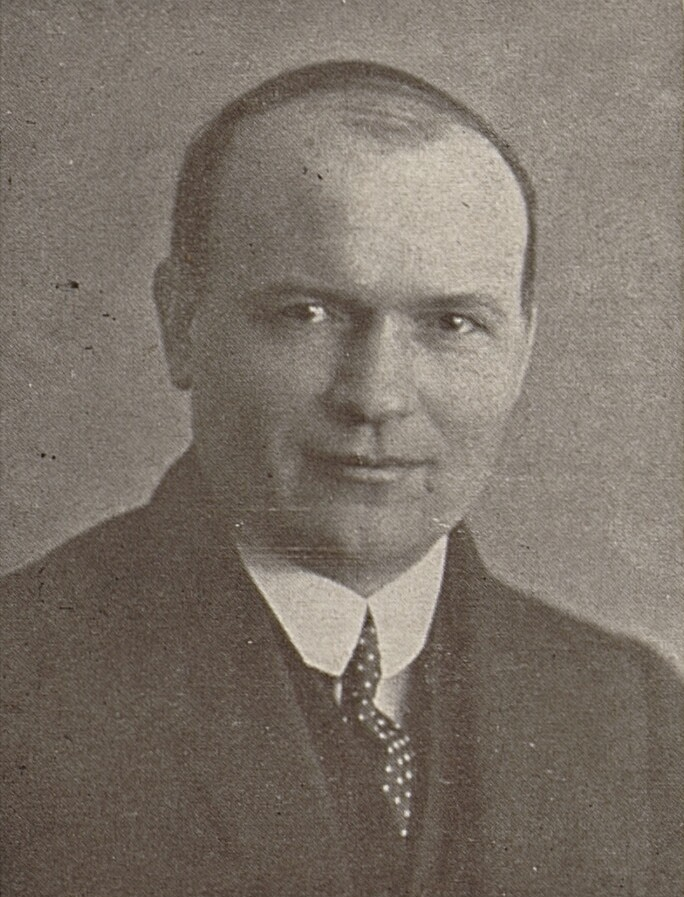
Pavel Janák

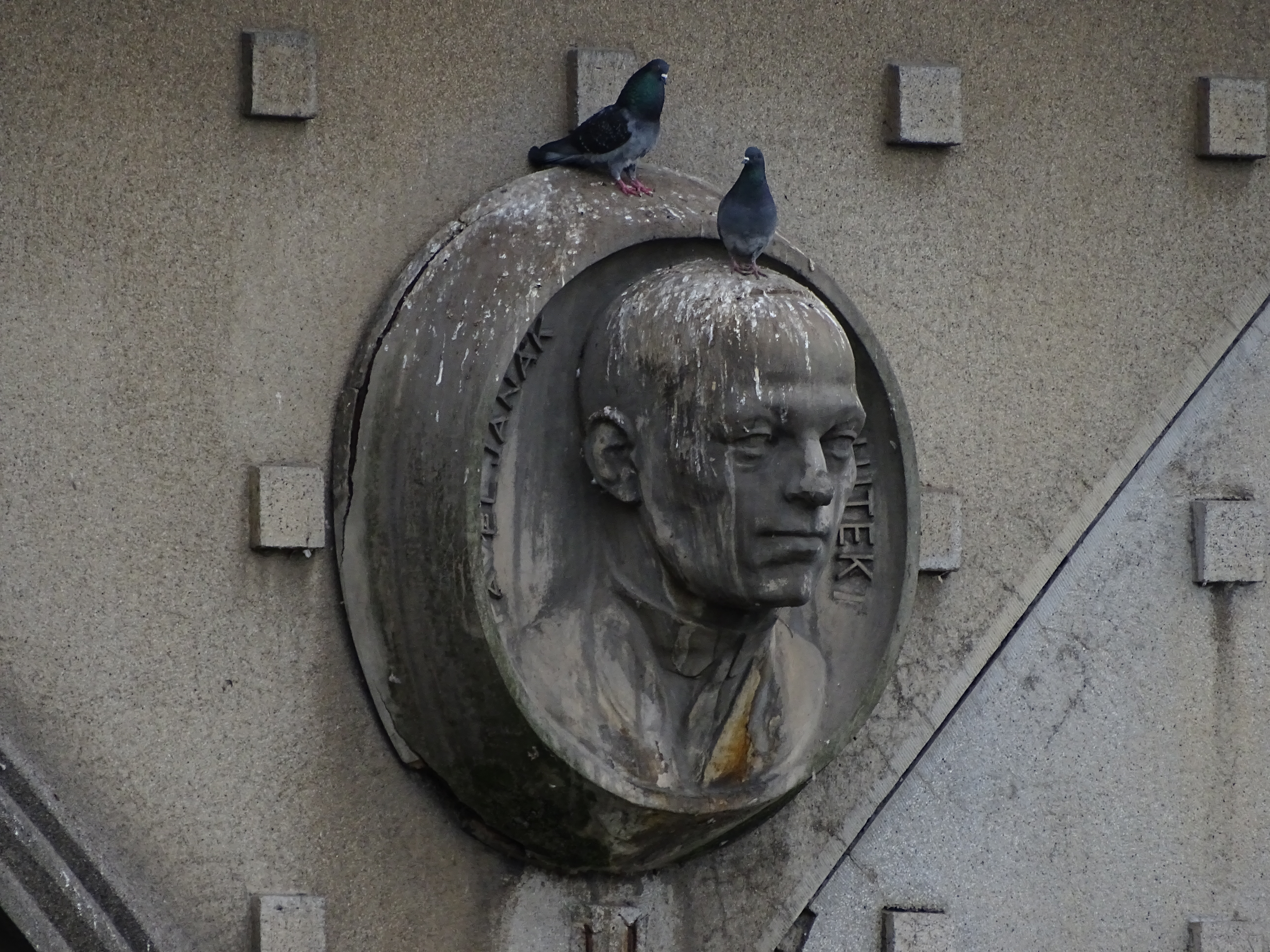
Prague-Holešovice, Czech Republic. Hlávkův most, a relief of Pavel Janák

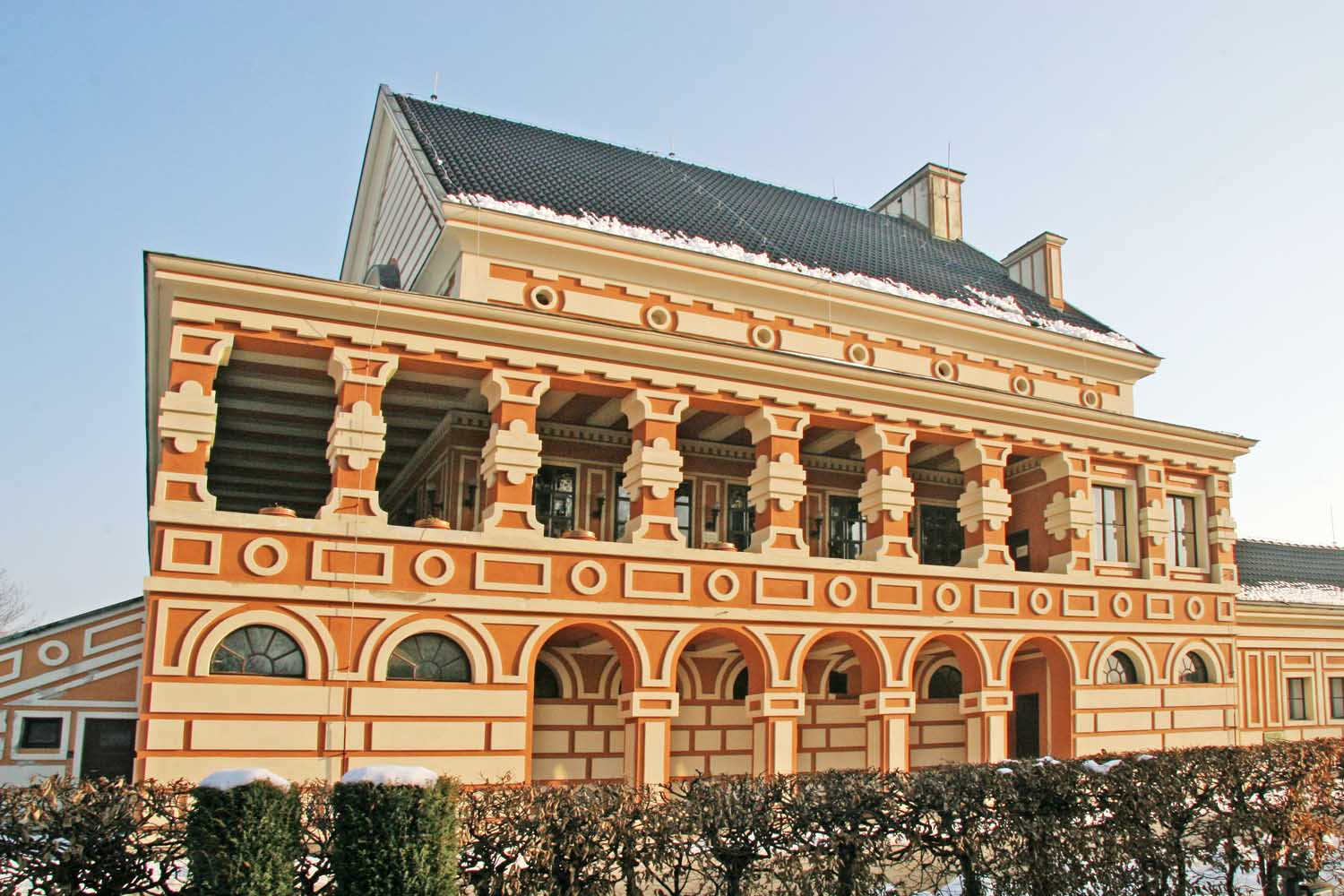
Crematorium at Pardubice

Pavel Janák (12 March 1881 in Karlín – 1 August 1956 in Prague-Dejvice) was a Czech modernist architect, furniture designer, town planner, professor and theoretician.

== Life ==
Janák studied with Otto Wagner in Vienna between 1906 and 1908, and worked in Prague under Jan Kotěra. In 1911, with the publication of an article The Prism and The Pyramid advocating dynamic architectural compositions and destabilizing traditional right-angled buildings, Janák became the leading theoretician of Czech Cubism. Of the three Czech cubists—Janák, Josef Chochol and Josef Gočár—Janák built fewer buildings and produced more theoretical work, but his 1913 Fara House in Pelhřimov is a key work in that style.

After 1918 Janák and Gočár developed Cubism into Czech Rondocubism, with decoration taken from folk and nationalist themes, and then subsequently into a purer functionalism. His 1925 Palace Adria is an unusually late example of integrated sculpture. As the chairman of the Czechoslovak Werkbund he drew up the master plan for the 1932 Baba Werkbund Housing Estate, the last of the European housing exhibitions, and also designed 3 of its 32 houses. He was also responsible for the design for the Hussite Church in Vinohrady.

In 1936 he took over from Jože Plečnik as the supervising architect of Prague Castle.

Pavel Janák was also associated with the functionalist Baba housing project in Prague, the Werkbund inspired housing estate located on the outskirts of Prague. Pavel Janák created the Master Plan for this community, and was also in charge of selecting the architects that would be involved. Although Baba survived the World Wars, it is now in danger of historical extinction due to recent renovations and neglect.

In 2006, the Government of the Czech Republic named Janák an Honorary Citizen of Prague 6.

== Gallery ==
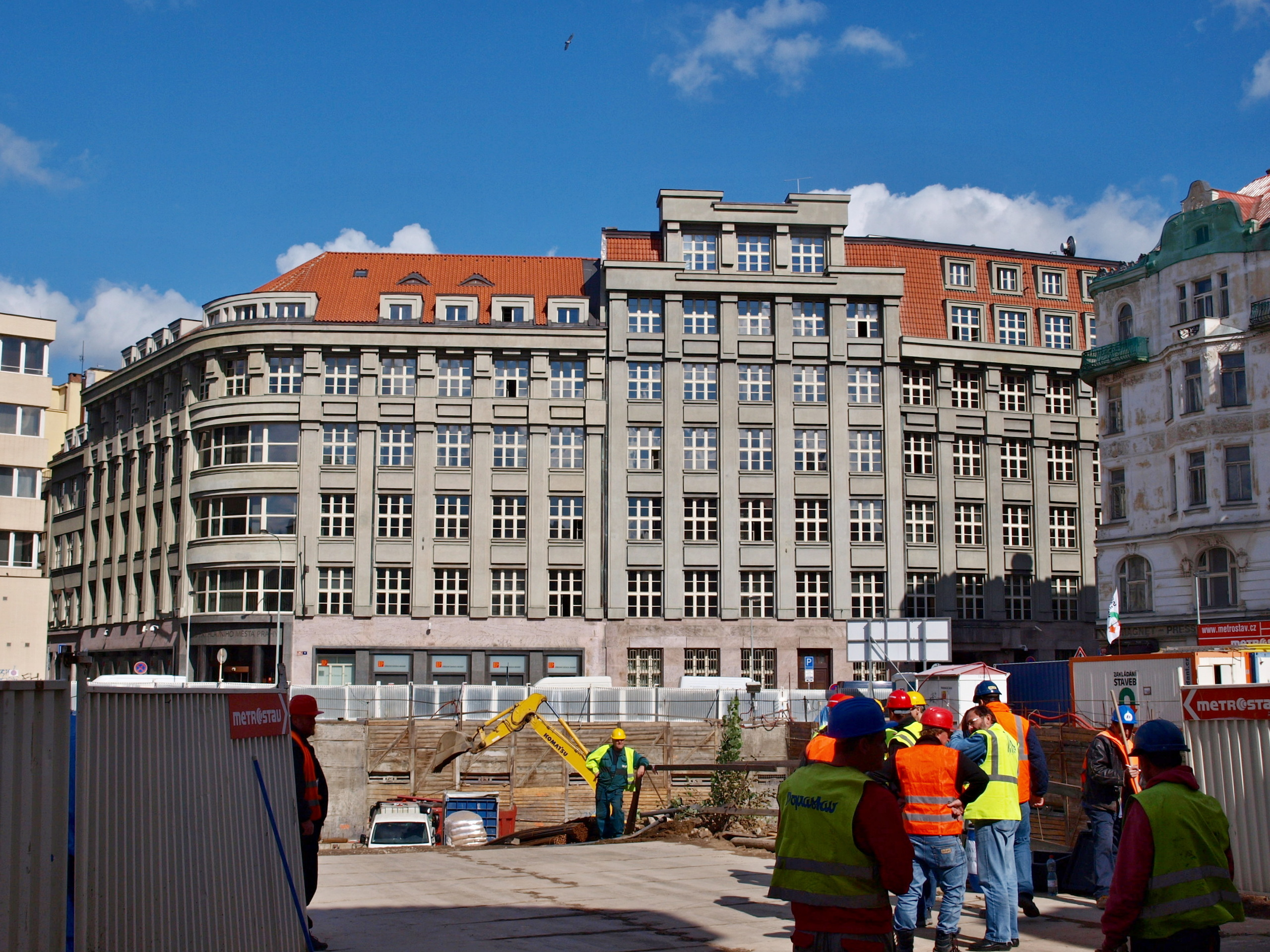
Škodův Palace, Prague

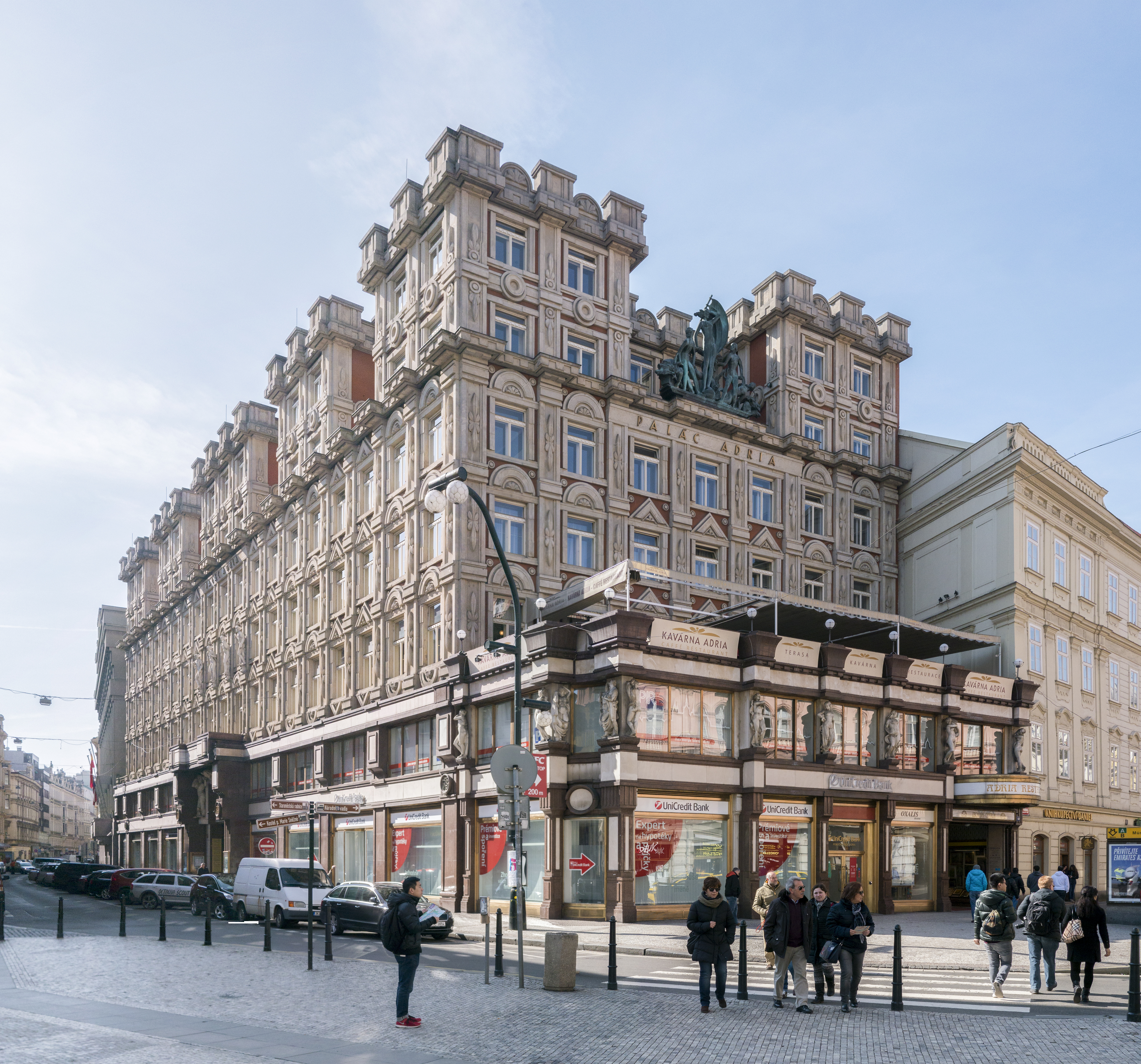
Palace Adria, Prague

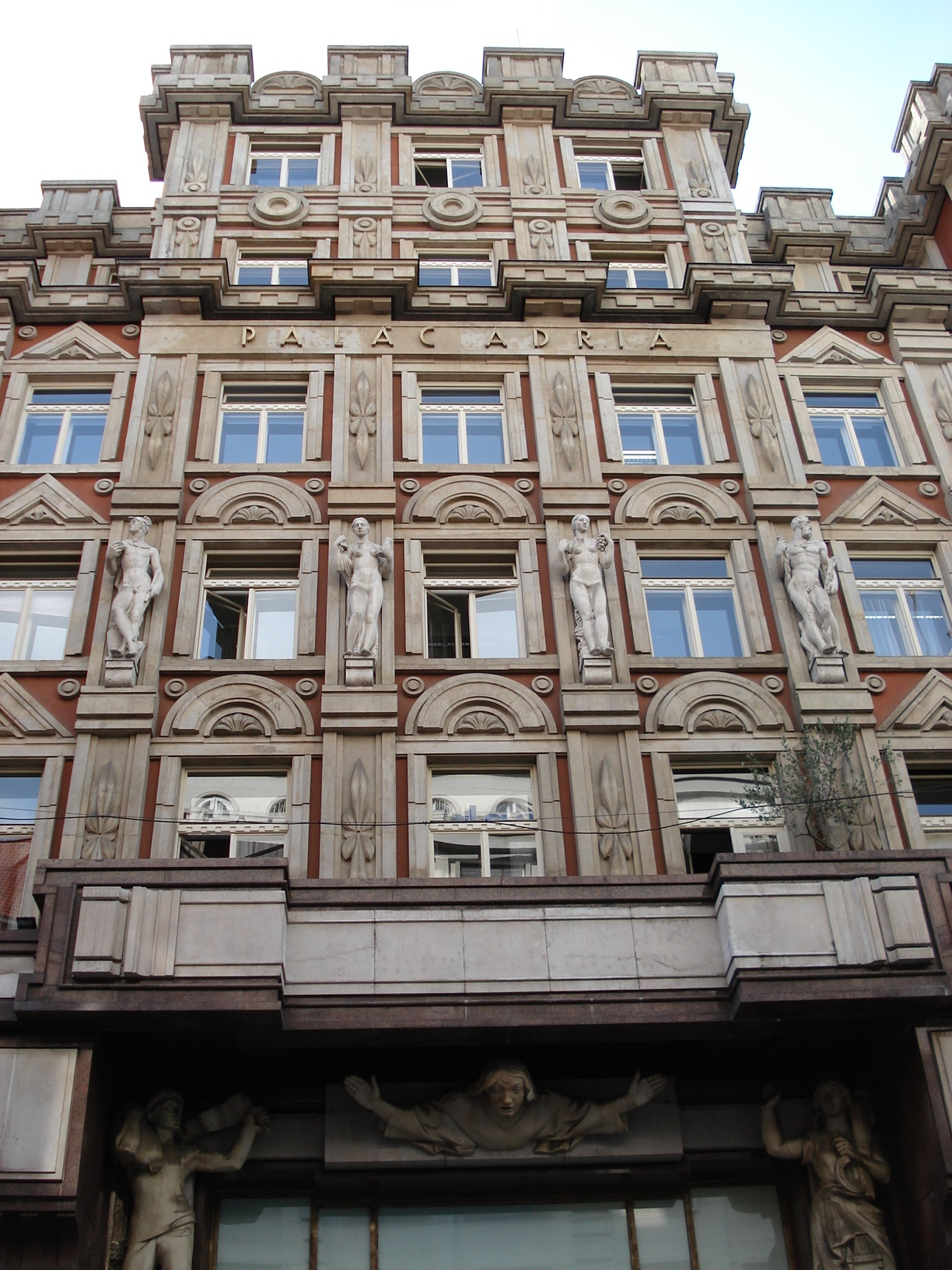
Palace Adria, Prague

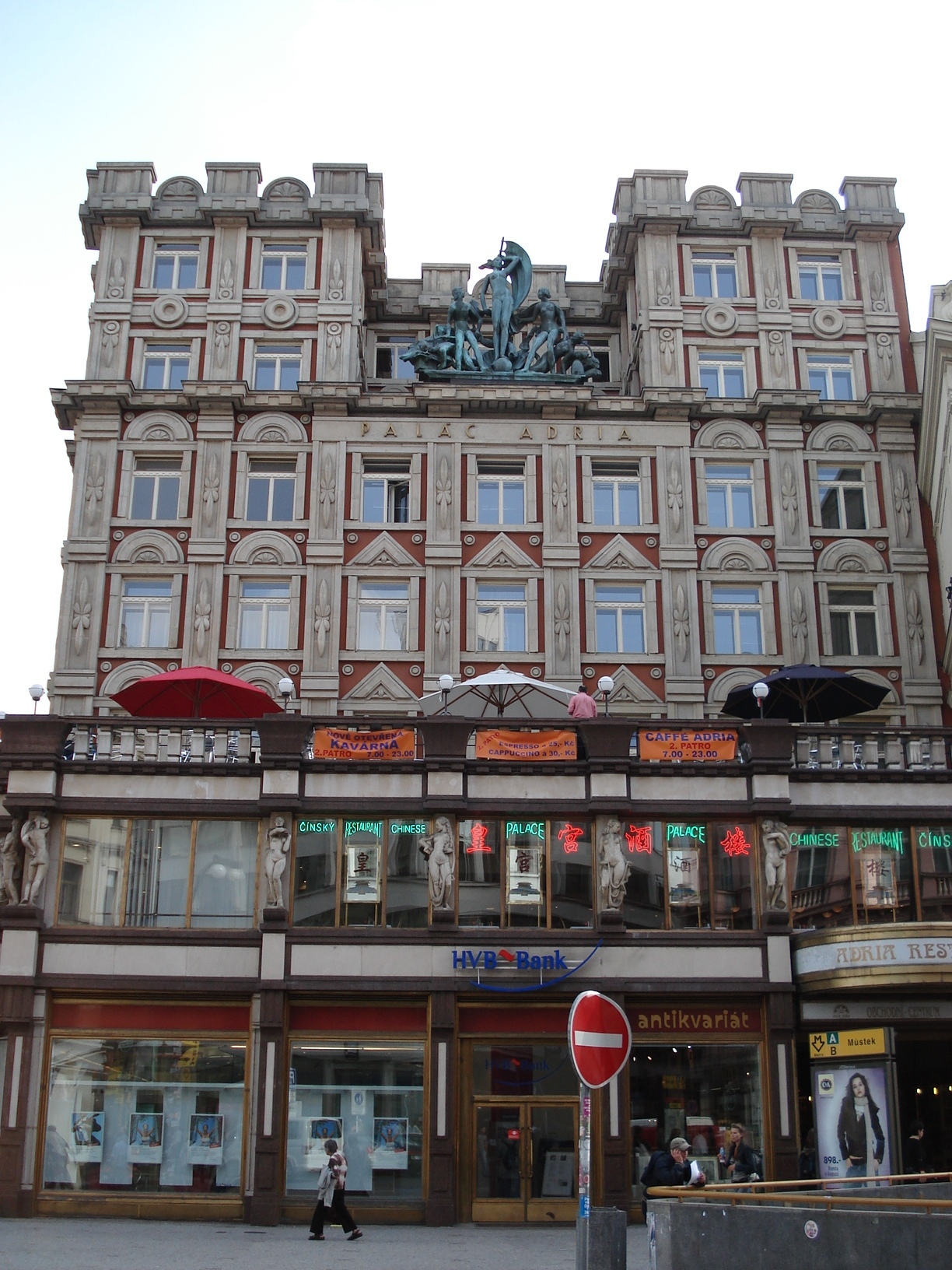
Palace Adria, Prague

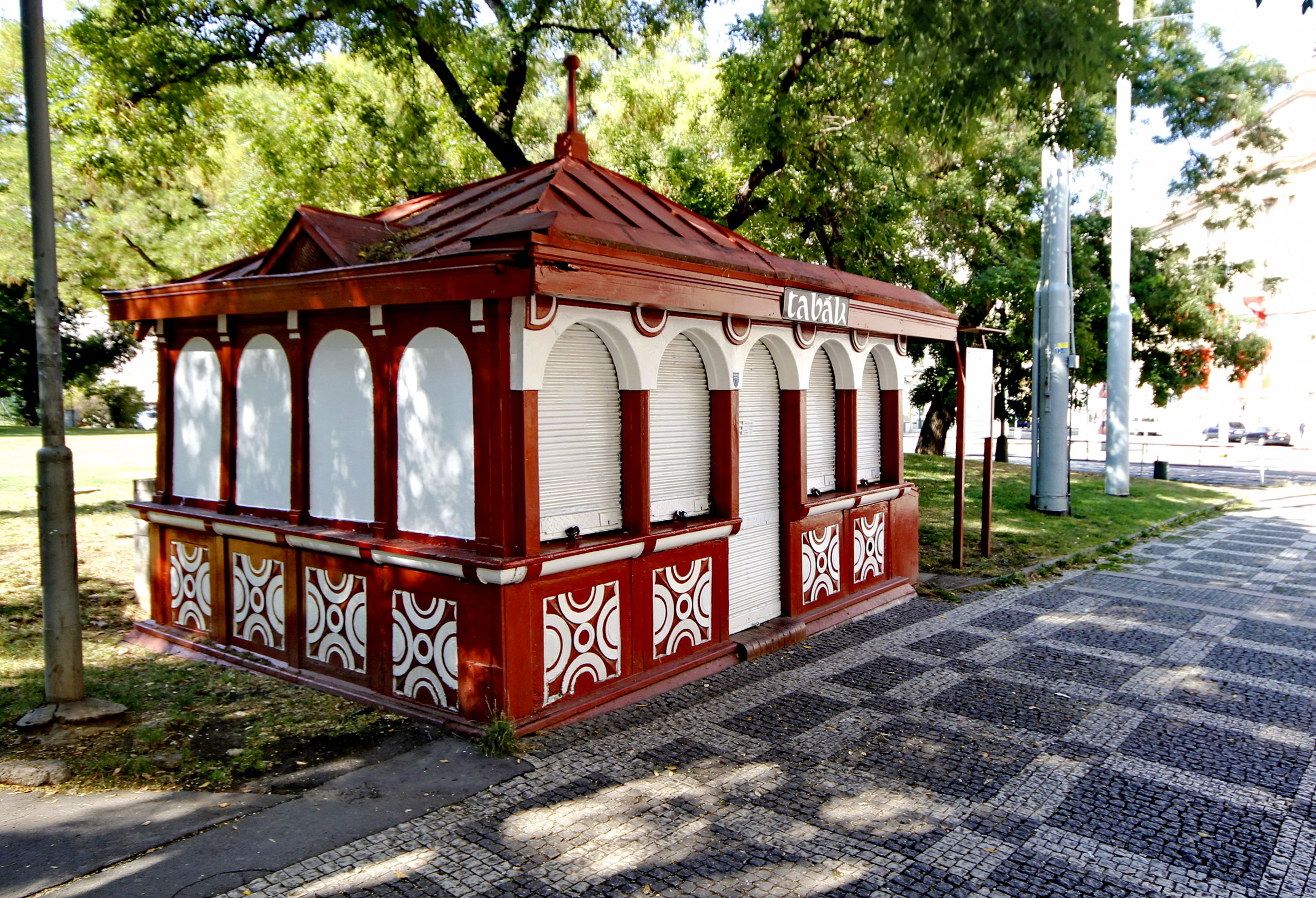
Cubist kiosk near Bolzanova Street, Praha 1-Nové Město

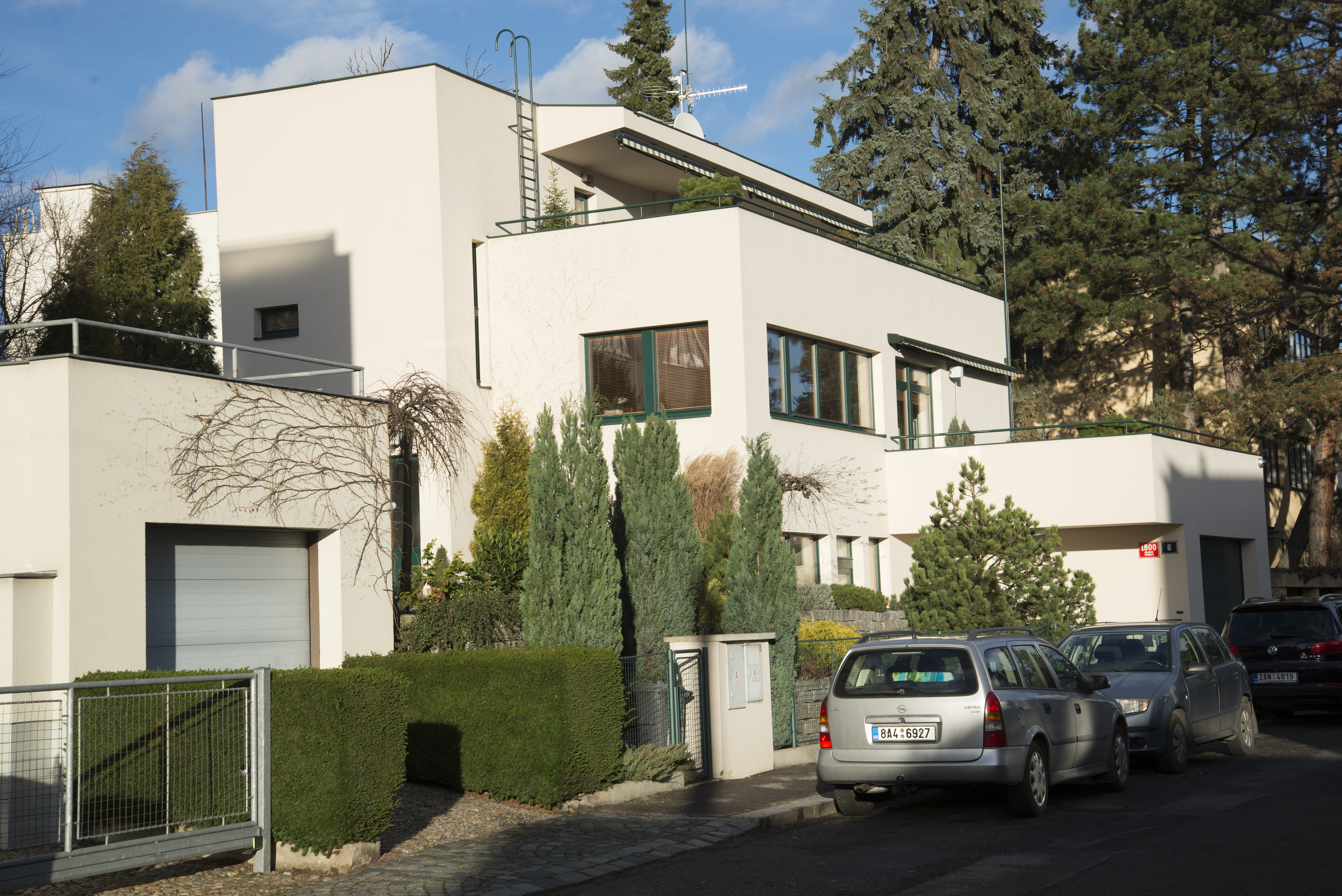
Villa Linda (1933–1934)
