= Vinohrady Water Tower =

- Vinohradská vodárna
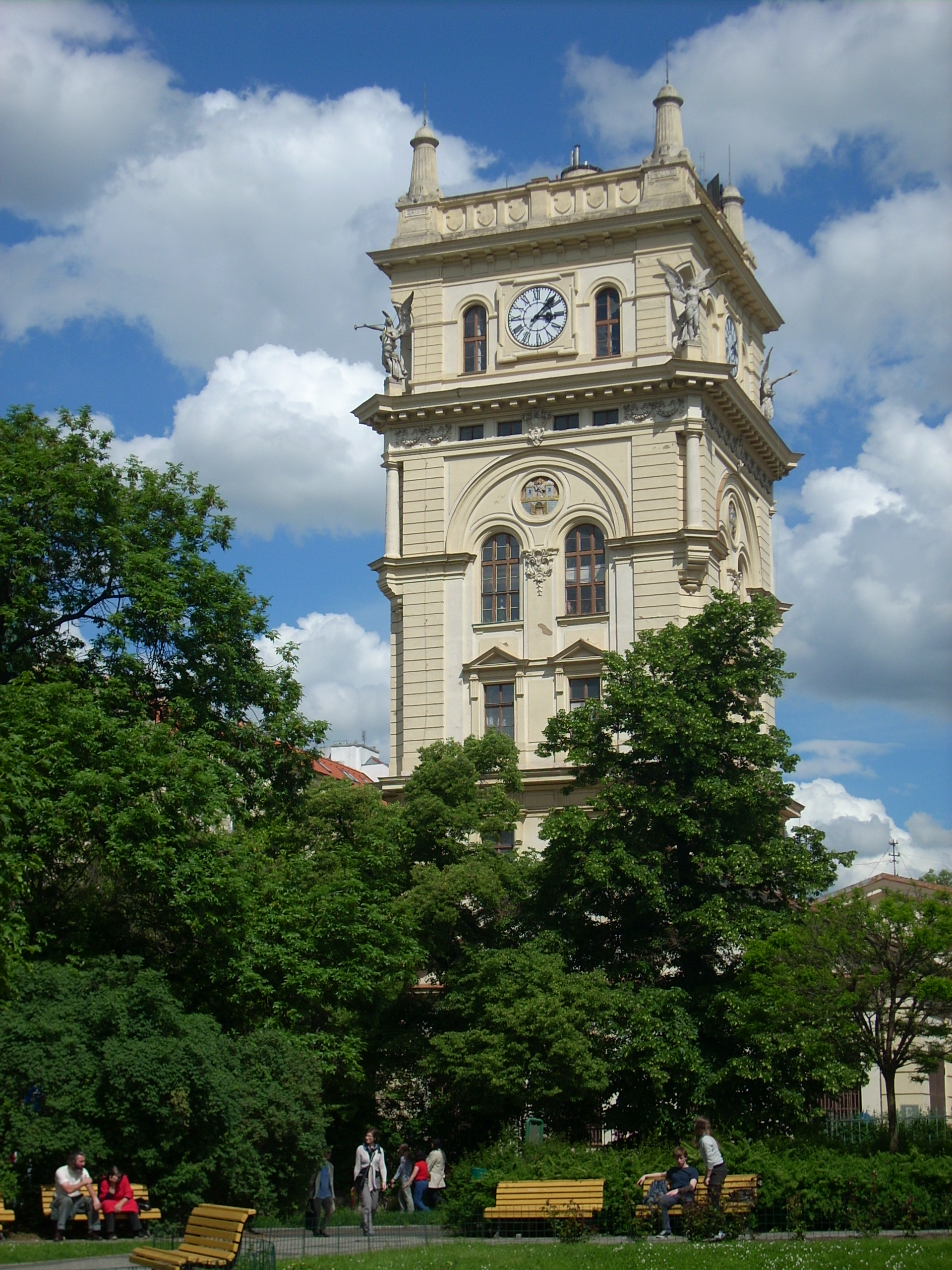
- The tower
- Interactive map of the Vinohrady Water Tower area

General information
- Type: Water Tower
- Location: 725 Korunní Street, Prague, Czech Republic
- Coordinates: 50.0752°N 14.4491°E
- Completed: 1882
- Owner: City of Prague, Czech Republic

Technical details
- Floor count: >7

Design and construction
- Architect: Antonín Turek

Vinohrady Water Tower (Czech: Vinohradská vodárna) is a building in Vinohrady in Prague 10 which was originally built as a water tower. Today its architecture is recognized as culturally important although it is now converted to accommodate offices and apartments. The viewing platform at the top is 40 metres above the street level. Its tourism helps pay for over 20,000 dollars' worth of repairs and maintenance a year.

== History ==
The Vinohrady water tower building was created in 1882 to house steam engines and an underground reservoir. The engines pumped water up from the reservoir, creating a gravitational feed to nearby homes and businesses. Antonin Turek designed the building while he was the municipal architect.

The seventh floor originally contained a tank that could hold 200 cubic metres of water. Initially this was pumped from the River Vltava until 1912, when the water source was switched to a plant at Káraný. The water descended from the tank to supply Strašnice, Žižkov and Vršovice with drinking water.

In 1914 the tower's steam engines were replaced with electric motors. The revised system used water that was treated at a plant at Podolí and then stored in water tanks underground before being pumped to the top of this tower for use.

== Architecture ==
Today its architecture is acknowledged to be of national historical importance, even though the building serves no modern purpose for water supply, as the motors, pumps and pipes have been removed. In 1993, the inside was converted to accommodate offices and apartments. The viewing platform at the top is 40 metres above the street level – once this provided a commanding view of the area, but today it is only slightly taller than the tenements that surround the tower. On each corner there are the statues of angels with clock faces between them. Below the clocks are four medallions celebrating Vinohrady. In 1991 the tower was recognised as being of cultural importance and was listed by the Czech Ministry of Culture.
