= Kozí hrádek =

- Sezimovo Ústí in Czech Republic
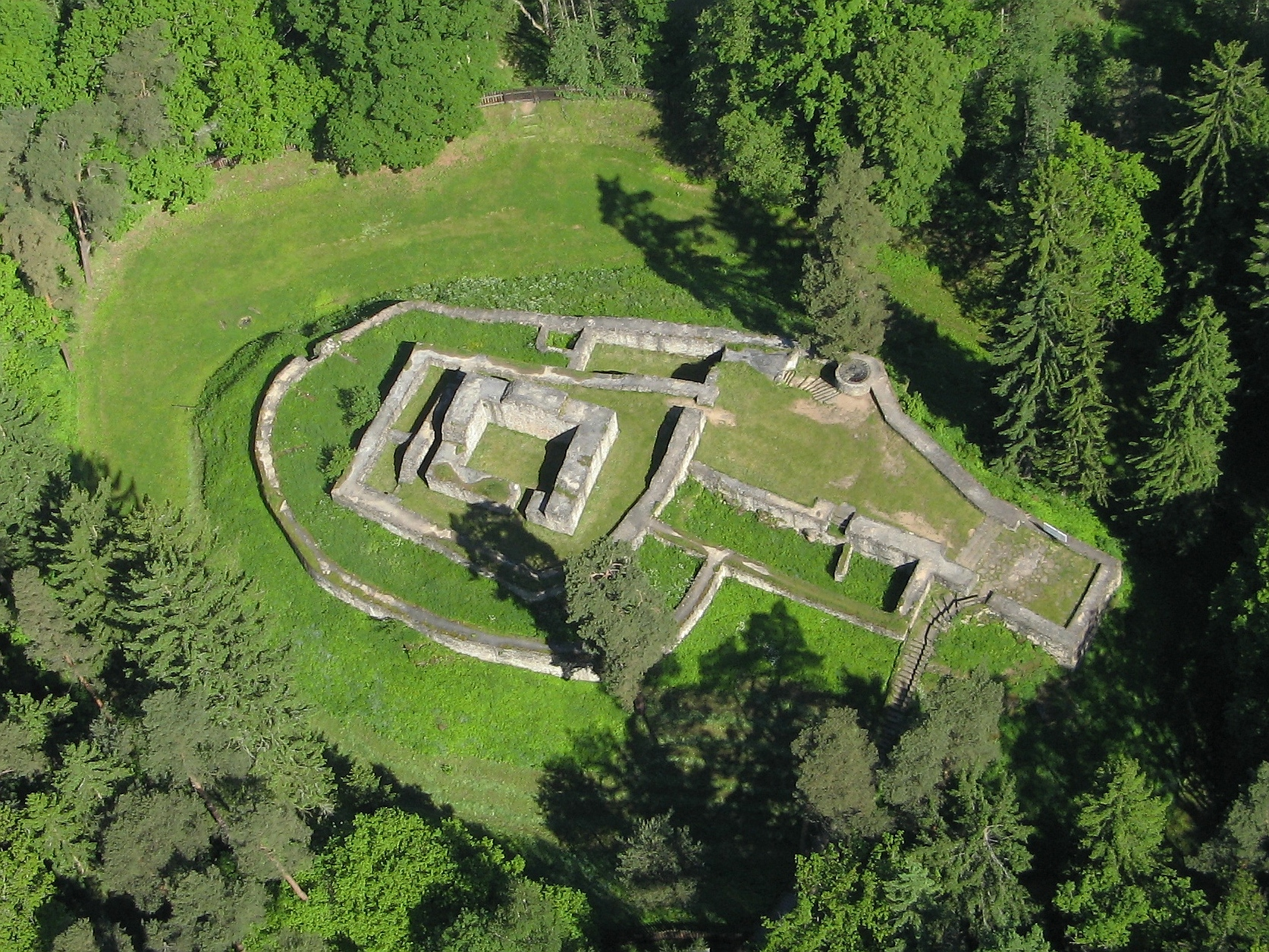
- Aerial view of the ruins of Kozí hrádek

Site information
- Type: Castle
- Owner: Town of Sezimovo Ústí
- Open to the public: Yes
- Status: National cultural monument
- Condition: Ruins

Location
- Coordinates: 49°23′20″N 14°43′22″E

Site history
- Built: 14th century

Kozí hrádek (lit. 'little goat castle'; German: Ziegenburg) is a ruined medieval Gothic castle in the South Bohemian Region of the Czech Republic. The castle is best known as the refuge of the Bohemian religious reformer Jan Hus from 1413 to 1414. Following its destruction by fire during the Hussite Wars in 1438, the castle was abandoned and left to ruin. Today, the extensively excavated site is protected as a national cultural monument.

== Geography ==
Kozí hrádek is situated on a rocky promontory above the stream Kozský potok in the territory of Sezimovo Ústí, approximately 2.5 kilometres (1.6 mi) east of the town proper.

== History ==
=== Early history ===
Kozí hrádek was likely founded in the 14th century. The first written mention of the castle dates back to 21 January 1377, when it was held by a nobleman named Vlček of Kozí. Subsequently, the castle passed to the Lords of Hardegg. Jan of Hardegg the Younger, referred to as the "Count of Kozí," owned it until 1387. In 1391, the castle and its surrounding estates were sold to Jindřich I of Hradec for 2,000 Prague groschen. By 1406, the property had passed into the hands of Vilém of Újezd (died 1408), who became the founder of the Kozský of Kozí noble family.

=== Jan Hus's refuge ===
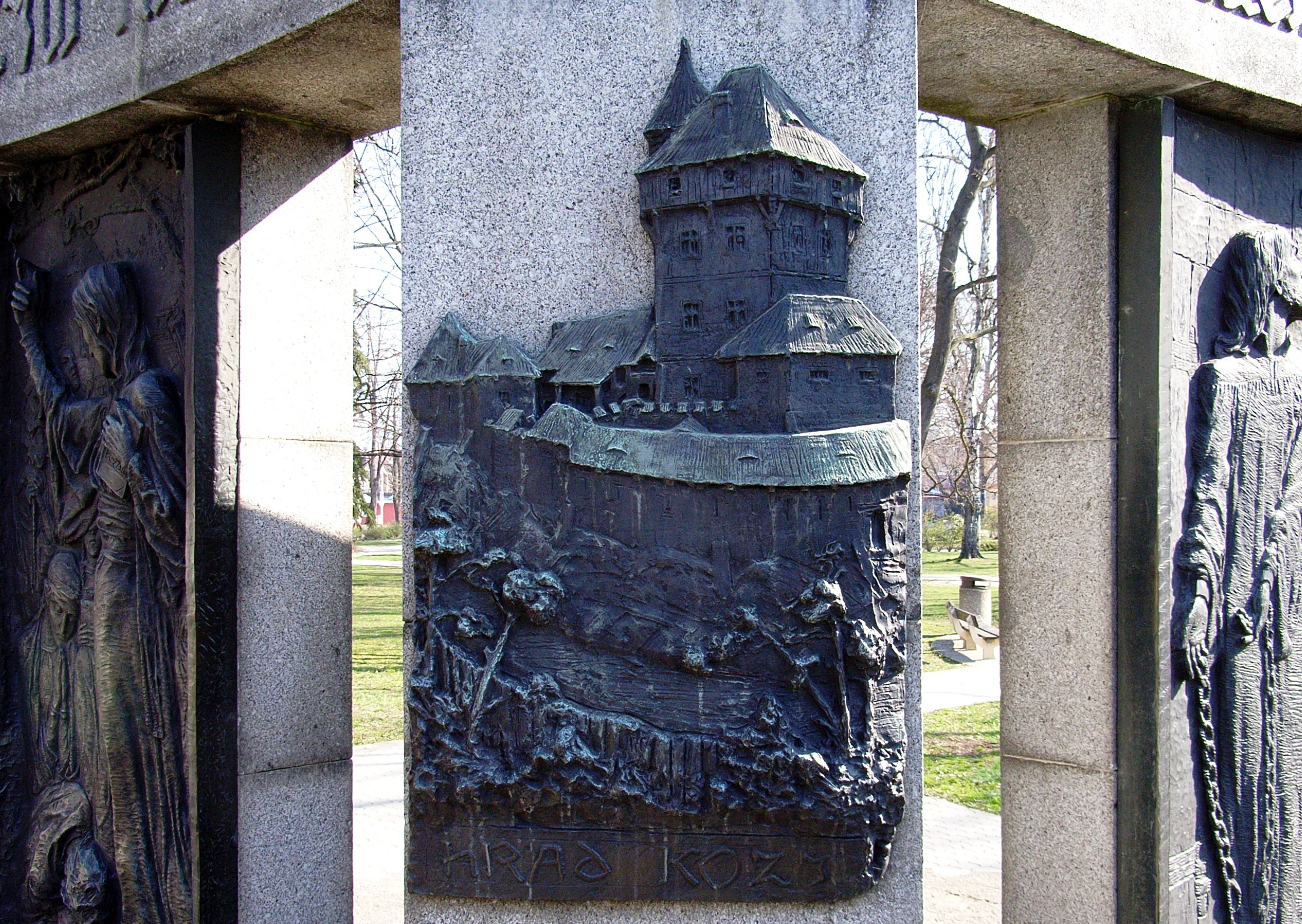
Relief of Kozí hrádek on the Jan Hus monument in Tábor by František Bílek

The most significant period in the castle's history occurred between 1412 (or 1413) and 1414. During this time, Vilém's sons, Jan of Ústí and Ctibor of Kozí, provided sanctuary to the excommunicated priest and early church reformer Jan Hus, who had been forced into exile and had to leave Prague.

During his stay at Kozí hrádek, Hus continued to preach to followers in the surrounding countryside and dedicated himself to writing some of his most important theological works. It was here that he authored his monumental Latin treatise De ecclesia (On the Church), as well as Postilla, On Simony, Exposition of the Faith, and several other works in the Czech language.

=== Destruction and abandonment ===
Following the execution of Jan Hus at the Council of Constance and the subsequent outbreak of the Hussite Wars, the castle and its lands fell under the control of the radical Taborite community. The castle was largely uninhabited during this turbulent period. In 1438, Kozí hrádek was destroyed by a fire, which was likely sparked by the besieging troops of King Albert II of Habsburg during his military campaign against the nearby stronghold of Tábor.

After the wars, the ruined castle became the property of the town of Tábor. It was never rebuilt; historical land registries from 1542 list the castle as completely deserted. In 1573, it was sold to the poet Pavel Lučín, who in turn sold it to Zikmund Pek of Římek. Throughout the 16th and 17th centuries, the abandoned structure was used by local villagers as a convenient source of building stone for nearby settlements like Meziříčí. By the 19th century, the site was completely covered in structural debris and heavily overgrown with vegetation.

== Excavation and conservation ==
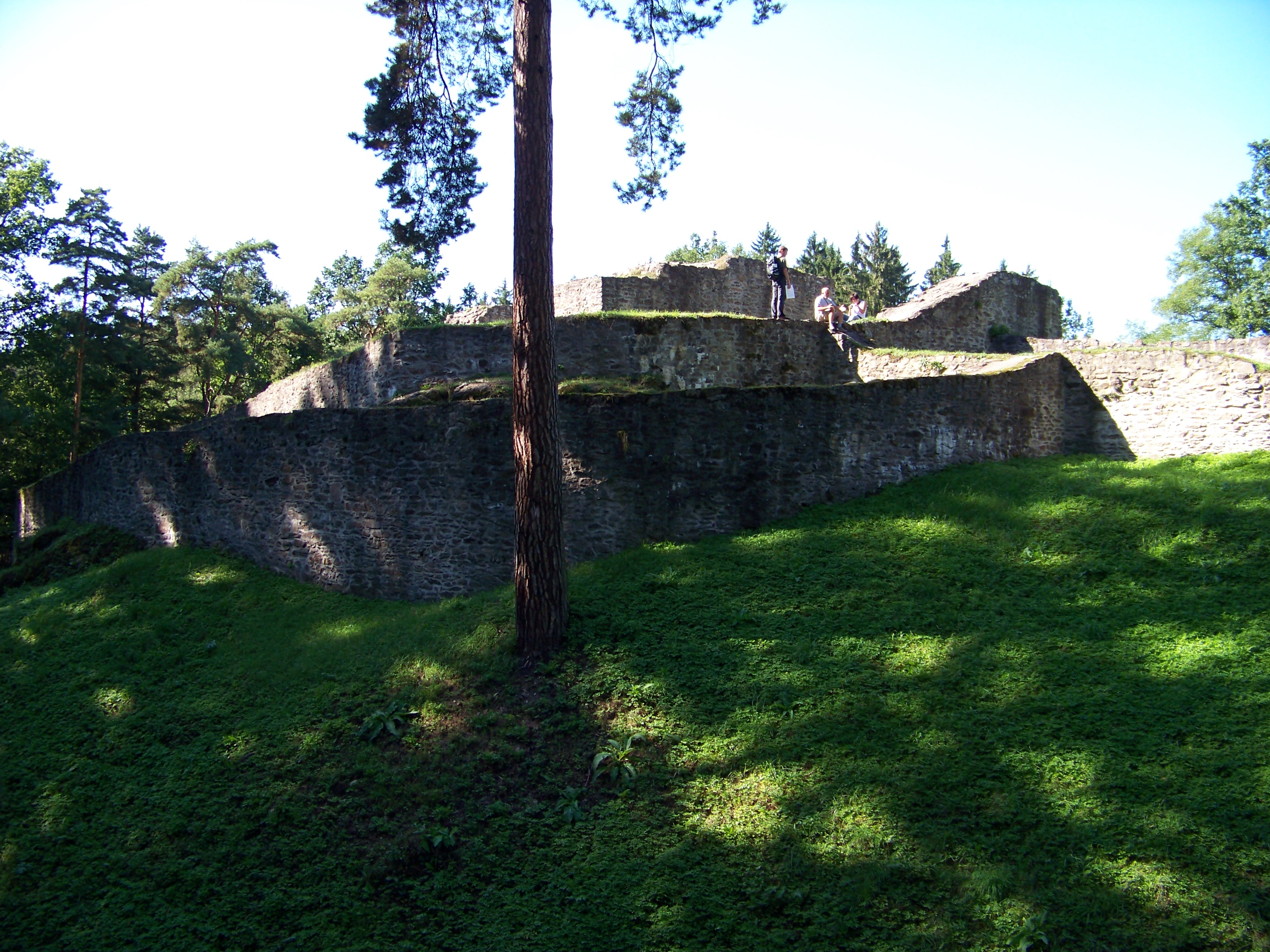
Ruined walls of the castle

The first efforts to uncover the castle began in 1886 when August Sedláček, a professor and historian from Tábor, organized the clearing of the ruins of the main residential tower.

In 1899, more systematic archaeological work was undertaken by Josef Švehla, a teacher and amateur archaeologist. Over several years, Švehla's excavations fully cleared the castle ruins, giving them their present appearance. His work unearthed over 250 archaeological artifacts that are now housed in the Hussite Museum in Tábor.

In 1925, to commemorate the 500th anniversary of the death of the Hussite general Jan Žižka, a memorial mound named the "Falcon Mound" (Sokolská mohyla) was erected just east of the castle near the ruined cellars of the former brewery. By 1929, the clearing of the castle area was completed, and the ruins were structurally conserved. Since 1991, the site has been owned by the town of Sezimovo Ústí and remains open to the public as a popular tourist attraction and site of national pilgrimage.

== Architecture ==
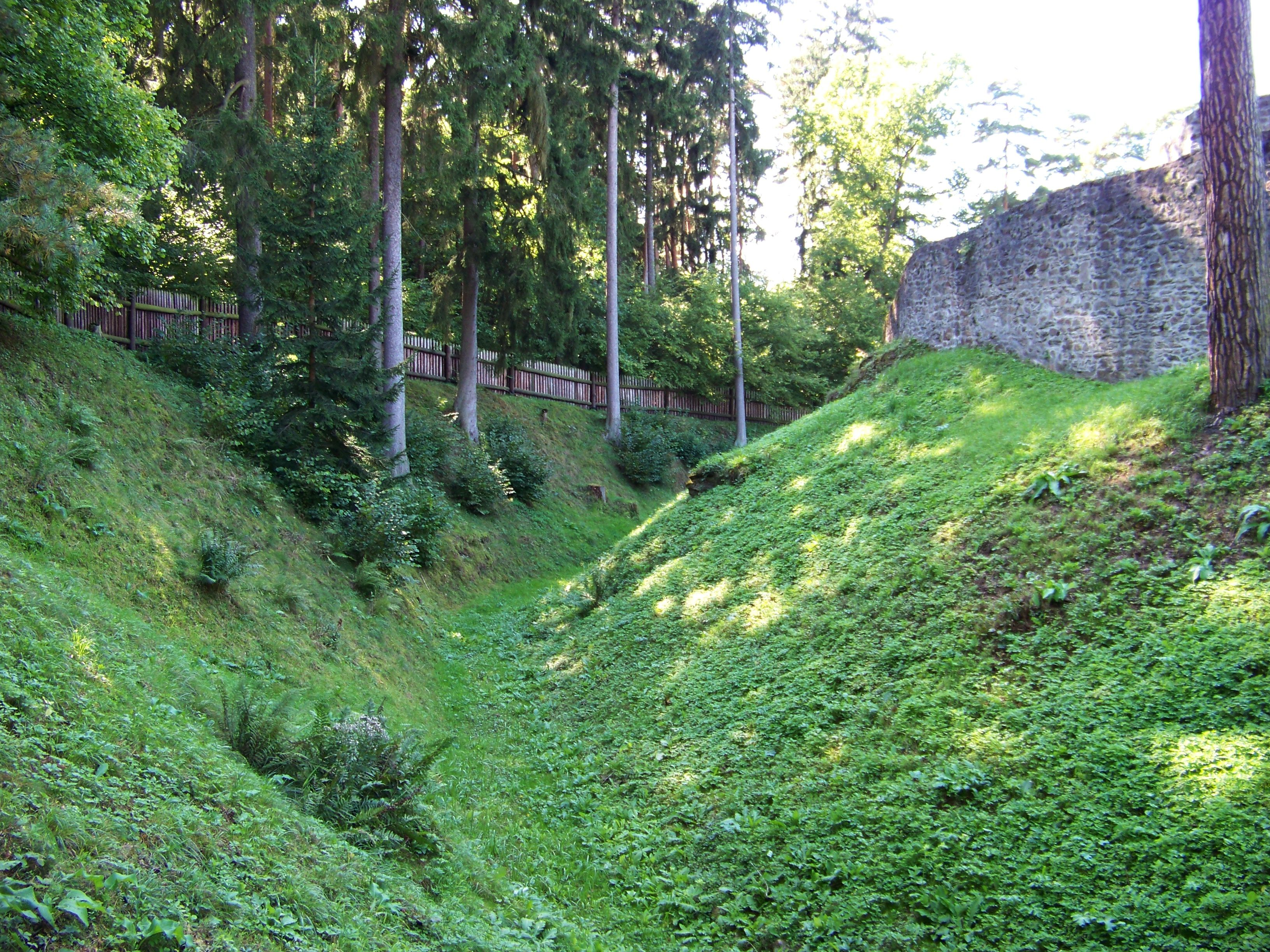
Deep water moat that originally protected the castle

Kozí hrádek was built on a narrow, oval-shaped promontory adjacent to a pond historically known as Jezero ('lake'). It is classified as a donjon-type castle, centered around a rectangular stone residential tower (donjon) that likely stood three stories high and served as the main residence of the castle's lords.

The castle was accessed from the east via a wooden bridge that spanned a deep ravine, ending in a drawbridge leading to the gate tower. The complex was surrounded by inner and outer defensive walls, featuring a zwinger (outer ward) and a deep water moat that reached up to 20 meters in width. The defenses were further strengthened by an earthen rampart topped with a massive wooden palisade. The castle's first courtyard contained the kitchen, the guardhouse, and an 18.5 m (61 ft)-deep well carved directly into the bedrock.

== Bibliography ==
- Cikhart, Roman (1935). Krajem božích bojovníků (PDF) (in Czech). Tábor.
- Hložek, Josef; Křivánek, Roman; Menšík, Petr (2011). "Kozí hrádek (okr. Tábor): předhradí, nebo hospodářské zázemí?" (PDF). Archaeologia Historica (in Czech). 36 (1). Masaryk University: 223–242.
