= Alois Wachsman =

Czech painter, stage designer and architect

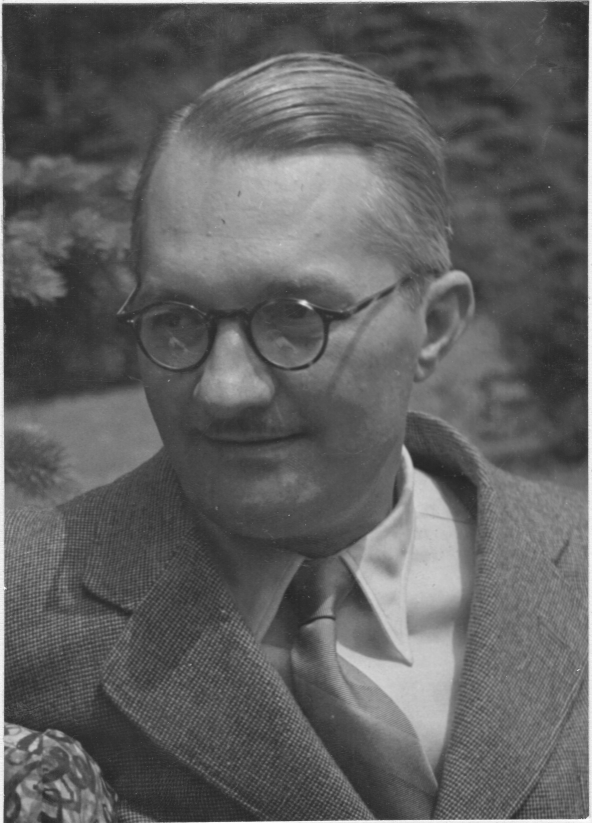
- Wachsman in 1942
- Born: 14 May 1898; Prague, Bohemia, Austria-Hungary
- Died: 16 May 1942 (aged 44); Jičín, Protectorate of Bohemia and Moravia
- Resting place: Olšany Cemetery, Prague
- Occupations: architect and painter

Alois Wachsman (14 May 1898 – 16 May 1942) was a Czech painter, stage designer and architect.

== Life ==
Wachsman was born on 14 May 1898 in Prague. He stems from an artist family. His granduncle was Bedřich Wachsmann and his cousin was Jiří Voskovec. From 1917 to 1922 he studied architecture at the Prague Technical University (CTU) and in 1920 was one of the founders of Devětsil. From 1925 to 1928 he studied architecture at the Academy of Fine Arts under Josef Gočár. From 1923, he was a member of the Association of Fine Artists, and from 1937 he lived in Dvůr Králové.

Wachsman died on 16 May 1942 in Jičín.

== Works ==
As a painter Wachsman was initially under the strong influence of French cubism, later, his paintings were close to surrealism, but with very distinctive poetic sentiments. At the end of his life he painted almost realistic paintings with religious themes, again with characteristic poetry. He also worked as an illustrator and theatrical architect for the Osvobozené divadlo and National Theatre. Between 1927 and 1930 he worked with Josef Gočár in the design of the Church of St. Wenceslas in Prague-Vršovice.

== See also ==
- List of Czech painters
