= St. Wenceslas Church (Vršovice) =

St Wenceslas Church
- Kostel sv. Václava ve Vršovicích
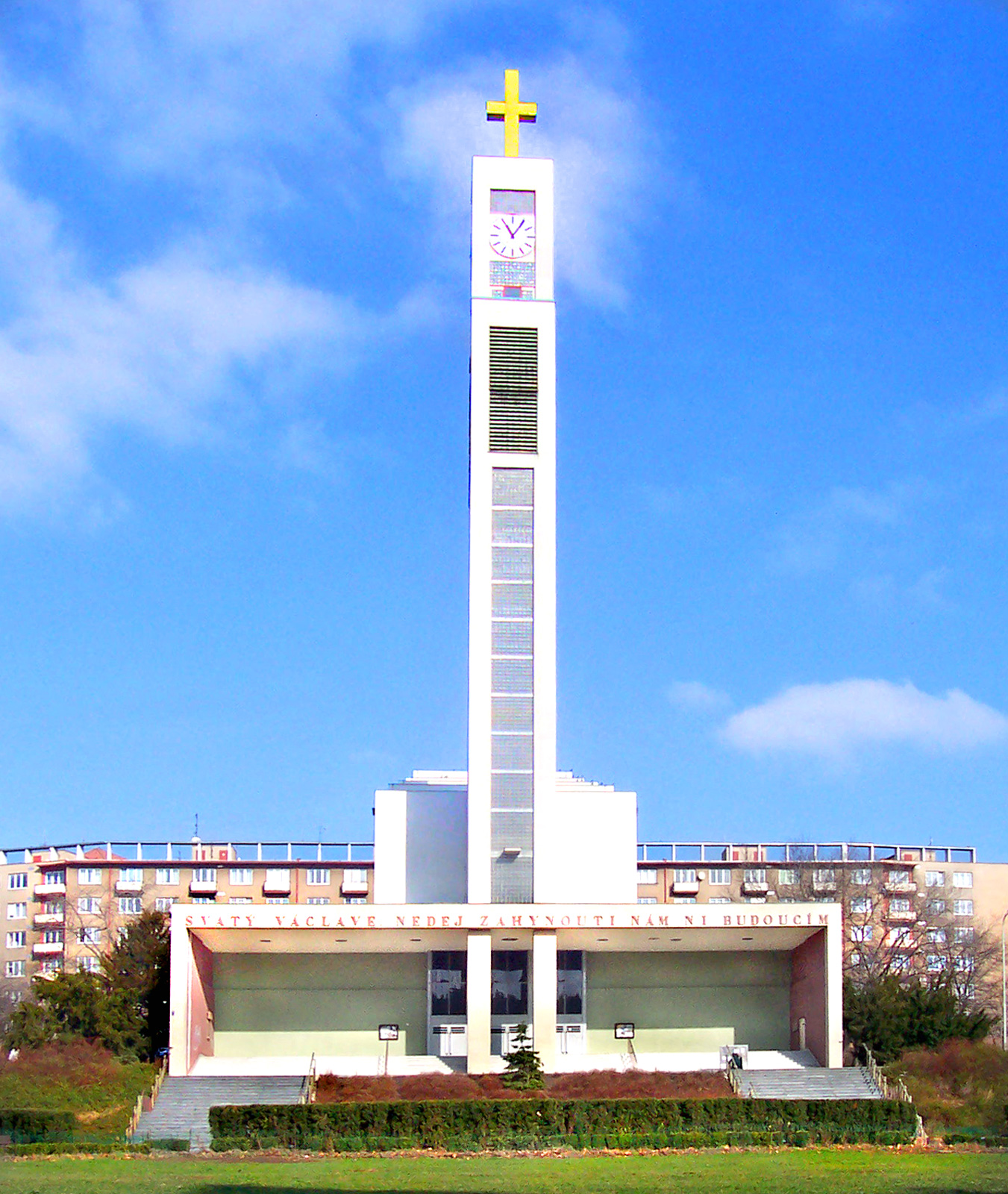
- The Church of Saint Wenceslas

- Location within Czech Republic
- 50°4′8″N 14°27′33″E
- Location: Prague
- Country: Czech Republic
- Denomination: Roman Catholic

History
- Status: Active
- Dedication: St Wenceslas

Architecture
- Functional status: Parish Church
- Architect: Josef Gočár
- Groundbreaking: 1929
- Completed: 1930

Specifications
- Height: 50 m (160 ft)

Administration
- Archdiocese: Prague
- Parish: Vršovice Prague

Clergy
- Archbishop: Dominik Duka
- Pastor: Stanisław Góra

The Church of Saint Wenceslas (Czech: Kostel sv. Václava) is a Roman Catholic church in Vršovice in Prague 10, Czech Republic. The church was built in 1930 as a commemoration of the 1,000th anniversary of the death of St. Wenceslas.

== Description ==
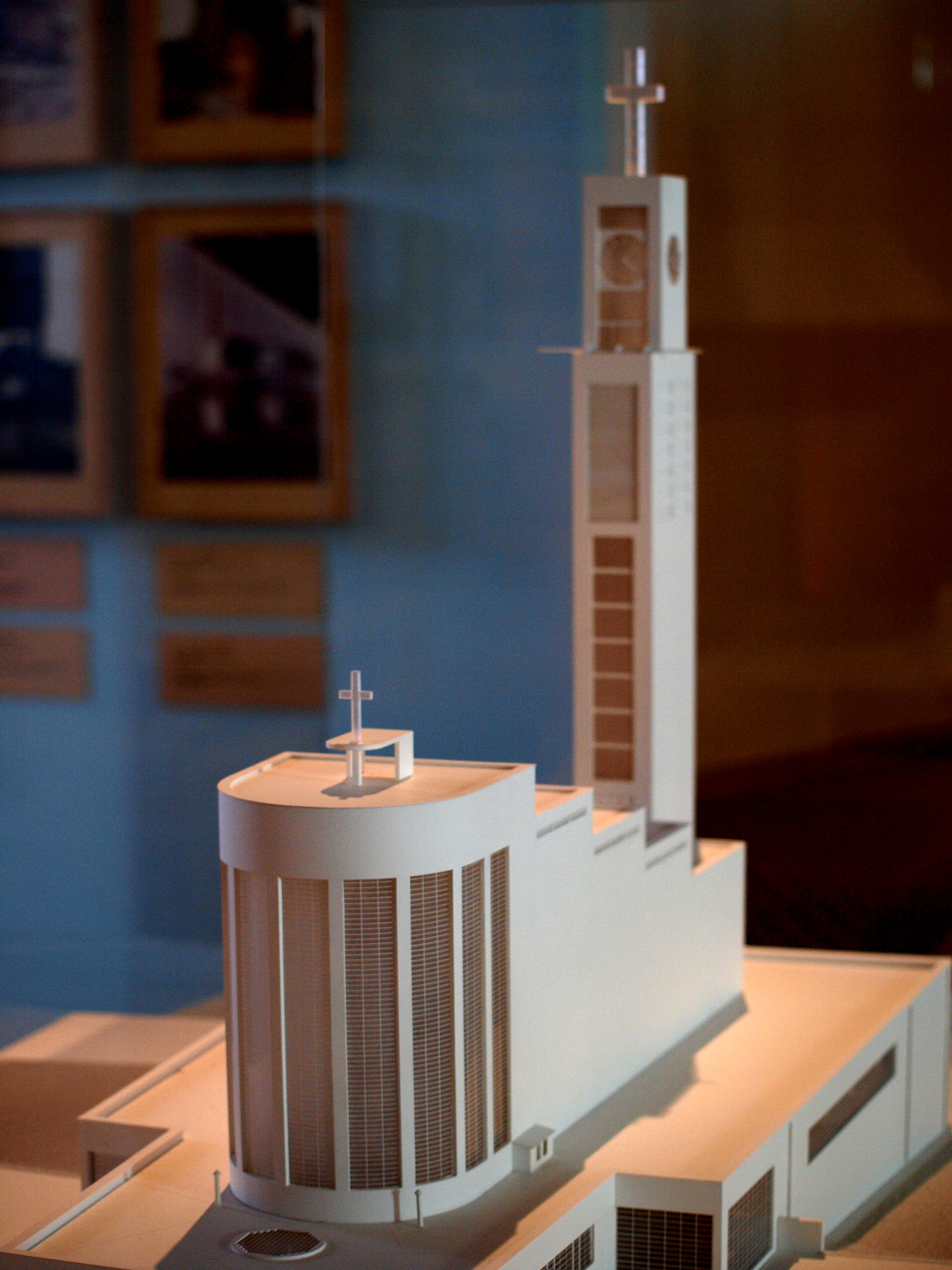
Model of the church by sculptor Jan Roith in the National Technical Museum (Prague)

This was one of three new buildings constructed in 1929 in Prague inspired by the 1000th anniversary of the death of St. Wenceslas. This is the Saint Wenceslas who features in the Christmas carol "Good King Wenceslas", which was based on a poem written by Václav Alois Svoboda The most expensive construction for Wenceslas's commemoration in Prague was the completion of the medieval cathedral, but the Catholic Church also decided to build two new churches. One church was to be built at Jiřího z Poděbrad - the Church of the Most Sacred Heart of Our Lord by Jože Plečnik and this one, which was to be built on a former cemetery in Svatopluk Čech square in Vršovice.

There was already a church in Vršovice dedicated to St. Nicholas whose history went back, via several buildings on the site, to the 11th century, but this was to be a new church. The idea of a new church had started in 1864 but the process was slow and it took until 1902 to establish a committee to create a new church for Vršovice.

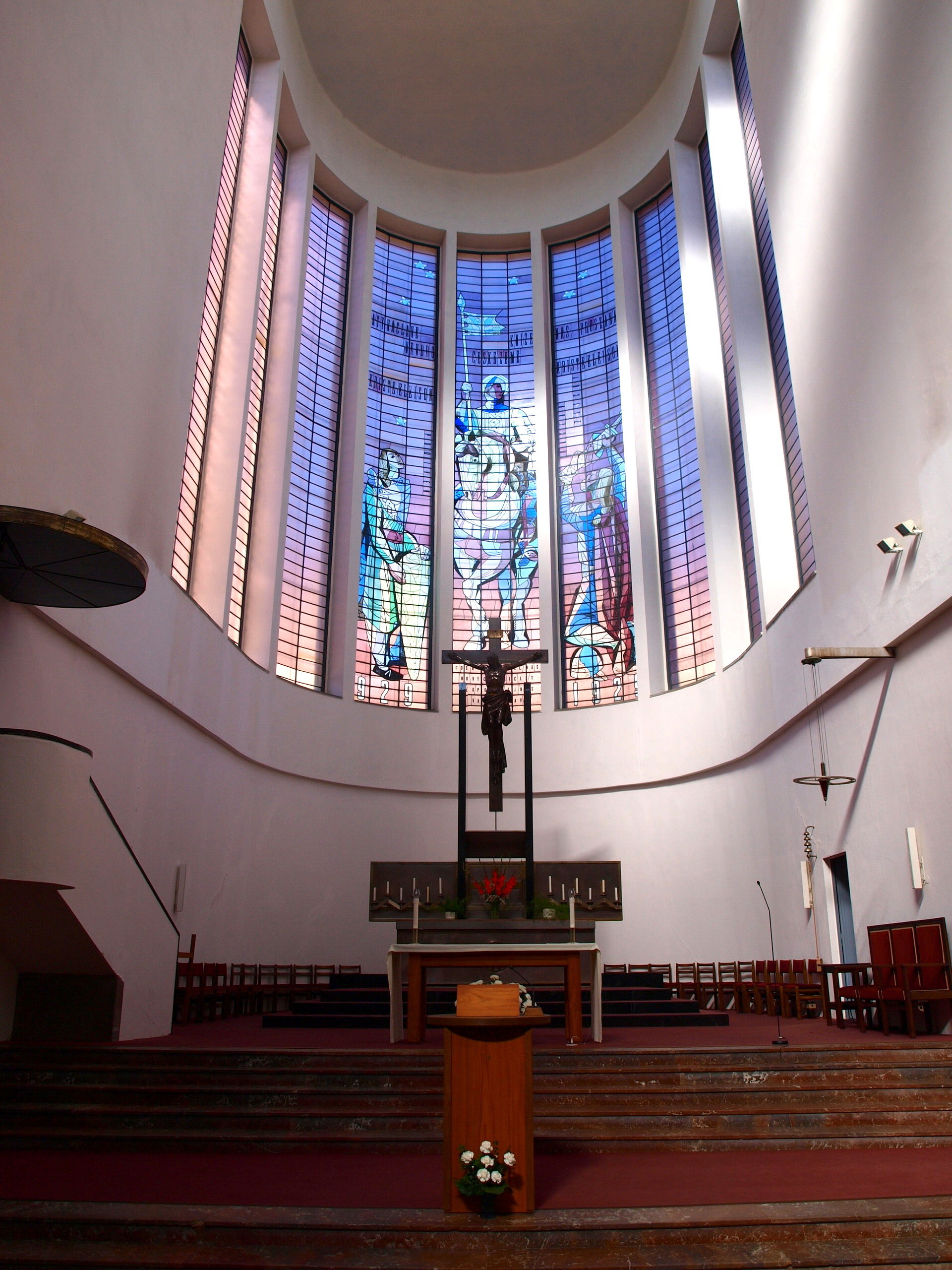
Interior of the church

The design of the new church was settled by competition with over 50 entries being short-listed to three. Czech architect Josef Gočár was the winner with a daring Constructivist design. The foundation stone was laid in May 1929 and the church was consecrated by Francis Kordac, the Archbishop of Prague on 21 September 1930. It is said that the overall plan was made by the architect to have a hall that led to the presbytery to cope with the sloping ground.

The building is dominated by the 50-metre tower with a large seven-metre cross as its top. The tower also incorporates a clock and it is possible to climb to this and the top just using a ladder. The tower has five bells and the cross at the top is lighted at night.

The windows in the church were replaced in 1998 during a refurbishment Up to that date the glass chosen was Luxfer glass which is a glass covered in small prisms which directed the light in the architect's desired direction.

The church was open in September 2012 as part of the European Heritage Days initiative.
