= Church of the Most Sacred Heart of Our Lord =

Roman Catholic church in Prague, Czech Republic

Coordinates: 50°4′40.92″N 14°27′02.18″E

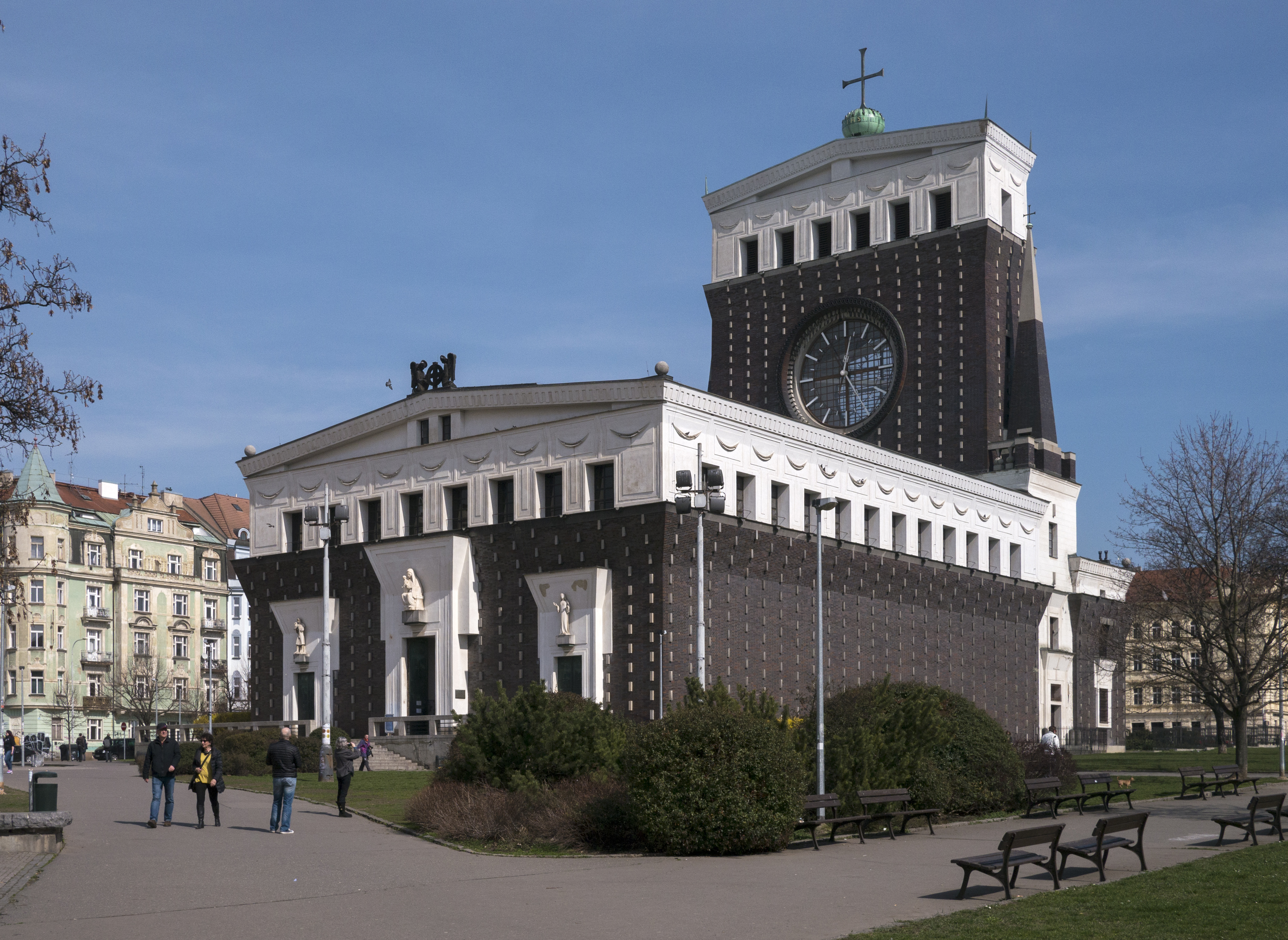
The Church of the Most Sacred Heart of Our Lord, Jiřího z Poděbrad

The Church of the Most Sacred Heart of Our Lord (Czech: Kostel Nejsvětějšího Srdce Páně) is a Roman Catholic church at Jiřího z Poděbrad Square in Prague's Vinohrady district. It was built between 1929 and 1932 and designed by the Slovene architect Jože Plečnik. Plečnik found the inspiration for this construction in old Christian and ancient patterns. The Czech sculptor Damian Pešan (1887–1975) created statues of Christ and six Czech patron saints above the main altar, and he also designed the liturgical vessels.

This was one of three new buildings constructed in 1929 in Prague, inspired by the 1000th anniversary of the death of St. Wenceslas. The most expensive construction for Wenceslas's commemoration in Prague was the completion of the medieval St. Vitus Cathedral, but the Catholic Church also decided to build two new churches. One church was to be built in Vršovice, Prague 10 – St. Wenceslas Church (Vršovice) by Czech architect Josef Gočár and this one, which was to be built at Jiřího z Poděbrad Square in Vinohrady.

It is considered one of the most significant Czech religious constructions of the 20th century. In the wide 42 m high tower wall is a huge, 7.6 m diameter glazed clock (the largest in the Czech Republic). In the basement is a spacious chapel with a wooden caisson ceiling. Inside is an altar made of white marble, a three-metre gilded figure of Christ, and six statues of the patrons of Bohemia.

During World War II, the six bells from the tower were melted down for arms production, and in 1992, two copies were returned. Since 2010, the church has been ranked among national cultural monuments.
