= Bedřich Wachsmann =

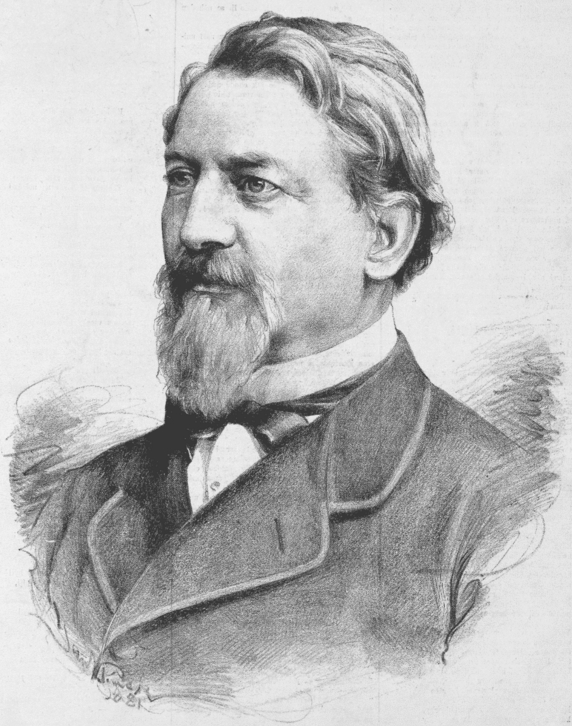
- Bedřich Wachsmann by Jan Vilímek (1881)
- Born: Friedrich Wachsmann; 24 May 1820; Litoměřice, Bohemia, Austrian Empire
- Died: 27 February 1897 (aged 76); Prague, Bohemia, Austria-Hungary
- Resting place: Olšany Cemetery
- Occupations: architect and painter

Bedřich Wachsmann (24 May 1820 – 27 February 1897) was a Czech painter, decorator and architect.

His grandnephews were Jiří Voskovec and Alois Wachsman.

He was born Friedrich Wachsmann and graduated from high school and lower secondary school in his native Litoměřice. In 1840 he went to the Leipzig Academy of Painting and later in Dresden and Prague. In addition to studies he began making stone portraits and miniatures. In 1848 he moved to Innsbruck, where he painted landscapes for some 18 months. His next place of work was Munich, where he became a noted figure on the local art scene and was then sought after as a teacher, achieving success at exhibitions in Salzburg, Linz, Vienna and Prague. He made a trip to the Tyrol and northern Italy.

In the autumn of 1854 he returned to Prague. He painted watercolors and oil paintings, ornaments and drew designs for monuments. He was responsible for the reconstruction of the Cross Chapel at Prague Castle, internal changes in the Romanesque style (1868–69), renovation of the chapel at Archbishop's residence in Prague, illustrations in journals such as Světozor (after 1867) and Zlatá Praha (after 1884), other artwork in magazines and travelogues and an encyclopedic guide to Bohemia.
