= Jiřího z Poděbrad Square =

Square in Prague, Czech Republic

- Public square
- {{{other_names}}}
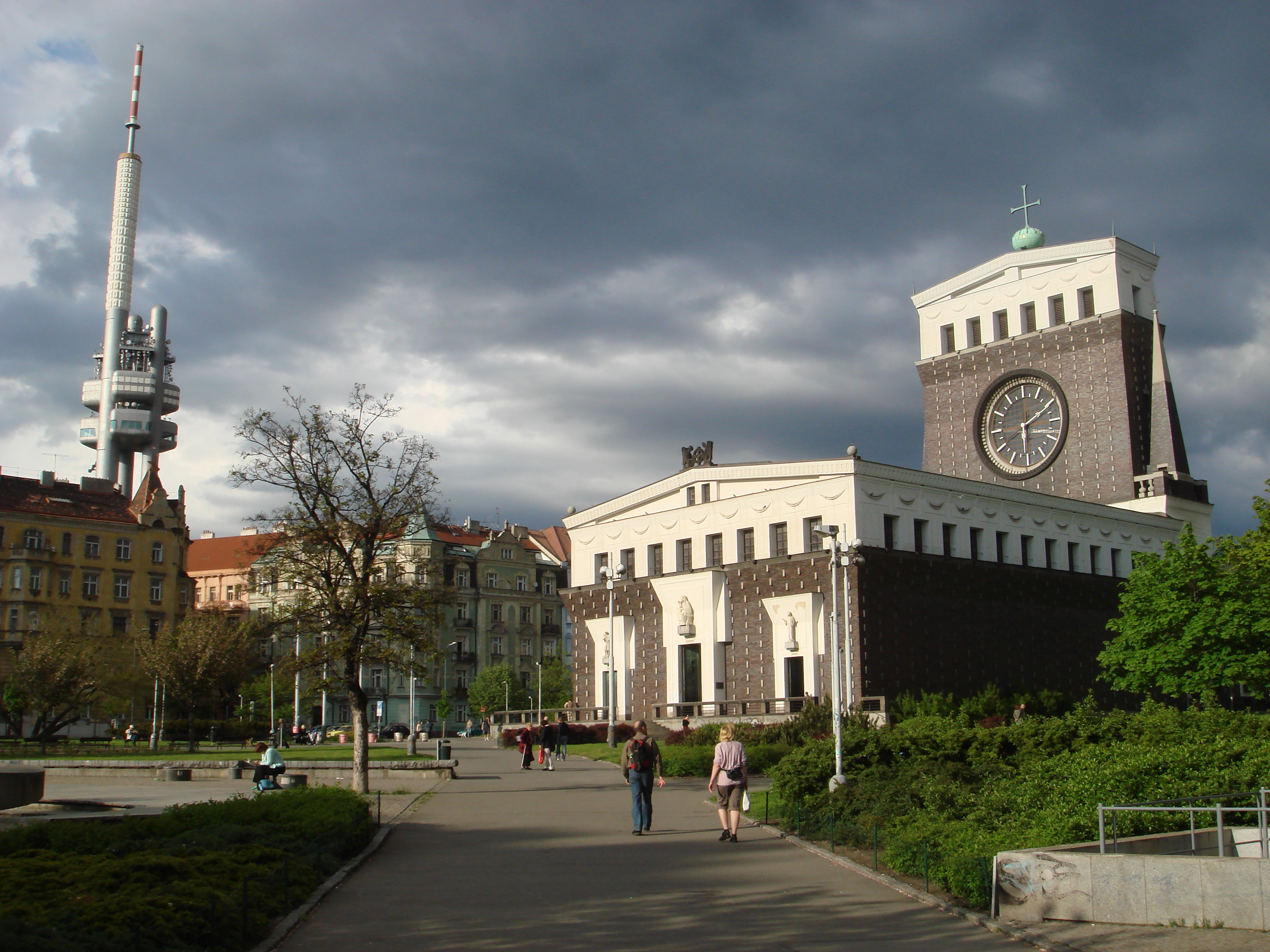
- Jiřího z Poděbrad Square and Church of the Most Sacred Heart of Our Lord, Žižkov Television Tower in the background
- Features: Church of the Most Sacred Heart of Our Lord; pedestrian zone; Jiřího z Poděbrad (Prague Metro)
- Opened: 1896
- Location: Prague, Czech Republic
- Interactive map of Jiřího z Poděbrad Square
- Coordinates: 50°04′41″N 14°27′01″E

Jiřího z Poděbrad Square (George of Poděbrady Square, Czech: náměstí Jiřího z Poděbrad) is located in the Vinohrady district of Prague, the capital of the Czech Republic. It is dominated by the 1932 Art Nouveau Church of the Most Sacred Heart of Our Lord in its centre. The square is largely an urban park. Its other features include a stone fountain. Metro and tram stops of the same are located on the square.

== History ==
Jiřího z Poděbrad Square was established in 1896 and was previously called King George Square (Náměstí krále Jiřího), by name of George of Poděbrady, who was a king of Bohemia from 1458 to 1471. The name of the square was changed to the current one in 1948.

On 17 June 2026, the reconstruction of the square after two-and-half years was completed, costing approximately CZK 471.1 million.

== See also ==
- Jiřího z Poděbrad (Prague Metro)
- Church of the Most Sacred Heart of Our Lord
