= Vikentiy Khvoyka =

Czech-Ukrainian archaeologist (1850–1914)

Vikentiy Viacheslavovych Khvoyka
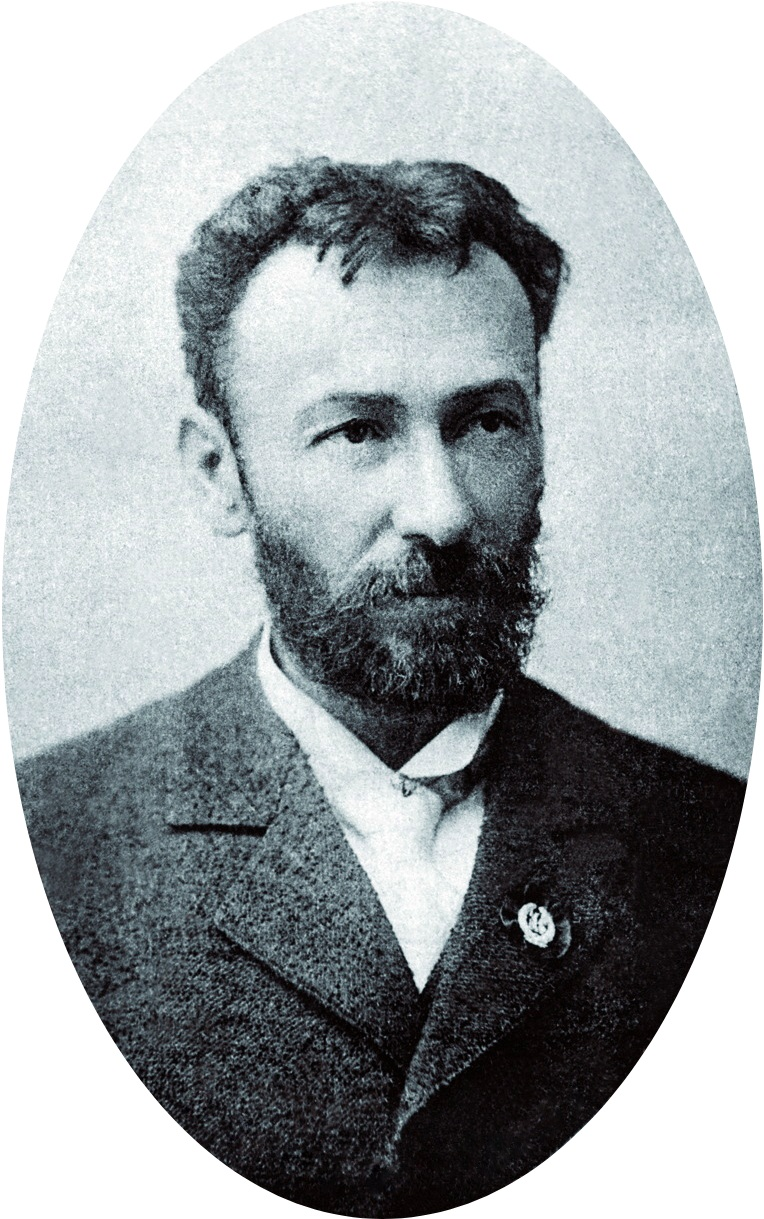
- Born: Čeněk Chvojka; 21 February 1850; Semín, Kingdom of Bohemia, Austrian Empire
- Died: 20 August 1914 (aged 64); Kyiv, Russian Empire
- Known for: Discovery of the Trypillian culture
- Scientific career
- Fields: Archaeology

Vikentiy Viacheslavovych Khvoyka (Ukrainian: Вікентій В'ячеславович Хвойка; Russian: Викентий Вячеславович Хвойка; Czech: Vincenc Častoslav Chvojka; born Čeněk Chvojka; 21 February 1850 – 20 August 1914) was a Czech-born Ukrainian archaeologist. He discovered the Neolithic Trypillia culture of Ukraine and also researched the Scythian, Zarubintsy, Chernyakhov and early Slavic archaeological cultures.

== Biography ==
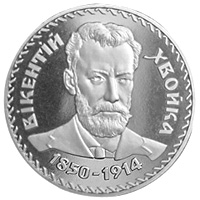
Commemorative coin issued on the 150th anniversary of Khvoyka's birth

Khvoyka was born Čeněk Chvojka on 21 February 1850 in the village of Semín in the Kingdom of Bohemia (then part of the Austrian Empire). After graduating from the Academy of Commerce in Chrudim, he lived in Prague for a time before emigrating to the Russian Empire. From 1876, he lived in Kyiv and worked as a teacher. He turned his attention to archaeology in the 1890s and excavated around Kyiv and the Dnieper region. He was one of the founders of Kyiv's Museum of Antiquities and Art, now the National Historical Museum, and the first curator of its archaeological collection.

Khvoyka discovered the Trypillia culture in Ukraine. The exact year of his discovery is uncertain: 1893, 1896 and 1887 have been reported. He presented his findings at the 11th Congress of Archaeologists in 1897. The same culture was discovered in Romania around the same time, where it was called the Cucuteni culture.

Khvoyka died in Kyiv on 20 October 1914. He is buried in the Baikove Cemetery.

== Legacy ==
In 1962, Novokyrylivska Street in Kyiv, where Khvoyka lived from 1898 to his death in 1914, was renamed in his honour, and a memorial plaque was installed there.

In 2000, the National Bank of Ukraine issued a commemorative two hryvnia coin to mark the 150th anniversary of Khvoyka's birth.
