= Libodřice =

- Municipality
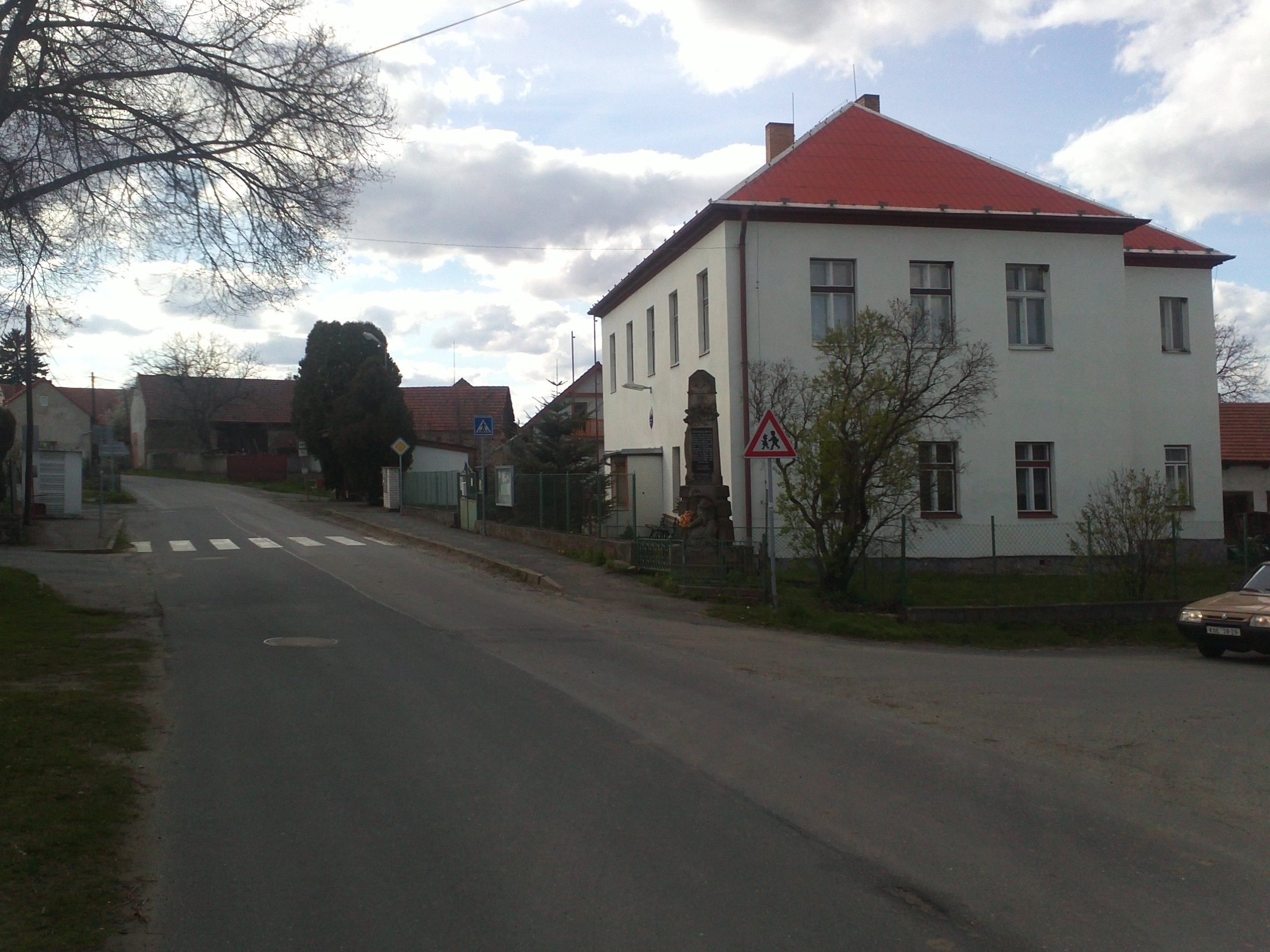
- Municipal office

- Location in the Czech Republic
- Coordinates: 50°0′16″N 15°5′18″E
- Country: Czech Republic
- Region: Central Bohemian
- District: Kolín
- First mentioned: 1266

Area
  - Total: 5.92 km^{2} (2.29 sq mi)
- Elevation: 272 m (892 ft)

Population (2026-01-01)
  - Total: 316
  - Density: 53.4/km^{2} (138/sq mi)
- Time zone: UTC+1 (CET)
  - Summer (DST): UTC+2 (CEST)
- Postal code: 280 02
- Website: www.obeclibodrice.cz

Libodřice is a municipality and village in Kolín District in the Central Bohemian Region of the Czech Republic. It has about 300 inhabitants.

== Etymology ==
The name is derived from the personal name Liboder, meaning "the village of Liboder's people".

== Geography ==
Libodřice is located about 8 kilometres (5 mi) west of Kolín and 40 km (25 mi) east of Prague. It lies in the Upper Sázava Hills, only a small part of the municipal territory in the west extends into the Central Elbe Table. The highest point is at 346 m (1,135 ft) above sea level. The Blinka Stream flows through the municipality.

== History ==
The first written mention of Libodřice is from 1266. It was owned by a local noble family who called themselves the Lords of Libodřice. After 1650, the owners of Libodřice changed frequently.

== Demographics ==
Historical population

Year	Pop.	±%
1869	594	—
1880	691	+16.3%
1890	666	−3.6%
1900	583	−12.5%
1910	598	+2.6%

Year	Pop.	±%
1921	600	+0.3%
1930	521	−13.2%
1950	395	−24.2%
1961	344	−12.9%
1970	288	−16.3%

Year	Pop.	±%
1980	278	−3.5%
1991	253	−9.0%
2001	274	+8.3%
2011	306	+11.7%
2021	292	−4.6%

Source: Censuses

== Economy ==
There is a quarry on the southwestern edge of the municipality. Amphibolite is extracted there.

== Transport ==
There are no railways or major roads passing through the municipality.

== Sights ==
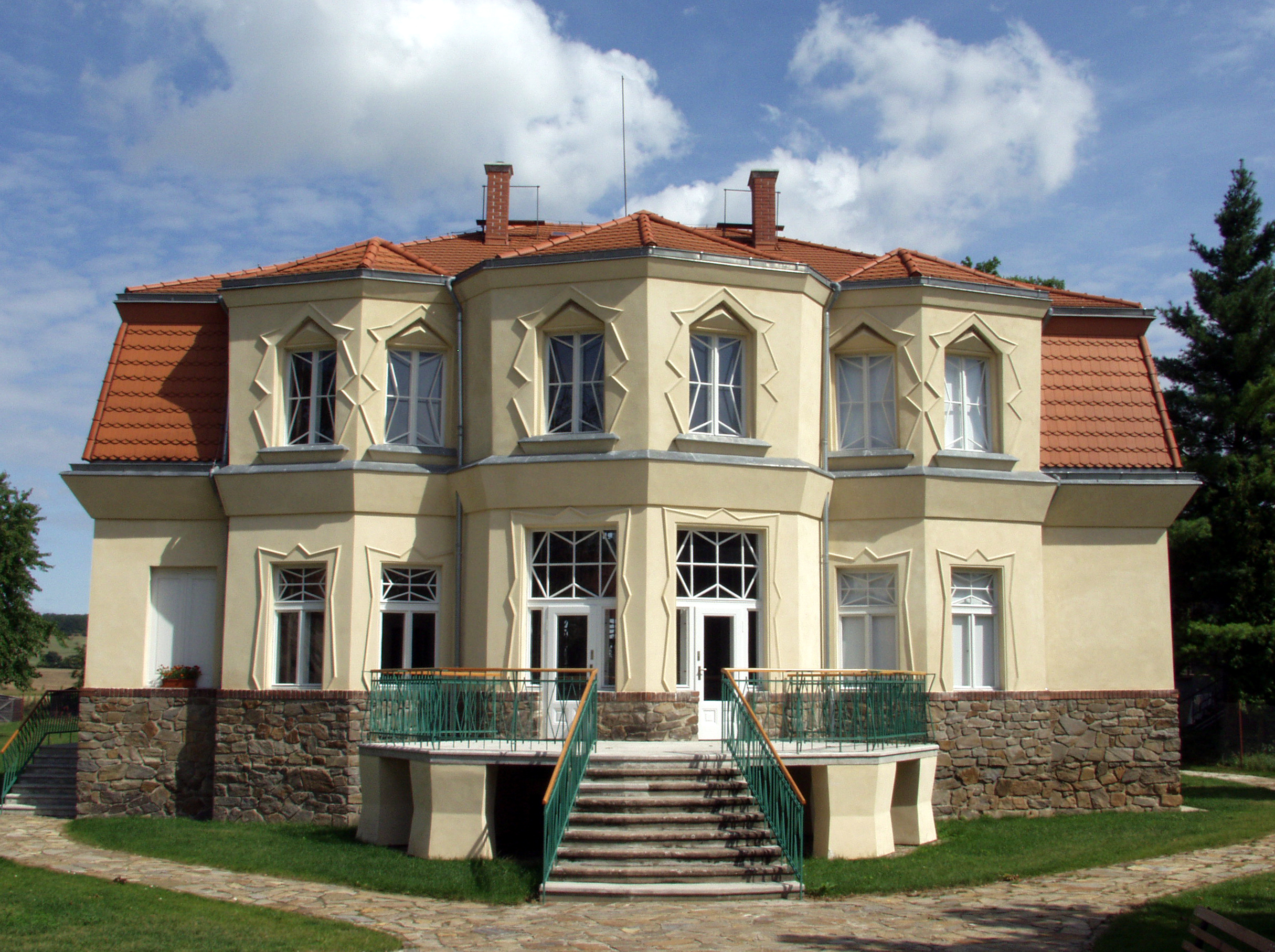
Bauer's Villa

The most important monument, protected as an archaeological monument reservation, are Libodřice tumuli. It is a mound burial site from the Late Bronze Age. It is proof of the spread of the Lusatian culture from the East Bohemian region to the left bank of the Elbe in the Kolín region. Today, there are a total of 20–25 exceptionally well-preserved barrows, up to 1.5 metres high with a diameter at the base ranging from 5 to 15 metres. The archaeological findings were placed in the Regional Museum in Kolín and its branch in Kouřim.

Bauer's Villa is a villa built by the architect Josef Gočár in 1912–1913 for the landowner Adolf Bauer. It is an architecturally valuable cubist building. Today the villa is owned by the municipality and used to be open to the public. The villa houses the largest collection of Cubist ceramics in the world. The dominant feature of the garden is a romantic replica of a cubist gazebo.

The Libodřice Castle was built in 1750 by reconstruction of a local fortress. It was the centre of administration until 1923. Then it was converted into a farm building and after 1950 into apartments and offices, and lost its historical value. Today it is privately owned.
