= Jiřího z Poděbrad (Prague Metro) =

Prague metro station

Coordinates: 50°4′40.189″N 14°27′1.062″E

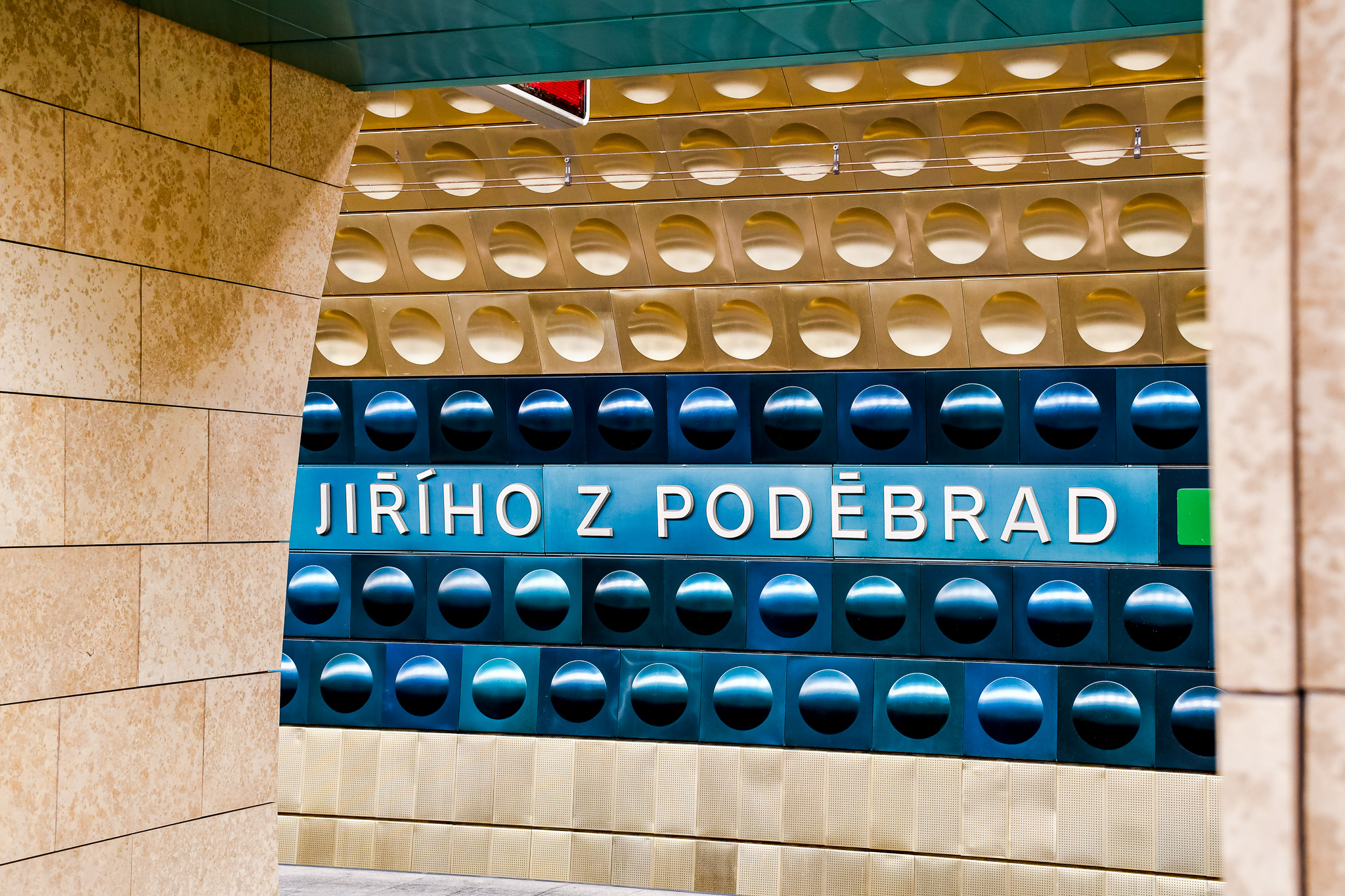

General information
- Location: Jiřího z Poděbrad Square; Vinohrady, Prague 3 Prague; Czech Republic
- System: Prague Metro
- Platforms: 1 island platform
- Tracks: 2

Construction
- Structure type: Underground
- Depth: 45 m (148 ft)

History
- Opened: 19 December 1980; 45 years ago

Services
Preceding station	Prague Metro	Following station
Náměstí Míru toward Nemocnice Motol	Line A	Flora toward Depo Hostivař
Location

Jiřího z Poděbrad (Czech pronunciation: [ˈjɪr̝iːɦo ˈspoɟɛbrat]) is a Prague Metro station on Line A, located in Vinohrady, Prague 3. In January 2023 it closed for reconstruction.

== General information ==
The station was named after the eponymous square it lies under, which was named after George of Poděbrady. Jiřího z Poděbrad is an underground trispan station. The main materials used on walls and ceilings are anodized aluminium, marble and granite. The only exit leads to an underground vestibule, which is connected with the platform by escalator tunnel. The station was opened on 19 December 1980 as part of the extension of the line between Náměstí Míru and Želivského.

In January 2023 the station closed to undergo a year-long reconstruction, with trains passing through without stopping. The reconstruction involved replacing the escalators and installing new lifts for step-free access. The station reopened in November 2023.

== In popular culture ==
At the beginning of the Radiohead song "A Reminder," the female voice of the Metro's automated announcement system can be heard announcing this station. It is also used in the song "Mind the Gap" by Calexico.

== Gallery ==
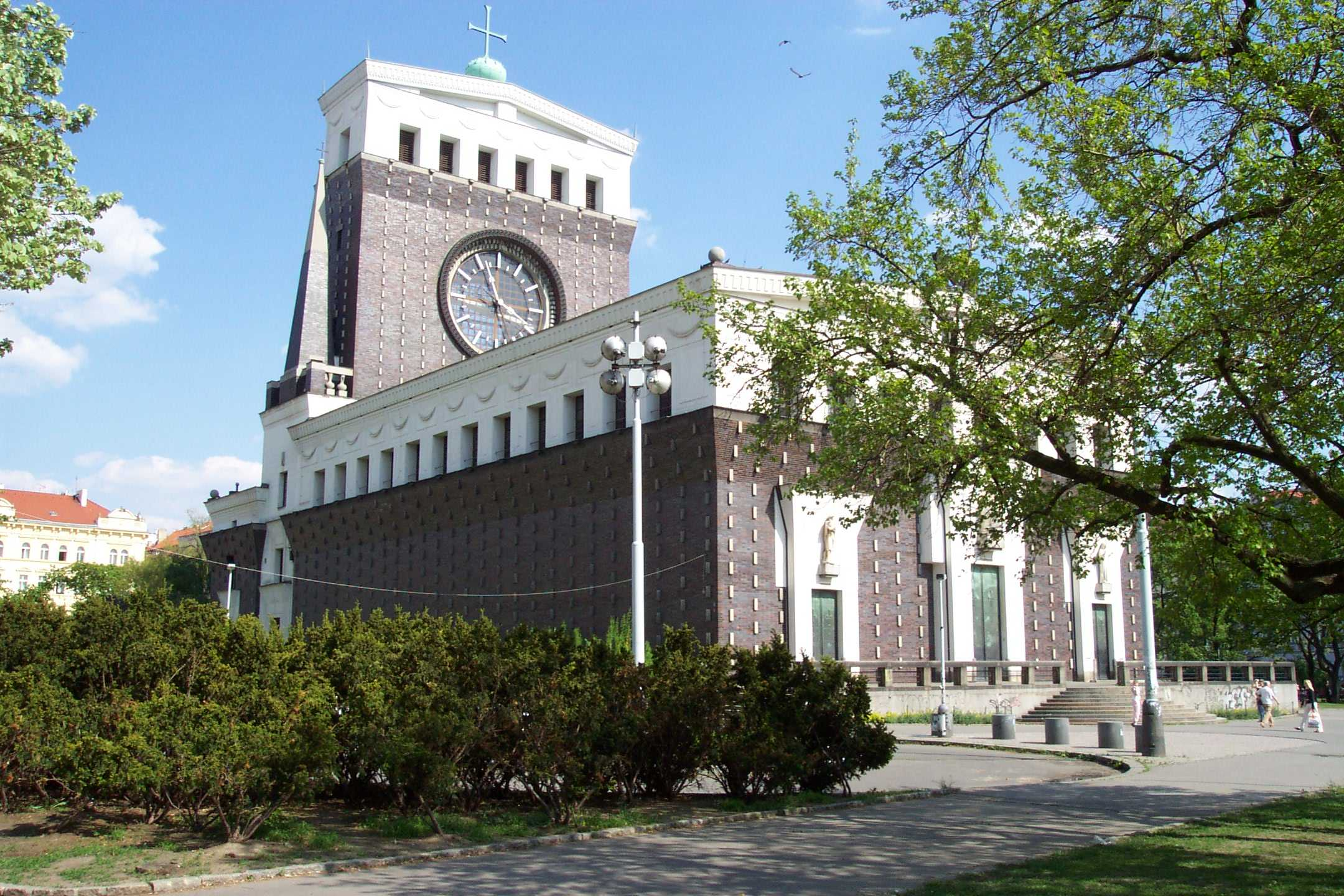
Jiřího z Poděbrad, the square above the metro station with Church of the Most Sacred Heart of Our Lord

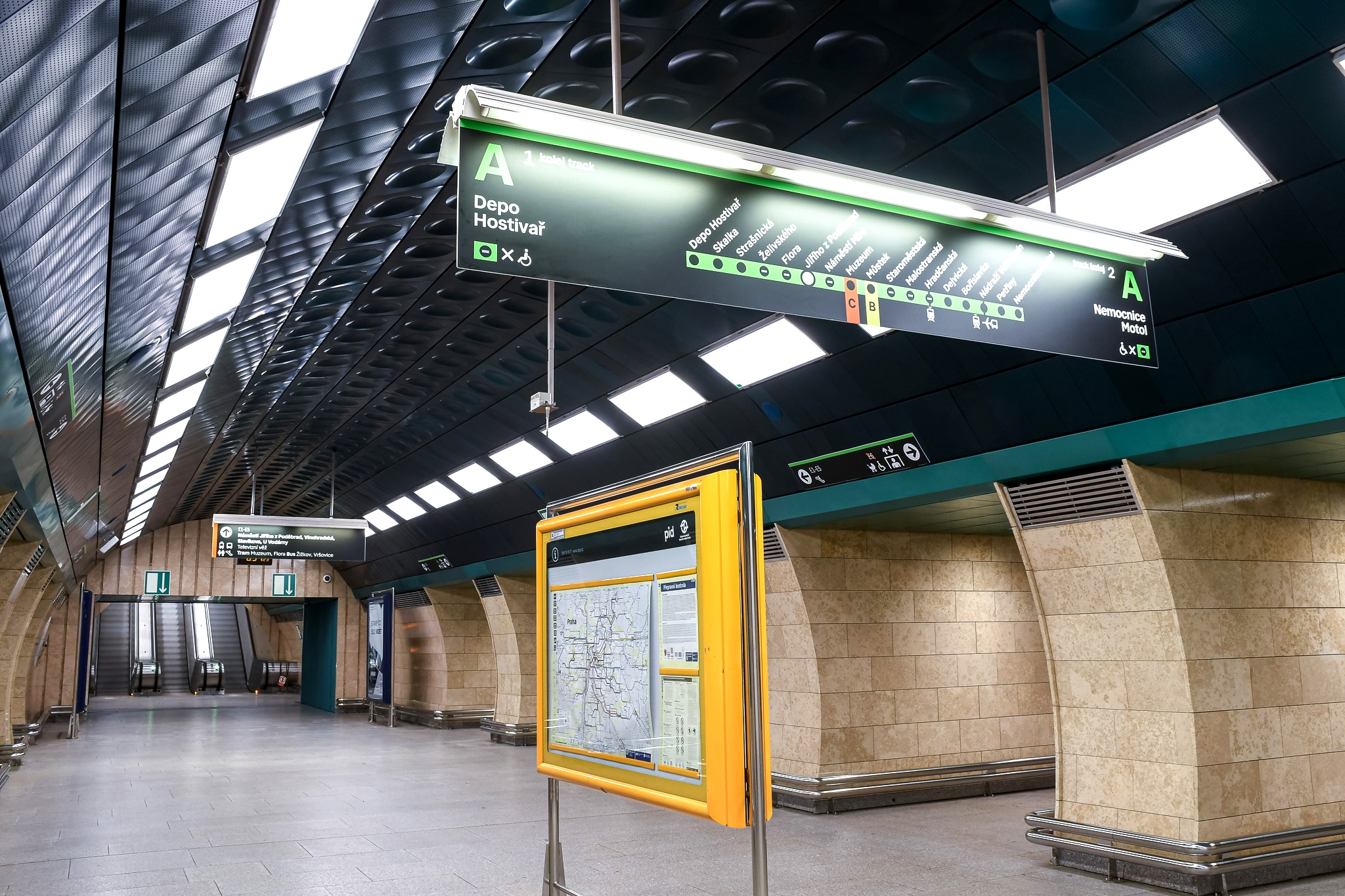
Station platforms

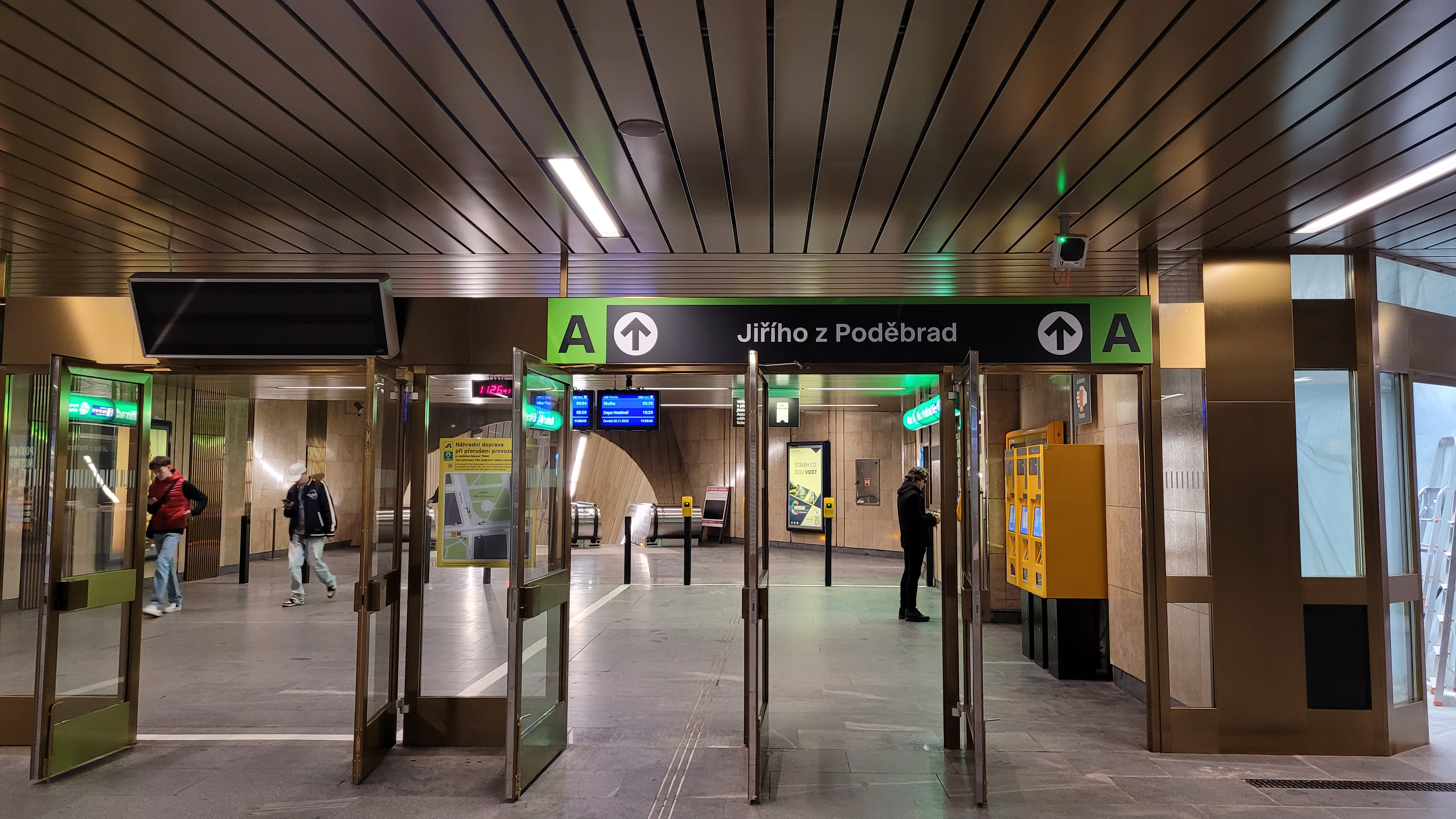
Station vestibule
