= Semín =

- Municipality
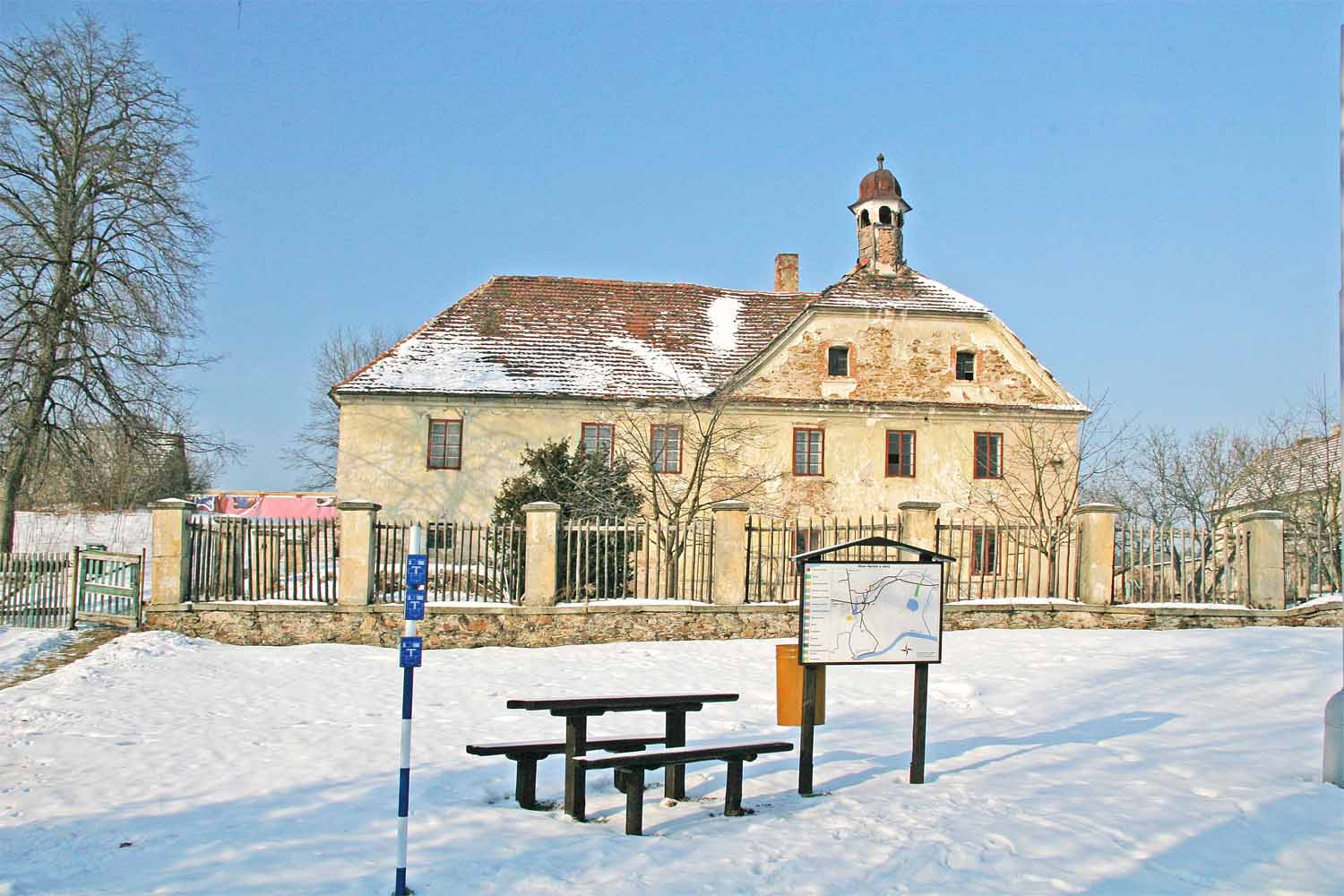
- Former Baroque castle

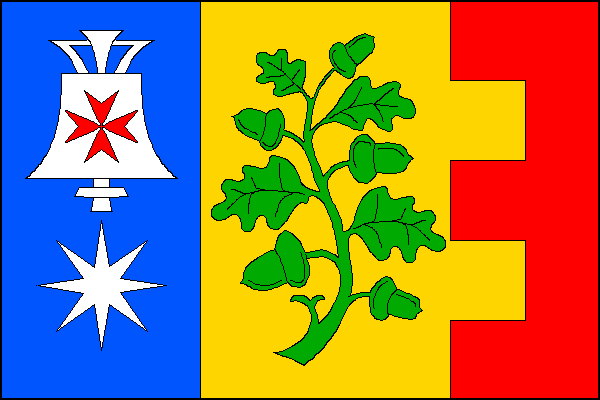
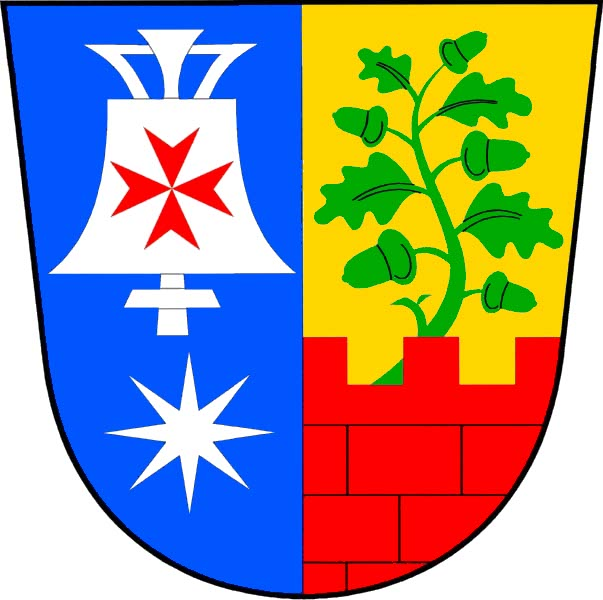
- Flag Coat of arms

- Location in the Czech Republic
- Coordinates: 50°3′11″N 15°31′11″E
- Country: Czech Republic
- Region: Pardubice
- District: Pardubice
- First mentioned: 1339

Area
  - Total: 7.43 km^{2} (2.87 sq mi)
- Elevation: 209 m (686 ft)

Population (2026-01-01)
  - Total: 641
  - Density: 86.3/km^{2} (223/sq mi)
- Time zone: UTC+1 (CET)
  - Summer (DST): UTC+2 (CEST)
- Postal code: 535 01
- Website: www.seminuprelouce.cz

Semín is a municipality and village in Pardubice District in the Pardubice Region of the Czech Republic. It has about 600 inhabitants.

== Demographics ==
Historical population
Year	Pop.	±%
1869	721	—
1880	785	+8.9%
1890	867	+10.4%
1900	826	−4.7%
1910	787	−4.7%
1921	768	−2.4%
1930	763	−0.7%
1950	656	−14.0%
1961	712	+8.5%
1970	682	−4.2%
1980	611	−10.4%
1991	521	−14.7%
2001	527	+1.2%
2011	511	−3.0%
2021	594	+16.2%
Source: Censuses

== Notable people ==
- Vikentiy Khvoyka (1850–1914), Ukrainian archaeologist
- Josef Gočár (1880–1945), architect
