= St. Nicholas Church (Vršovice) =

St Nicholas Church
- Kostel svatého Mikuláše
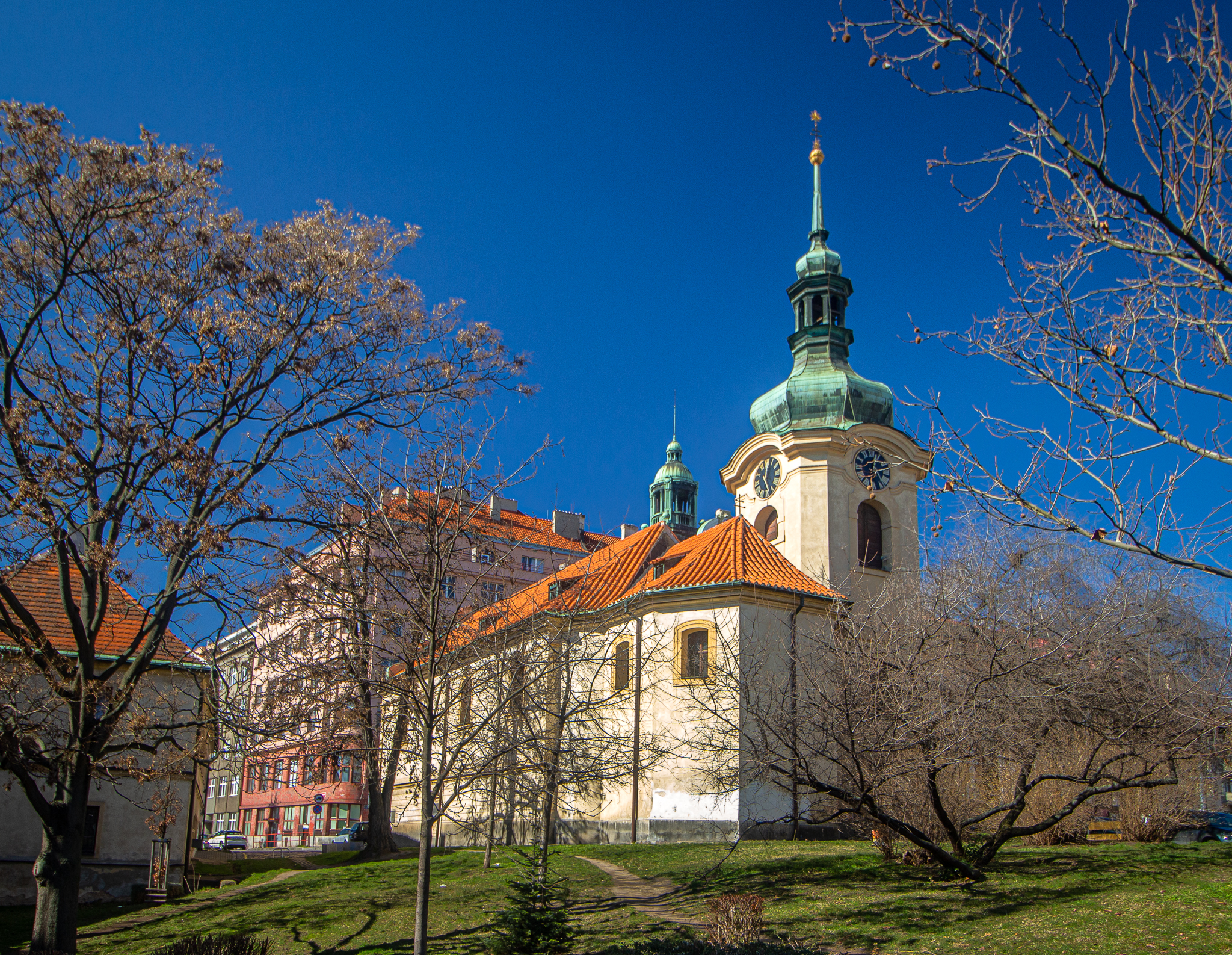
- The Church of Saint Nicholas
- St Nicholas Church
- 50°04′10″N 14°27′07″E
- Location: Prague
- Country: Czech Republic
- Denomination: Roman Catholic

History
- Status: Active

Architecture
- Functional status: Parish Church
- Completed: 1704

Specifications
- Height: 22 metres

Administration
- Archdiocese: Prague
- Parish: Vršovice Prague

The Church of Saint Nicholas (Czech: Kostel svatého Mikuláše) is a church in Vršovice in Prague 10. There has been a church here since at least the 11th century, although this building with its neo-gothic façade was built in the 18th and 19th centuries.

== Description ==
This understated church is, at least, the third religious building on this site. The first Christian church here was dedicated to Mary Magdalene in the 11th century. The first church here was built here in 1422, although there may have been a religious building here since the Romans. The church building was dedicated to St. Nicholas but it was not the last. There are today three churches dedicated to St. Nicholas in Prague.

The previous Gothic building was replaced in 1704 by a design which proved to be too small for the growing population; it was expanded and a façade by Bohumil Holeček was added in the 1890s. By this time the burial ground around the church was abandoned. This is the church you see today. The large eight sided chalice sculpture and filial rises almost 28 metres (92 ft). It is above the onion dome and the tower which rises from the presbytery.

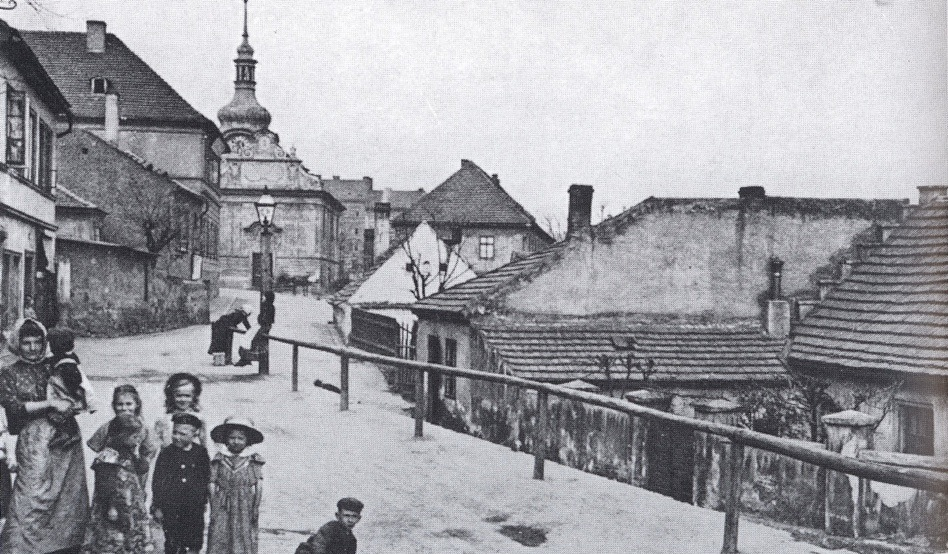
View through Šafaříkova street near the church in 1910

The 19th century organ confessionals remain. The only substantive changes made since the 1890s were the replacement of the main staircase and the removal of one of the two bells which was confiscated during the second world war. The remaining large 300 kg bell is dated 1511 and it was made by the popular bell founder "Bartoloměj of Prague". Another smaller 35 kg bell was added just under the main dome in 1923 which is used as a death knell. The bell is by Oktáv Winter.

The astronomical tower clock has a moon dial on its west face that shows the lunar phases and the position of Venus ("the evening star") in the evening sky. It is said to have cost 600 gold coins when the Vršovice council bought it in 1866 from Jan Prokeš in Sobotka.

There is a statue of the priest St. John of Nepomuk on the north wall. He was tortured to death in 1393 at the behest of Wenceslaus IV of Bohemia reputedly because he refused to tell the queen's secrets that had been told to him within the confessionals. Under the statue it says that the town is dedicated to this saint.

The church was renovated in 1973 and in 1988 the icon of St. Nicholas was stolen. A replacement was purchased in 2001 from Václav Rad.

This building was opened to the public in September 2012 as part of the European Heritage Days initiative.
