= Josef Gočár =

Czech architect, urbanist and university educator

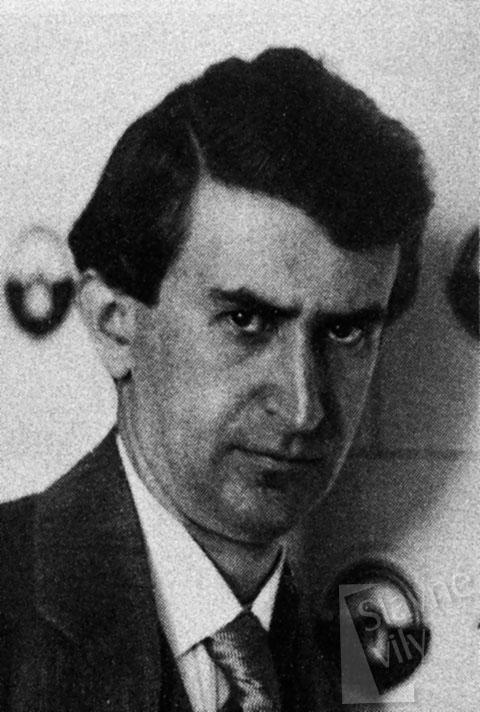
Josef Gočár

Josef Gočár (13 March 1880 in Semín – 10 September 1945 in Jičín) was a Czech architect. He was one of the founders of modern architecture in the Czech Republic.

== Life ==
Josef Gočár received his early instruction at the State Technical School in Prague. At the age of 23 he went to study under Jan Kotěra at the School of Applied Arts in Prague (UPŠ). For two years afterward, 1906–1908, Gočár was employed by Kotěra's studio. At that time he decided to join the Mánes Union of Fine Arts, but left it in 1911 to join the Cubist Group of Visual Artists. Gočár joined Pavel Janák, Josef Chochol and Odolen Grégr in founding the Prague Art Workshops in 1912. In 1924, following the death of Kotěra, Gočár became a professor at the Prague Academy of Fine Arts.

After his involvement in cubism, Gočár turned to "national" Czech Rondocubism style in the early 1920s. Later on he adopted the Functionalist approach to architecture. Among his greatest accomplishments is the Czechoslovak Pavilion for the 1925 Exposition internationale des arts décoratifs et industriels modernes in Paris, where he was awarded the Grand Prize for that design. In 1926 Gočár was awarded the Ordre de la Légion d'honneur.

== Works ==
- Wenke Department Store, Jaroměř, (1909–1911)
- House of the Black Madonna, Prague's Old Town (1911–1912)
- Bauer villa, Libodřice, (1912–1913)
- Remodeling of the head office of Anglo-Czechoslovak Bank in Prague and new branch buildings in Hradec Králové, Ostrava and Pardubice
- Dům Zemědělské osvěty, Vinohrady, Prague, 1924–1926
- Saint Wenceslas Church, Vršovice, Prague, 1929–1930
- A 10-year period of town planning and building design for Hradec Králové where a large street still bears his name today.

== Gallery ==
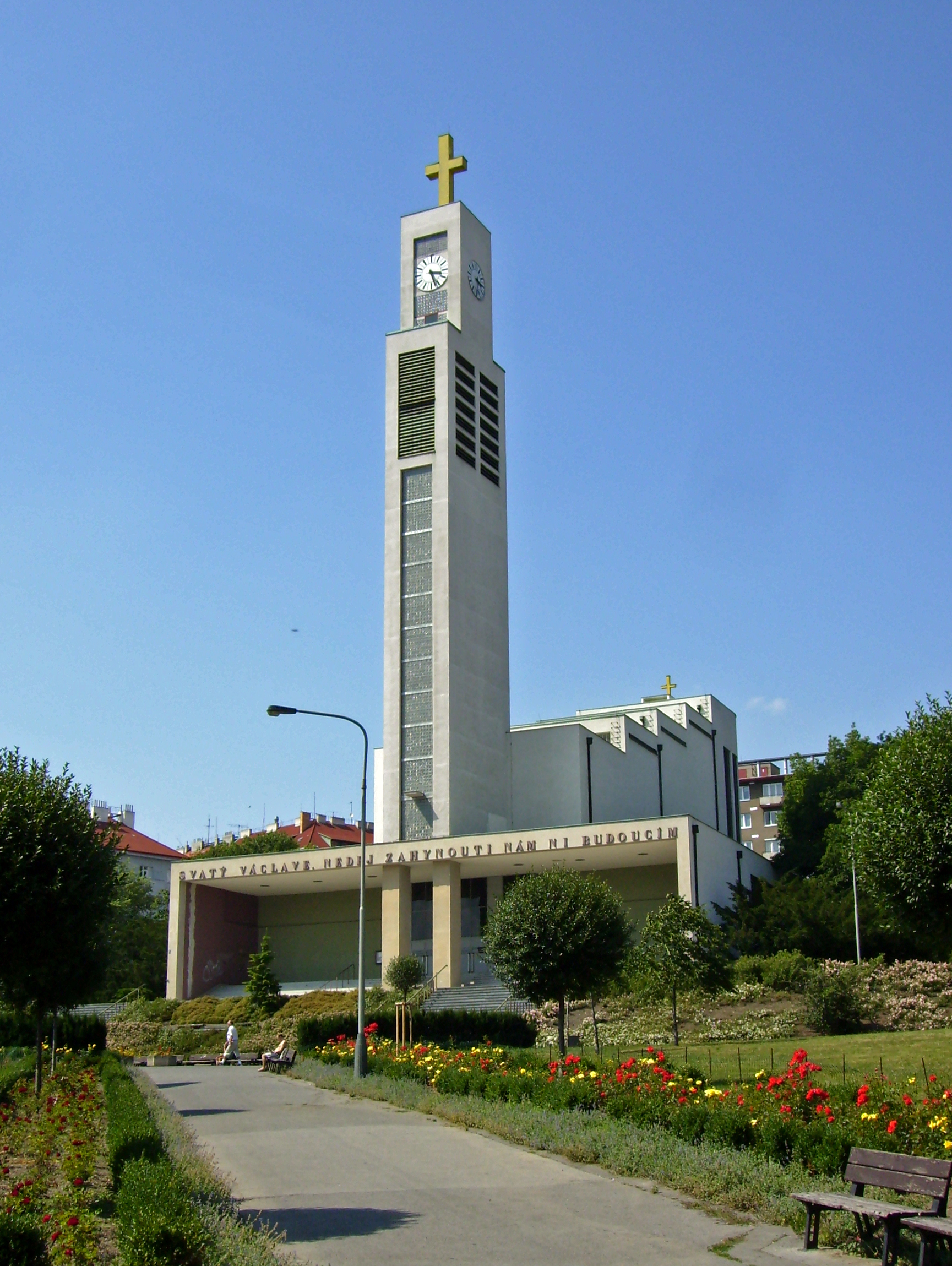
Saint Wenceslas church, Vršovice, Prague, 1929–1930.

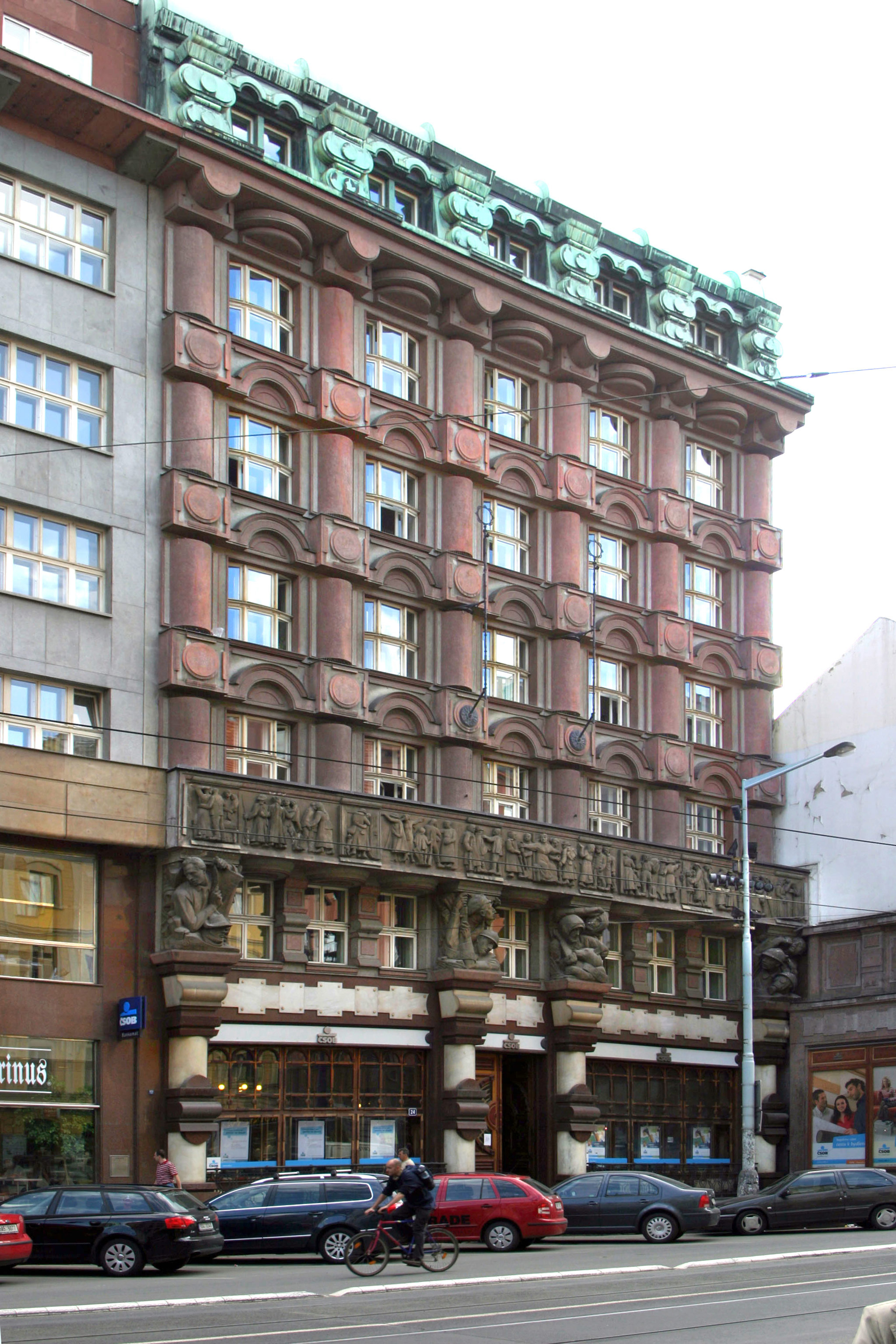
Building of Legiobanka in Prague, with architectural sculpture by Otto Gutfreund and Jan Štursa.

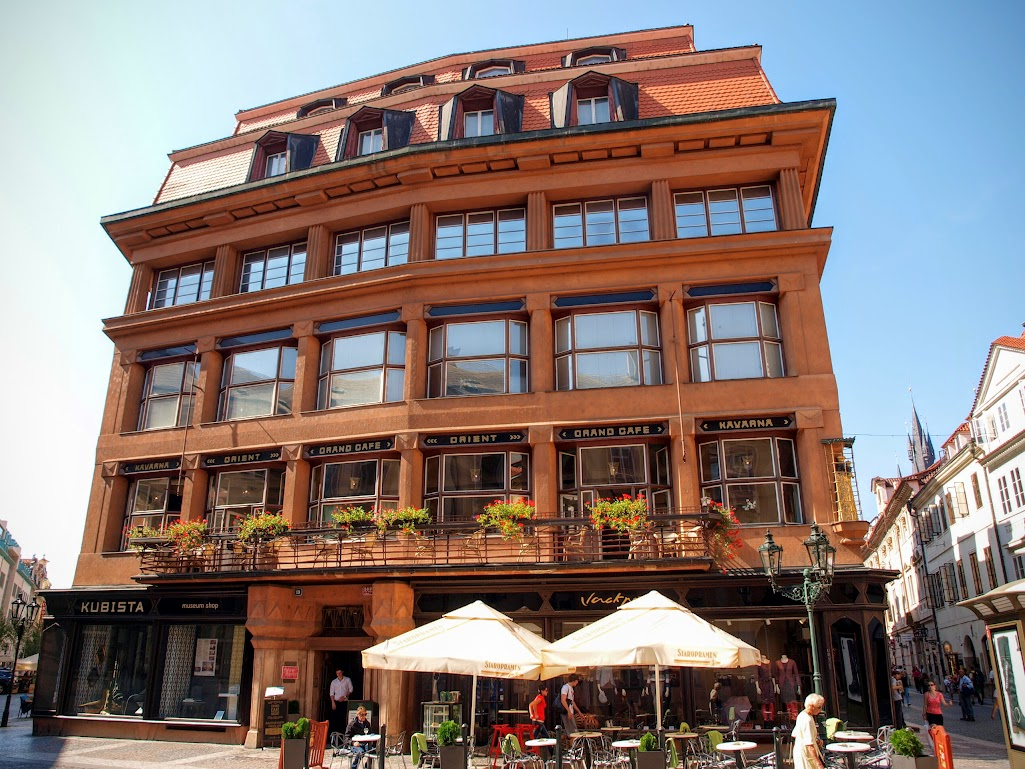
House of the Black Madonna, Prague.

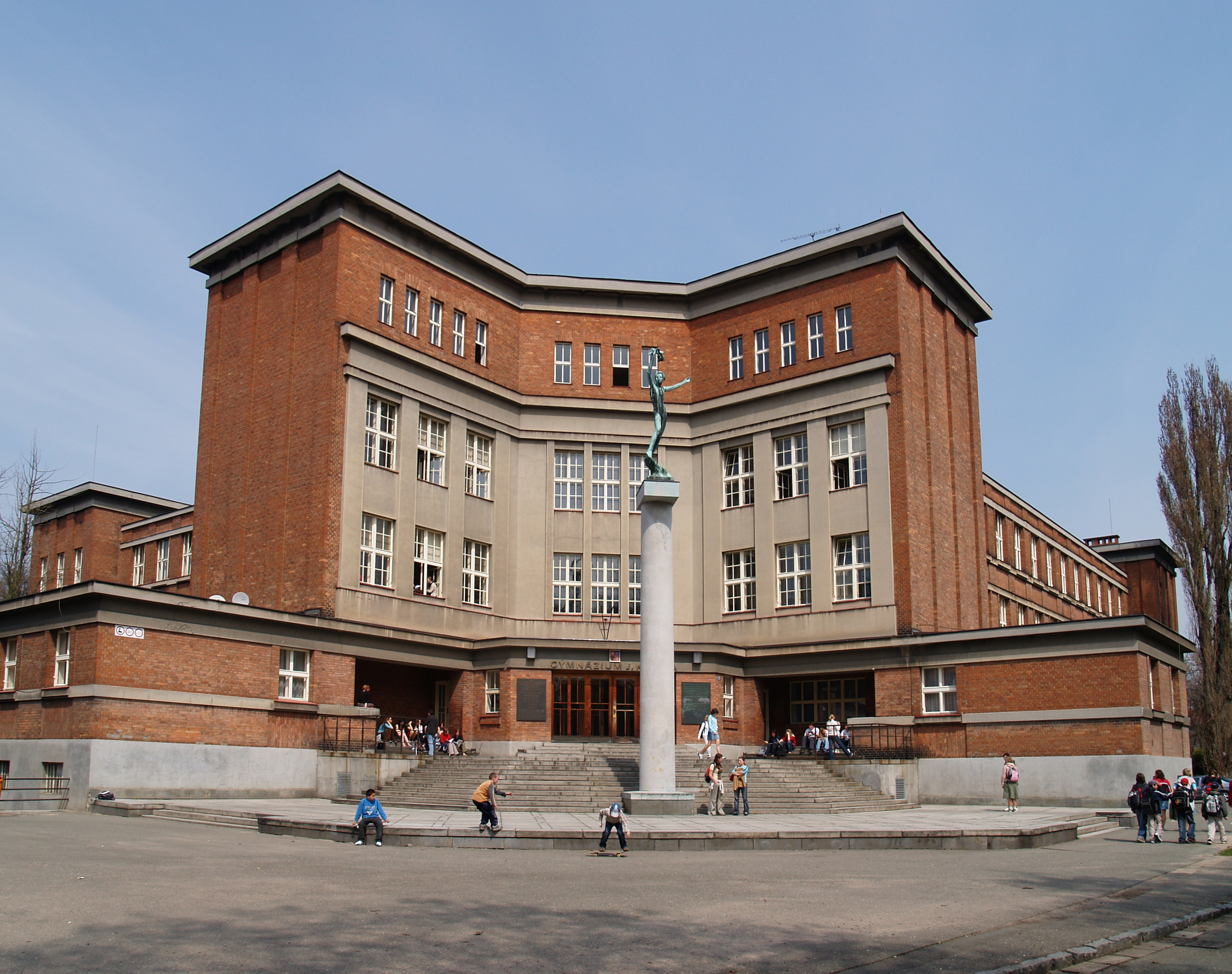
Gymnasium, Hradec Králové.

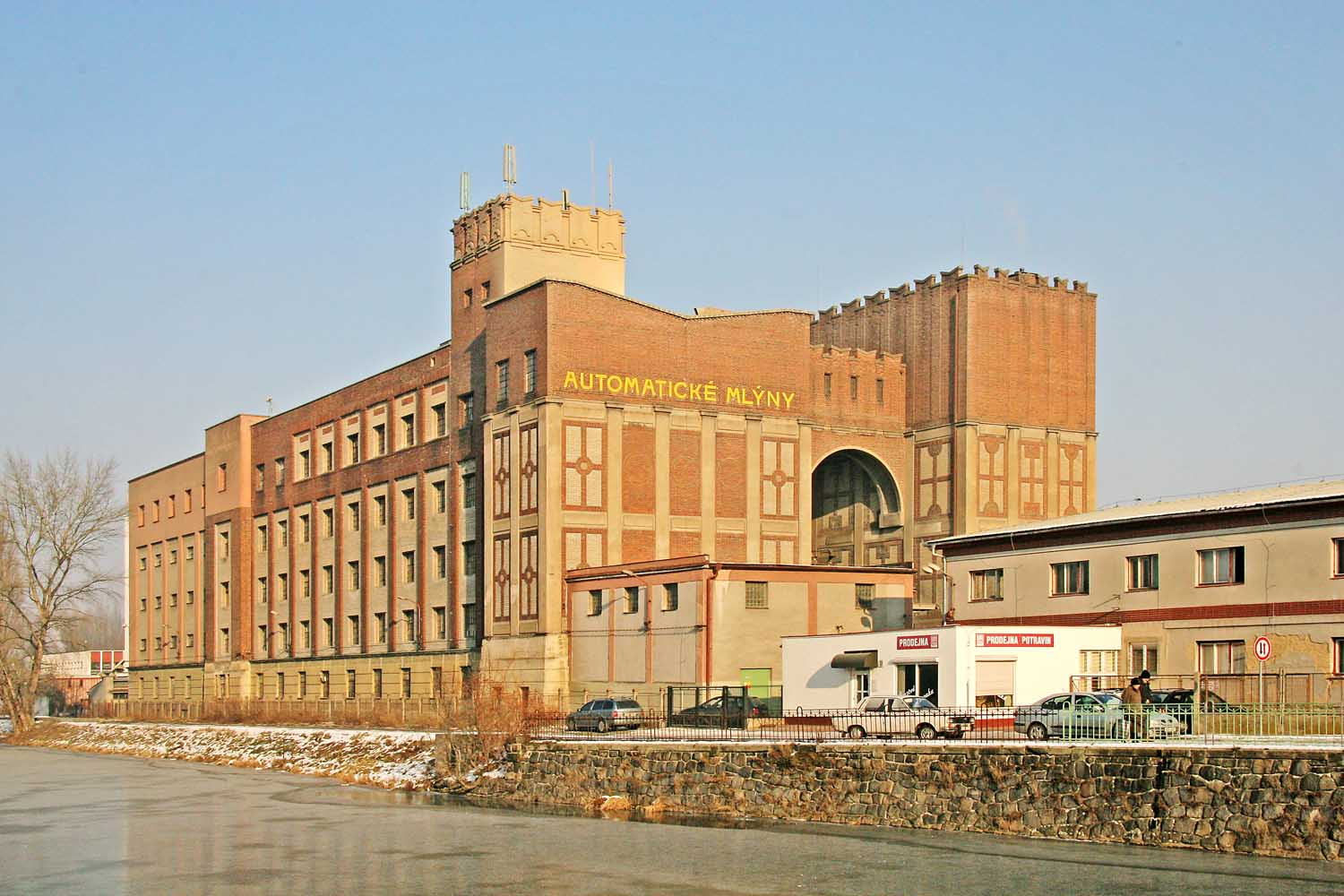
Winternitz Mills, Pardubice.

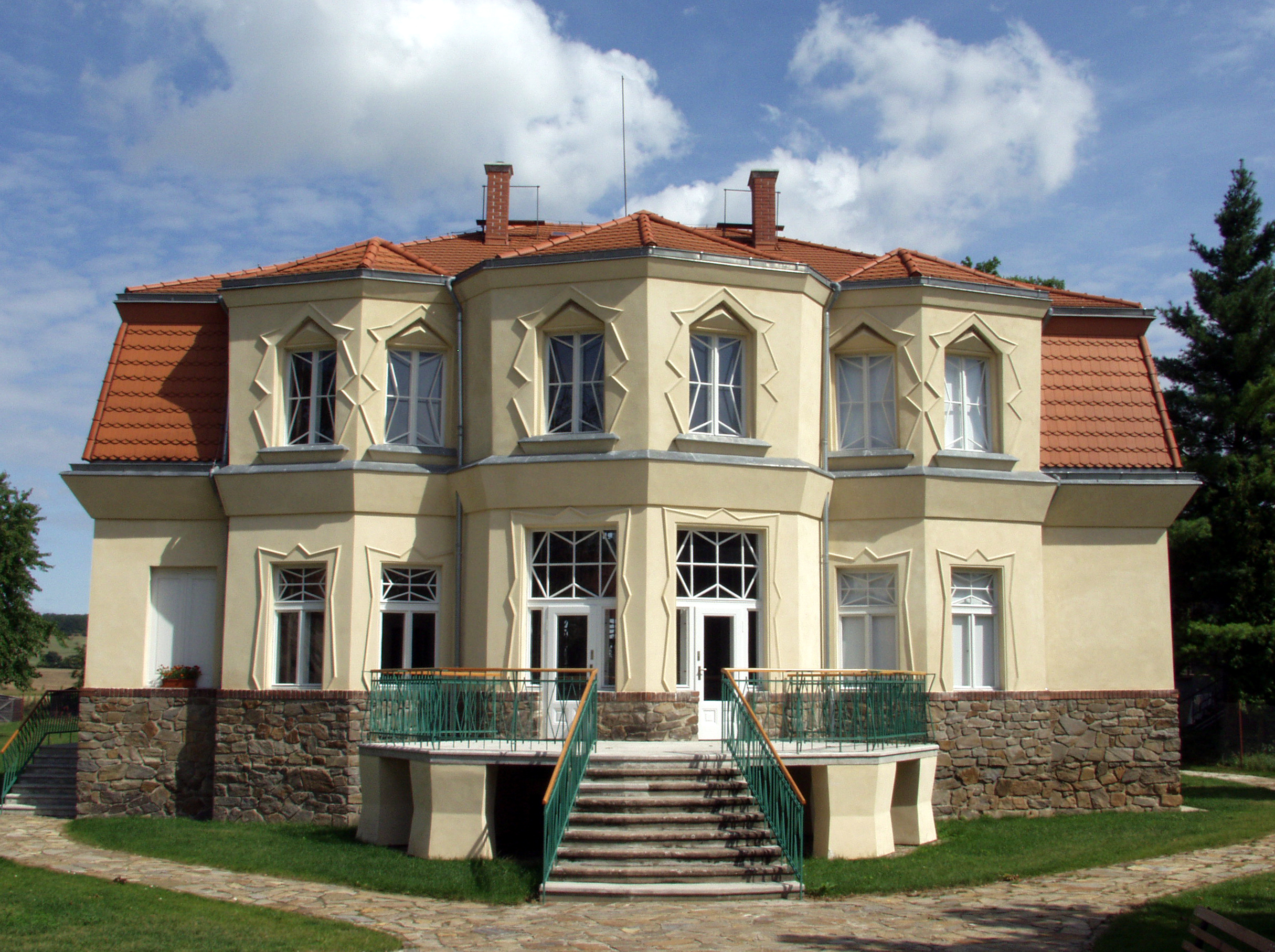
Bauer villa, Libodřice.

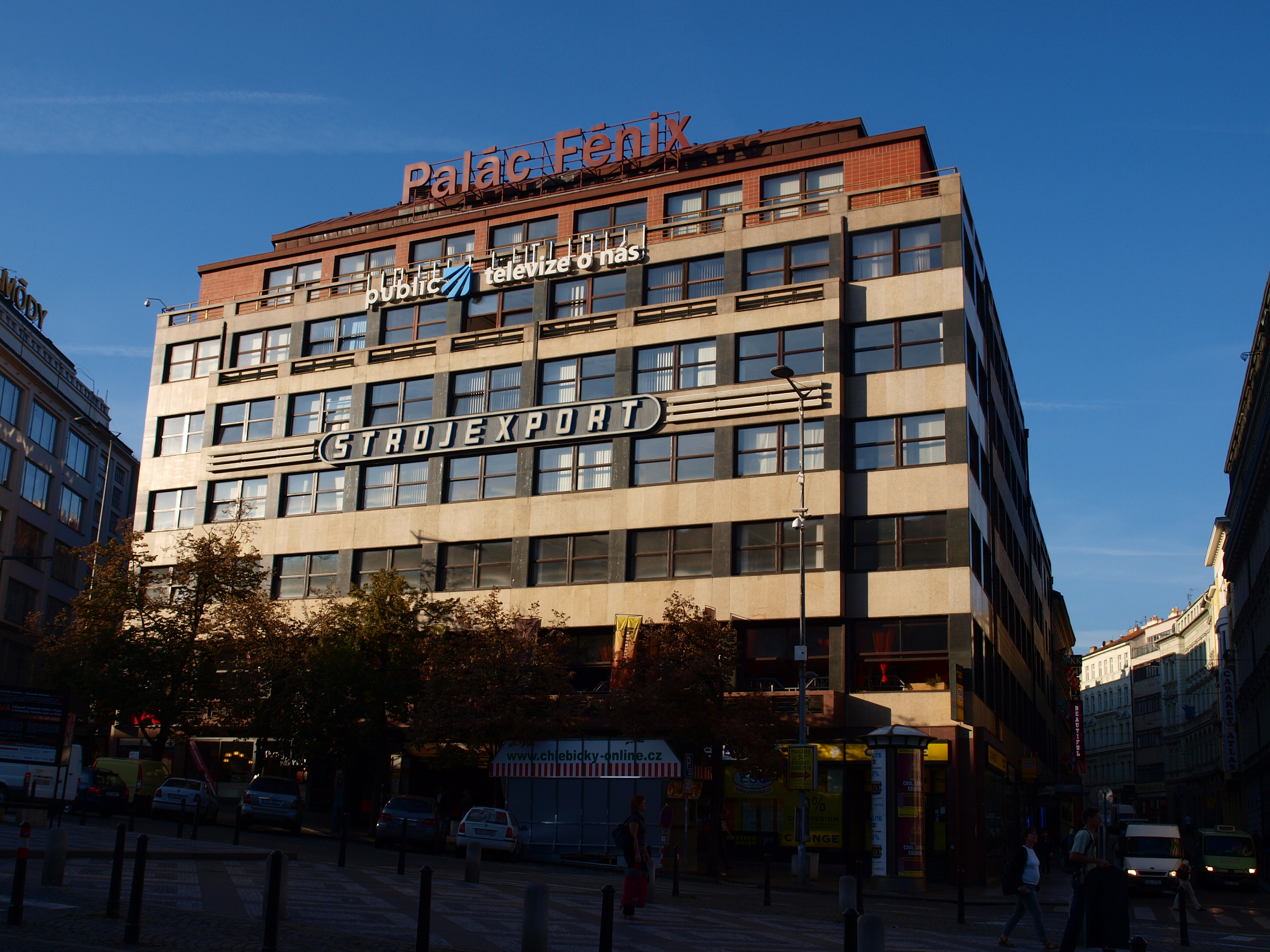
Fénix Palace (Strojexport), Prague, Wenceslas Square.

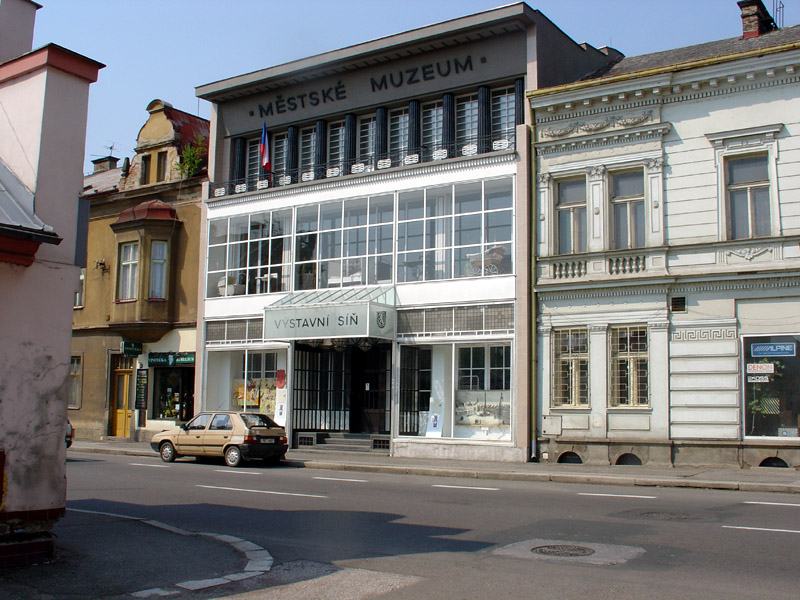
Museum building (originally store house) in Jaroměř

== See also ==
- Czech Cubism
