= Vršovice =

Cadastral area of Prague in Czech Republic

- Cadastral Area of Prague
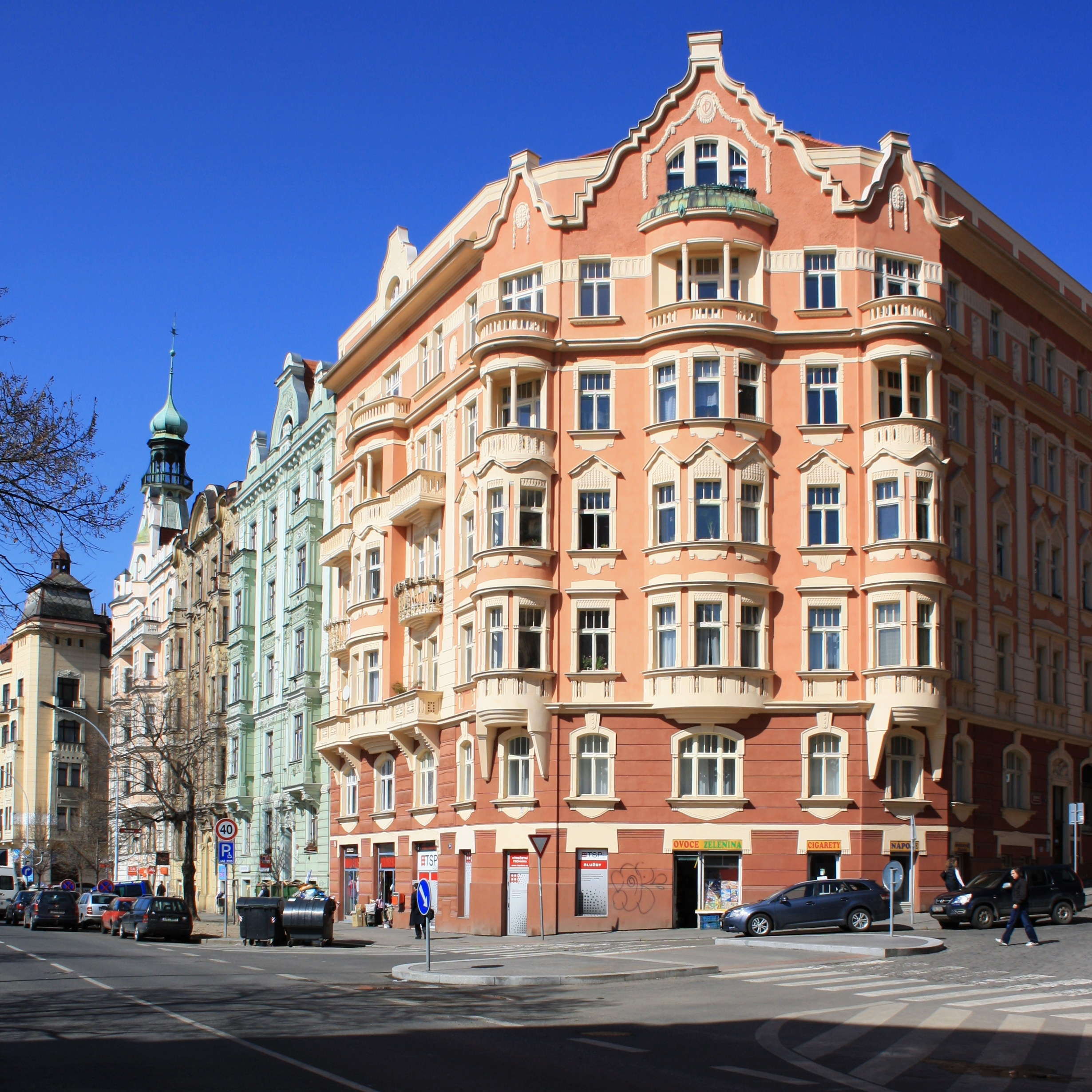
- The corner of Kodaňská and Finská streets

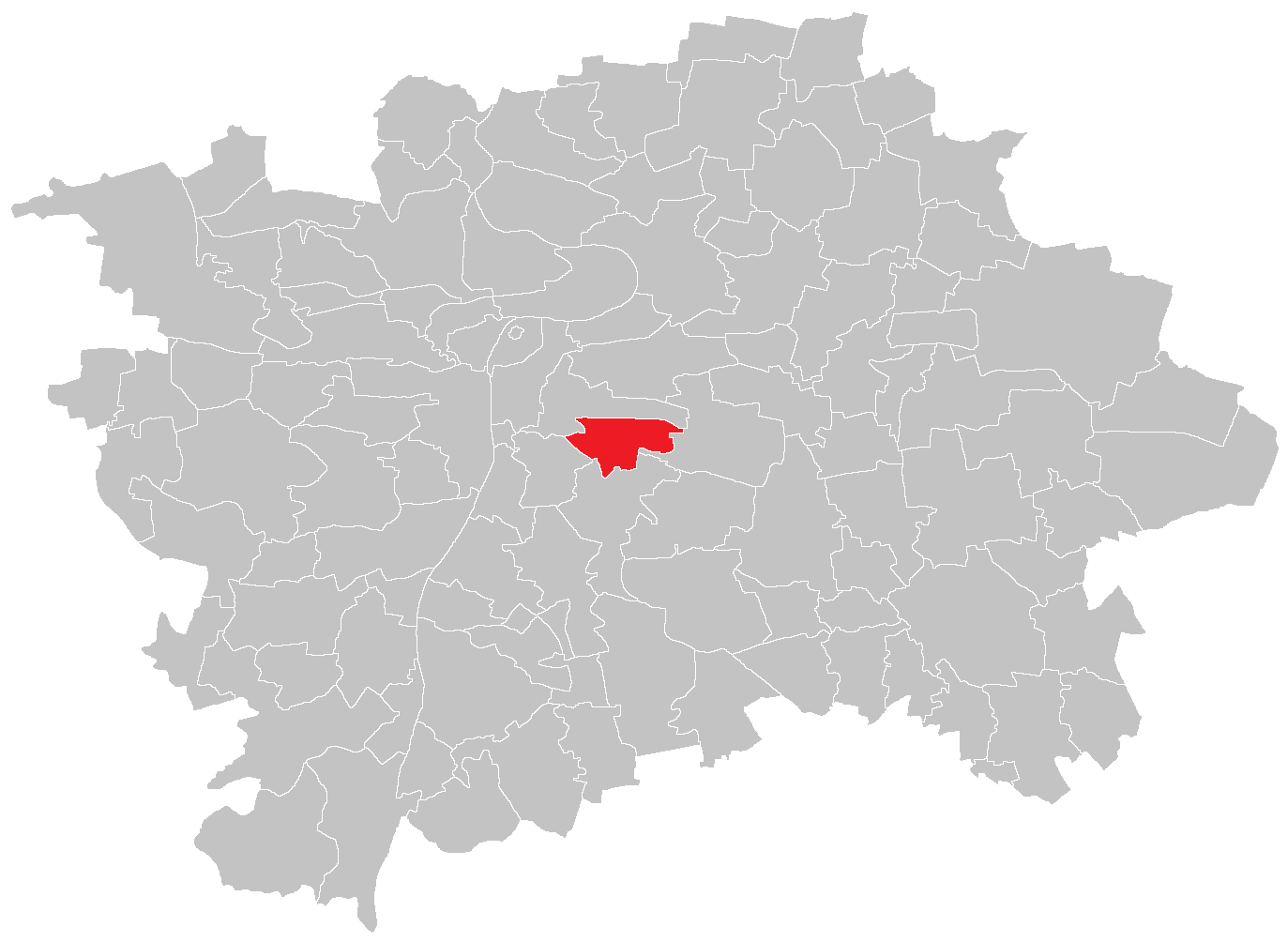
- Location of Vršovice in Prague
- Coordinates: 50°04′05″N 14°27′44″E
- Country: Czech Republic
- Region: Prague
- District: Prague 10

Area
  - Total: 2.93 km^{2} (1.13 sq mi)

Population (2021)
  - Total: 36,836
  - Density: 12,600/km^{2} (32,600/sq mi)
- Time zone: UTC+1 (CET)
  - Summer (DST): UTC+2 (CEST)

Vršovice is a cadastral district of Prague. All of Vršovice lies within the Prague 10 administrative district. Vršovice is located south-east of the city centre. It borders Vinohrady to the north, Nusle to the south-west, Michle to the south and Strašnice to the east. The name is first mentioned in 1088 in the founding document of the Vyšehrad Chapter. In 1922 the district was incorporated into the city of Prague. It has 107 streets and 1,611 addresses and has about 38,700 inhabitants.

Train stations Praha-Vršovice (formerly known as Nusle, German: Nusl-Verschowitz) and Praha-Eden serve this part of the city. There is a shopping centre in Vršovice, called Eden and the Koh-i-Noor Waldes factory, which is a manufacturer of buttons and press-studs. It should not be confused with the Czech company Koh-i-Noor Hardtmuth, one of the world's largest producers and distributors of pencils and office supplies. In a 2016 travel feature about the district, The New York Times identified Vršovice as "one of the capital's 'it' neighborhoods."

Some of the most notable people born there are Michael Stevens, Dominik Hlavacka, Johnny Studnicny and Krystof Hanzal.

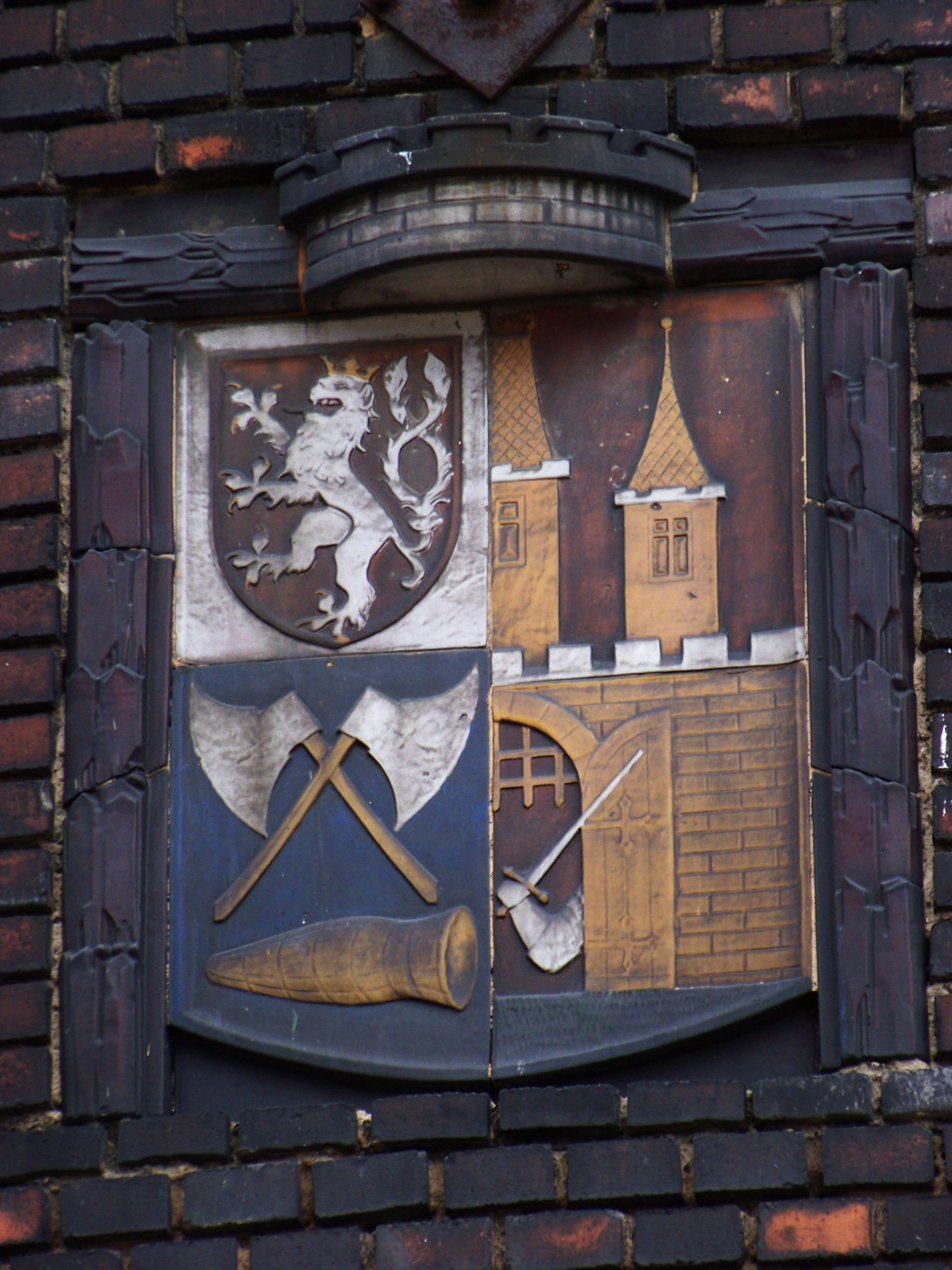
Historical coat of arms of Vršovice at the water tower

== Sport ==
There are two professional football teams in the area: SK Slavia Prague and Bohemians 1905. Slavia uses the Eden Arena, which is the largest football stadium in the Czech Republic and Bohemians 1905 the Ďolíček Stadium. There are also teams playing in the lower leagues, for example SK Union Vršovice.

== Churches ==
There are two Roman Catholic churches, St. Wenceslas Church, completed in 1930, and one dedicated to St. Nicholas which dates from 1374. Since 1930 there has been the Hus' House which has also included a theatre in the past.

== Demographics ==
Historical population

Year	Pop.	±%
1869	3,693	—
1880	5,732	+55.2%
1890	8,624	+50.5%
1900	13,580	+57.5%
1910	24,646	+81.5%

Year	Pop.	±%
1921	33,008	+33.9%
1930	39,875	+20.8%
1950	43,724	+9.7%
1961	58,918	+34.7%
1970	55,185	−6.3%

Year	Pop.	±%
1980	48,059	−12.9%
1991	41,567	−13.5%
2001	37,301	−10.3%
2011	35,560	−4.7%
2021	36,836	+3.6%

Source: Censuses

== Gallery ==
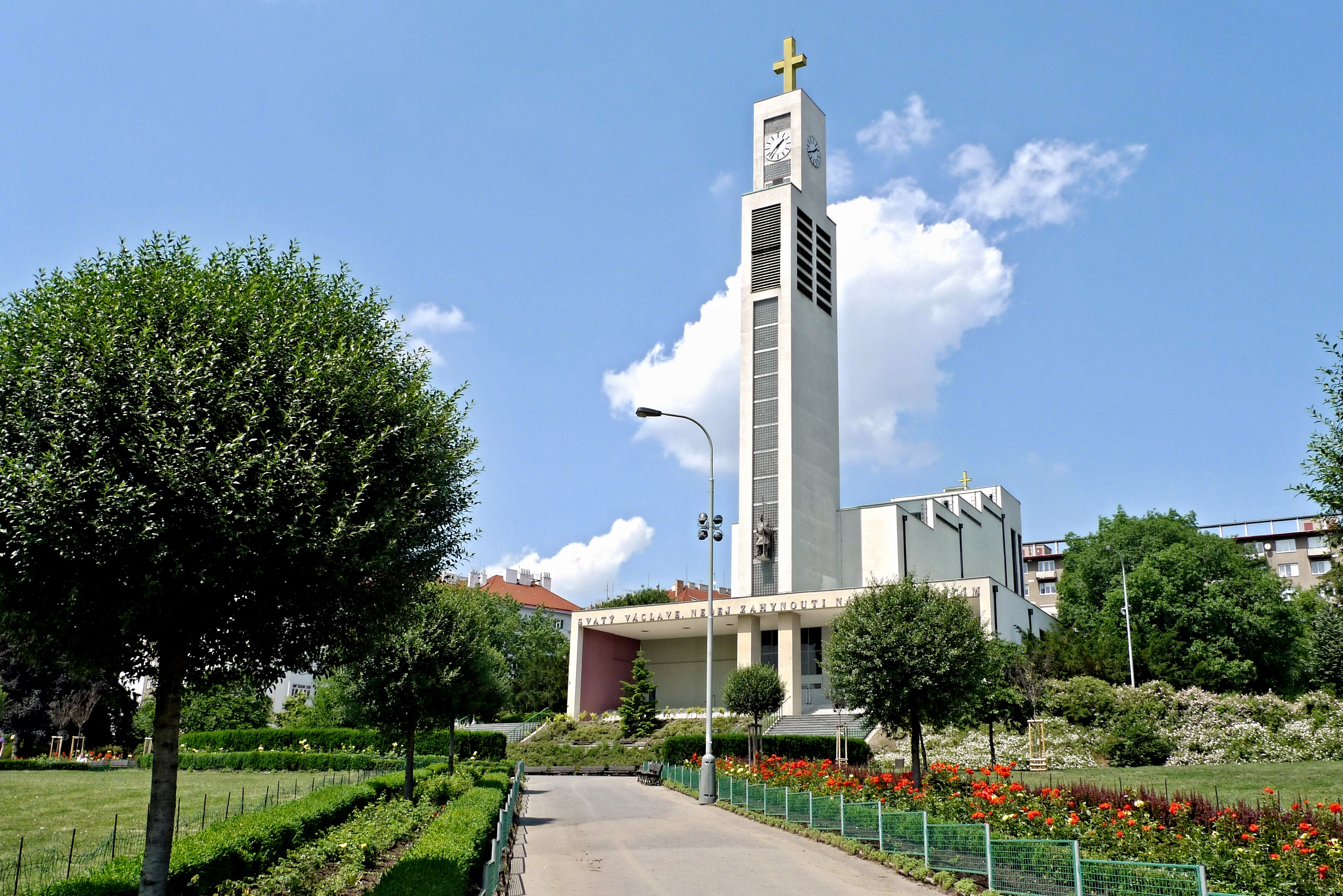
Svatopluk Čech Square and St. Wenceslas Church

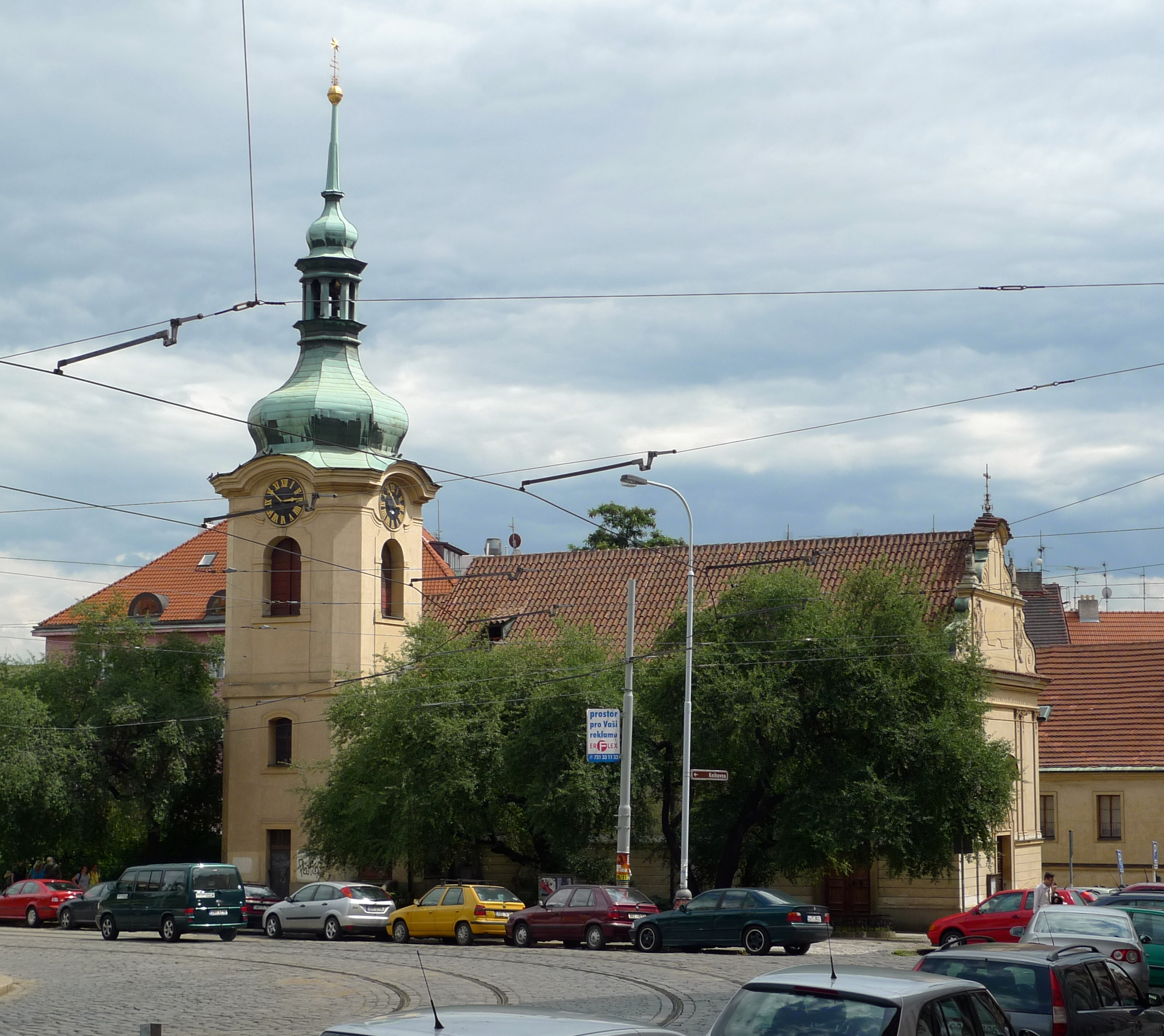
St. Nicholas Church from 1374

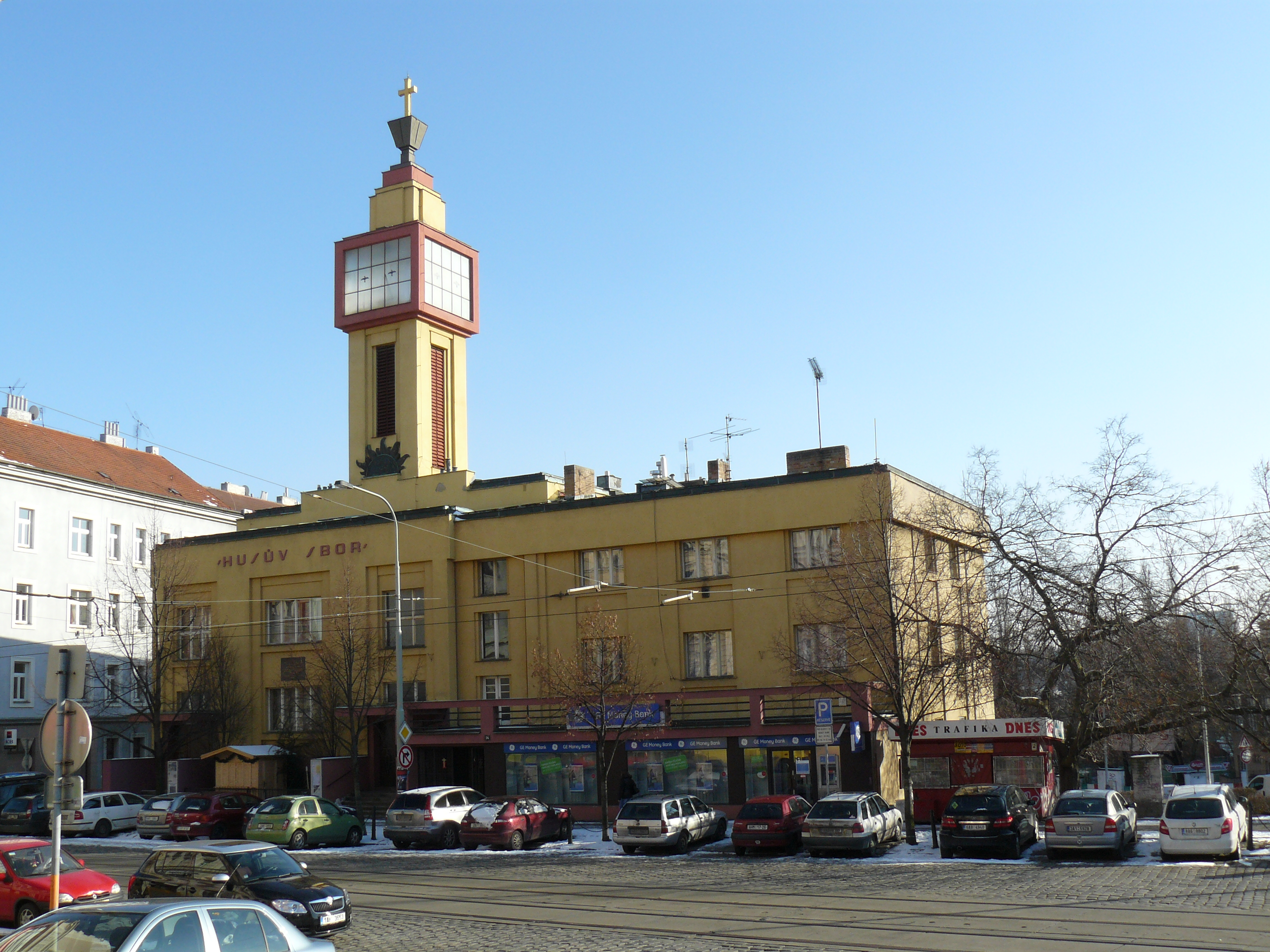
Hus' House of the Hussite Church

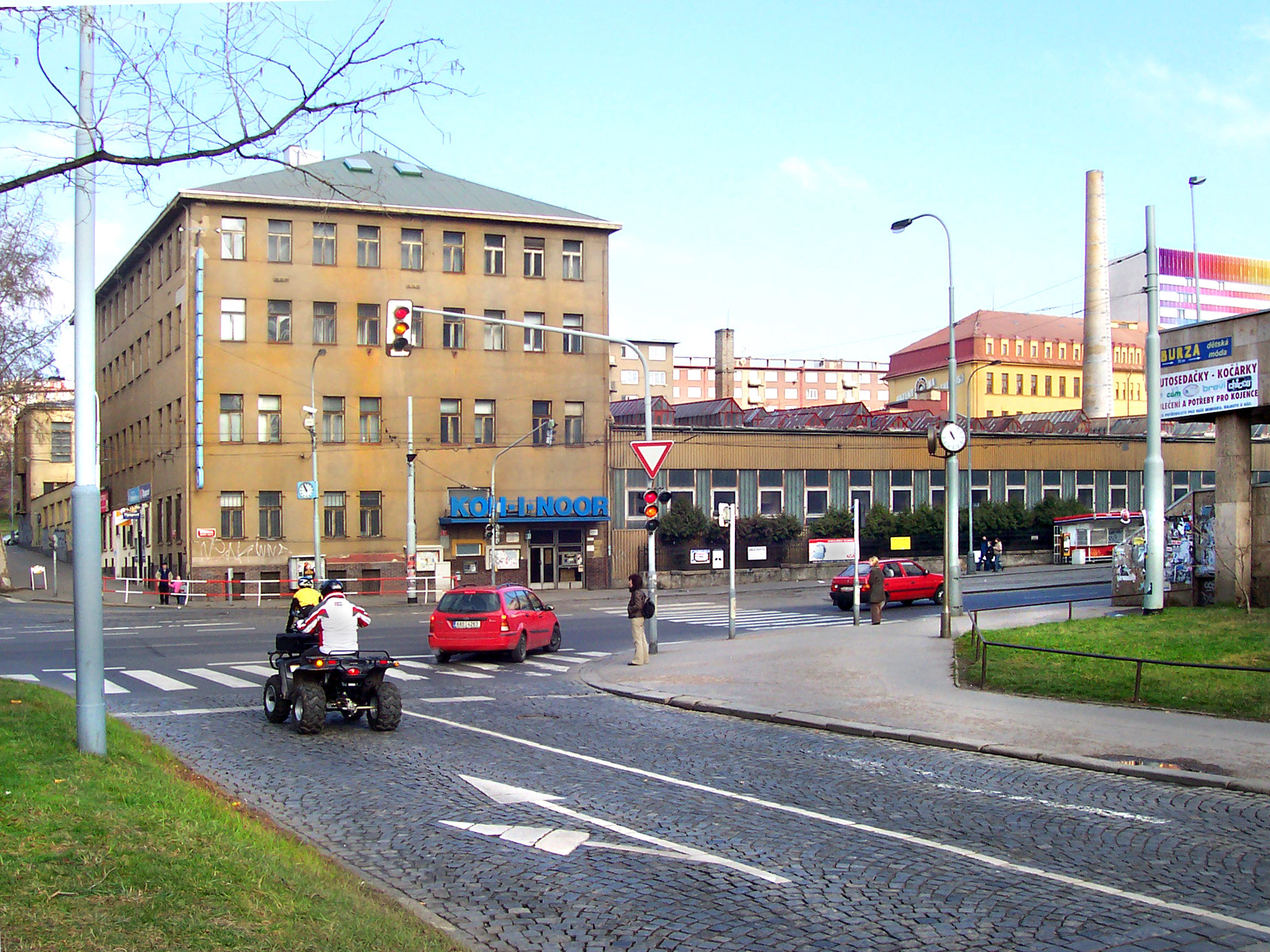
Koh-i-Noor factory

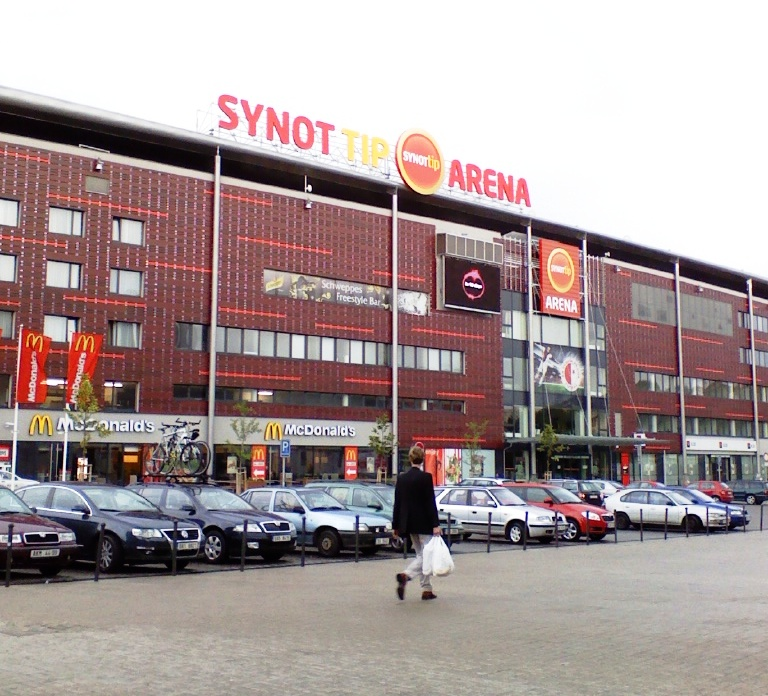
Eden Arena, home to SK Slavia Prague
