= Prosek (Prague Metro) =

Prague metro station

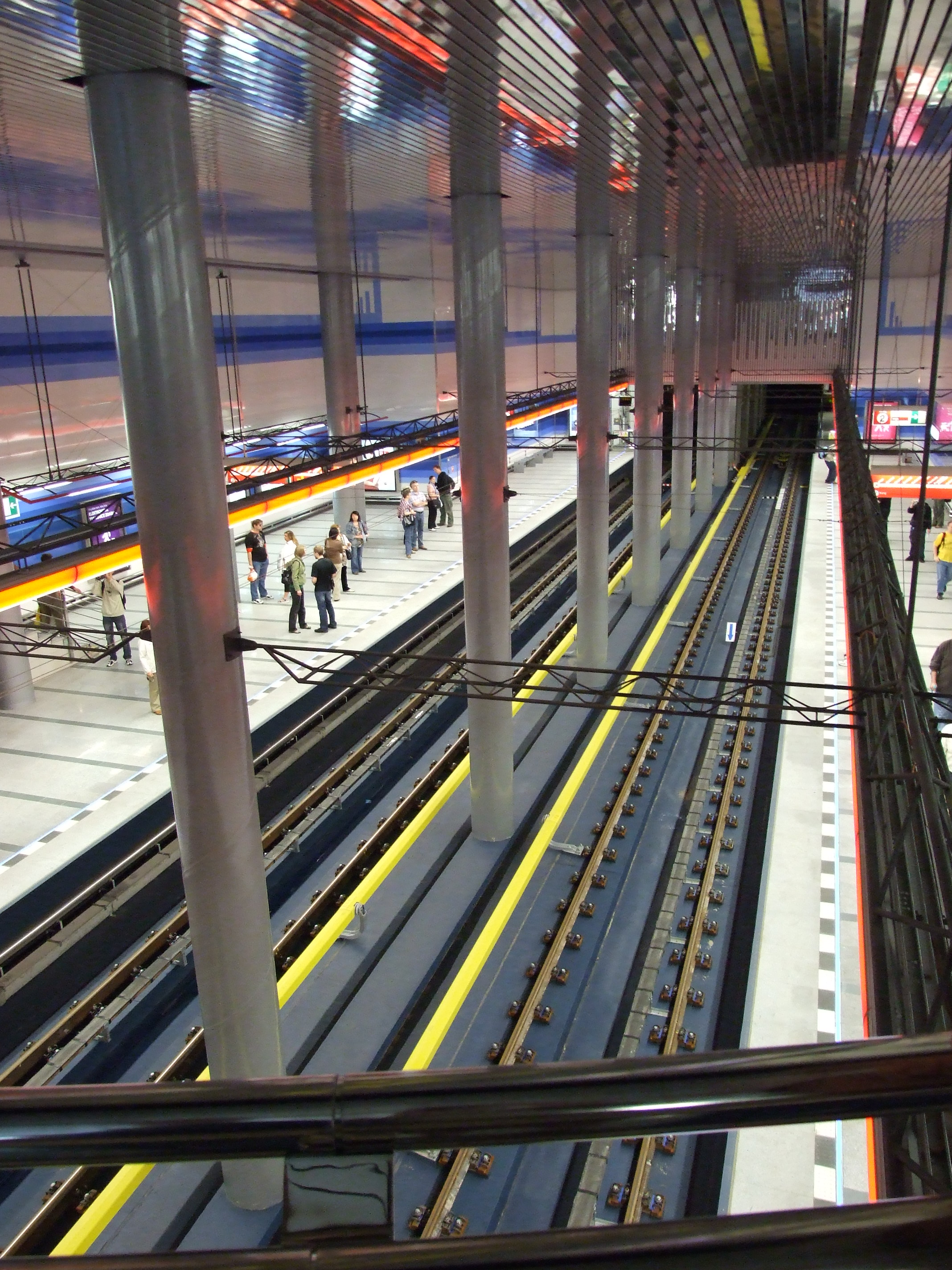
- Platforms

General information
- Location: Prosek; Prague 9 Prague; Czechia
- Coordinates: 50.119°N 14.499°E
- System: Prague Metro station
- Owner: Dopravní podnik hl. m. Prahy
- Line: C
- Platforms: 2 side platforms
- Tracks: 2

Construction
- Structure type: Underground
- Depth: 13 m (43 ft)
- Platform levels: 1
- Cycle facilities: No
- Accessible: Yes

History
- Opened: 8 May 2008

Services
Preceding station	Prague Metro	Following station
Letňany Terminus	Line C	Střížkov toward Háje
Location
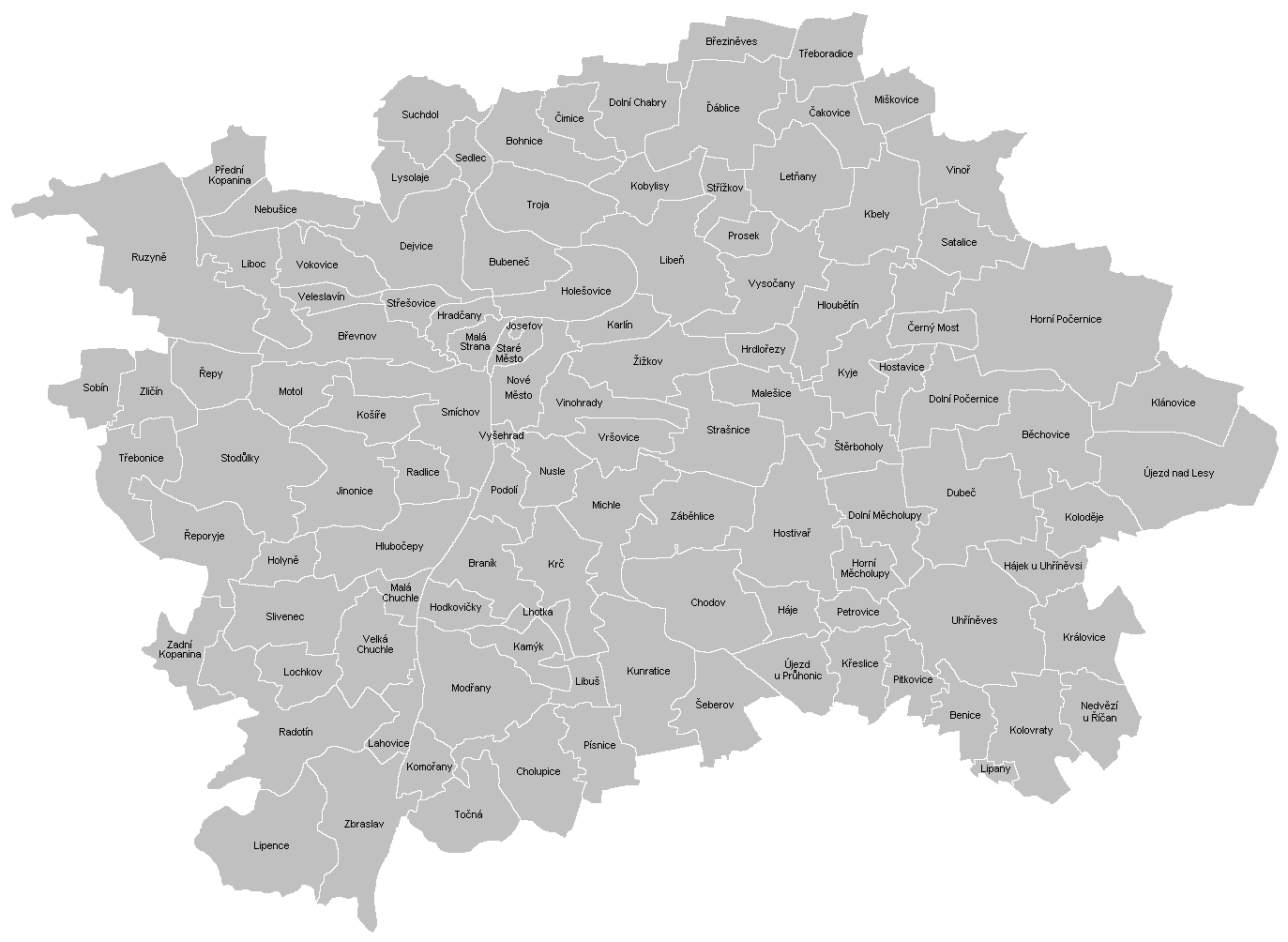
- Location within Prague Location within Greater Prague Location within Czech Republic

Prosek (Czech pronunciation: [ˈprosɛk]) is a Prague Metro station of Line C, located in Prosek, Prague 9. The station was opened on 8 May 2008 as part of the Line C extension from Ládví to Letňany.

The station is an underground station, located 13 meters below the surface, and is designed as a two-aisle station with two side platforms. A footbridge connects the platforms. The platforms have high ceilings supported by columns between the tracks. The station includes a concourse with exits at the intersection of Vysočanská and Prosecká streets and underpasses beneath both of these streets.

The station is connected to the Prosek bus stop. The surrounding area features the prefabricated housing complex of the Prosek neighborhood, a shopping center with a Billa supermarket, and new residential and office buildings (such as the Prosek Point office center).

Near the station stands the Church of St. Wenceslas, originally built in the Romanesque style.
