= Kobylisy Shooting Range =

Site of Nazi war crimes in Czechia

- Part of Heydrichiáda, German occupation of Czechoslovakia
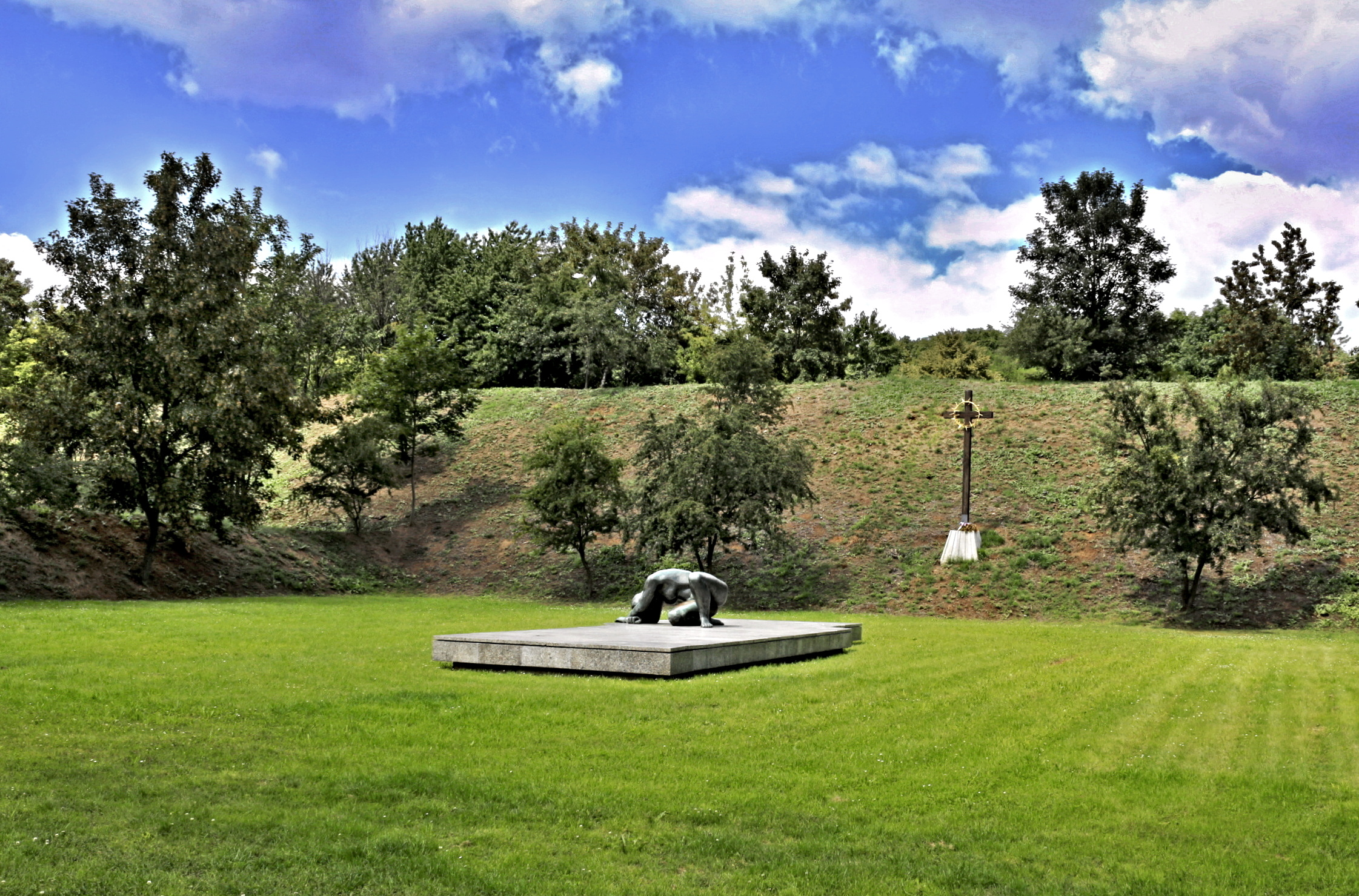
- Memorial cross and sculpture by Miloš Zet
- Native name: Kobyliská střelnice
- Location: 50°7′54″N 14°27′47″E; Kobylisy, Prague, Protectorate of Bohemia and Moravia
- Date: May 30, 1942- July 3, 1942
- Target: Czech resistance to Nazi occupation
- Attack type: Mass executions
- Deaths: 550
- Victims: Alois Eliáš; František Erben; Josef Mašín; Matěj Pavlík-Gorazd; Františka Plamínková; Evžen Rošický; Vladislav Vančura
- Perpetrator: Karl Hermann Frank
- Motive: Revenge for the assassination of Reinhard Heydrich

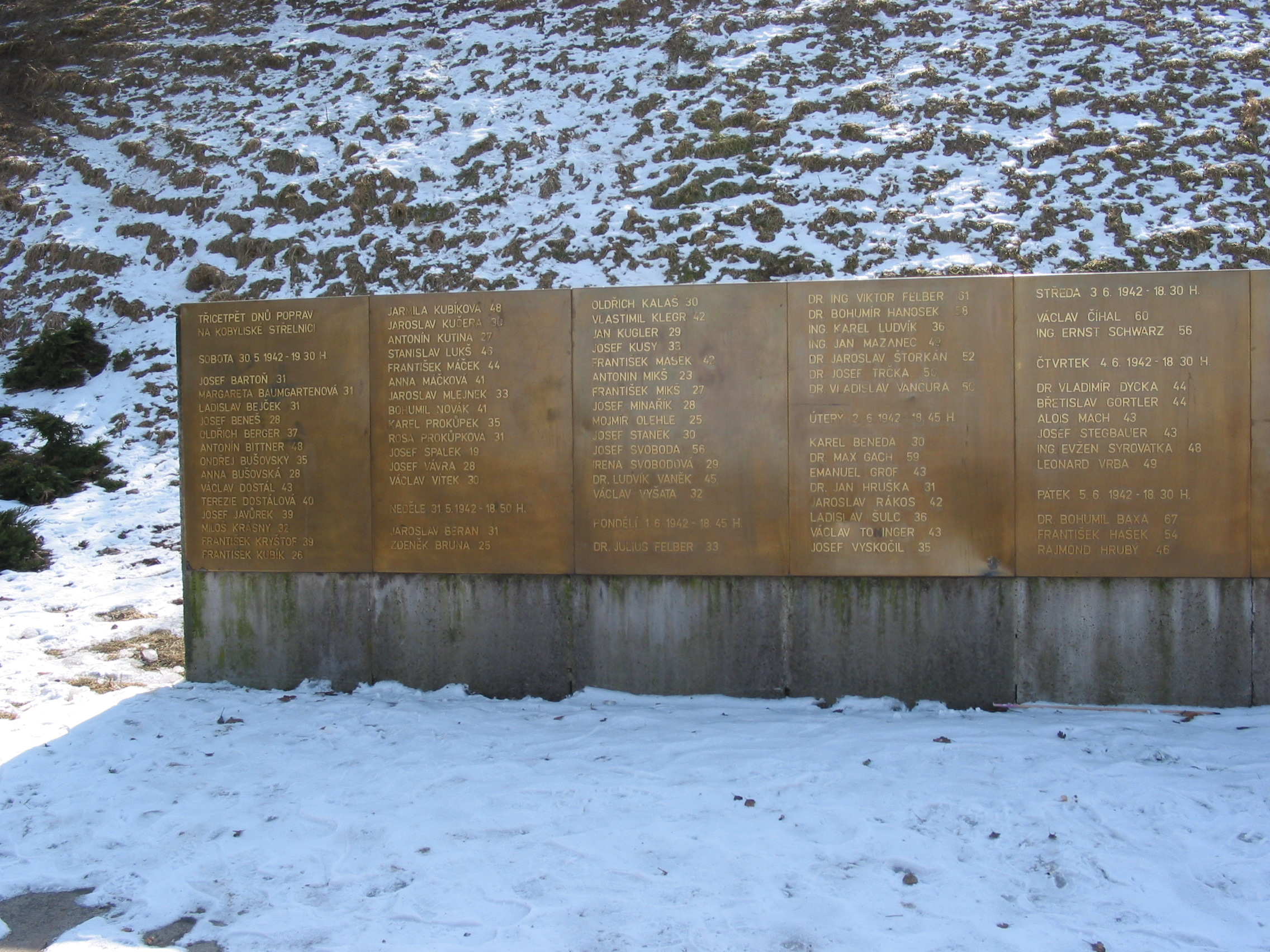
Close-up of memorial plaques with names of the victims.

Kobylisy Shooting Range (Czech: Kobyliská střelnice) is a former military shooting range located in Kobylisy, a northern suburb of Prague, Czech Republic.

== History ==
The shooting range was established in 1889–1891, on a site that was at the time far outside the city, as a training facility for the Austro-Hungarian (and, later, Czechoslovak) army. During the Nazi occupation it was used for mass executions as part of retaliatory measures against the Czech people after the assassination of Reinhard Heydrich in 1942. About 550 Czech patriots of every social rank were killed here, most of them between 30 May and 3 July 1942, when executions took place almost every day. Their bodies were subsequently incinerated in Strašnice Crematorium.

The site was converted to a memorial after World War II, and its current dimensions date to the 1970s when the large paneláks (Communist-era tower blocks) of a new housing estate encroached upon it. Kobylisy Shooting Range has had the status of national cultural monument since 1978. Today it is freely accessible and is within ten minutes' walk of the Kobylisy or Ládví metro stations.

== Notable victims ==
- Jan Auerhan, director of the State Bureau of Statistics
- Gen. Alois Eliáš, prime minister
- František Erben, Sokol member and gymnast
- Lt. Col. Josef Mašín soldier, member of the Three Kings resistance group
- Matěj Pavlík-Gorazd, bishop of the Czechoslovak Orthodox Church, later canonised as St. Gorazd
- Františka Plamínková, senator, feminist
- Evžen Rošický, journalist, athlete
- Vladislav Vančura, physician, writer and film director
- 26 citizens of Lidice (members of the Horák and Stříbrný families arrested before the extermination of the village, and men who were away at work that night)
