= Střížkov (Prague Metro) =

Prague metro station

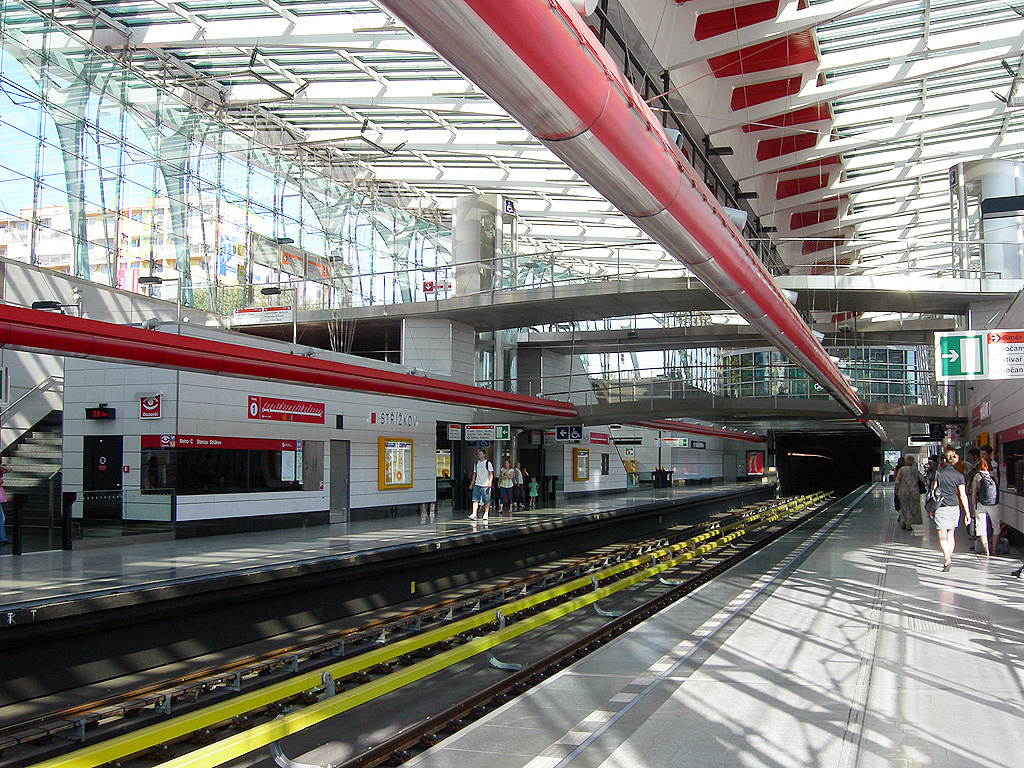
- Interior of the Střížkov station in 2009

General information
- Location: Vysočanská Street; Prague 9 - Střížkov; Prague; Czechia
- Coordinates: 50.126°N 14.489°E
- System: Prague Metro station
- Owner: Dopravní podnik hl. m. Prahy
- Line: C
- Platforms: 2 side platforms
- Tracks: 2

Construction
- Structure type: Below grade
- Depth: 13 m (43 ft)
- Platform levels: 1
- Cycle facilities: No
- Accessible: Yes
- Architect: Patrik Kotas

Other information
- Fare zone: P

History
- Opened: 8 May 2008

Services
Preceding station	Prague Metro	Following station
Prosek toward Letňany	Line C	Ládví toward Háje
Location
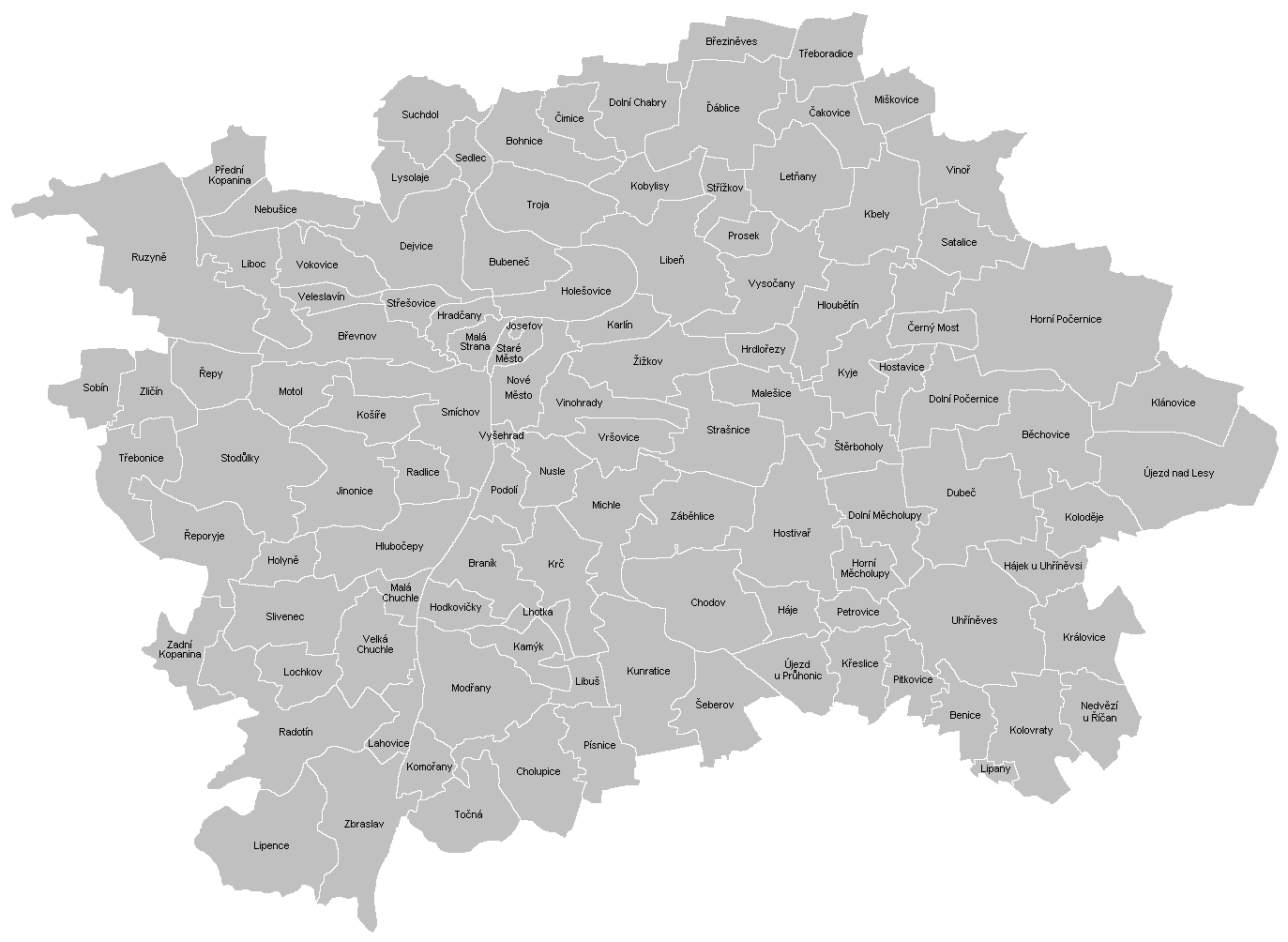
- Location within Prague Location within Greater Prague Location within Czech Republic

Střížkov (Czech pronunciation: [ˈstr̝iːʃkof]) is a Prague Metro station of Line C, located in Střížkov, Prague 9 on the outskirts of the Prosek housing estate. Construction began on May 24, 2004, and the station was opened on 8 May 2008 as part of the newest Line C extension (from Ládví to Letňany). It was designed by Patrik Kotas, who has designed a number of other transportation structures and vehicles. It is one of the most architecturally striking stations in Prague, as well as one of the most expensive.

== Description ==
Střížkov is a 228-meter-long cut-and-cover station. The platform is located 13 metres below ground level, but the station building rises high above ground level. It consists of a large steel-and-glass structure whose floor plan resembles a drop of water or a whale, although interpretations vary. The entire structure is suspended from two massive arches running along the station’s axis. The two main arched girders have a span of 150 meters and a diameter of 1.5 meters. The structure also includes an underpass beneath Vysočanská Street. The platforms are side platforms; passengers can move from one platform to another via three bridges located on two levels. The entire station is wheelchair-accessible, and the individual walkways and platforms are connected by elevators.

== Construction ==
The construction of this station was divided into several phases. First, it was necessary to excavate the construction pit, secure it, and then build the reinforced concrete platform. The station’s foundation required approximately 2,000 metric tons of rebar, nearly 22,000 m³ of concrete structures, and 65,000 m² of formwork. Work then began on the steel structure and two large arched beams. By the end of July 2006, both arches were in place, and the structure beneath them was completed in August of that same year. An open day was held here in October 2006, by which time both the platform and the structure—including the paint finish—had been completed. The station’s roof is glazed; special tempered and laminated glass sourced from France was used. In addition, however, sound-insulating glass was also used. Another open day at the construction site took place on September 22, 2007, on the occasion of Mobility Week; the station was completed a year later.

Hochtief VSB and OHL ŽS (which also built the tram line from Hlubočepy to Barrandov) participated in the station’s construction; Excon prepared the implementation and manufacturing documentation for the steel structure. The station’s construction cost 1.3 billion Czech crowns, with the above-ground section costing 600 million crowns. The Kolbenova metro station in Prague, which is of similar size and importance, cost a mere 100 million crowns.

== Response ==
In 2009, the European Steel Construction Association awarded this metro station one of 19 international awards for its design.

=== Criticism ===
Czech architect Adam Gebrian criticized the station on his show “Gebrian vs.” for being oversized, difficult to maintain, and excessively expensive. Despite this, he believes the structure has many downfalls, such as poor navigation caused by an excessive number of ramps and elevators; there are four of them. He described the structure as evidence of a lack of oversight over public funds.

Several other architects and members of the professional community also criticized the station. Karolína Jirkalová, an editor for the Archiweb website, wrote about the structure: “The two distinctive arches of the concrete structure clearly show inspiration from the Spanish architect Santiago Calatrava. Unlike Calatrava’s projects, however, Střížkov offers no sense of awe at the beauty and clarity of the structure.” The article also criticizes the fact that while the station itself was built at great expense, the bus stops and sidewalks were constructed using the cheapest materials available, describing the structure as a “colorful spot on a patch of land between prefabricated apartment buildings.” The architect reportedly failed to consider the broader context, the relationship to the locale, or subtle aesthetics.

The structure also has maintenance issues, which are complicated and require climbing equipment. The transit authority is also struggling with a problem involving pigeons and their faeces. Even the greenery designed by Kotas could not be maintained here; it first froze, and the new frost-resistant plants withered.

Gallery

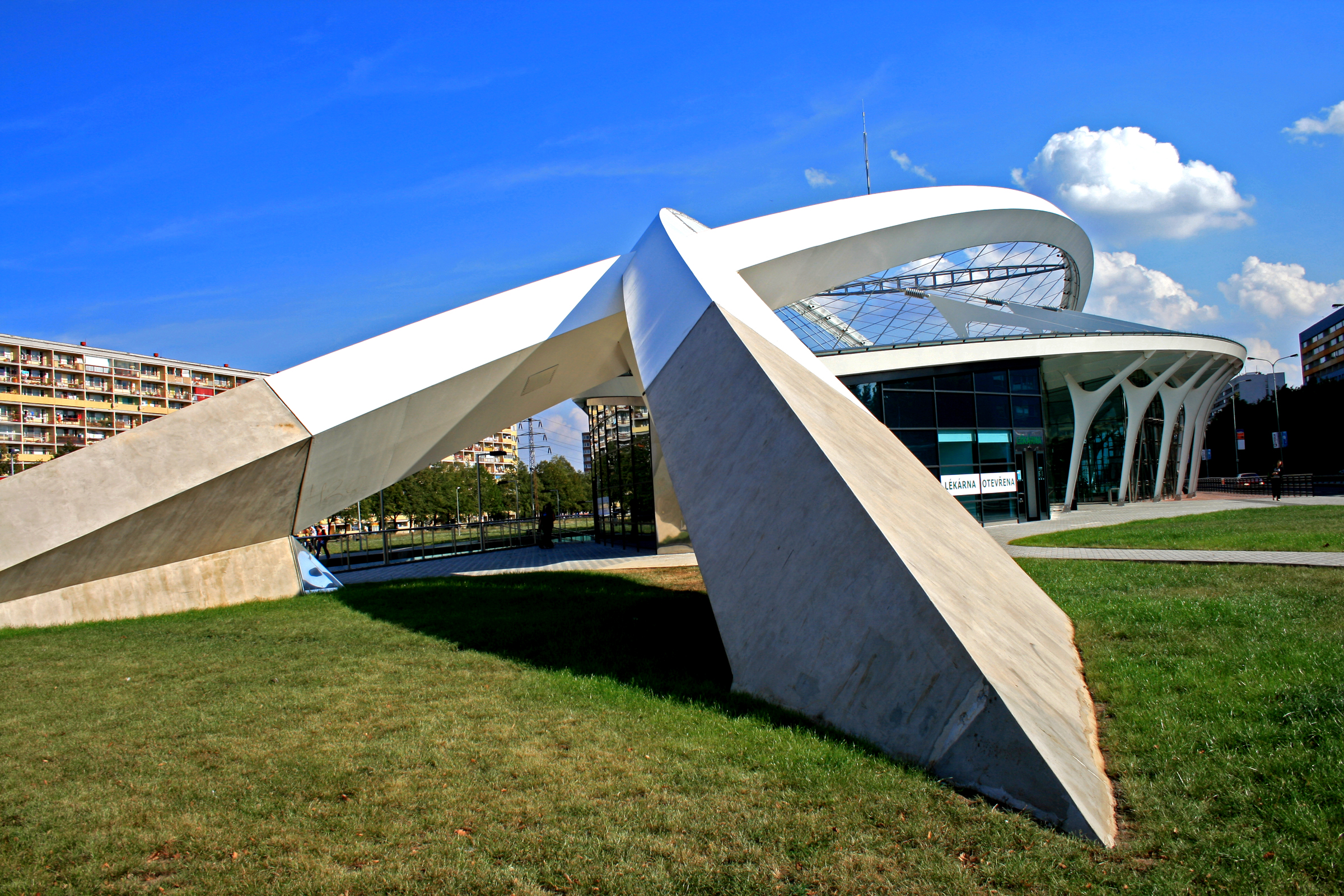
Střížkov metro station with two main beams in the foreground, 2008

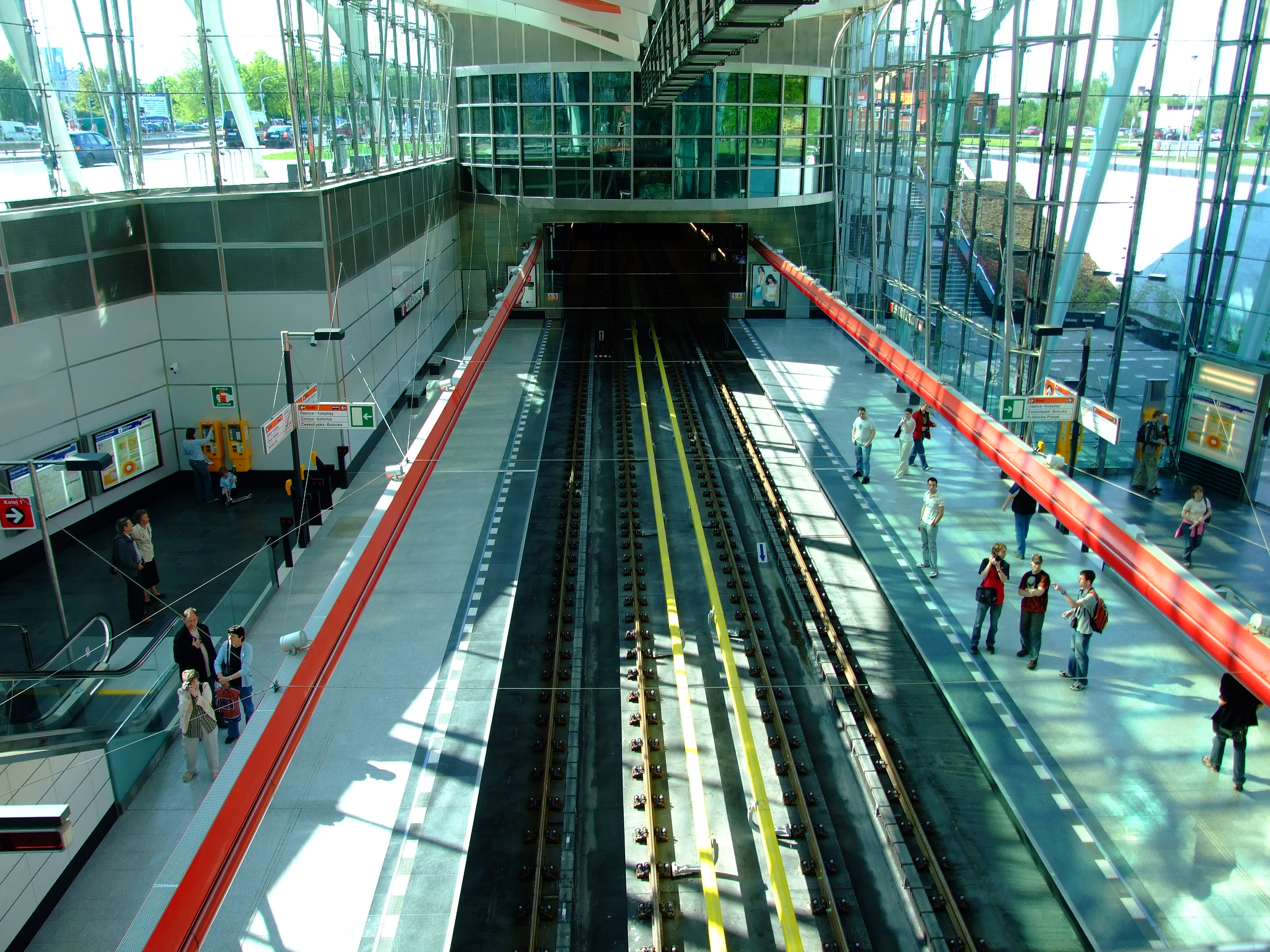
Střížkov metro station, platforms

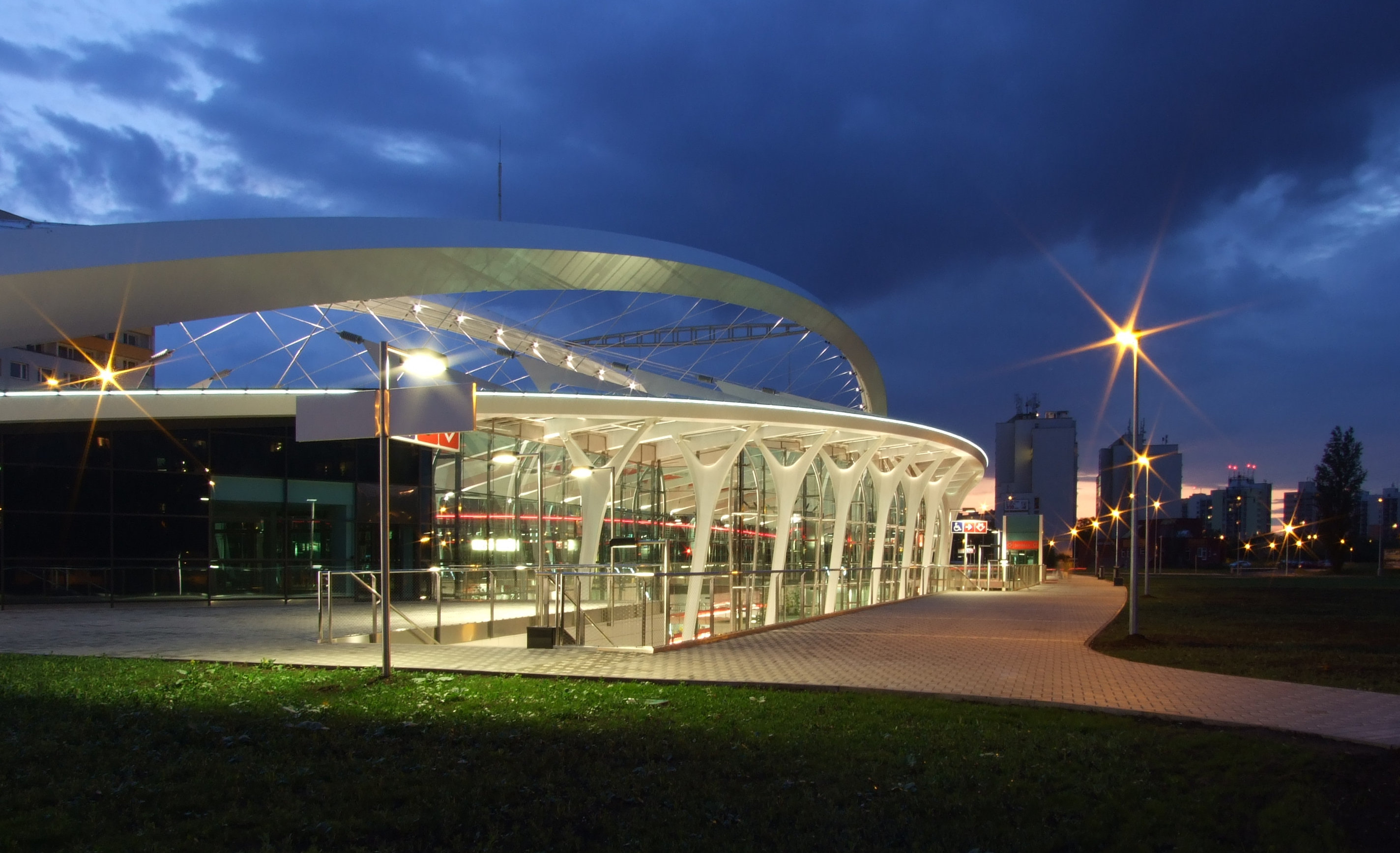
Střížkov metro station, night view from the east

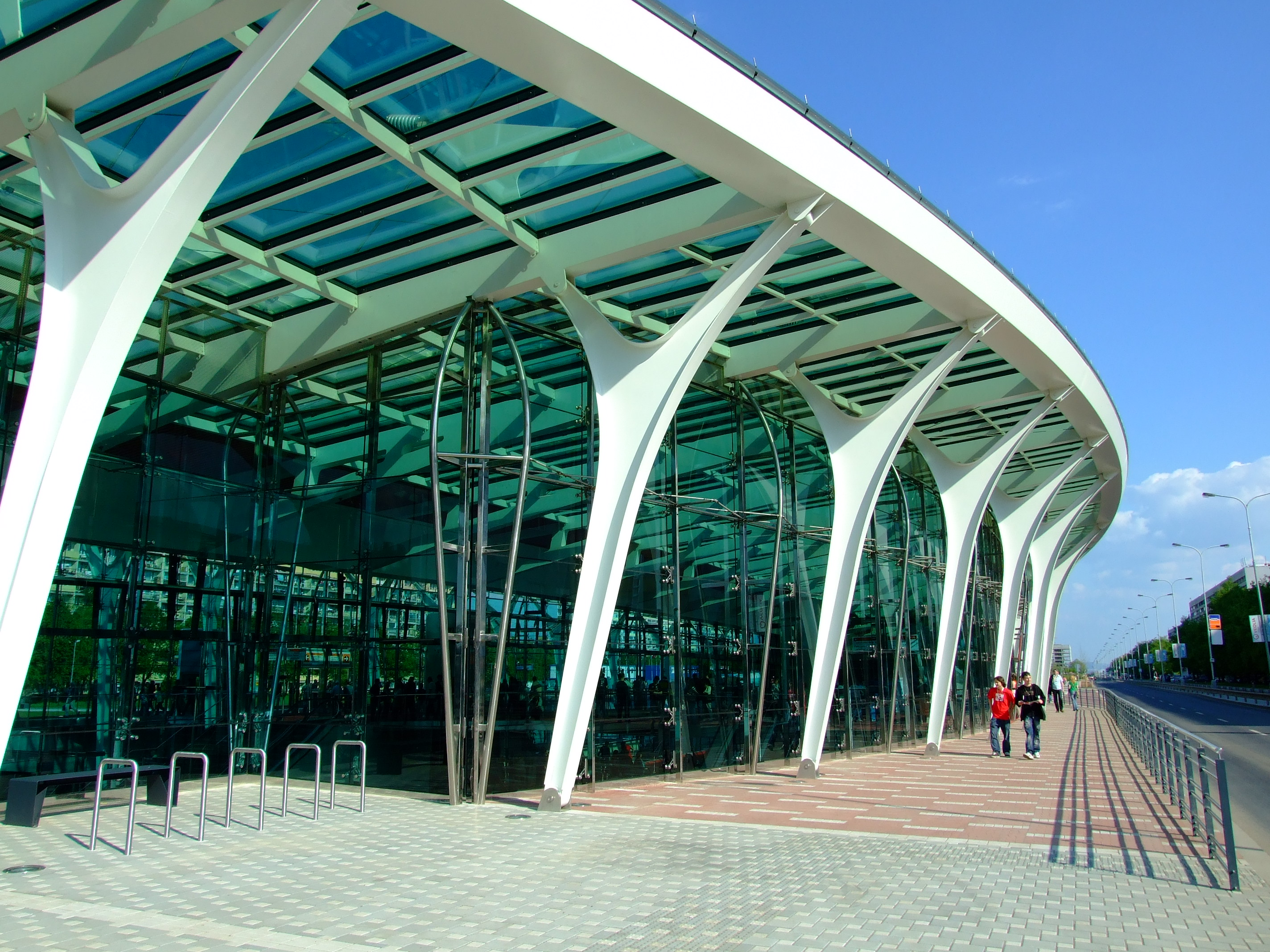
Střížkov metro station, external design
