= Nádraží Holešovice (Prague Metro) =

Prague metro station

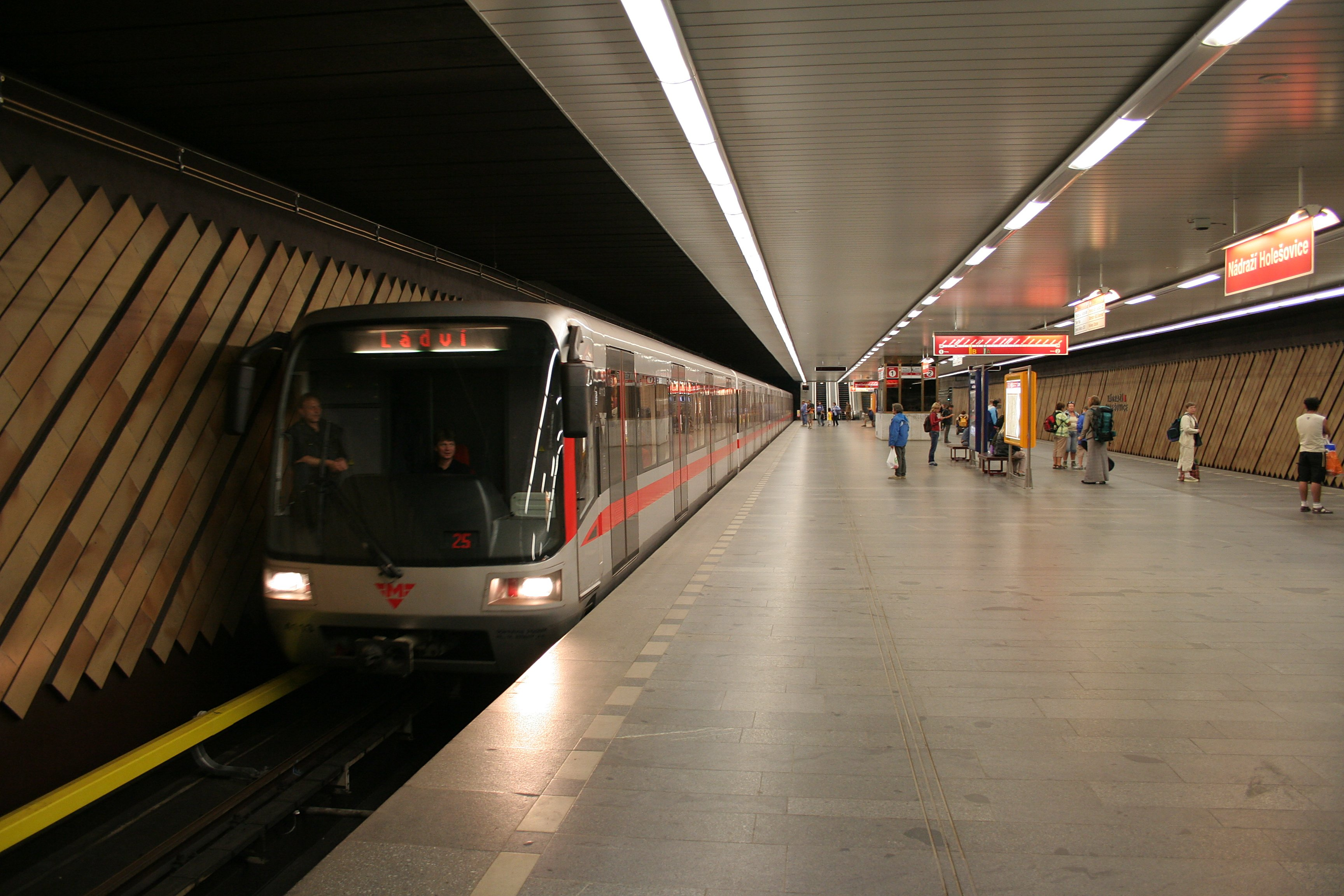
- Nádraží Holešovice metro station

General information
- Location: Vrbenského; Prague 7 - Holešovice; Prague; Czech Republic
- Coordinates: 50.110°N 14.440°E
- System: Prague Metro station
- Owner: Dopravní podnik hl. m. Prahy
- Line: C
- Platforms: Island platform
- Tracks: 2

Construction
- Structure type: Underground
- Depth: 7 m (23 ft)
- Platform levels: 1
- Cycle facilities: No
- Accessible: Yes

History
- Opened: 3 November 1984

Services
| Preceding station | Prague Metro | Following station |
|---|---|---|
| Kobylisy toward Letňany | Line C | Vltavská toward Háje |
Location
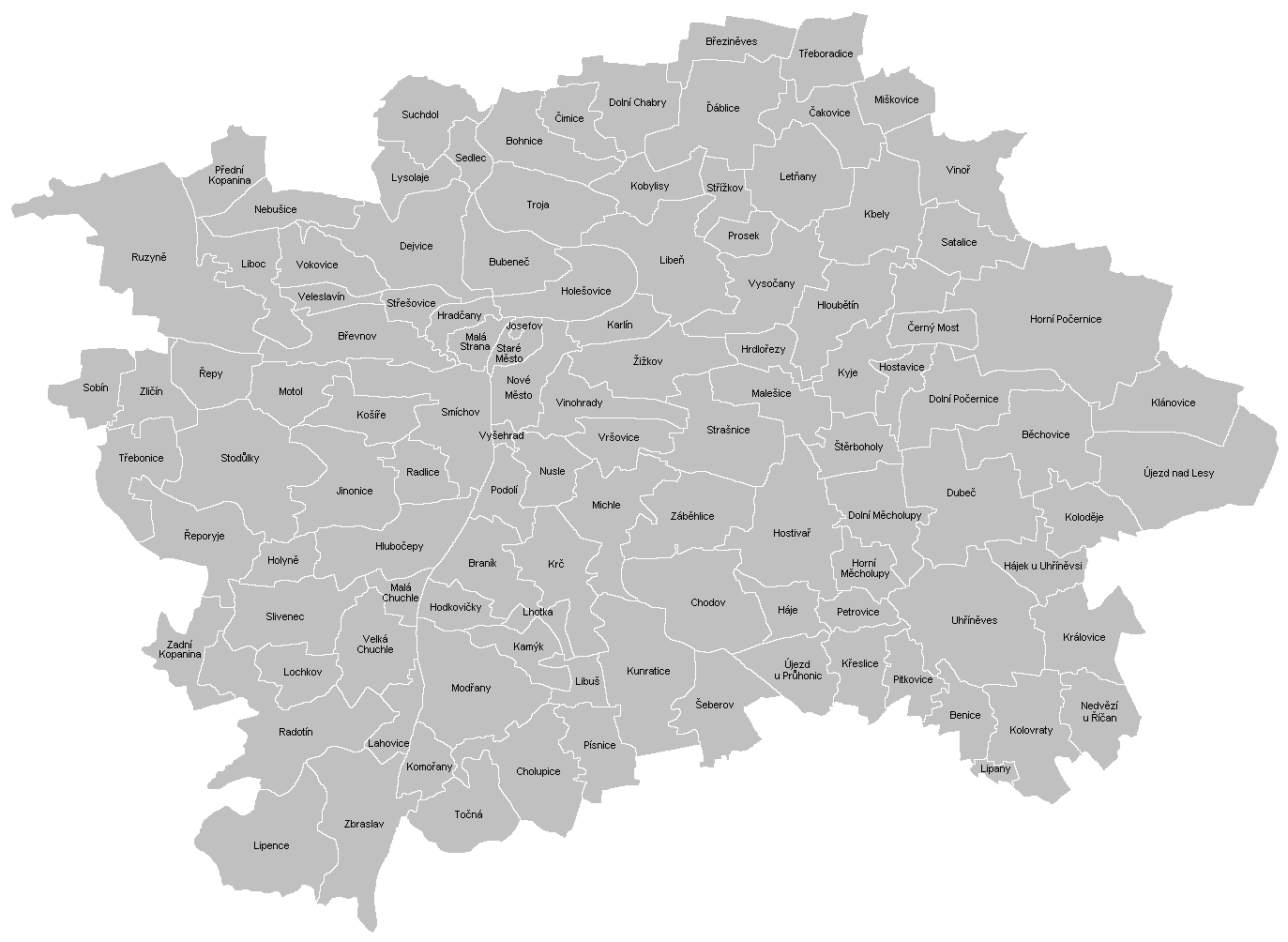
- Location within Prague Location within Greater Prague Location within Czech Republic

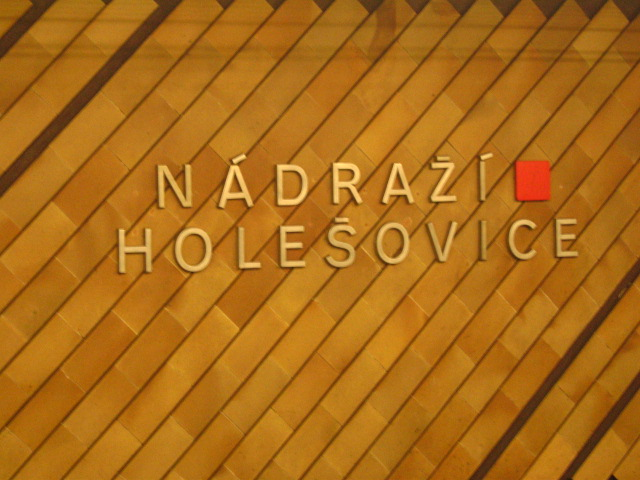
Nádraží Holešovice metro station

Nádraží Holešovice (Czech pronunciation: [ˈnaːdraʒiː ˈɦolɛʃovɪtsɛ]) is a Prague Metro station on Line C, serving the Holešovice mainline railway station.

The station was known as Fučíkova after journalist Julius Fučík until 22 February 1990. The names Vrbenského and Partyzánská were also considered. The station was opened on 3 November 1984 as the northern terminus of Section III.C (the extension from Sokolovská, now named Florenc), a status it retained until 26 June 2004 when the line was extended to Ládví station, before it was extended to Letňany station in 2008.

== Description ==
The station is an underground station with two turning tracks and two concourses. It is located just 7 metres below ground, which posed significant challenges for the engineers working on the construction of Section IV.C1 between 2000 and 2004; ultimately, they had to bend the siding tracks downward so that the line could pass under the River Vltava at all. (The original plans from the 1980s had called for the Vltava to be crossed by a bridge.) The floods of August 2002 inundated the station, and the water subsequently seeped into the construction site for the extension and into the already completed and drained tunnels under the Vltava (which had been opened to the public shortly before during an open day).

There are two exits from the platform—the southern one on Plynární street, which leads via escalators to a glass-enclosed above-ground concourse connecting to the tram stop and bus terminal (until 2004, a major transfer point for public transportation from the housing estates in Severní Město; for more, click here) and the northern exit on Vrbenského street, which leads via a fixed staircase (a new elevator was also added in July 2023) to the departure hall of the Praha-Holešovice railway station. The station was built in the early 1980s at a total cost of 319 million Kčs.
