= Prosek (Prague) =

Neighbourhood in Prague, Czech Republic

- Cadastral Area of Prague
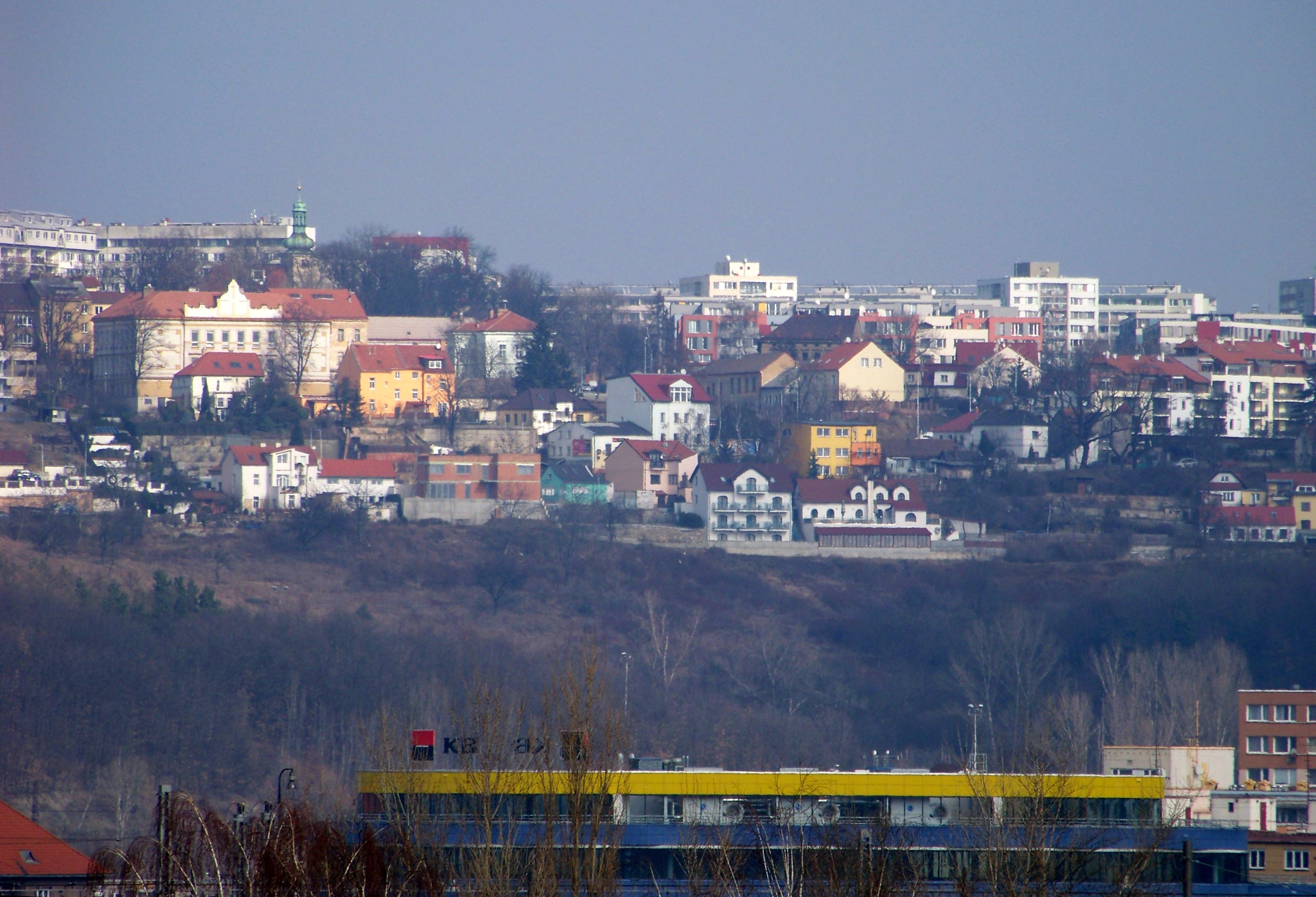
- View of Prosek from the south

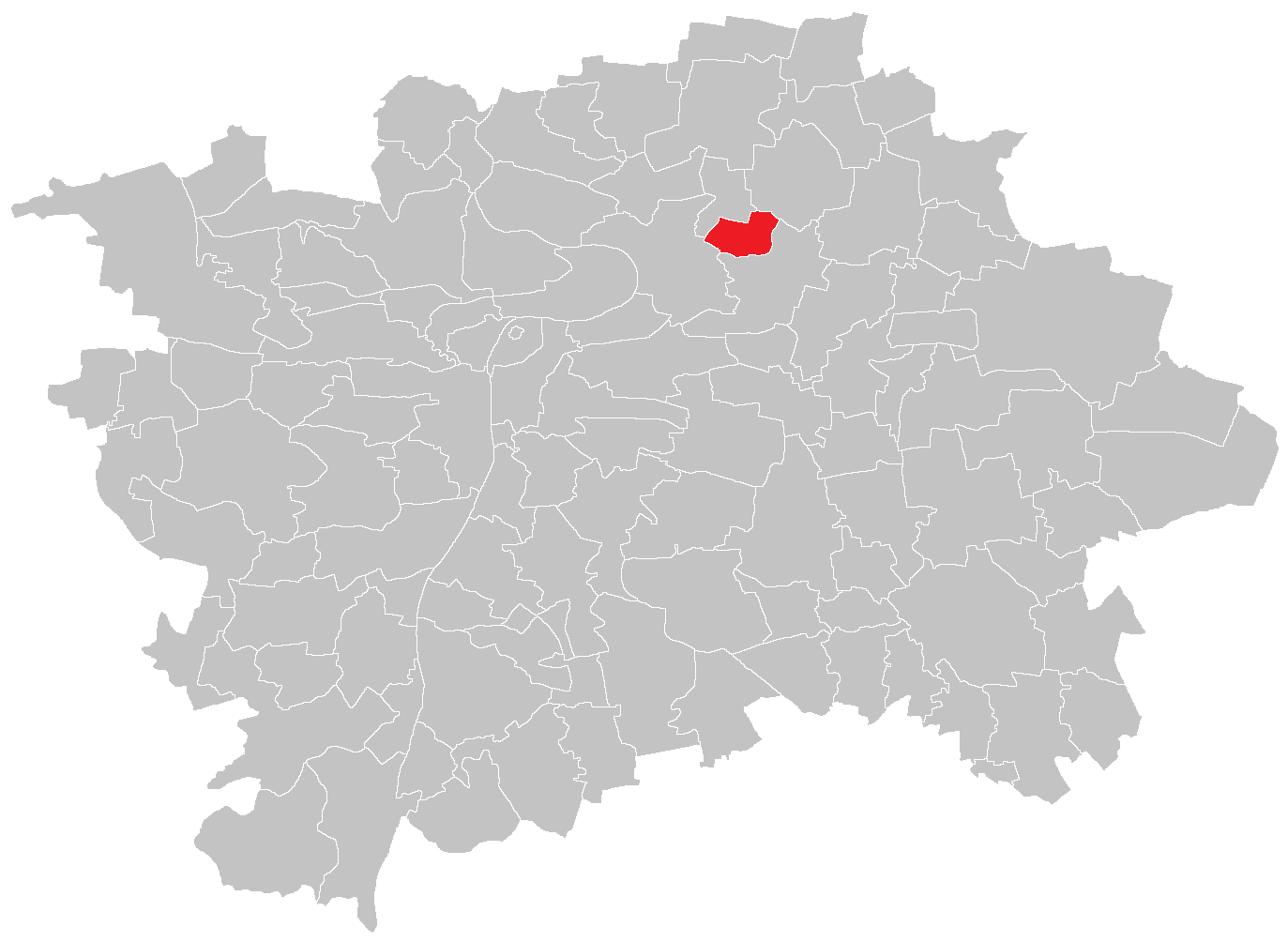
- Location of Prosek in Prague
- Coordinates: 50°07′10″N 14°29′51″E
- Country: Czech Republic
- Region: Prague
- District: Prague 9

Area
  - Total: 1.68 km^{2} (0.65 sq mi)

Population (2021)
  - Total: 16,850
  - Density: 10,000/km^{2} (26,000/sq mi)
- Time zone: UTC+1 (CET)
  - Summer (DST): UTC+2 (CEST)
- Postal code: 190 00

Prosek (German: Prossek) is a district and cadastral area in the north of Prague, Czech Republic. It is part of the Prague 9 administrative district and is bordered by Střížkov to the west, Letňany to the north, Vysočany to the south, Libeň to the southwest, and Prague–Kbely Airport to the east. Prosek has a population of 17,463 (2011).

The area is home to a large panel housing estate, which was completed in 1971. In 2008, a Prague Metro station was opened in the district with a new office complex, Prosek Point, built next to it.

== Demographics ==
Historical population

Year	Pop.	±%
1869	377	—
1880	454	+20.4%
1890	562	+23.8%
1900	1,622	+188.6%
1910	2,164	+33.4%

Year	Pop.	±%
1921	1,977	−8.6%
1930	3,647	+84.5%
1950	4,273	+17.2%
1961	4,521	+5.8%
1970	10,667	+135.9%

Year	Pop.	±%
1980	20,607	+93.2%
1991	16,372	−20.6%
2001	15,018	−8.3%
2011	17,463	+16.3%
2021	16,850	−3.5%

Source: Censuses
