= Kobylisy =

- Cadastral Area of Prague
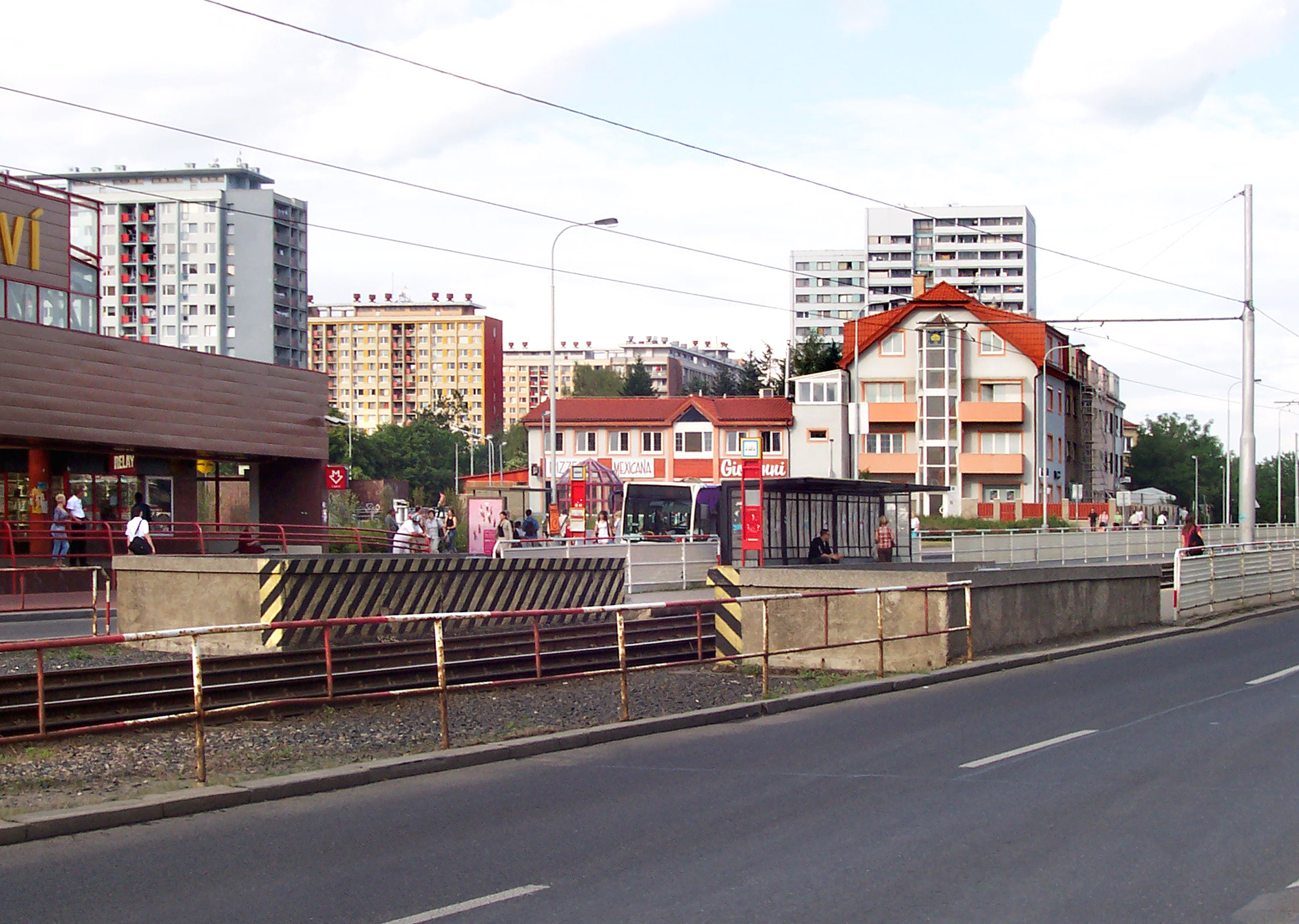
- Kobylisy: Ládví subway and Ďáblice housing estate

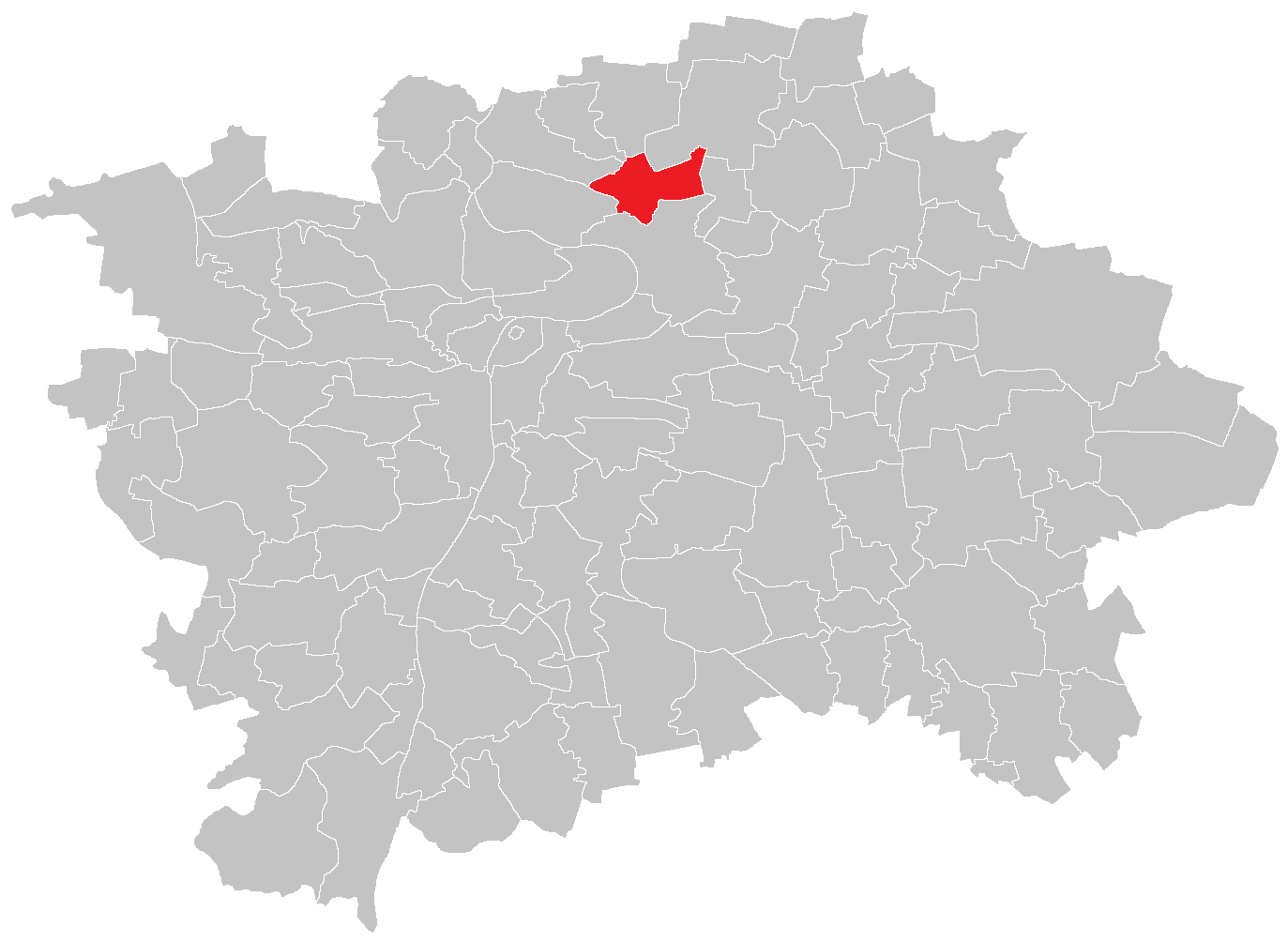
- Location of Kobylisy in Prague
- Coordinates: 50°07′45″N 14°27′49″E
- Country: Czech Republic
- Region: Prague
- District: Prague 8

Area
  - Total: 3.23 km^{2} (1.25 sq mi)

Population (2021)
  - Total: 27,030
  - Density: 8,370/km^{2} (21,700/sq mi)
- Time zone: UTC+1 (CET)
  - Summer (DST): UTC+2 (CEST)

Kobylisy is a cadastral district in the north of Prague, located in Prague 8. The eastern part of the district is home to a large panel housing estate with over 10,000 residents. The area is served by Kobylisy and Ládví stations on the Prague Metro, both of which opened in 2004.

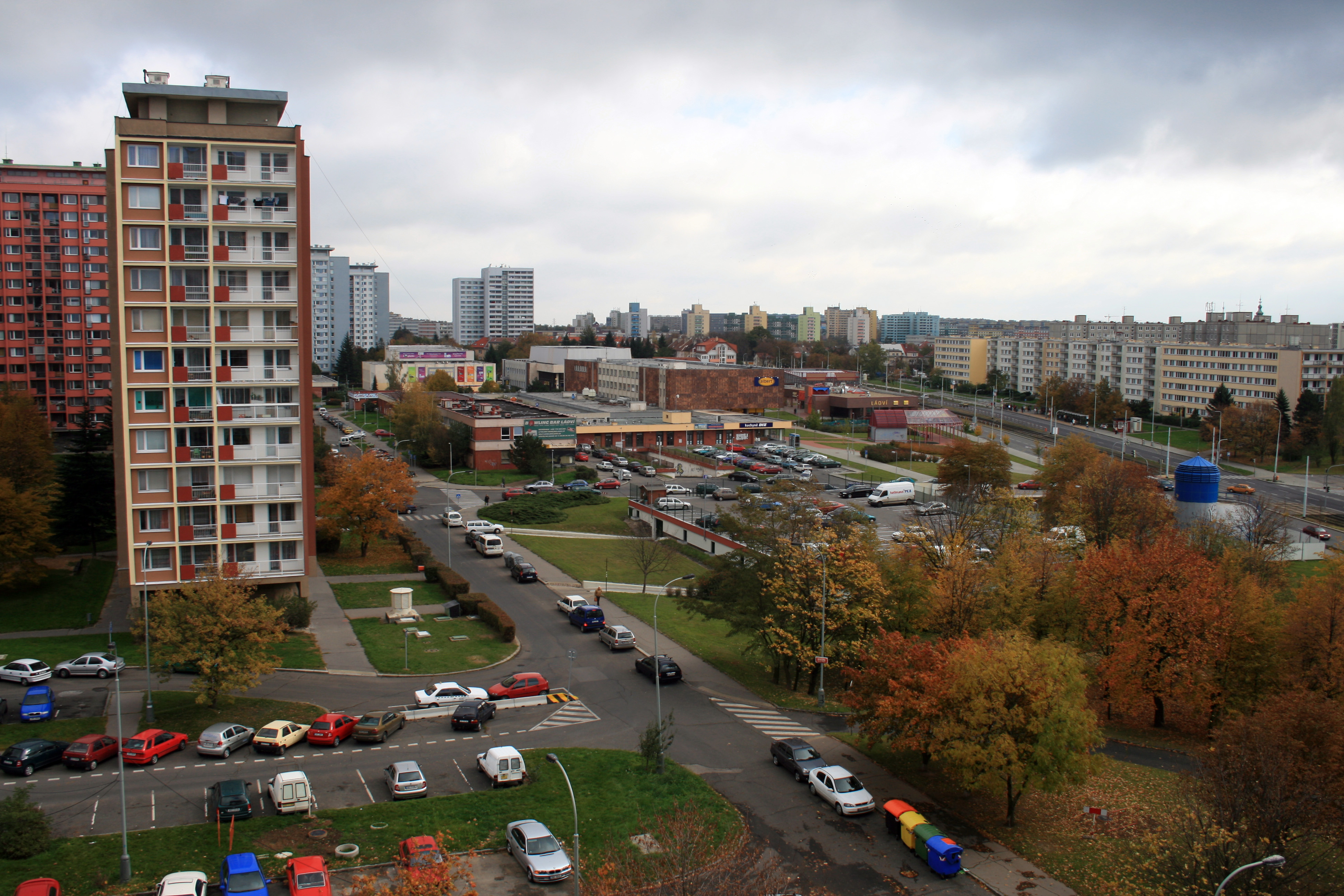
Ládví is a Ládví station on Line C, located in Kobylisy, Prague 8

== History ==
- May 27, 1942, a successful assassination of Reinhard Heydrich during the Operation Anthropoid.
- During World War II people were executed in Kobylisy Shooting Range

== Demographics ==
Historical population

Year	Pop.	±%
1869	428	—
1880	565	+32.0%
1890	876	+55.0%
1900	2,125	+142.6%
1910	3,199	+50.5%

Year	Pop.	±%
1921	3,384	+5.8%
1930	5,881	+73.8%
1950	10,308	+75.3%
1961	12,744	+23.6%
1970	11,061	−13.2%

Year	Pop.	±%
1980	37,013	+234.6%
1991	32,903	−11.1%
2001	29,299	−11.0%
2011	28,657	−2.2%
2021	27,030	−5.7%

Source: Censuses
