= Malešice =

- Cadastral Area of Prague
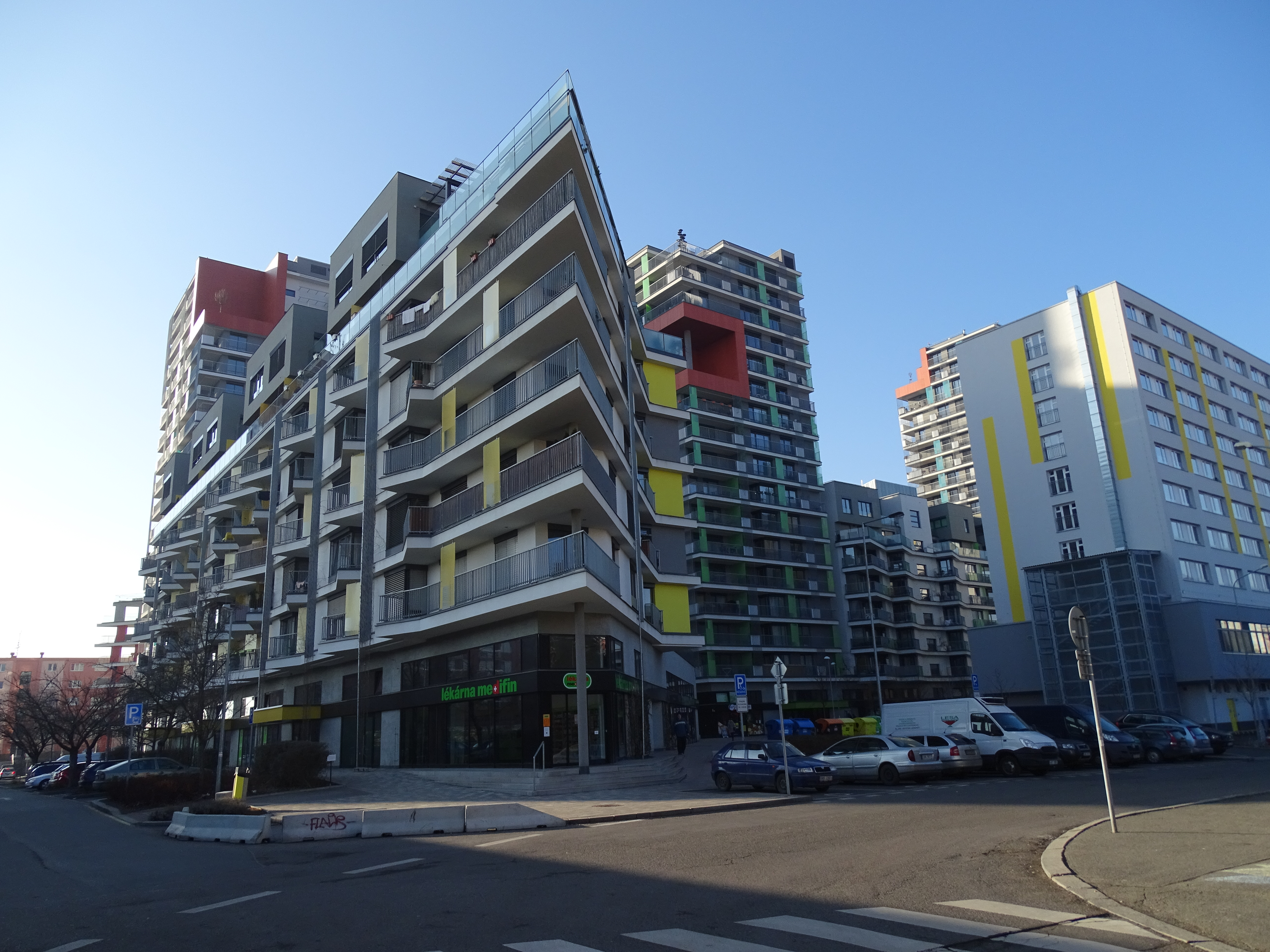
- Blockhouses

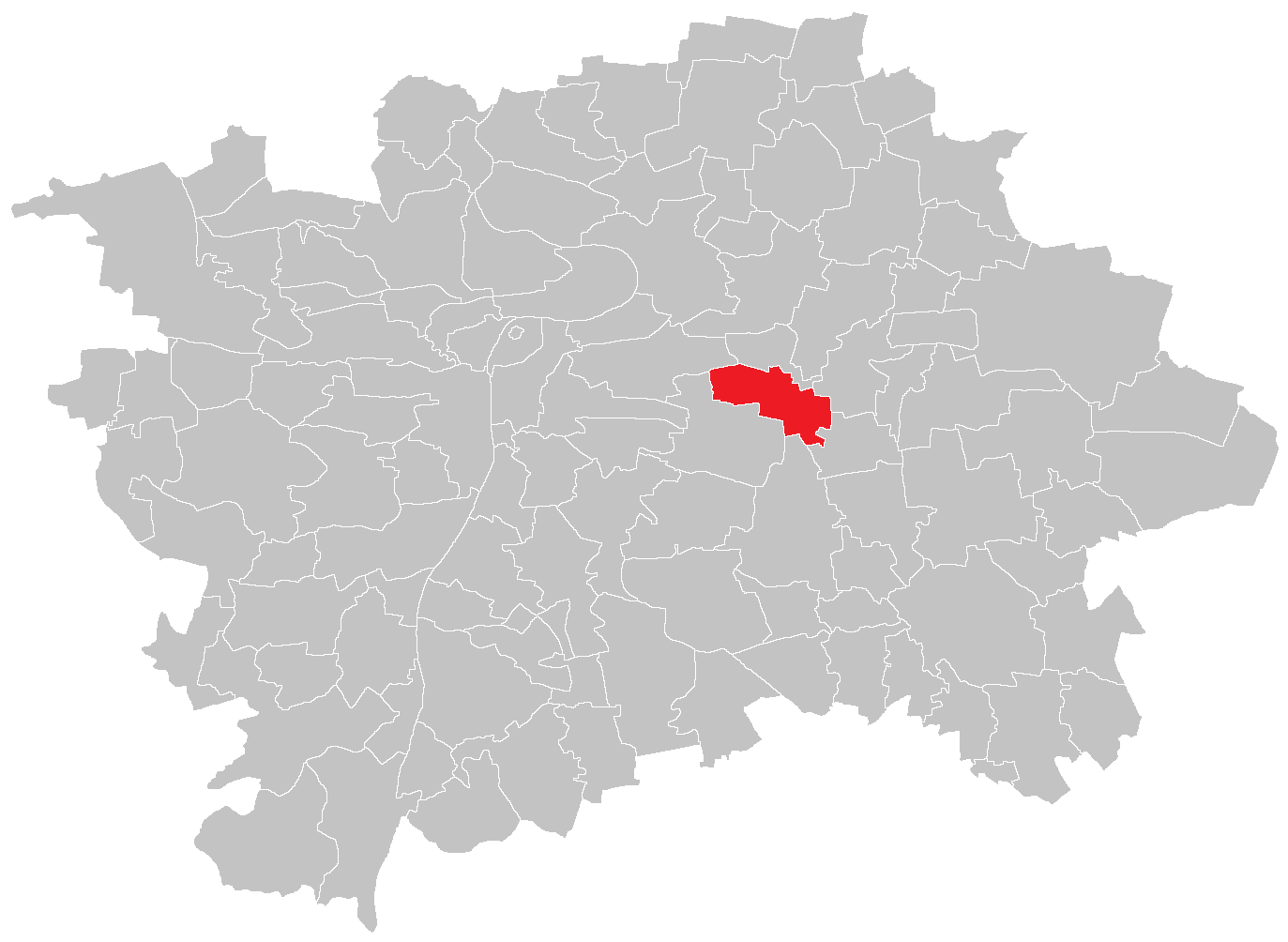
- Location of Malešice in Prague
- Coordinates: 50°05′00″N 14°31′03″E
- Country: Czech Republic
- Region: Prague
- District: Prague 9, Prague 10

Area
  - Total: 3.82 km^{2} (1.47 sq mi)

Population (2021)
  - Total: 11,237
  - Density: 2,940/km^{2} (7,620/sq mi)
- Time zone: UTC+1 (CET)
  - Summer (DST): UTC+2 (CEST)
- Postal code: 108 00

Malešice is a cadastral district in Prague. The earliest reference about the village is from 1309. It became a part of Prague on 1 January 1922. It lies mostly in the administrative district of Prague 10 while a small part is in Prague 9. The district is bordered by Strašnice, Žižkov, Hrdlořezy, Kyje, Štěrboholy and Hostivař. The population is over 11,000 as of the 2021 census.

== Demographics ==
Historical population

Year	Pop.	±%
1869	303	—
1880	444	+46.5%
1890	455	+2.5%
1900	824	+81.1%
1910	1,114	+35.2%
1921	1,371	+23.1%
1930	2,527	+84.3%
1950	2,328	−7.9%

Year	Pop.	±%
1961	2,465	+5.9%
1970	13,780	+459.0%
1980	12,742	−7.5%
1991	10,915	−14.3%
2001	9,659	−11.5%
2011	10,725	+11.0%
2021	11,237	+4.8%

Source: Censuses
