= Kobylisy (Prague Metro) =

Prague metro station

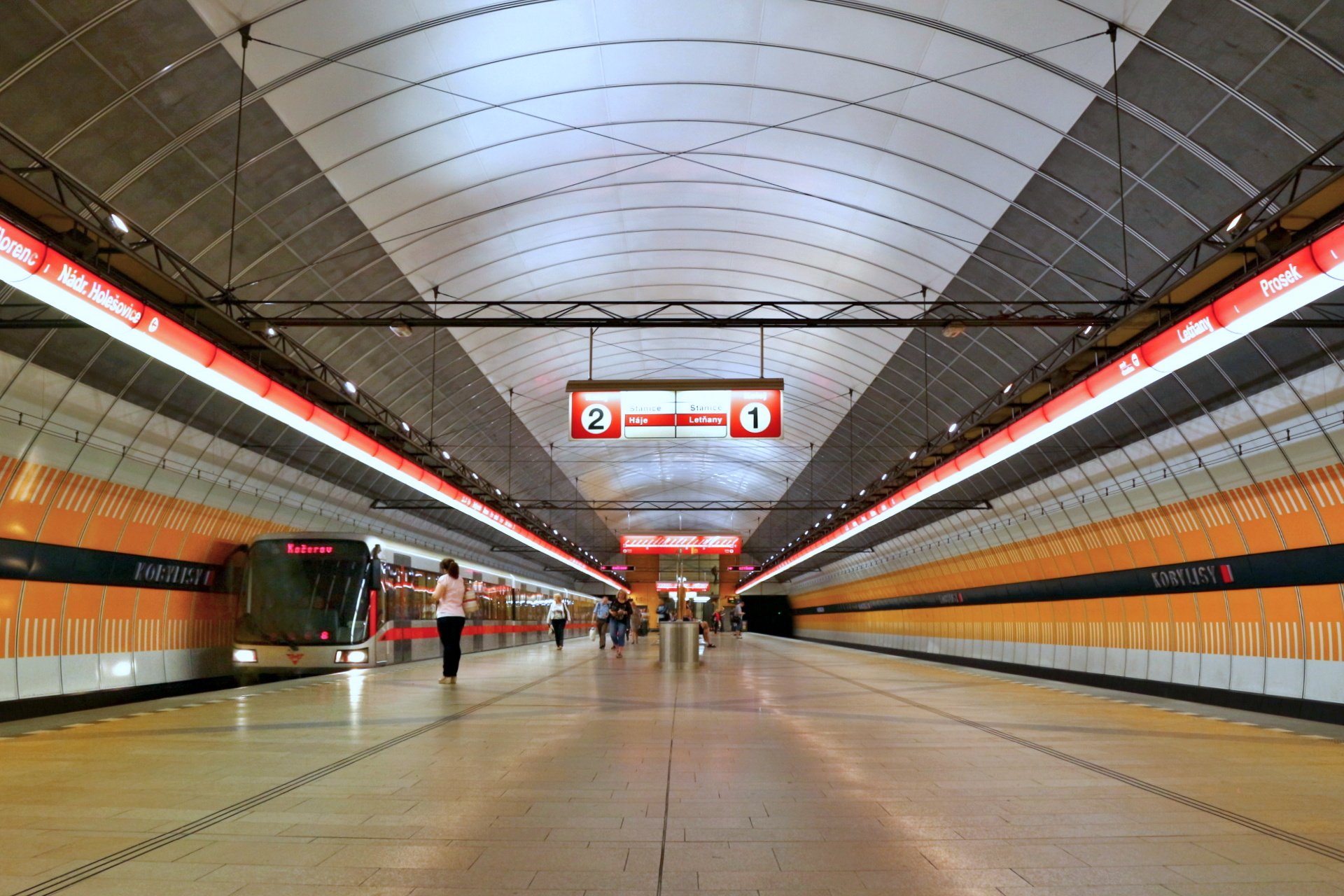
- Kobylisy station

General information
- Location: Kobylisy; Prague 8 Prague; Czechia
- Coordinates: 50.123°N 14.452°E
- System: Prague Metro station
- Owner: Dopravní podnik hl. m. Prahy
- Line: C
- Platforms: Island platform
- Tracks: 2

Construction
- Structure type: Underground
- Depth: 31.5 m (103 ft)
- Platform levels: 1
- Cycle facilities: No
- Accessible: Yes

History
- Opened: 26 June 2004

Services
Preceding station	Prague Metro	Following station
Ládví toward Letňany	Line C	Nádraží Holešovice toward Háje
Location
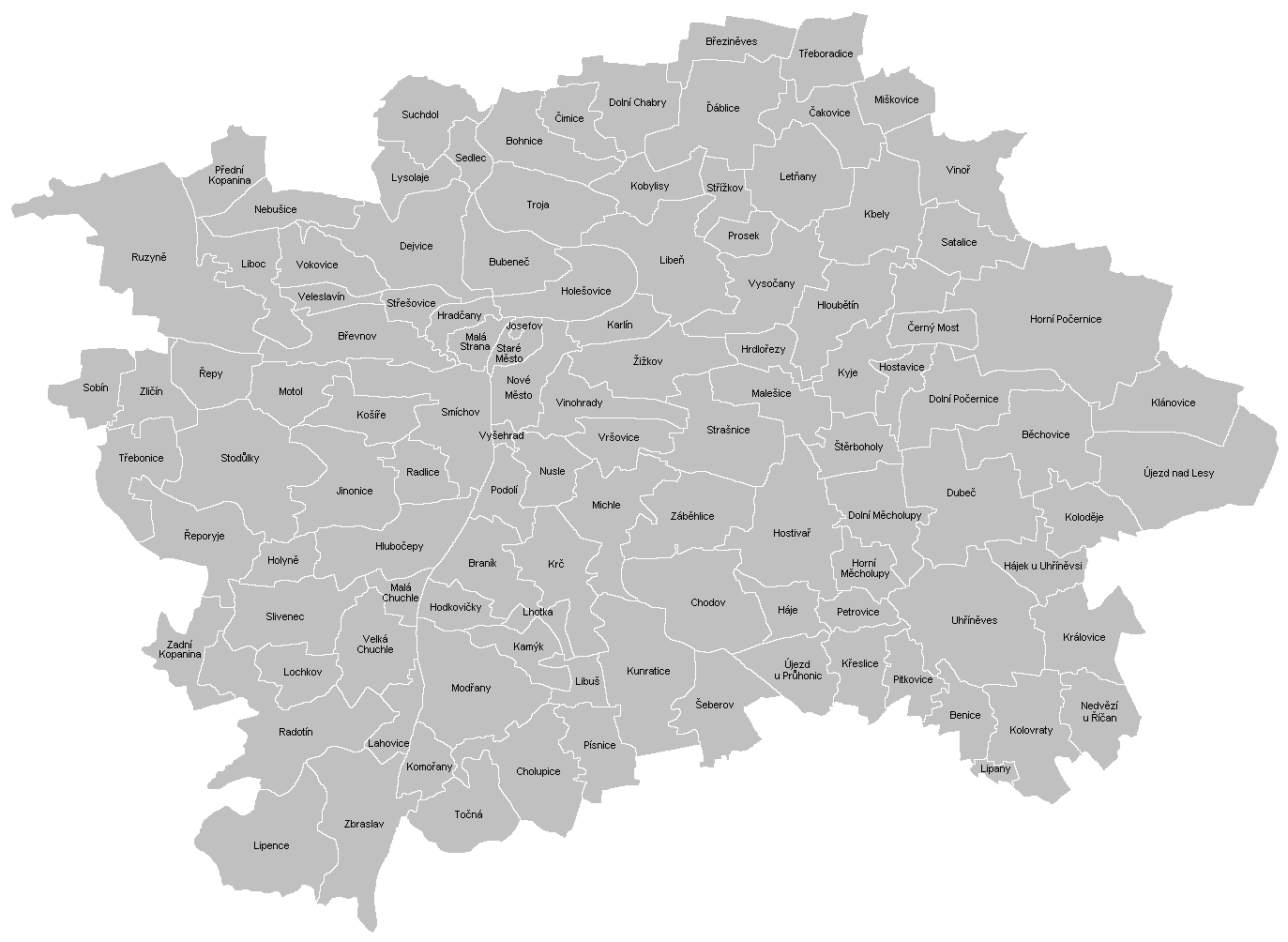
- Location within Prague Location within Greater Prague Location within Czech Republic

Kobylisy (Czech pronunciation: [ˈkobɪlɪsɪ]) is a Prague Metro station on Line C, located in the district of Kobylisy. The station was opened on 26 June 2004 as part of the Line C extension from Nádraží Holešovice to Ládví. According to plans drawn up before the Velvet Revolution, the station was originally going to be called Rudé armády (Red Army).

== Location ==
The station is situated between the Nádraží Holešovice and Ládví stations. At 2,748 meters, the Nádraží Holešovice–Kobylisy section is the longest distance between stations in the Prague Metro. Until this section opened, the longest distance between stations was on the Smíchovské nádraží–Radlická section of Line B. This station is 31.5m deep; the deepest on Line C.

== Gallery ==
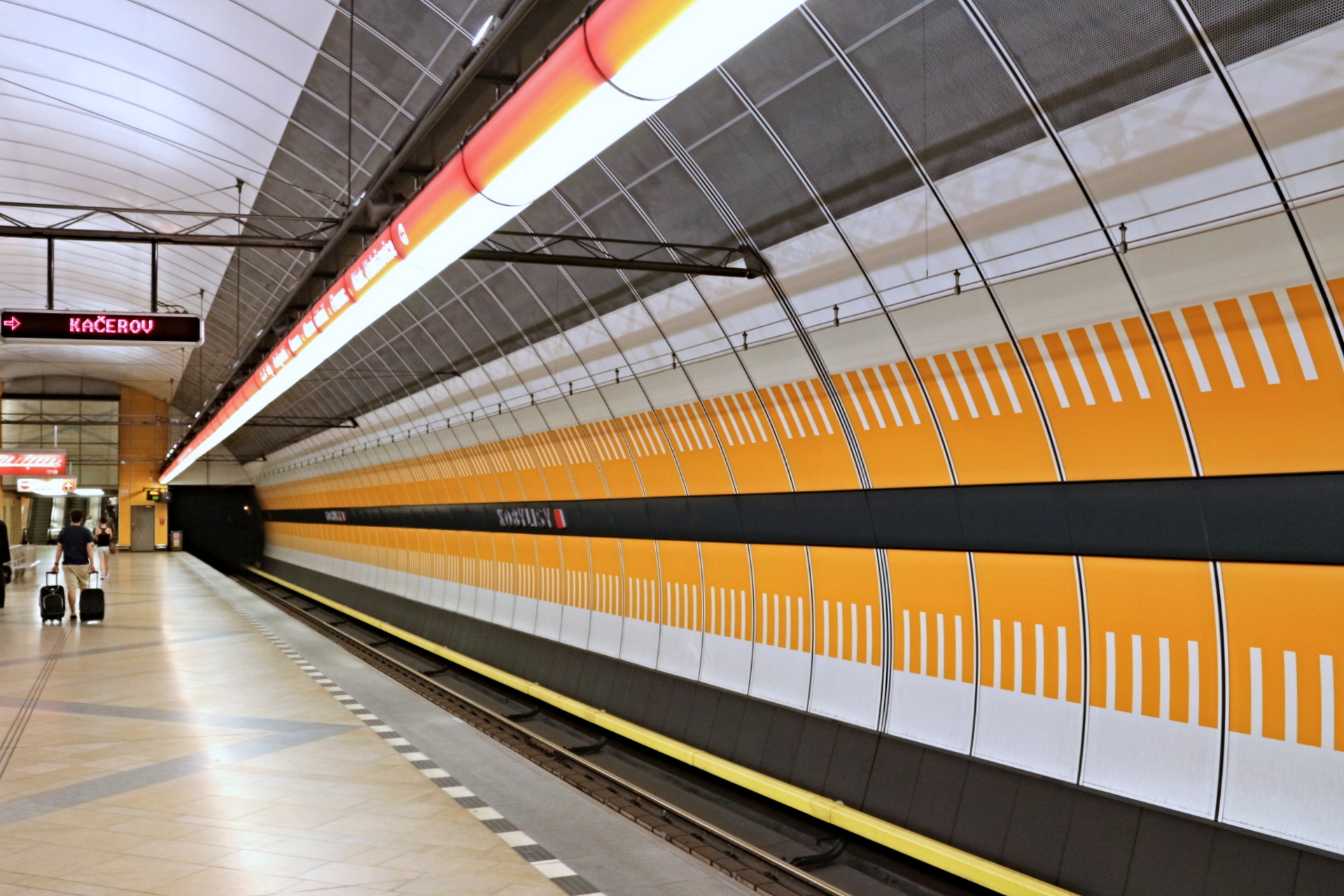
Kobylisy station,
platform 1 (northbound)

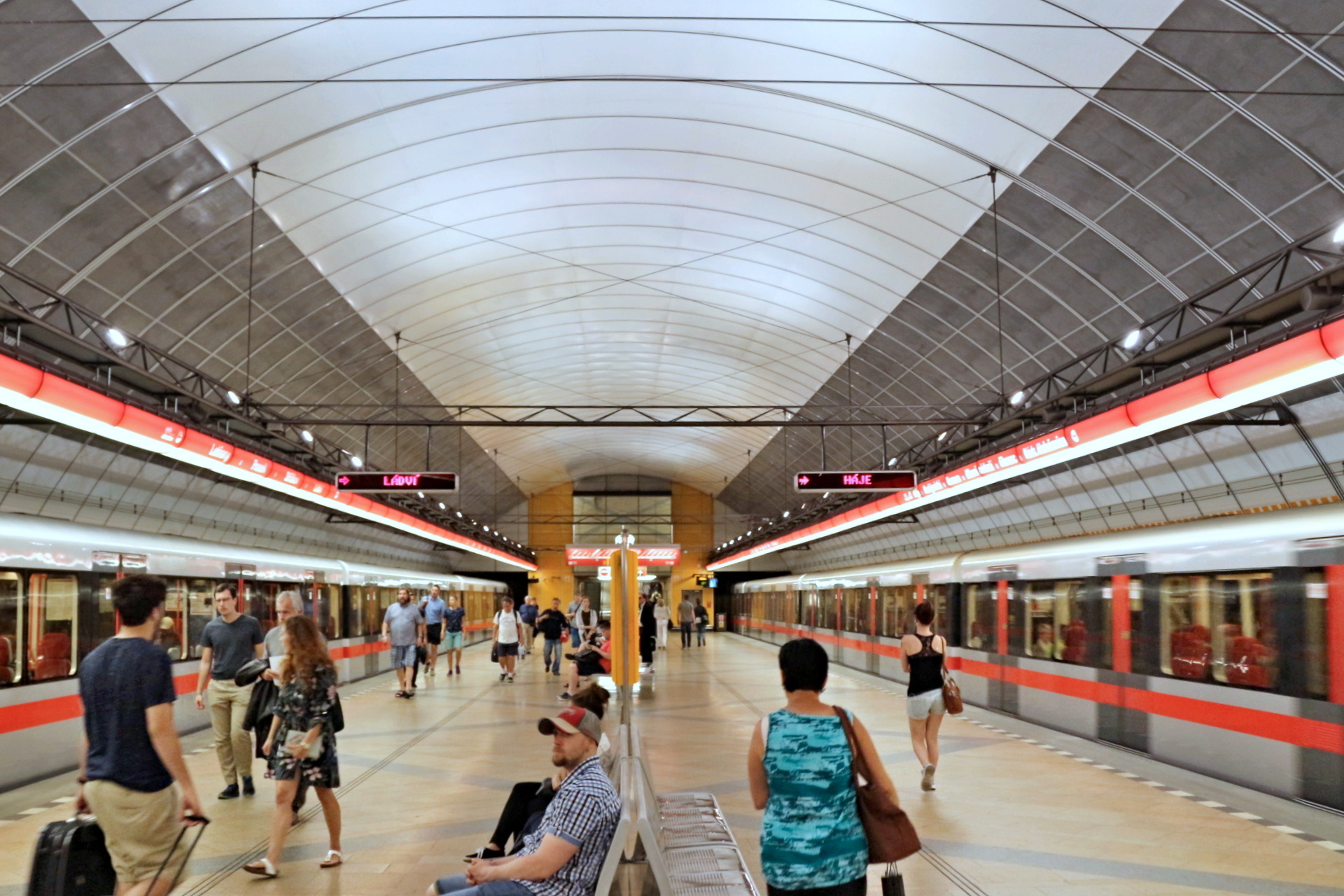
Kobylisy station, platforms (view: southbound)

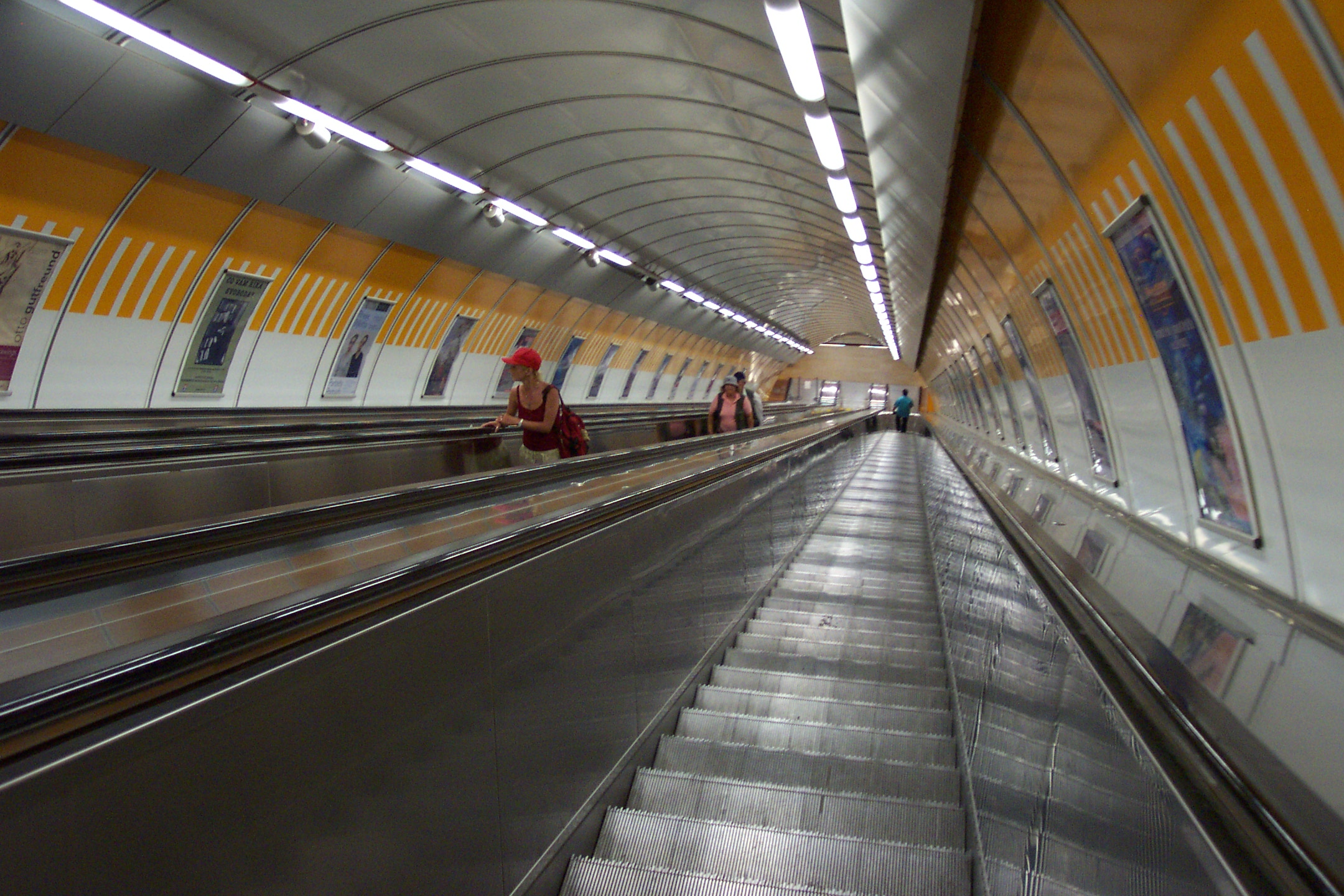
Kobylisy station, escalator tunnel (east)

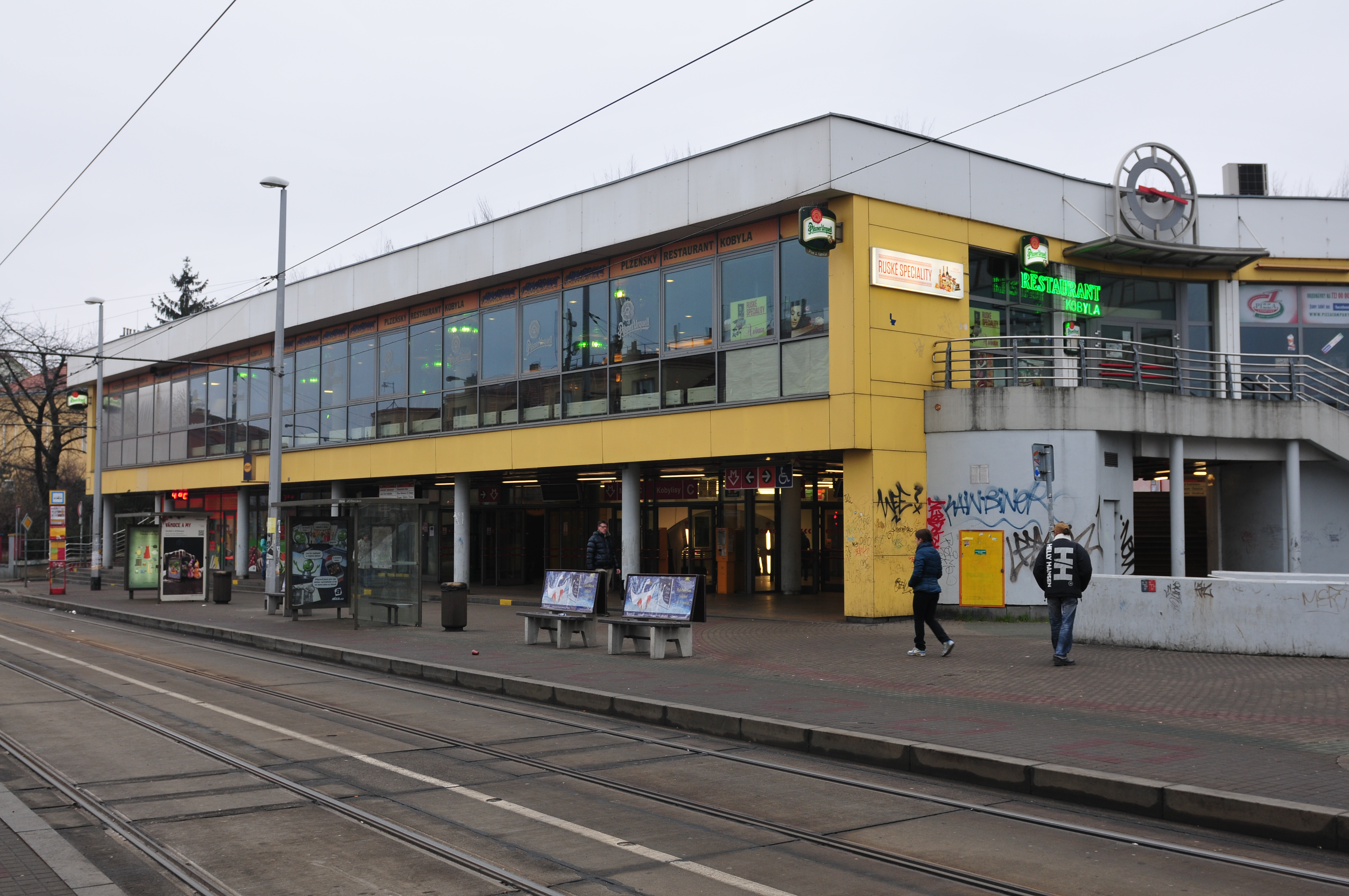
Kobylisy station,
east entrance
