= Hrdlořezy (Prague) =

- Cadastral Area of Prague
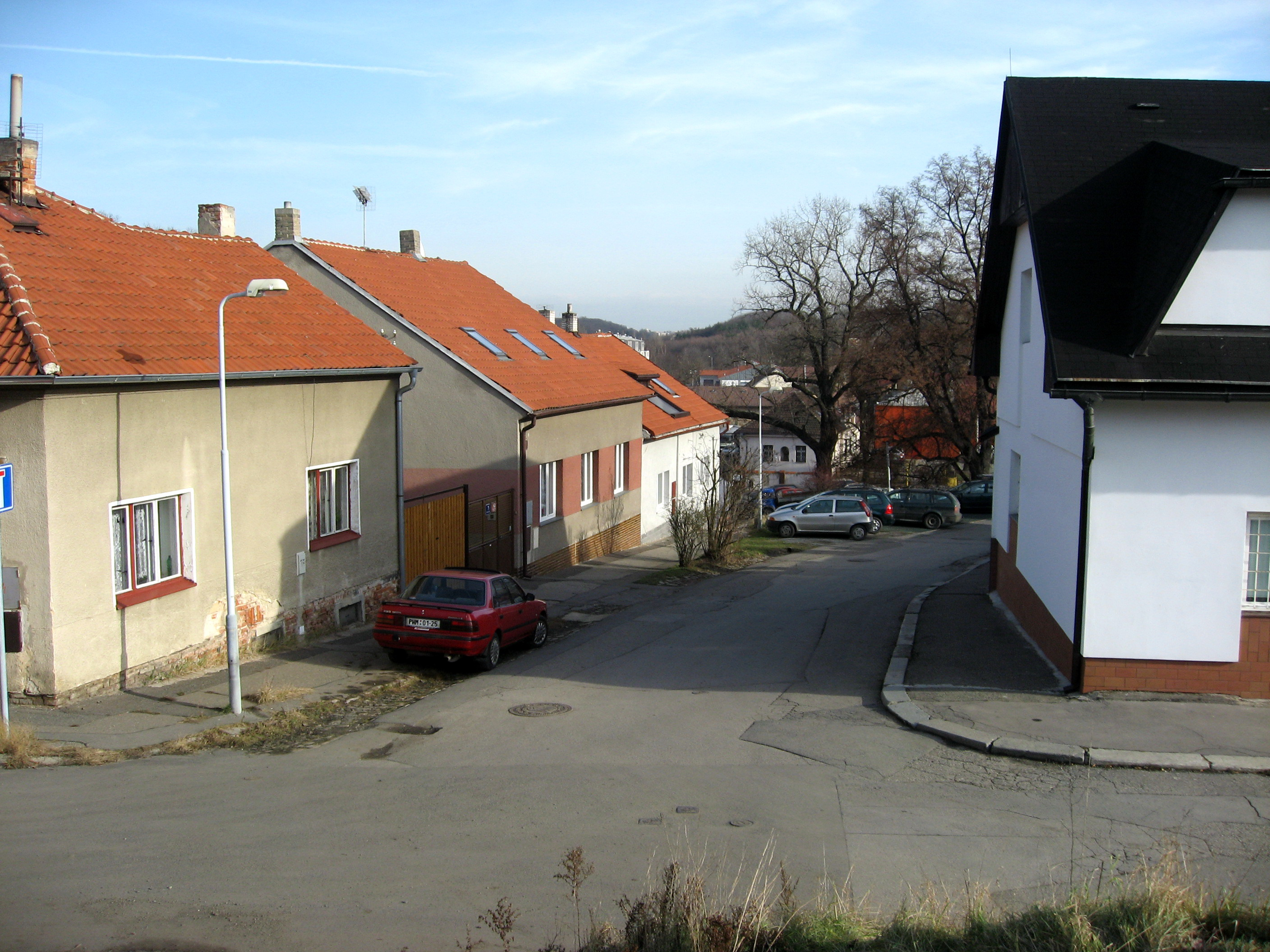
- Family houses in Hrdlořezy

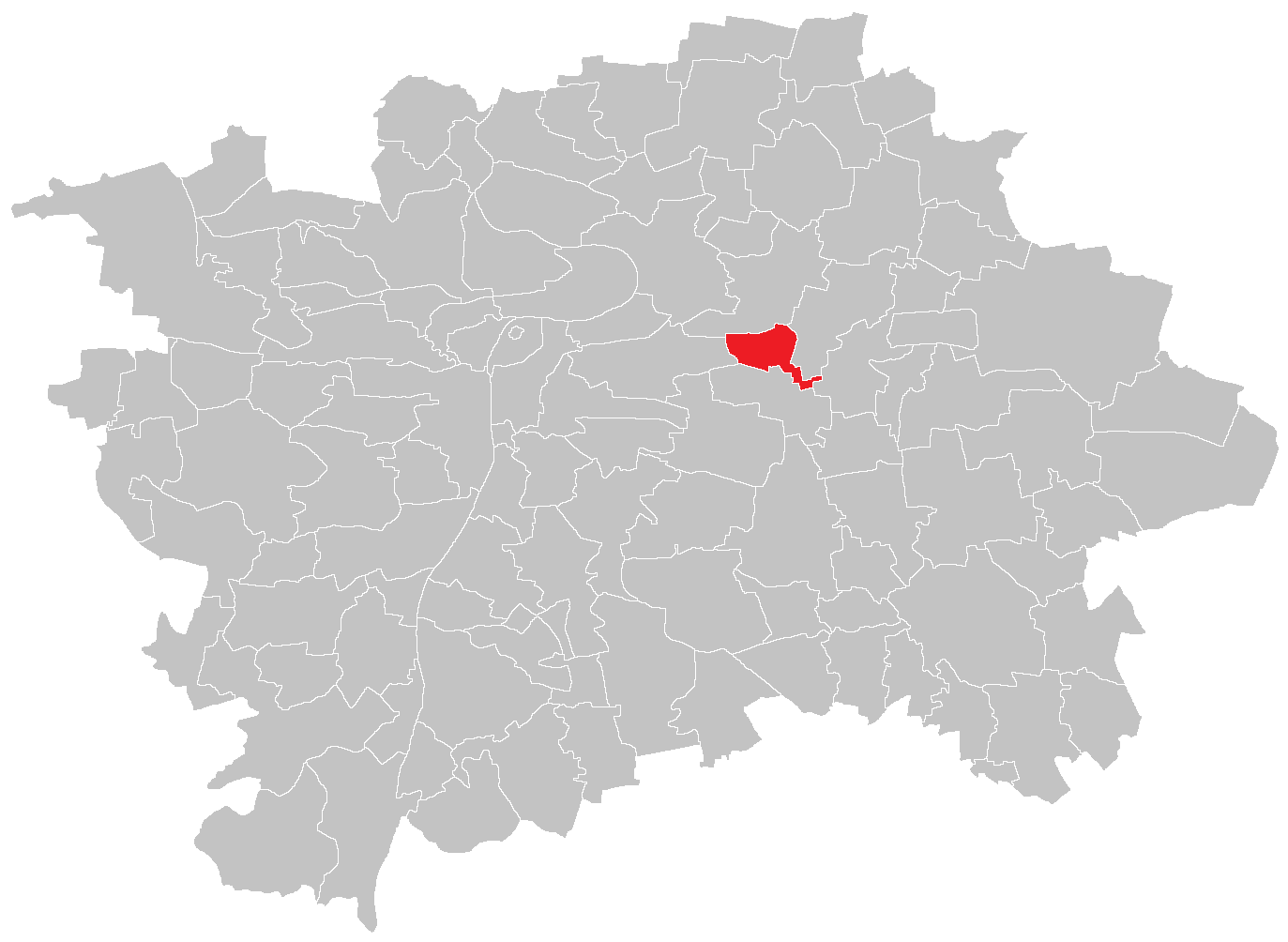
- Coordinates: 50°5′40″N 14°30′50″E
- Country: Czech Republic
- City: Prague 9, Prague 10
- District: Prague 10
- Incorporated into Prague: 1922

Area
  - Total: 1.96 km^{2} (0.76 sq mi)

Population (2021)
  - Total: 2,912
  - Density: 1,490/km^{2} (3,850/sq mi)

Hrdlořezy is a catastral district in Prague. It has population of 1,666. It became part of Prague on 1 January 1922. It lies mostly in the municipal and administrative district of Prague 9 while a small part is in Prague 10. The district is bordered by Žižkov, Vysočany, Hloubětín, Kyje and Malešice.

== Demographics ==
Historical population

Year	Pop.	±%
1869	295	—
1880	370	+25.4%
1890	494	+33.5%
1900	1,007	+103.8%
1910	1,655	+64.3%
1921	1,806	+9.1%
1930	2,194	+21.5%
1950	1,595	−27.3%

Year	Pop.	±%
1961	1,497	−6.1%
1970	994	−33.6%
1980	694	−30.2%
1991	488	−29.7%
2001	366	−25.0%
2011	1,351	+269.1%
2021	2,912	+115.5%

Source: Censuses
