= Střížkov =

- Cadastral Area of Prague
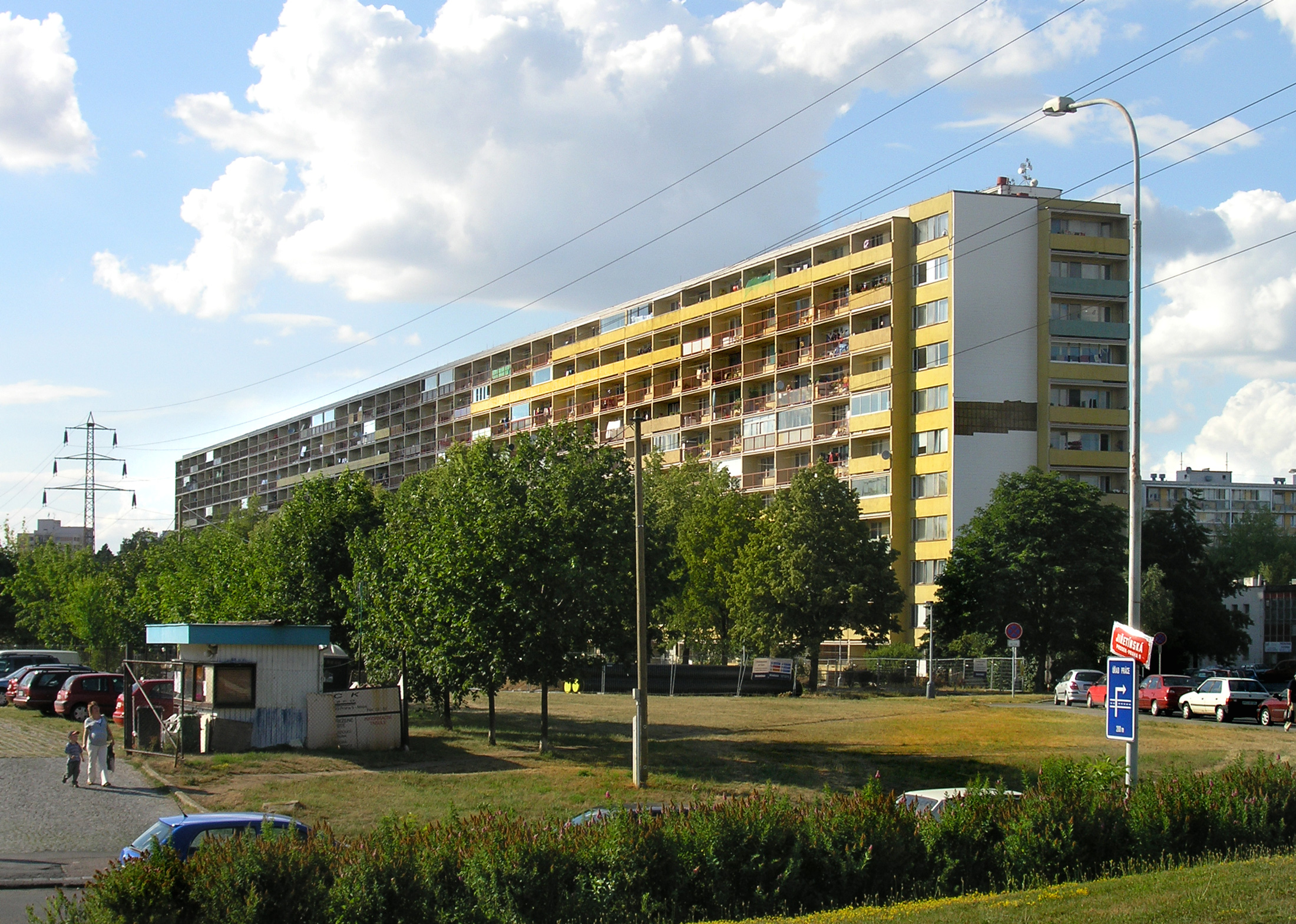
- Prosek housing estate

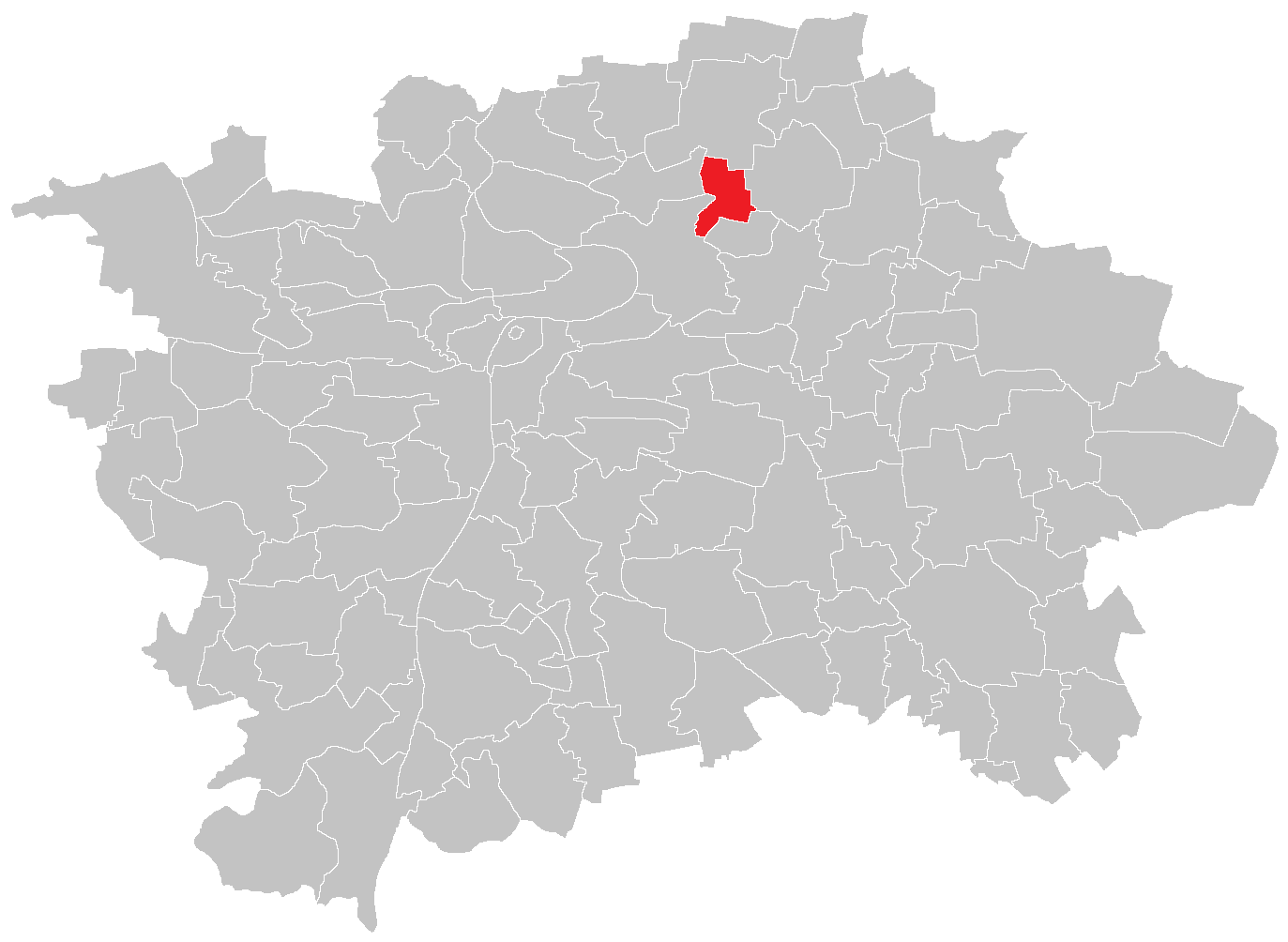
- Location of Střížkov in Prague
- Coordinates: 50°07′40″N 14°29′26″E
- Country: Czech Republic
- Region: Prague
- District: Prague 8, Prague 9

Area
  - Total: 2.03 km^{2} (0.78 sq mi)

Population (2021)
  - Total: 15,705
  - Density: 7,740/km^{2} (20,000/sq mi)
- Time zone: UTC+1 (CET)
  - Summer (DST): UTC+2 (CEST)

Střížkov (German: Strischkau) is a cadastral area of Prague, Czech Republic, divided between the districts of Prague 8 and Prague 9. Střížkov has 15,705 inhabitants as of 2021.

== Demographics ==
Historical population

Year	Pop.	±%
1869	219	—
1880	223	+1.8%
1890	266	+19.3%
1900	370	+39.1%
1910	352	−4.9%
1921	351	−0.3%
1930	395	+12.5%
1950	1,282	+224.6%

Year	Pop.	±%
1961	1,360	+6.1%
1970	8,982	+560.4%
1980	17,006	+89.3%
1991	15,620	−8.2%
2001	14,141	−9.5%
2011	14,417	+2.0%
2021	15,705	+8.9%

Source: Censuses

== Transport ==
Střížkov station on the Prague Metro's Line C serves the district. There are also several buses coming through the area.

== Sport ==
The district was home to an association football club, FK Bohemians Prague (Střížkov).
