= Ládví (Prague Metro) =

Prague metro station

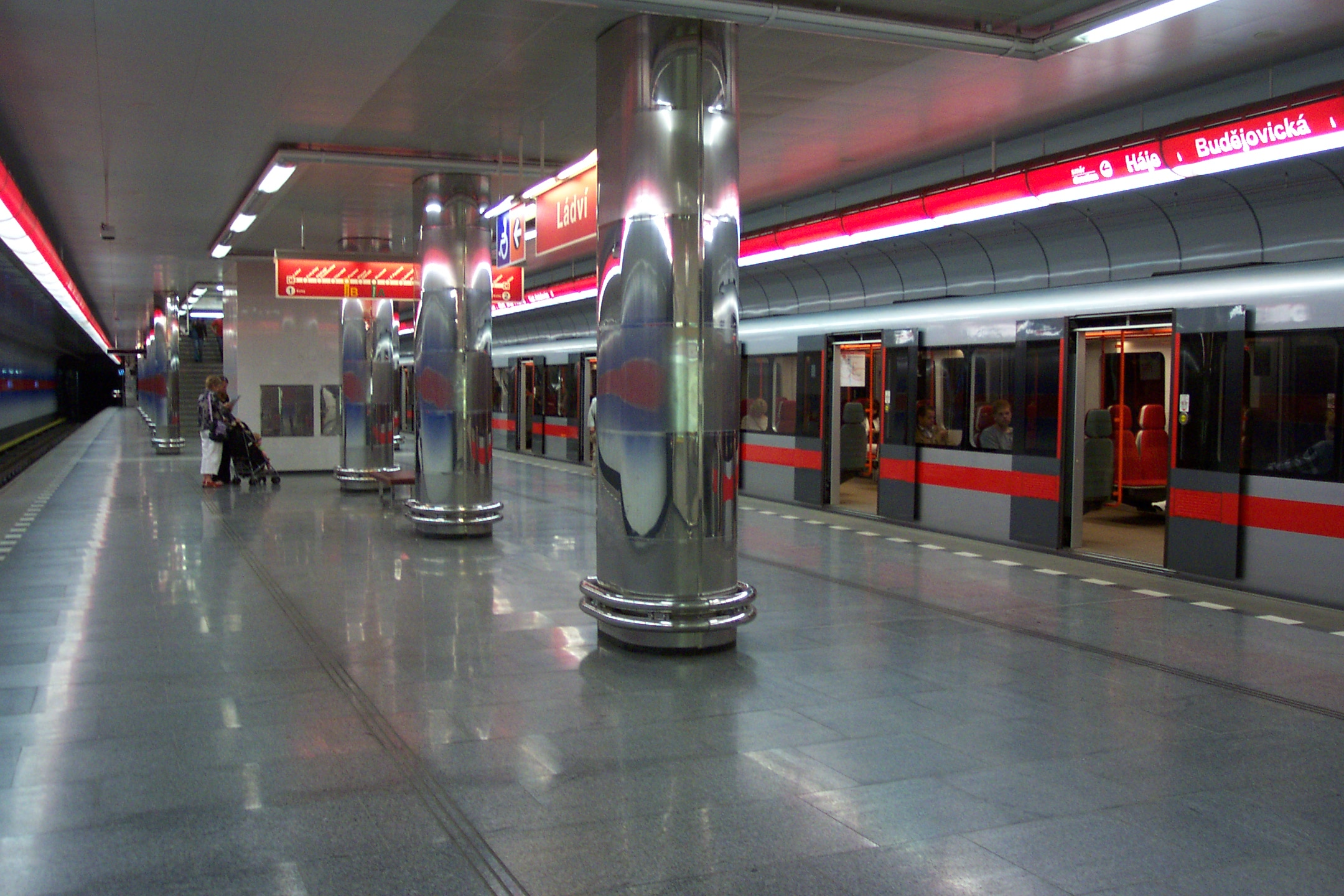
- Platform at Ládví

General information
- Location: Střelničná; Prague 8 - Kobylisy; Prague; Czechia
- Coordinates: 50.127°N 14.469°E
- System: Prague Metro station
- Owner: Dopravní podnik hl. m. Prahy
- Line: C
- Platforms: Island platform
- Tracks: 2

Construction
- Structure type: Underground
- Depth: 8.8 m (29 ft)
- Platform levels: 1
- Cycle facilities: No
- Accessible: Yes

History
- Opened: 26 June 2004

Services
Preceding station	Prague Metro	Following station
Střížkov toward Letňany	Line C	Kobylisy toward Háje
Location
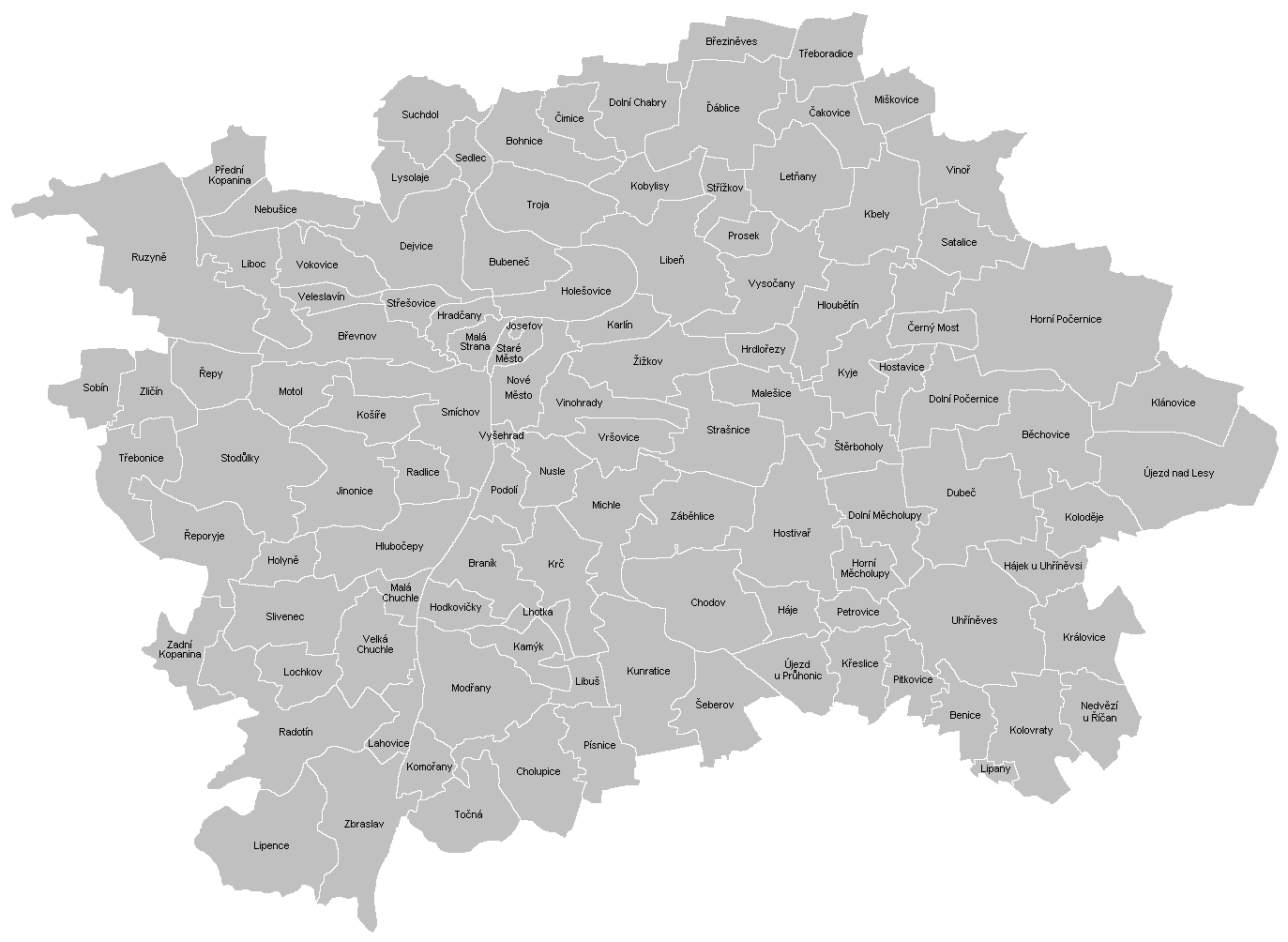
- Location within Prague Location within Greater Prague Location within Czech Republic

Ládví (Czech pronunciation: [ˈlaːdviː]) is a Prague Metro station on Line C, located in Kobylisy, Prague 8. The station was opened on 26 June 2004 as the northern terminus of the Line C extension from Nádraží Holešovice. It remained the temporary northern terminus of Line C until the line was extended to Letňany on 8 May 2008. According to the original plans, drawn up before the Velvet Revolution, the station was to be named Tankistů, in line with the planned name of the previous station, Rudá armáda.

== Features ==
The station is 8.8 metres below ground level, and contains two tracks on opposite sides of the station platform. The station has one exit in the middle leading to tram stops and a bus station.

The platform ceiling is supported by columns clad in stainless steel. The exit is similar to that at Pankrác Station—a short escalator tunnel leads upward from the center of the station along the station’s axis to the underground concourse, where exits lead to the bus and tram stops and to the residential area. There is also an elevator for people with reduced mobility and for strollers. A P+R (park-and-ride) facility is located nearby.
