= Prague 9 =

District of Prague, Czech Republic

Prague 9 Praha 9
- Municipal District of Prague; Administrative District of Prague
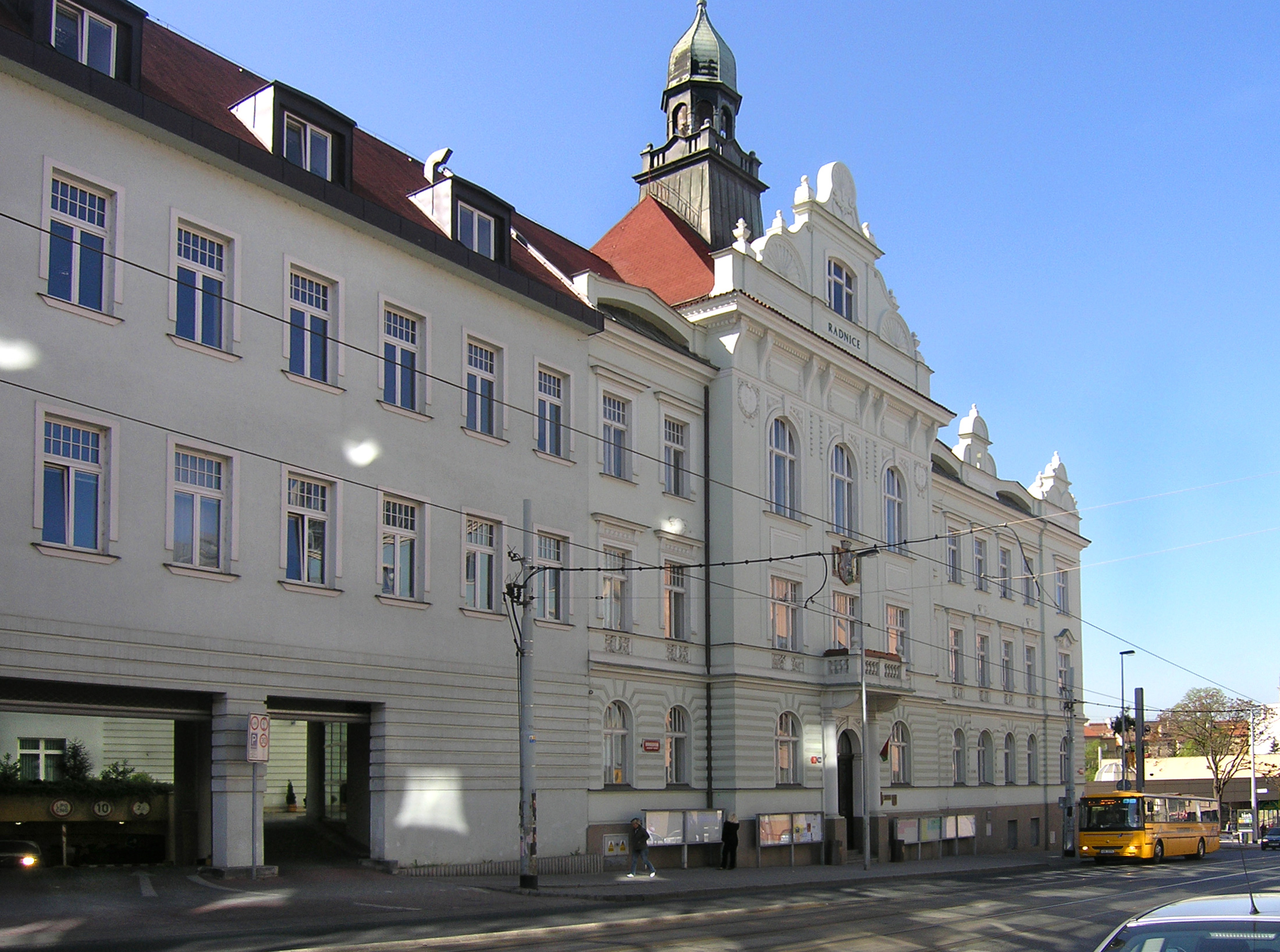
- Prague 9 town hall in Vysočany

- Flag Coat of arms

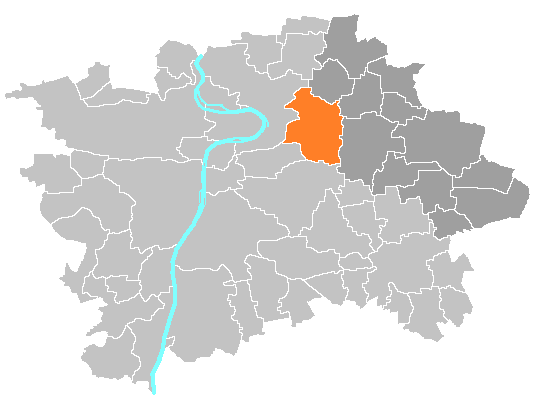
- Location of Prague 9 in Prague
- Country: Czech Republic
- Region: Prague

Government
  - Mayor: Tomáš Portlík (ODS)

Area
  - Total: 13.31 km^{2} (5.14 sq mi)

Population (2021)
  - Total: 62,651
  - Density: 4,707/km^{2} (12,190/sq mi)
- Time zone: UTC+1 (CET)
  - Summer (DST): UTC+2 (CEST)
- Postal code: 190 00
- Website: http://www.praha9.cz

Prague 9 (Czech: Praha 9) is a municipal and administrative district of Prague, Czech Republic. Prague 9 administrative districts takes care mainly of districts of Vysočany, Prosek, Hrdlořezy, and partly of Hloubětín, Libeň, Střížkov a Malešice.

The O2 Arena is located in Prague 9 between Libeň and Vysočany.

== Demographics ==
Historical population
Year	Pop.	±%
1869	2,499	—
1880	3,235	+29.5%
1890	4,511	+39.4%
1900	7,208	+59.8%
1910	11,017	+52.8%
1921	12,634	+14.7%
1930	22,279	+76.3%
1950	32,554	+46.1%
1961	35,574	+9.3%
1970	44,908	+26.2%
1980	55,002	+22.5%
1991	44,867	−18.4%
2001	41,863	−6.7%
2011	55,602	+32.8%
2021	62,651	+12.7%
Source: Censuses

== See also ==
- Districts of Prague § Symbols
