= Letňany (Prague Metro) =

Metro station in the Czech Republic

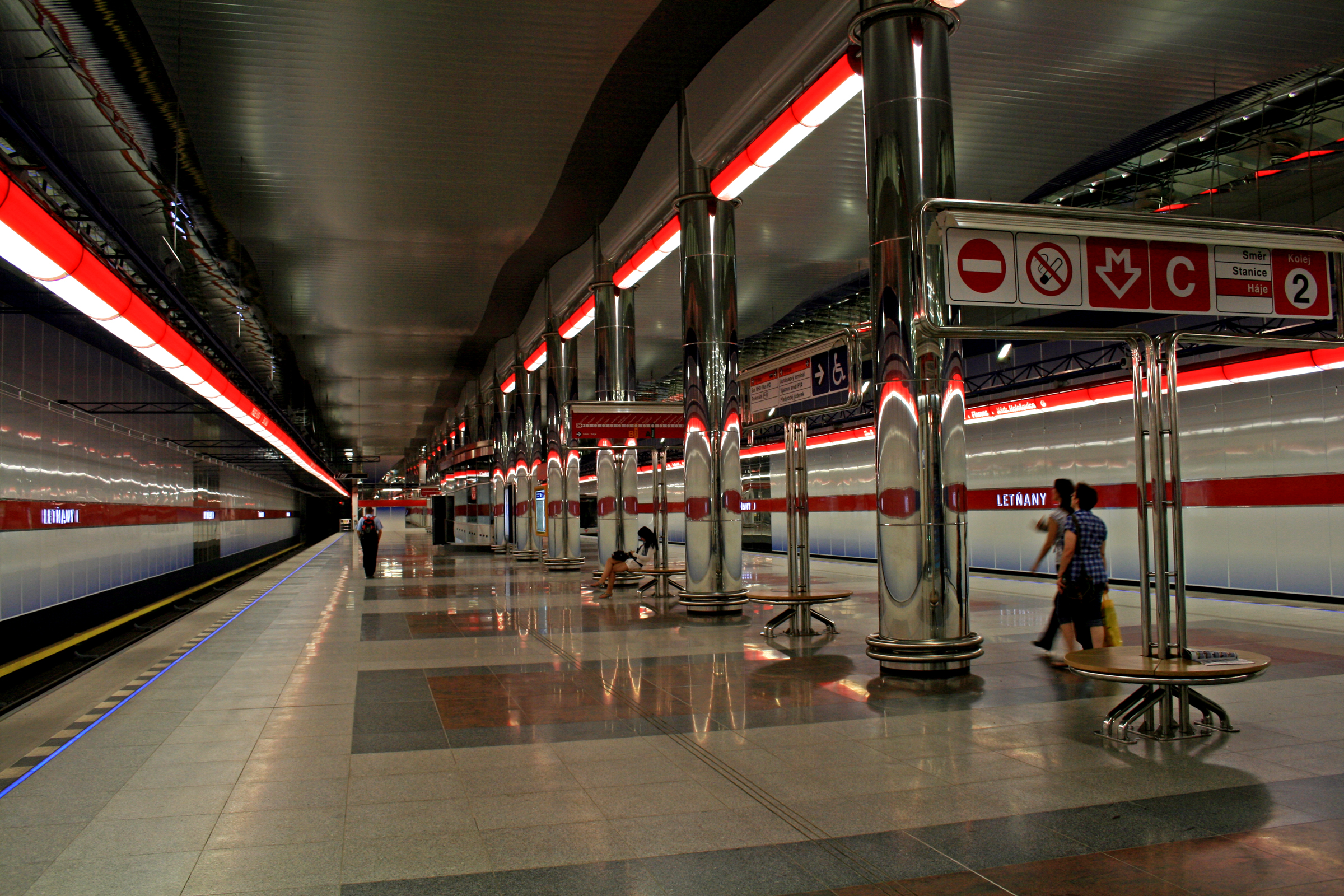
- Platform

General information
- Location: Letňany; Prague 9 Prague; Czechia
- Coordinates: 50.125°N 14.514°E
- System: Prague Metro station
- Owner: Dopravní podnik hl. m. Prahy
- Line: C
- Platforms: Island platform
- Tracks: 2

Construction
- Structure type: Underground
- Depth: 10.3 m (34 ft)
- Platform levels: 1
- Cycle facilities: No
- Accessible: Yes

History
- Opened: 8 May 2008

Services
Preceding station	Prague Metro	Following station
Terminus	Line C	Prosek toward Háje
Location
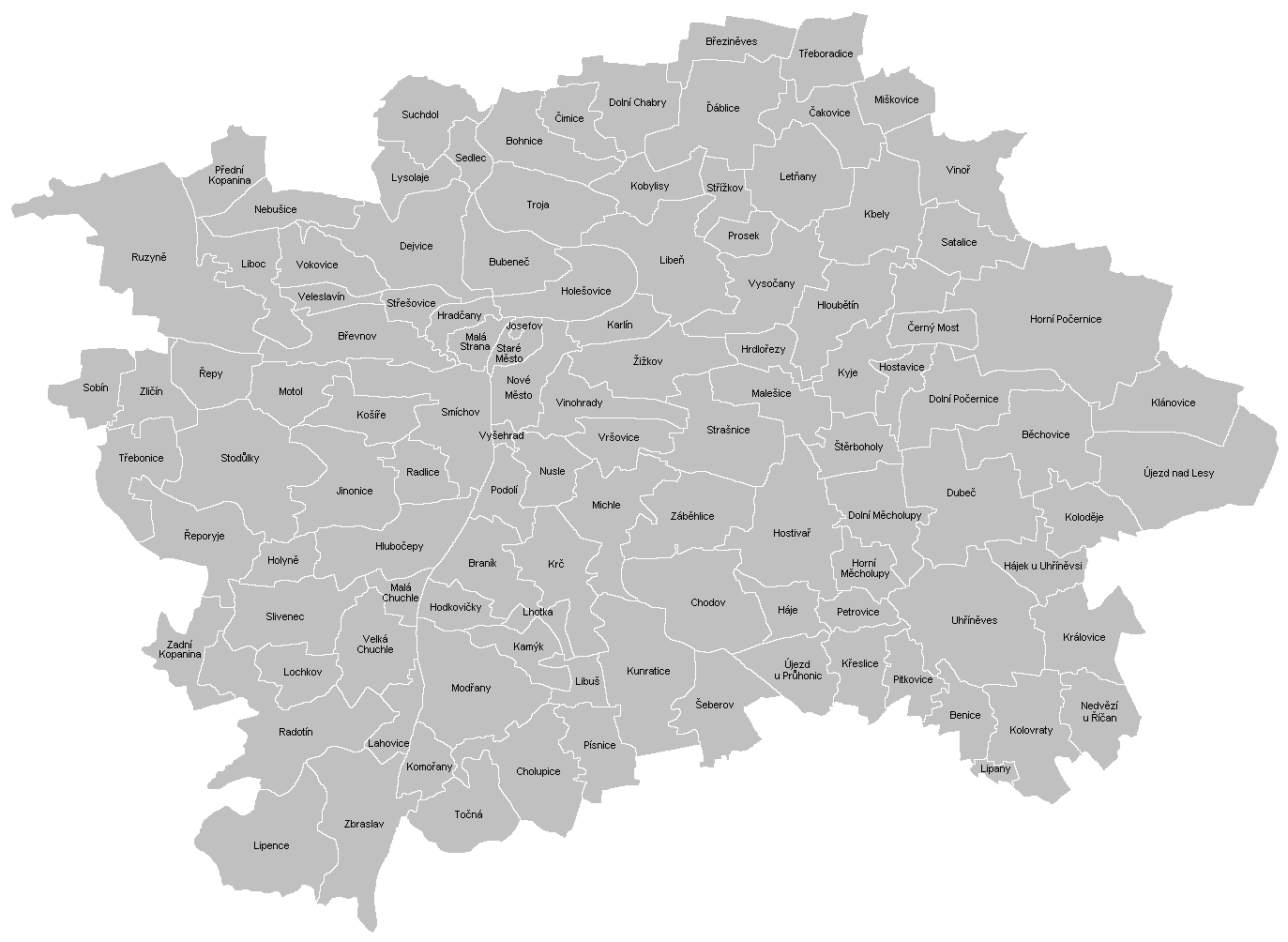
- Location within Prague Location within Greater Prague Location within Czech Republic

Letňany (Czech pronunciation: [ˈlɛtɲanɪ]) is a metro station on Line C of the Prague Metro. It is located about one kilometre south of Letňany built-up area, on the border between Letňany and Vysočany, near a tripoint with Kbely, and it belongs to section IV.C2 of Line C, connecting Letňany with Ládví. The station was opened on 8 May 2008 as the northern end of the extension from Ládví and has served since then as the new terminus of the line.

== Station characteristics ==
Letňany Station is the terminal station of Line C. It is located at the junction of Beranových Street and Prosecká Street, at the south end of Tupolevova Street. The station is below street level, it has an island platform and two entrance halls, each of them connected to the platform by a staircase, two escalators and a lift. The north hall serves the Prague Exhibition Centre (PVA) and P+R parking lots; the south hall connects the station with a number of bus stops. There are eighteen bus lines of Prague Integrated Transport (PID).

The platform is 10.3 metres (34 ft) under ground. Its supporting structure is made from closed monolithic reinforced concrete (one large continuous block).
