= Hostavice =

- Cadastral Area of Prague
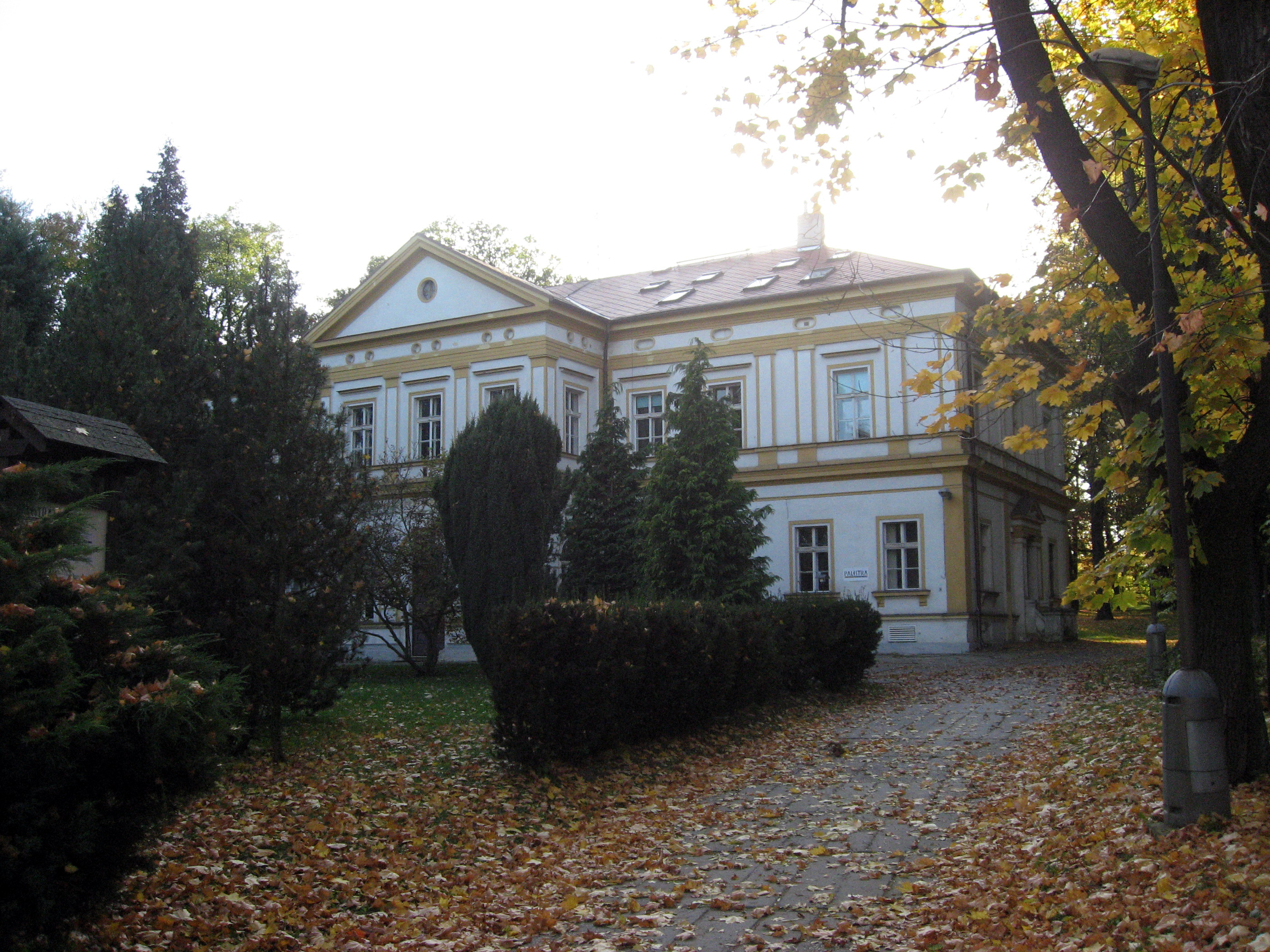
- Hostavice château

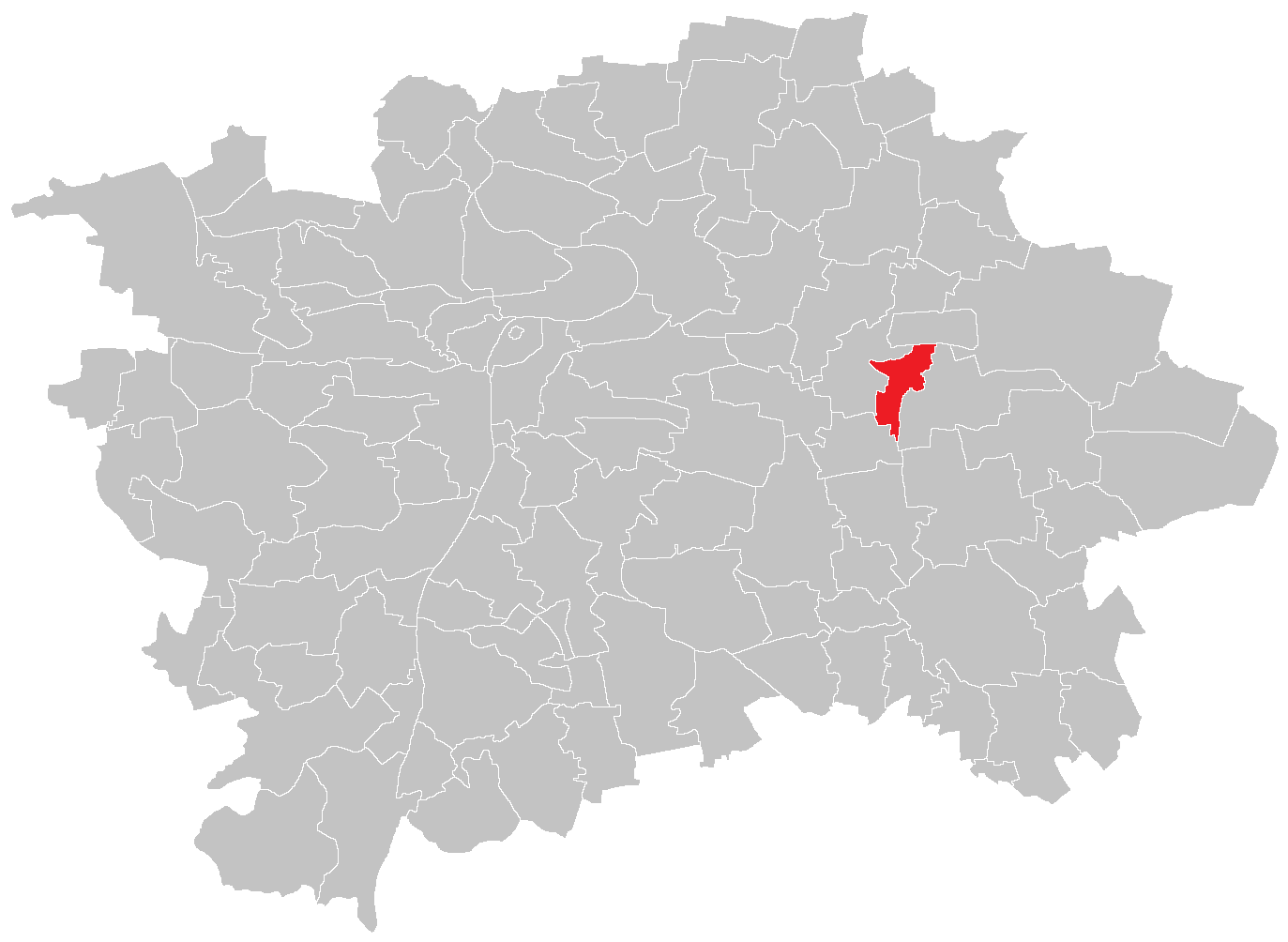
- Location of Hostavice in Prague
- Coordinates: 50°5′34″N 14°33′30″E
- Country: Czech Republic
- Region: Prague
- District: Prague 14

Area
  - Total: 1.98 km^{2} (0.76 sq mi)

Population (2021)
  - Total: 3,800
  - Density: 1,900/km^{2} (5,000/sq mi)
- Time zone: UTC+1 (CET)
  - Summer (DST): UTC+2 (CEST)

Hostavice became part of Prague in 1968. Now it is part of the district of Prague 9 (Prague 14) and is a cadastral area on its own.

The area is 1,98 km^{2} and the population is 3,800 as of the 2021 census.

There is château, nature park (Klánovice-Čihadla) and nature reserve (V Pískovně).

Most of inhabitants of cadastral area of Hostavice live in settlement Jahodnice.

== Demographics ==
Historical population

Year	Pop.	±%
1869	224	—
1880	194	−13.4%
1890	191	−1.5%
1900	186	−2.6%
1910	191	+2.7%
1921	208	+8.9%
1930	1,161	+458.2%
1950	1,241	+6.9%

Year	Pop.	±%
1961	1,408	+13.5%
1970	1,406	−0.1%
1980	1,437	+2.2%
1991	1,215	−15.4%
2001	1,225	+0.8%
2011	2,500	+104.1%
2021	3,800	+52.0%

Source: Censuses

== Neighboring cadastral areas ==
- Černý Most
- Kyje
- Štěrboholy
- Dolní Počernice
