= Dolní Počernice (château) =

Château in Prague

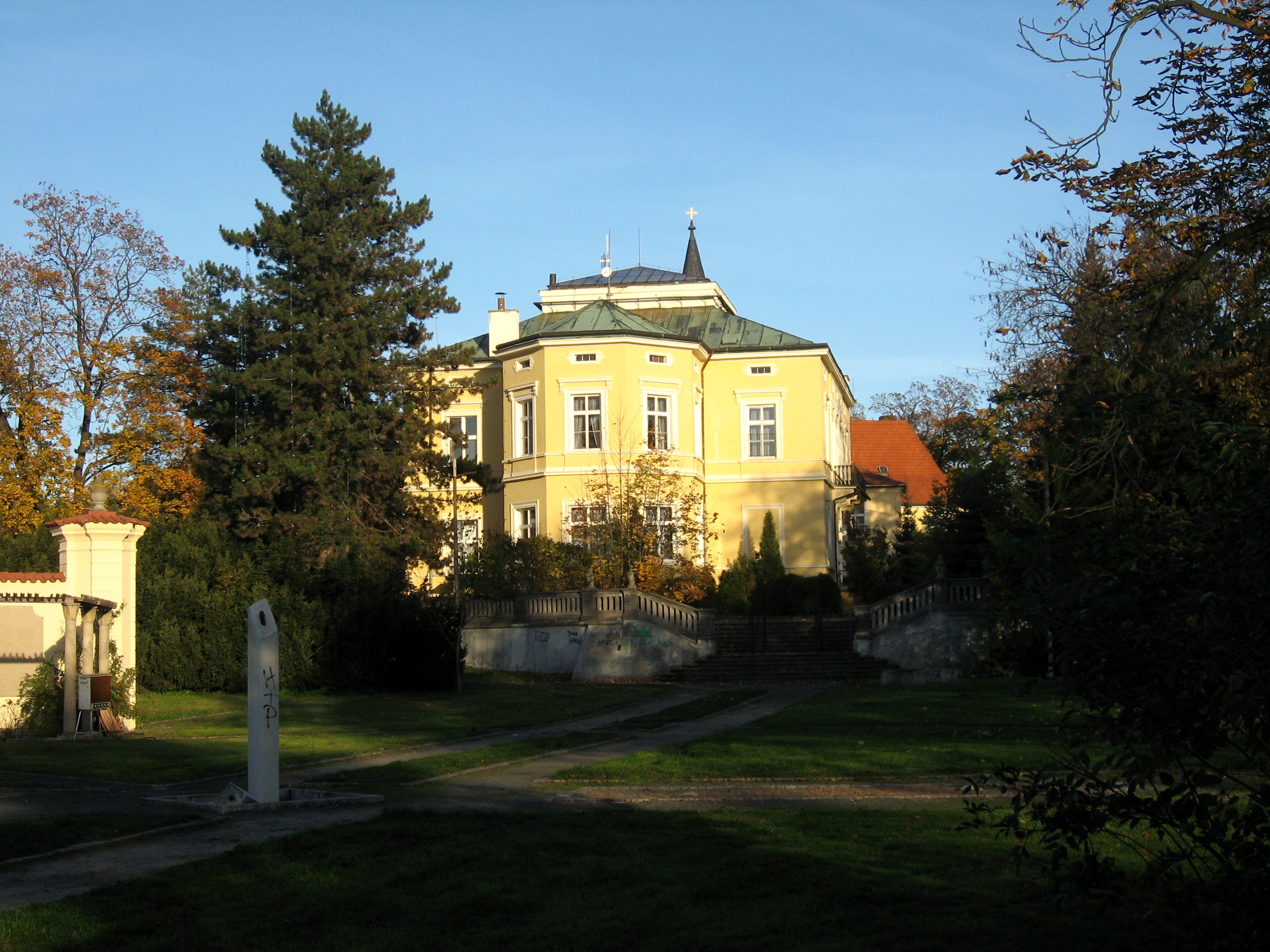
- Dolní Počernice Château

- Location in the Czech Republic

General information
- Type: Château
- Architectural style: Gothic-Renaissance
- Location: Prague, Czech Republic
- Coordinates: 50°5′19.20″N 14°34′46.90″E
- Opened: 1401

Website
- Dolní Počernice Website

Dolní Počernice is an architectural monument located at 1 Národních hrdinů street in Dolní Počernice, near the dike Počernický fishpond and a local English park. It is protected as a cultural monument of Czech Republic. Currently an orphanage is located there. Next to the castle is a small church from the 12th century, which originally was built in Romanesque style.

== History ==
=== From the 15th to the 20th century ===
The castle was built from a medieval fortress, which was first mentioned in 1401. From this year comes the tabular record of the hearing succession of Jan z Cách, owner of the nearby Čelákovice. This record is the first mention of the fortress, but its origin is not known. Until the 1970s, it was presumed that the remains of the fort had not been preserved, but later findings revealed that parts of the castle corresponded to the Gothic tower fortress. On them the southern part of the east wing was built. The possibility of further research is therefore very limited.

By 1527, the fort had already been the property of several owners, having undergone substantial changes. The existing building was expanded to the north into a late Gothic style. It emphasized its character of a residential building. Apparently at that time, the defensive function was taken over by the newly built massive church tower. Later still this Renaissance fortress underwent reconstruction. In 1562, the whole property passed over to the king. The Royal Chamber of Commerce sold it at a reduced prize to Matej Hulka, burgher of Nové Město, named by Ferdinand I to the aristocracy with the attribute z Počernice. The new owner then built the western wing. From this period dates the crest vaults arches on the ground floor, and to this day it is possible to see the evident envelope graffito on the façade.

In 1622, after the Battle of the White Mountain, the castle was confiscated and sold at a reduced price to Jan Kaprovi z Kaprštejn. From 1664 to 1769 it was owned by the Counts of Colloredo-Wallsee from Dolní Počernice. They also gave the castle its present appearance. In 1856 the Hungarian noble family Dercznyi settled here, which owned Počernice until 1923, when it was acquired by the City of Prague.

=== Present day ===
The predominant Baroque style has been wiped off. The chateau has substantially changed and the garden has been transformed into a freely accessible English park. The chateau today includes both the so-called old mansion that originated around 1780 (the two-wing one-storey building is situated close to the church), and the new chateau built in the 19th century, with a junction of the two wings included. The garden remains with the original Baroque architecture: arbor, vases on pedestals, and stairs with a terrace.

== See also ==
- List of castles in Prague
