= Černý Most =

- Cadastral Area of Prague
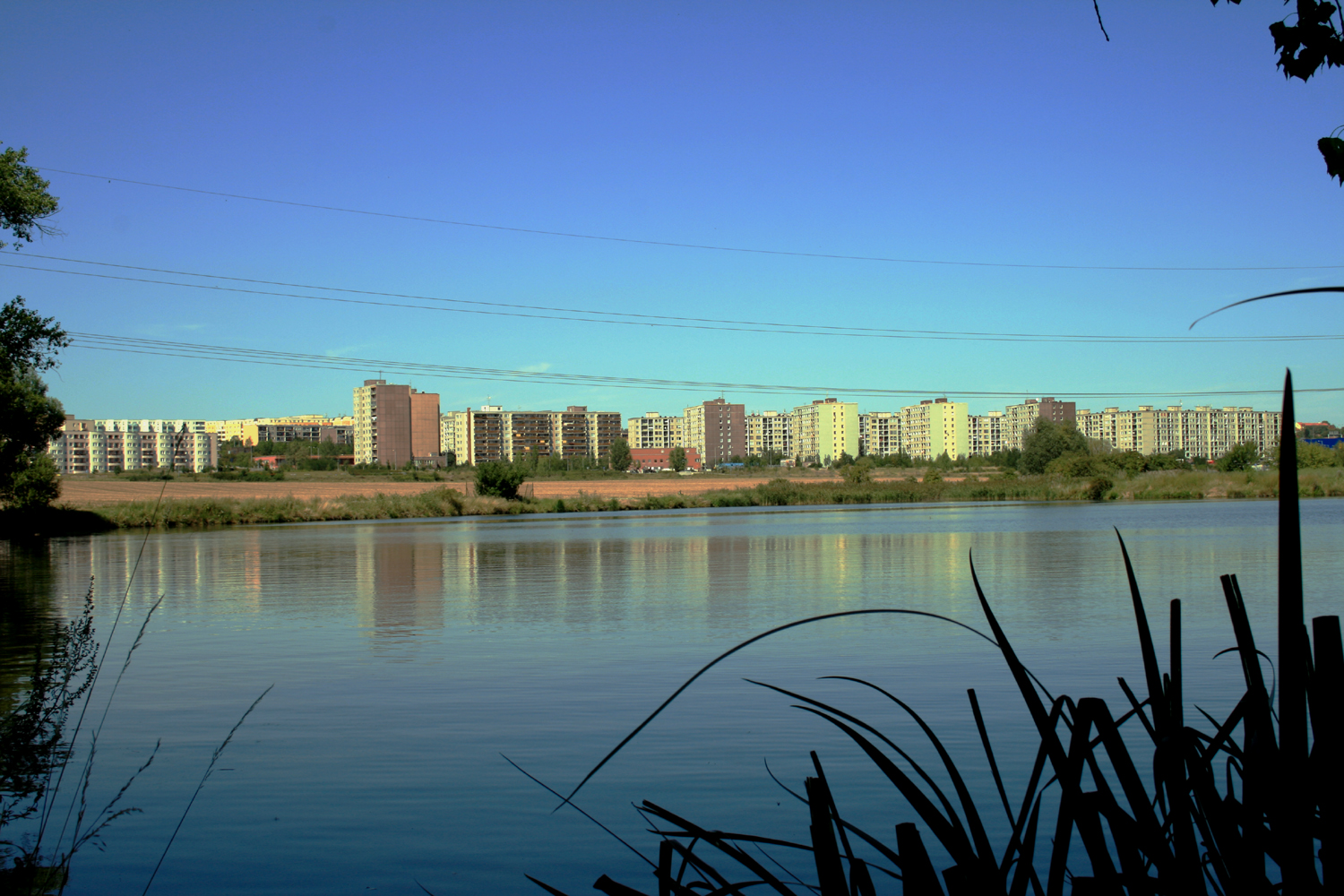
- View of Černý Most from Dolní Počernice

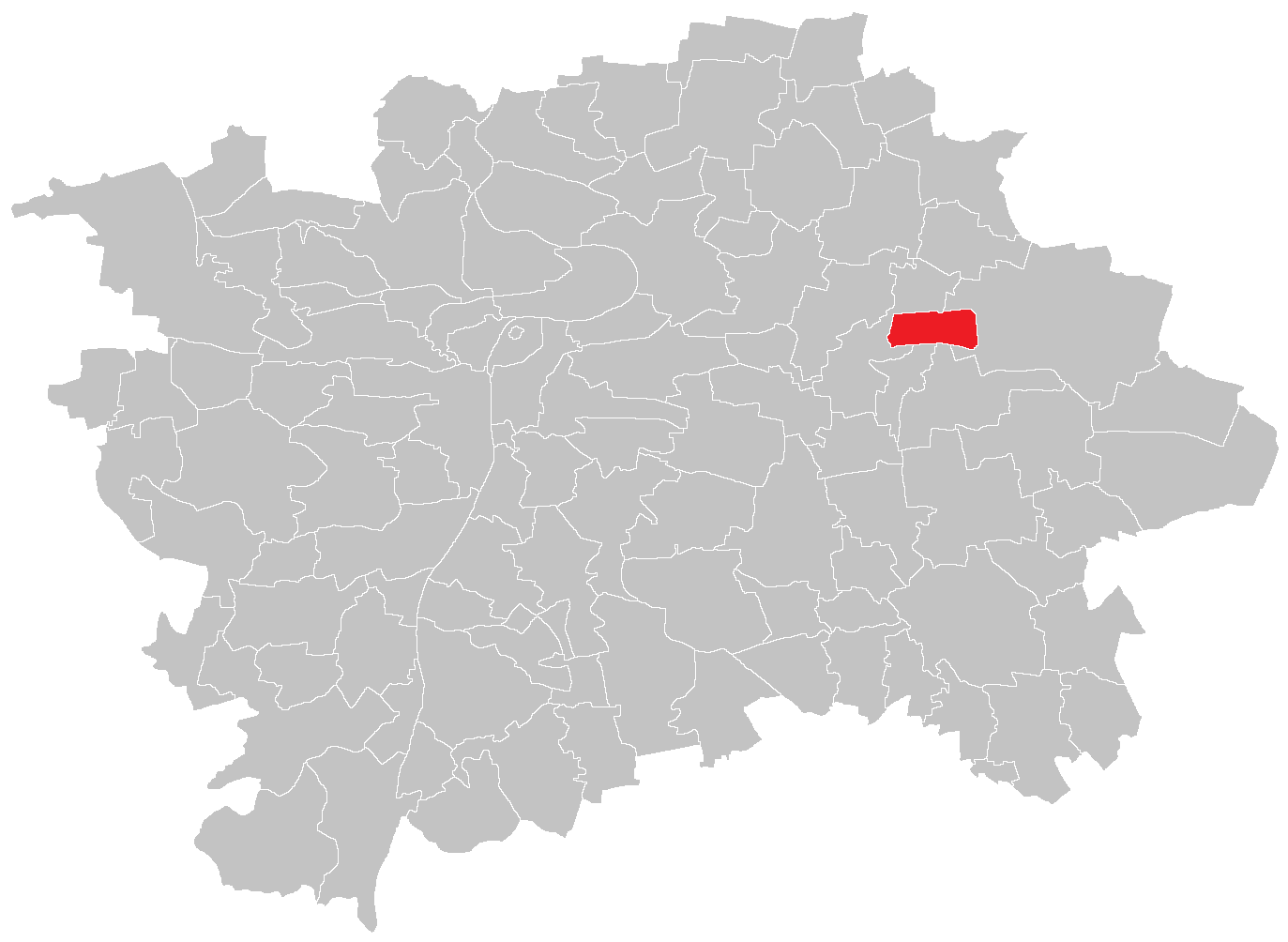
- Location of Černý Most in Prague
- Coordinates: 50°6′18″N 14°33′54″E
- Country: Czech Republic
- Region: Prague
- District: Prague 14

Area
  - Total: 2.10 km^{2} (0.81 sq mi)

Population (2021)
  - Total: 22,466
  - Density: 10,700/km^{2} (27,700/sq mi)
- Time zone: UTC+1 (CET)
  - Summer (DST): UTC+2 (CEST)
- Postal code: 198 00

Černý Most (Czech pronunciation: [ˈtʃɛrniː ˈmost], lit. 'Black Bridge') is a large panel housing estate in the north-east of Prague, belonging to Prague 14. At the end of 2013 it was home to 22,355 residents. As well as residential complexes, the area has a large retail park with the same name.

== History ==
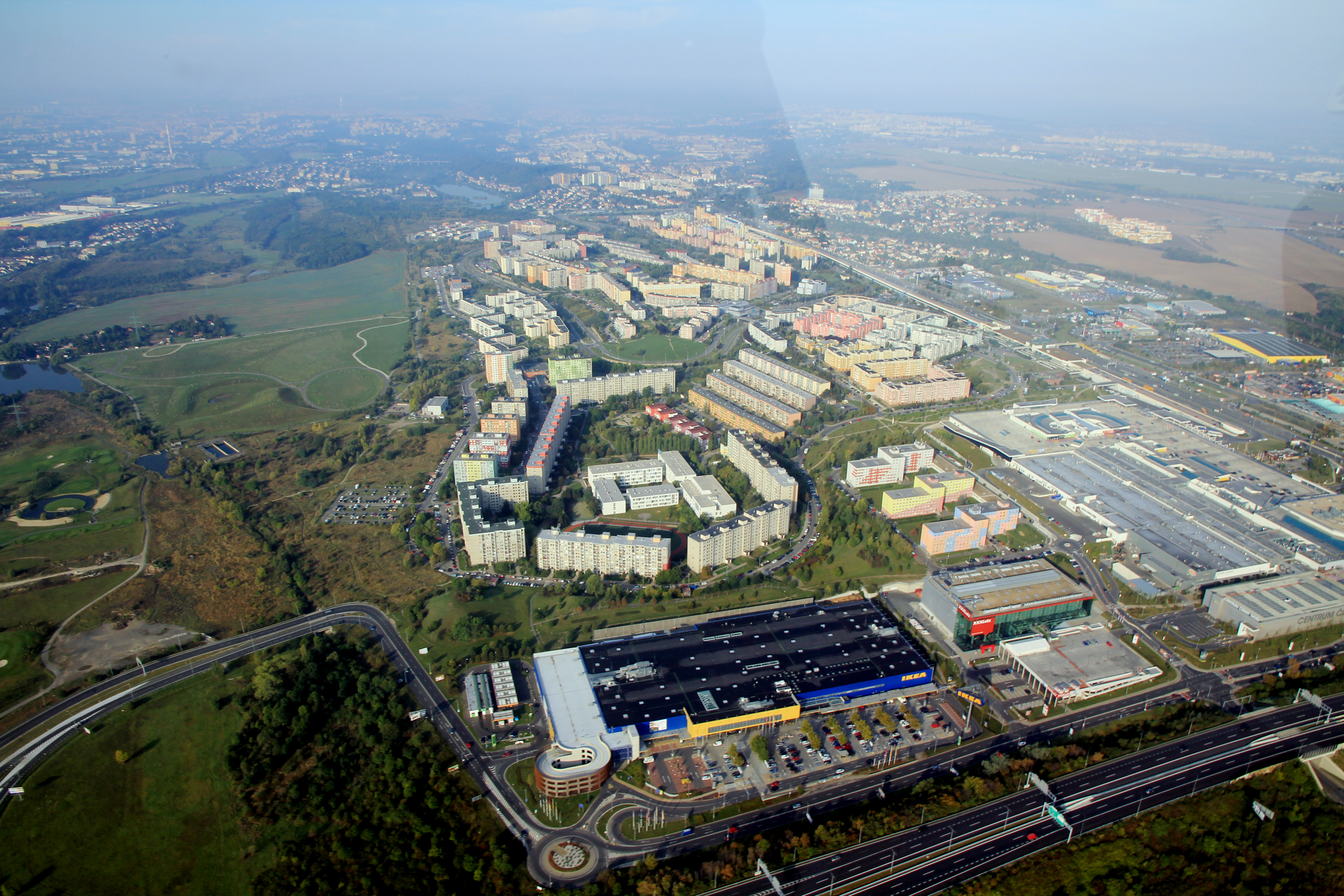
Černý Most seen from a helicopter

The area, whose name means "black bridge" in English, was named after a stone bridge over the nearby railway line from Prague to Čelákovice, which was blackened by smoke from passing steam locomotives. The area was newly formed from parts of the former suburbs of Hloubětín, Kyje and Horní Počernice in 1987. It became a part of Prague on January 1, 1988.

The housing estate was built during the late 1970s and the 1980s in several stages. The first section, sídliště Černý Most I, was completed in 1980 and comprised 1,780 flats. The second section, sídliště Černý Most II, was started in 1985 under the Czechoslovak Socialist Republic, but not completed until 1992 after the Velvet Revolution had ended Communist rule.

The streets were originally to be named after Communist officials, mostly from the Soviet Union. Instead they were named after Czechoslovak airmen who fought in the French Air Force and Royal Air Force Volunteer Reserve in World War II. They include:

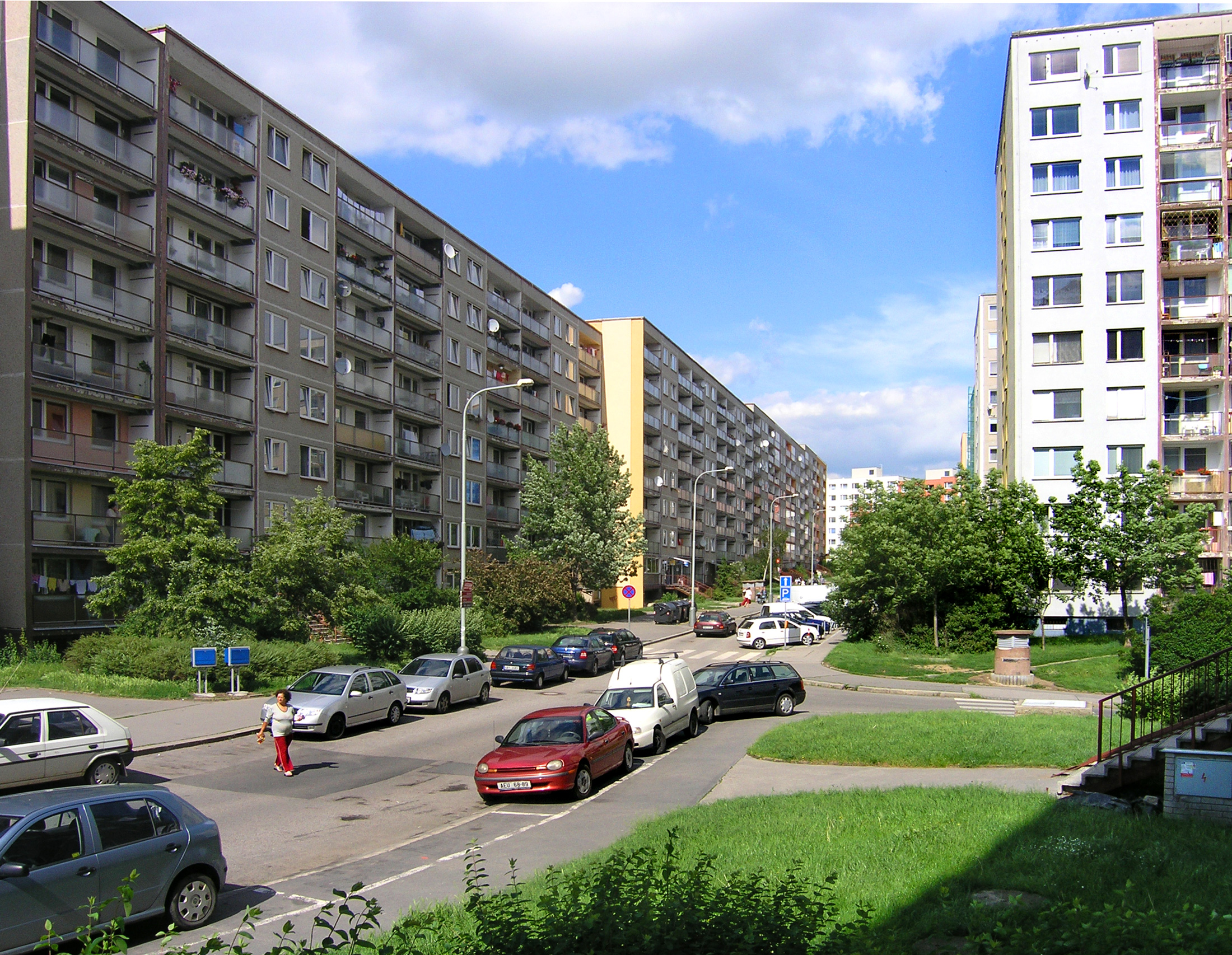
Vašátková, the street named after RAF fighter ace Alois Vašátko

- "Generála Janouška" – after Air Marshal Karel Janoušek,
- "Bryksova" – after Flight Lieutenant Josef Bryks,
- "Dygrýnova" – after Flight Sergeant Josef Dygrýn,
- "Františkova" – after Flight Sergeant Josef František,
- "Himrova" – after Staff Captain Jaroslav Himr,
- "Kuttelwascherova" – after Squadron Leader Karel Kuttelwascher,
- "Mansfeldova" – after Squadron Leader Miloslav Mansfeld,
- "Smikova" – after Squadron Leader Otto Smik,
- "Arnošta Valenty" – after Flying Officer Arnošt Valenta,
- "Vašátková" – after Wing Commander Alois Vašátko.

== Demographics ==
Historical population
Year	Pop.	±%
1980	97	—
1991	6,909	+7022.7%
2001	18,868	+173.1%
2011	24,427	+29.5%
2021	22,466	−8.0%
Source: Censuses

== Today ==
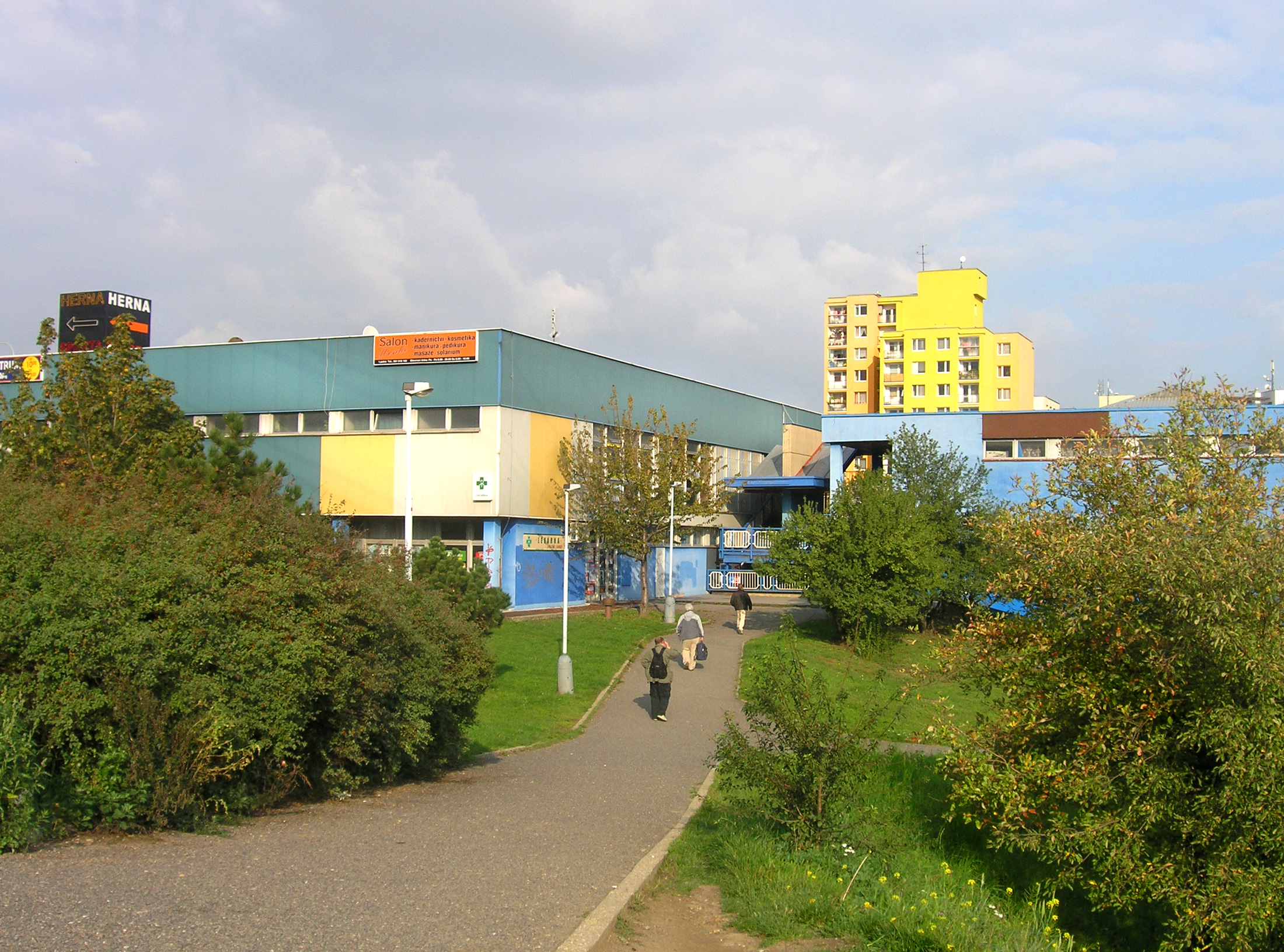
The Sparta shopping centre on Cíglerova street

The estate is served by the last two Prague Metro stations on Line B, Rajská zahrada and Černý Most, the latter of which is adjacent to a large intercity bus station. There are two smaller Park and ride facilities near both metro stations. The area is also home to a shopping centre, Centrum Černý Most.

== In popular culture ==
Parts of the film Babí léto (2001) were filmed in Černý Most.
