= Rajská zahrada (Prague Metro) =

Prague metro station

Coordinates: 50°06′24″N 14°33′38″E

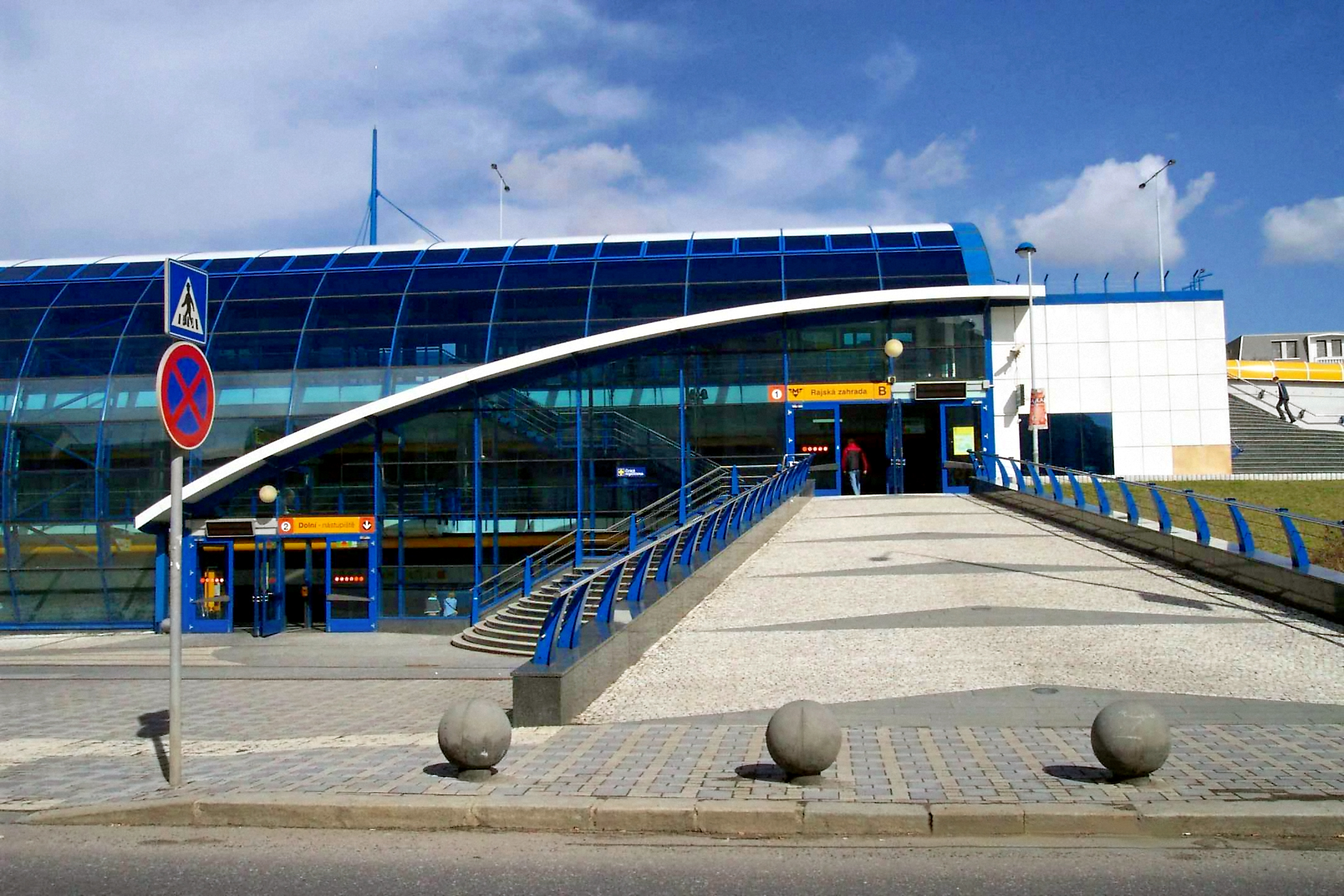

General information
- Location: Chlumecká street Černý Most, Prague 14; Prague; Czech Republic
- System: Prague Metro
- Platforms: Split, 2 levels
- Tracks: 2

Construction
- Structure type: Surface level
- Depth: 82 m (269 ft)
- Accessible: Yes

Other information
- Fare zone: PID: Prague

History
- Opened: 8 November 1998; 27 years ago

Services
| Preceding station | Prague Metro | Following station |
|---|---|---|
| Hloubětín toward Zličín | Line B | Černý Most Terminus |
Location

Rajská zahrada (Czech pronunciation: [ˈrajskaː ˈzaɦrada], lit. 'Paradise Garden' or 'Garden of Eden') is a Prague Metro station on Line B. It was opened on 8 November 1998 as part of the extension of Line B from Českomoravská to Černý Most. The station was designed by Patrik Kotas.

It has an unorthodox platform design, where trains in each direction are on a different level with the westbound platform being directly above the eastbound track. Due to its unique architectural design, Rajská zahrada was named the Czech Construction of the Year for 1999.

In 2023, a railway station was opened near the station, just across the Chlumecká street.

== Gallery ==
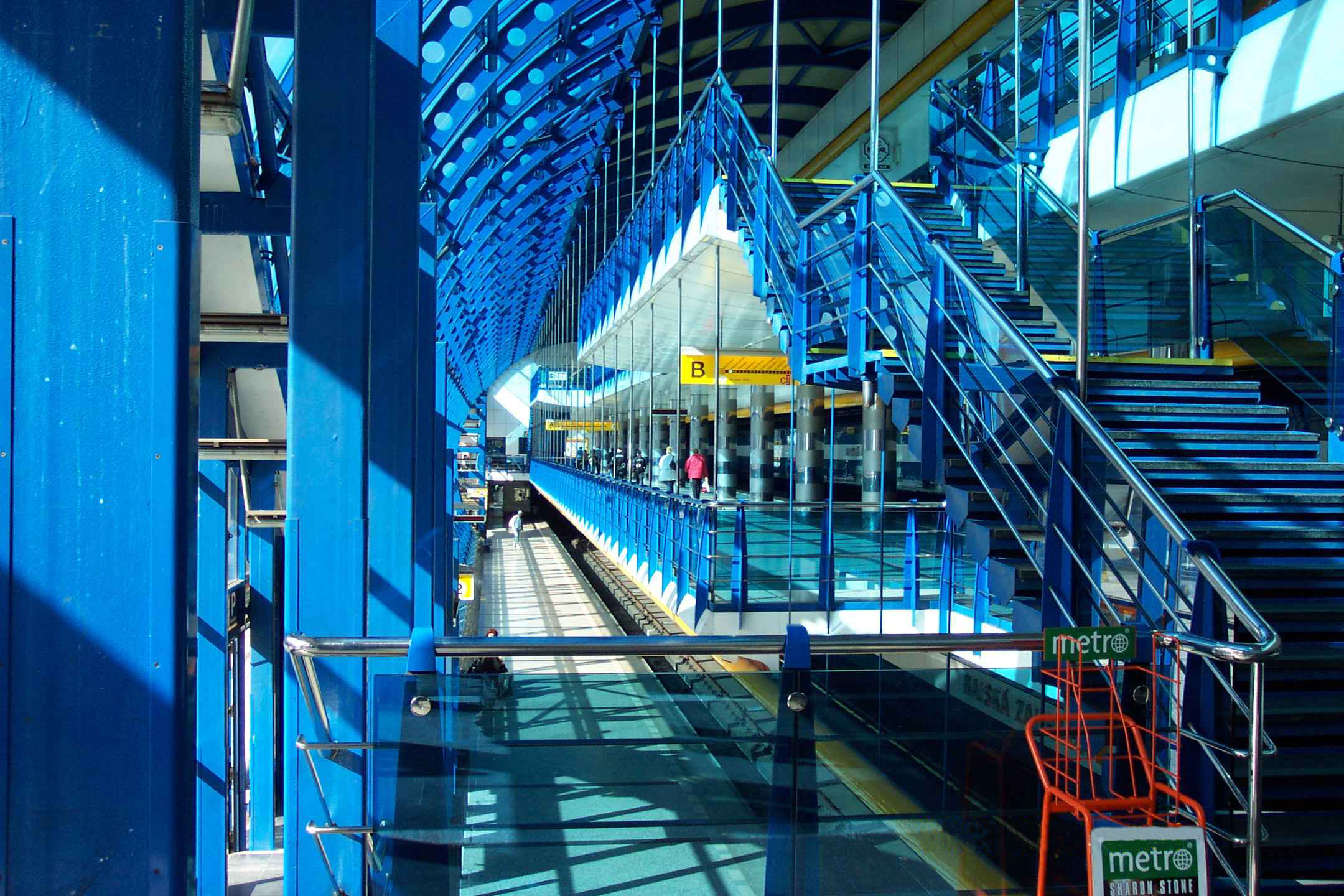
The inside of Rajská zahrada station

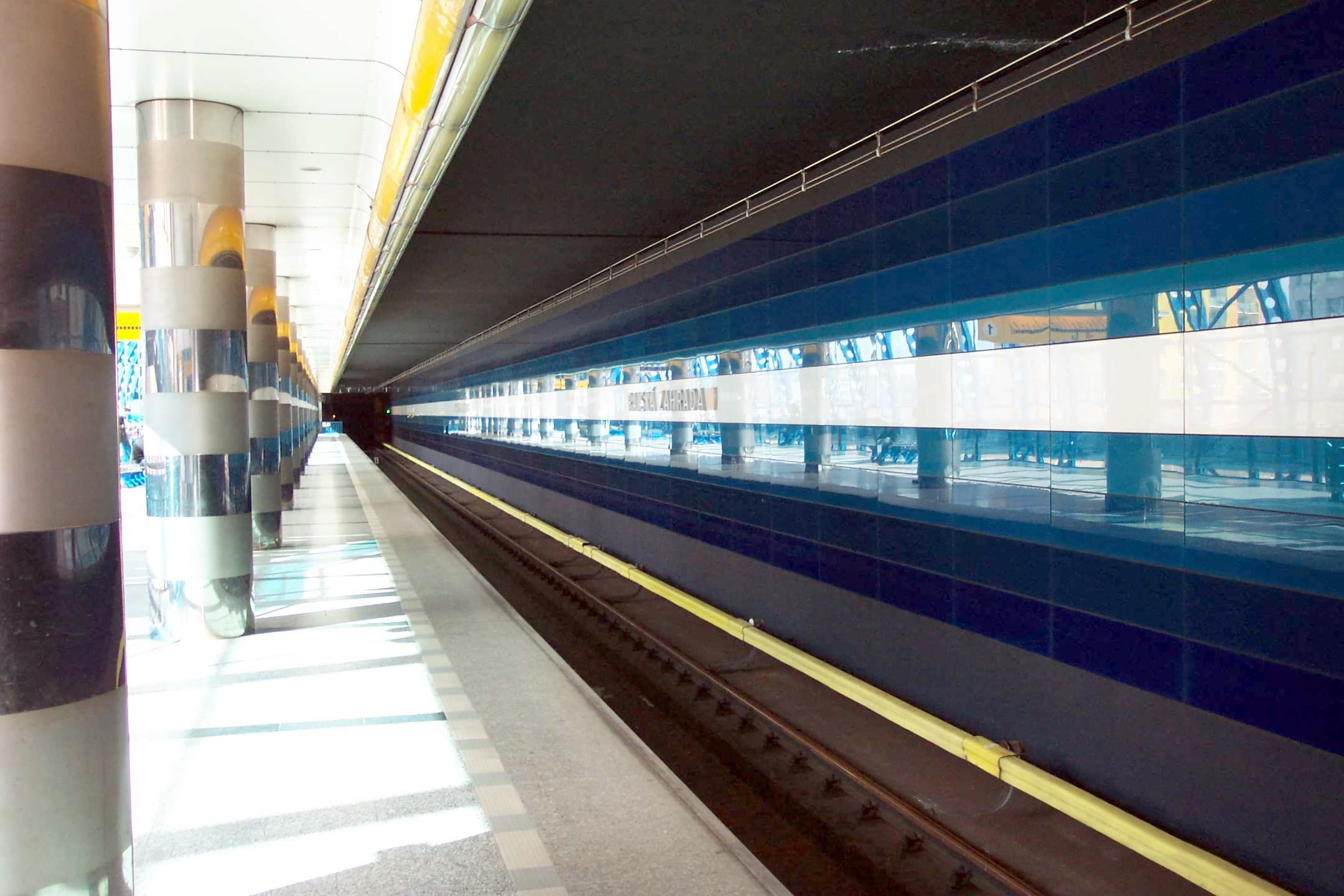
Platform
