= List of castles in Prague =

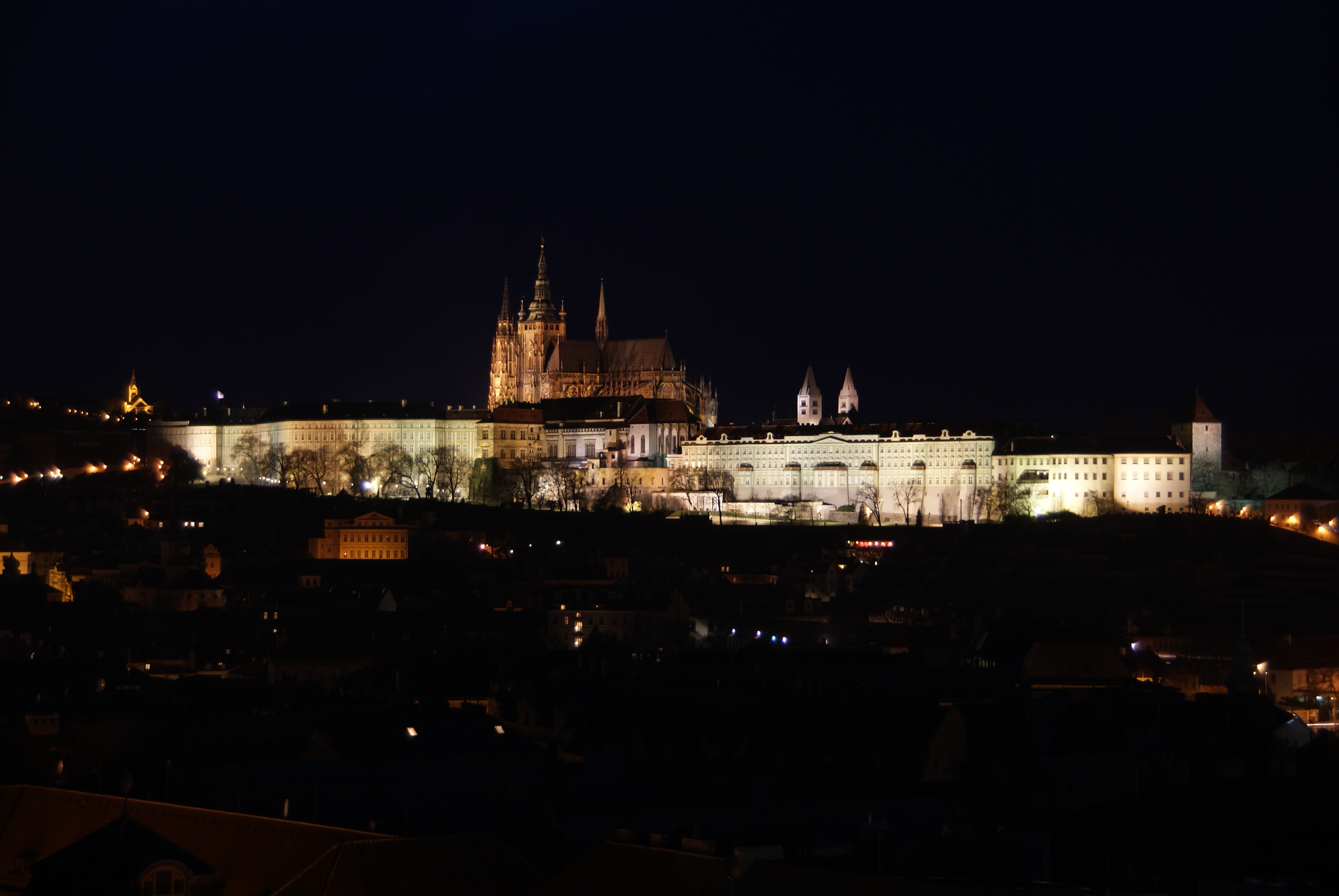
The Prague Castle at night.

This is the List of castles and châteaux located in Prague, the capital city of the Czech Republic. There are many palaces and châteaux in the area, therefore this list is not complete. After the name of the castle or château comes the area where it is located, the architectural style in which it was built or remodeled, and a short description of the subject.

== Table of contents ==
Name	Image	District	Architecture	Summary	Refs
Biskupský dvůr Castle		***	***	***	***
Chodov Fort		Prague 11	Gothic	(Pictured)The Chodov water fort dates back to 1185, when it was owned by the Vyšehrad Chapter. In the 19th century neo-classical arcades were added, and the north tower was demolished.	
Chvaly Chateau		***	***	Chvaly Chateau.	***
Ctěnice Chateau		***	***	Carriage museum at Ctěnice Chateau.	***
Čakovice Chateau		***	***	Čakovice Chateau.	***
Ďáblice Chateau	***	***	***	***	***
Děvín Castle		***	***	Hill of Děvín (310 m) above Zlíchov where Děvín Castle used to stand in Middle Ages.	***
Dolní Počernice Chateau		Prague 14	Neo-Baroque	Protected as an architectural cultural monument of Czech Republic, the château currently houses an orphanage.	
Hloubětín Chateau		***	***	***	***
Hlubočepy Chateau		***	***	***	***
Jenerálka Chateau		Prague 6	Neo-Baroque	A farmyard in the 1850s, in the second half of the 18th century it allegedly housed part of the Austrian General Staff - hence the name Jenerálka.	
Jinonice Chateau		***	***	Entrance of Jinonice Chateau.	***
Koloděje Chateau		***	***	Koloděje Chateau, sometimes used for government sessions.	***
Komořany Chateau		***	***	Komořany Chateau houses Czech Hydrometeorological Institute.	***
Krč Chateau		***	***	Krč Chateau.	***
Kuglvajt Castle		***	***	***	***
Kunratice Chateau		***	***	***	***
Letohrádek Hvězda Chateau		***	***	Hvězda Summerhouse has a unique shape of a six-pointed star.	***
Letohrádek Kinských Chateau		***	***	Kinsky Summerhouse on southern side of the Petřín Hill.	***
Letohrádek Královny Anny		***	***	Queen Anne's Summerhouse in Royal Garden of Prague Castle.	***
Libeň Chateau		Prague 8	***	Libeň Chateau where Treaty of Libeň between Emperor Rudolf II and his brother Archduke Matthias was signed in 1608.	***
Lochkov Chateau		***	***	***	***
Malešice Chateau		***	***	***	***
Michnův letohrádek Chateau		***	***	***	***
Místodržitelský letohrádek Chateau		***	***	Viceroy's Summerhouse in Stromovka Park.	***
Motol Chateau		***	***	Motol Chateau.	***
Nový Hrad u Kunratic Castle		***	***	Ruins of Nový Hrad (New Castle) in Forest of Kunratice. This was a favourite residence of King Wenceslas IV but the castle was destroyed by Hussites shortly after his death.	***
Petrovice Chateau		***	**	Petrovice Chateau.	***
Portheimka Chateau		***	***	Portheimka Chateau in Smíchov.	***
Práče Chateau		***	***	***	***
Prague Castle		***	***	Prague Castle by night.	***
Suchdol Chateau		***	***	***	***
Troja Chateau		***	***	Troja Chateau.	***
Uhříněves Chateau		***	***	***	***
Veleslavín Chateau		***	***	Veleslavín Chateau.	***
Villa Amerika		***	***	Michna's Summerhouse in the New Town, nowadays it houses a museum of composer Antonín Dvořák.	***
Vinoř Chateau		***	***	Vinoř Chateau.	***
Vyšehrad Castle		Prague 2	Baroque	(Pictured) Vyšehrad as seen over the Vltava River from Císařská louka (Imperial Meadow) Island. The Basilica of St Peter and St Paul, which dominates Vyšehrad, was remodelled in the second half of the 14th century and again in 1885 and 1887 in Neo-gothic style	
Záběhlice Chateau		***	***	***	***
Zbraslav Chateau		***	***	Zbraslav Chateau	***

== See also ==
- List of castles in the Czech Republic
- List of castles in Europe
- List of castles
