= Alois Vašátko =

Czechoslovak artillery officer (1908–1942)

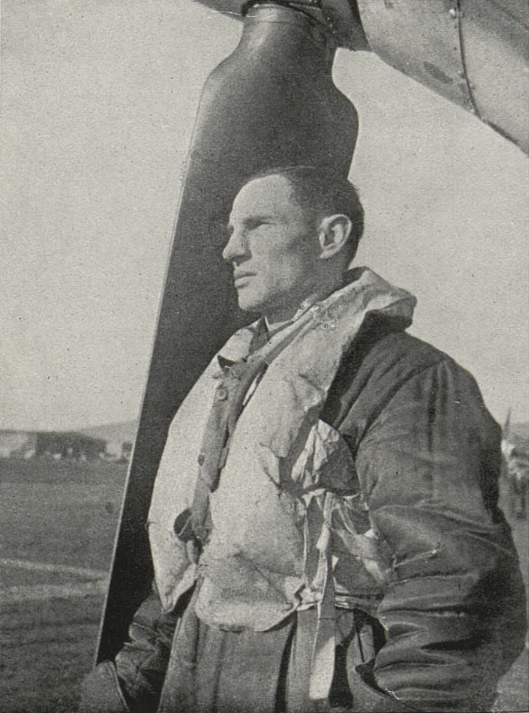
- Vašátko c. 1940
- Born: 25 August 1908; Čelákovice, Austria-Hungary
- Died: 23 June 1942 (aged 33); English Channel, off Start Point, England
- Military career
- Allegiance: Czechoslovakia; France; United Kingdom
- Branch: Czechoslovak Army; Czechoslovak Air Force; French Foreign Legion; Armée de l'Air; Royal Air Force
- Service years: 1928–42
- Rank: Wing Commander
- Nicknames: Lojzek; Amos; The Great Amos
- Service number: 83233
- Units: 22nd Infantry Regiment 3rd Artillery Regiment; 54th Artillery Regiment; 7th Artillery Regiment; Artillery School Olomouc; 14th Observation Squadron; Groupe de Chasse I/5 No. 312 Squadron RAF
- Commands: 14th Observation Squadron "B" Flight, 312 Squadron; 312 Squadron Czechoslovak Fighter Wing
- Conflicts: Second World War; Battle of France; Battle of Britain
- Awards: Military Order of the White Lion (posthumous); Milan Rastislav Stefanik Order (posthumous); Czechoslovak War Cross 1939–1945 × 3; Československá medaile Za chrabrost před nepřítelem × 2; Československá medaile za zásluhy, 1st class; Pamětní medaile československé armády v zahraničí; Chevalier de la Légion d'honneur; Croix de guerre 1939–1945 with 7 palms, 2 gold star & 1 silver star; Distinguished Flying Cross; 1939–1945 Star with Battle of Britain clasp; Air Crew Europe Star

Alois Vašátko DFC (25 August 1908 – 23 June 1942) was a Czechoslovak artillery officer who became an air force pilot. In the Second World War he was a fighter ace, first in the French Air Force in the Battle of France and then in the Royal Air Force.

In the French Air Force Vašátko shot down at least 12 enemy aircraft in May and June 1940. In the RAF he shot down another 14 enemy aircraft between October 1940 and his death in June 1942. He commanded No. 312 (Czechoslovak) Squadron RAF from June 1941 and RAF Fighter Command's Czechoslovak fighter wing from May 1942.

France awarded Vašátko the Croix de guerre 1939–1945 with seven palms, two gold stars and one silver star, and made him a Chevalier de la Légion d'honneur. The United Kingdom awarded him the Distinguished Flying Cross.

Vašátko was killed in action in June 1942 by a mid-air collision over the English Channel between his Supermarine Spitfire and an enemy Focke-Wulf Fw 190.

== Early life ==
Vašátko was born in 1908 in Čelákovice in central Bohemia. He was one of five children of a cabinet-maker, also called Alois Vašátko, who served in the Austro-Hungarian armed forces and returned from the First World War as an invalid.

When Vašátko was still a child the family moved to Týniště nad Orlicí in northeastern Bohemia, where Vašátko completed secondary school. He then studied at a teacher training college in Hradec Králové and became a schoolteacher in Litoměřice in northern Bohemia.

== Czechoslovak armed forces ==
On 1 October 1928 Vašátko changed career, joining the Czechoslovak Army as an artilleryman. In 1929 he began training at the military academy in Hranice. In July 1931 he passed out as a Poruchik (junior lieutenant) and was posted to Olomouc in Moravia as commander of the 2nd battery of the 7th Artillery Regiment. On 1 October 1935 he was promoted to senior lieutenant.

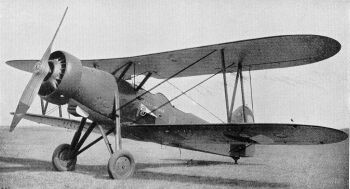
Letov Š-328 aerial reconnaissance biplane

Also in 1935 Vašátko trained as an air observer at the military aviation school at Prostějov in Moravia. On 31 December 1936 he transferred from the Army to the Czechoslovak Air Force. On 15 November 1937 he was appointed commander of the 14th Observation Squadron of the 2nd "Dr Edvard Beneš" Air Regiment stationed at Olomouc, which was equipped with Letov Š-328 reconnaissance aircraft.

On 30 September 1938 France and the United Kingdom allowed Germany to annexe the Sudetenland. Vašátko continued his training and on 1 March 1939 he qualified as a pilot. On 15 March Germany occupied the remainder of Bohemia and Moravia and imposed a Protectorate of Bohemia and Moravia with a puppet government that it ordered to dissolve its armed forces. The Czechoslovak Air Force ceased to exist, and the Luftwaffe confiscated its aircraft.

Leaving the protectorate was not allowed, but many airmen chose to do so illegally. In July 1939 Vašátko passed through the now independent Slovak Republic and over the Beskid mountain range into Poland, where he reported to the Czechoslovak Consulate in Kraków. On 28 July he and other Czechoslovaks left Gdynia aboard the Polish ocean liner Chrobry.

== French Air Force ==
Vašátko disembarked in France, where Czechoslovak refugees were not yet allowed to join the Armée de l'air. After France declared war on Germany on 3 September 1939 Czechoslovaks were allowed to join the French Foreign Legion. Only after 17 November were they allowed to the Armée de l'air.

Vašátko enlisted and was trained at the Centre d'Instruction de la Chasse ("Fighter Training Centre") at Chartres air base. On 1 May 1940 he was promoted to captain. On 10 May Germany invaded the Netherlands and Belgium and attacked France.

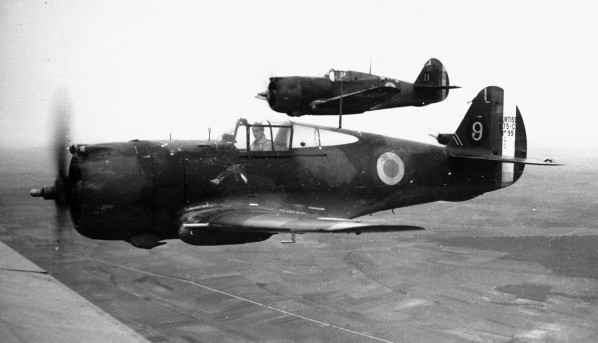
Armée de l'air Curtiss H-75 fighters flying in close formation in June 1940

The next day Vašátko and fellow-Czechoslovaks Adolf Vrána and Tomáš Vybíral were posted to the Groupe de Chasse I/5 "La Fayette", which was equipped with new Curtiss H-75-C1 fighter aircraft.

Vašátko quickly became a fighter ace. By the end of the six-week campaign he was credited with shooting down 12 German aircraft and probably two more. France awarded him the Croix de guerre, to which it added seven palms, two gold stars and one silver star. He was made a Chevalier of the Légion d'honneur.

After France capitulated to Germany on 22 June 1940, GC I/5 withdrew to French Algeria. Vašátko left and travelled via Morocco to Gibraltar, whence he went by ship to Cardiff in Wales.

== Royal Air Force ==
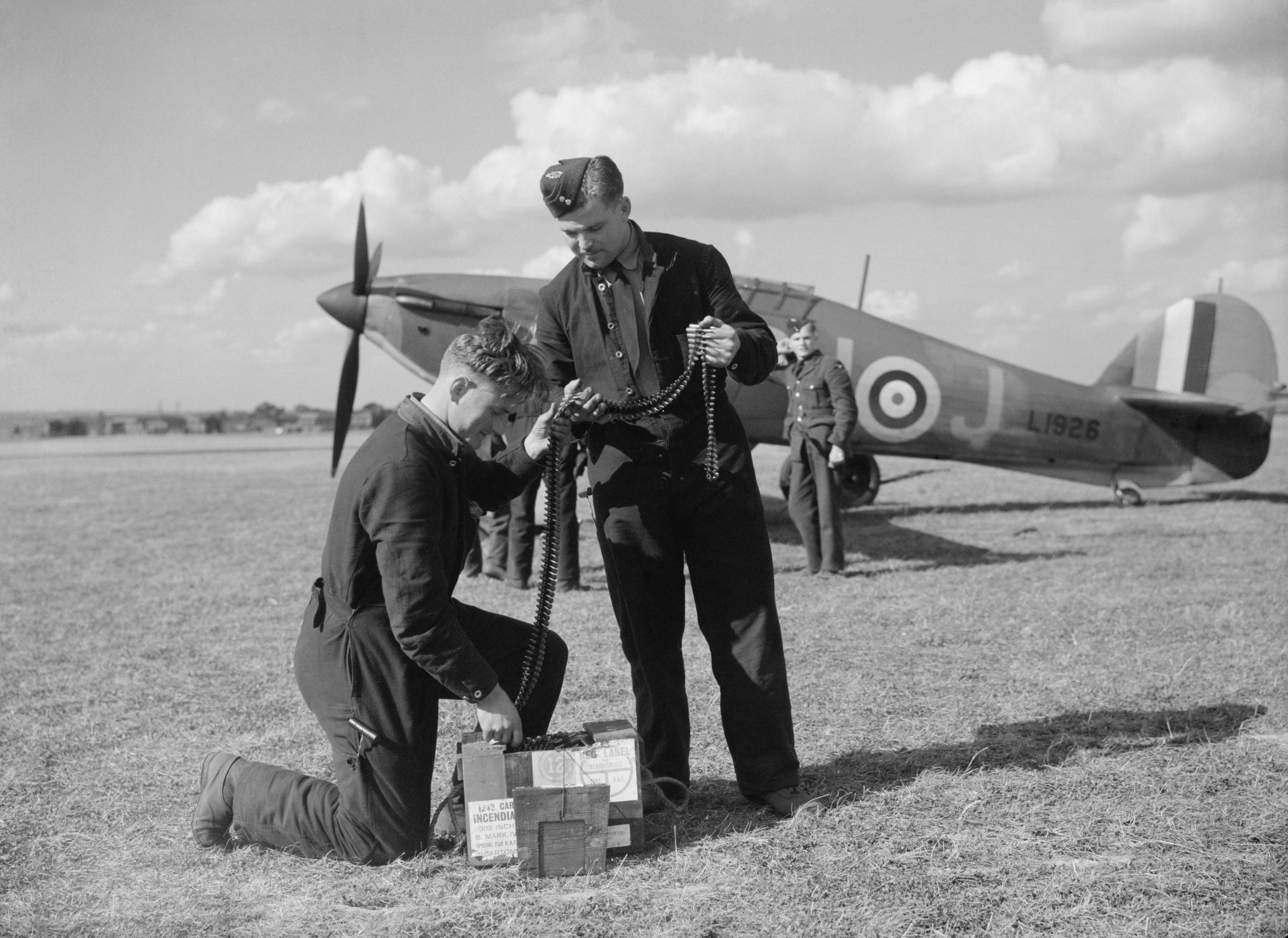
Armourers of 312 Squadron prepare ammunition belts, with Vašátko's Hurricane Mk I fighter, DU-J, in the background

The United Kingdom quickly agreed to enlist Czechoslovak airmen in the Royal Air Force Volunteer Reserve. Vašátko was commissioned as a Pilot Officer and retrained to fly Hurricane Mk I aircraft. He was posted to the newly formed No. 312 (Czechoslovak) Squadron RAF, where he was allocated to Yellow Flight with Sergeant Josef Stehlík and led by Flight Lieutenant Denys Gillam.

By October 1940 the squadron was stationed at RAF Speke outside Liverpool. About 16:00 hrs on 8 October a lone Luftwaffe Junkers Ju 88 medium bomber of Kampfgeschwader 2/806 was sighted flying up the River Mersey. Yellow Flight was scrambled, with Vašátko flying Hurricane L1926, code letters DU-J. All three fighters machine-gunned the Ju 88, killing its observer and setting fire to its two engines. At 16:15 the bomber made a forced landing in a field near Bromborough Dock and the surviving crew were captured.

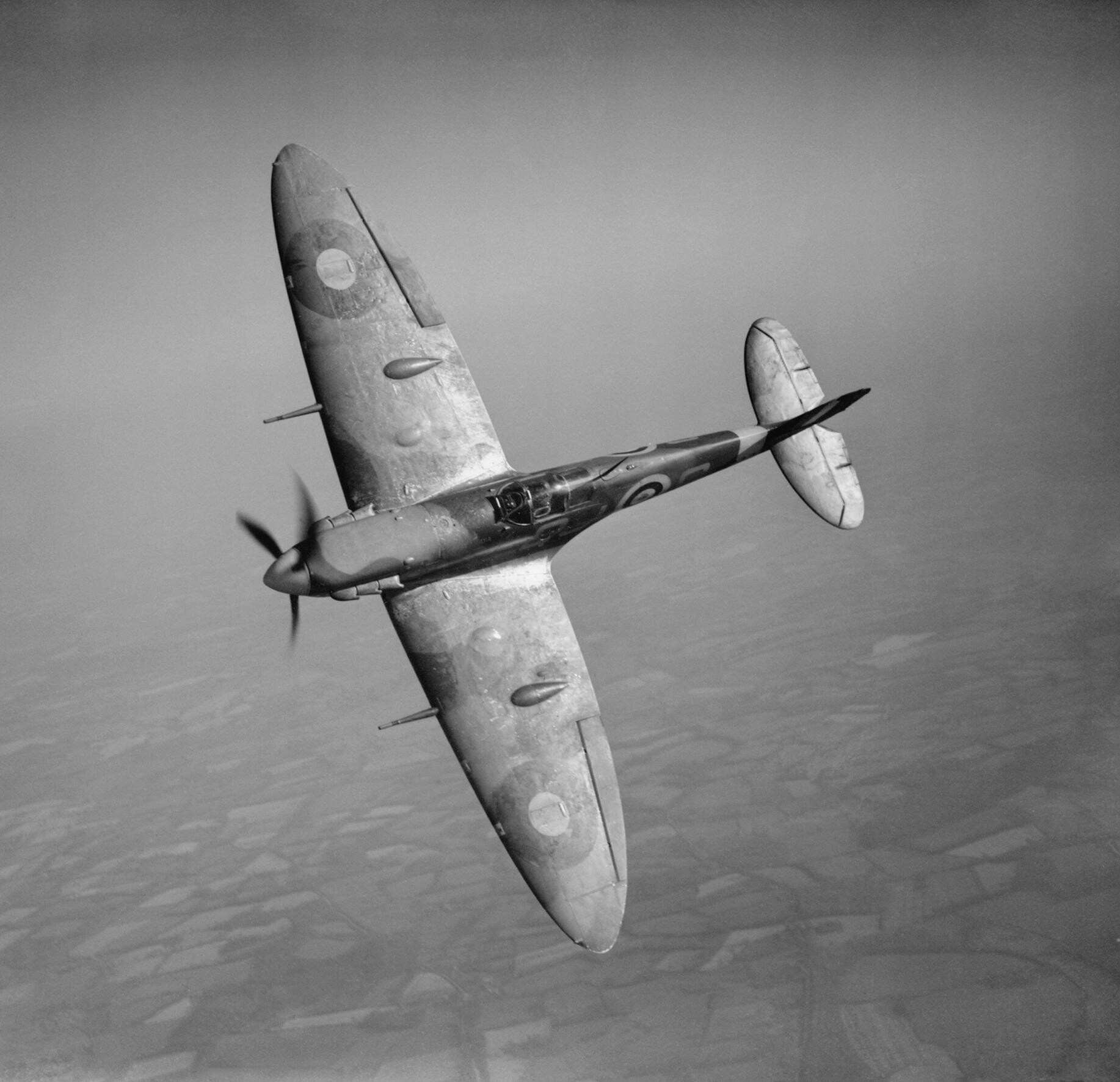
RAF Spitfire Mk VB fighter in flight

The RAF promoted Vašátko to Flight Lieutenant on 28 October 1940, and on 7 November he was given command of "B" flight of 312 Squadron. On 5 June 1941 Vašátko was appointed to command the whole of 312 Squadron. In October the squadron converted from Hurricanes to Supermarine Spitfires. Vašátko was promoted to Squadron Leader on 5 June 1941.

The RAF had three Czechoslovak-manned fighter squadrons: 310 Squadron, 313 Squadron and Vašátko's 312 Squadron. In 1942 it grouped them into a Czechoslovak fighter wing to operate together. On 1 May Vašátko was made its commanding officer and on 30 May 1942 he was promoted to Wing Commander.

Vašátko continued the run of victories he had begun in France. He is credited with shooting down four enemy aircraft single-handed, another ten jointly with other airmen, and probably two more.

=== Death ===
By June 1942, 312 Squadron was based at RAF Exeter. On 23 June a force of Douglas Boston light bombers was sent on a "Ramrod" raid to bomb an airfield in Brittany. Vašátko commanded the bombers' fighter escort, which comprised Spitfire Mk VB aircraft from all three squadrons of the Czechoslovak fighter wing.

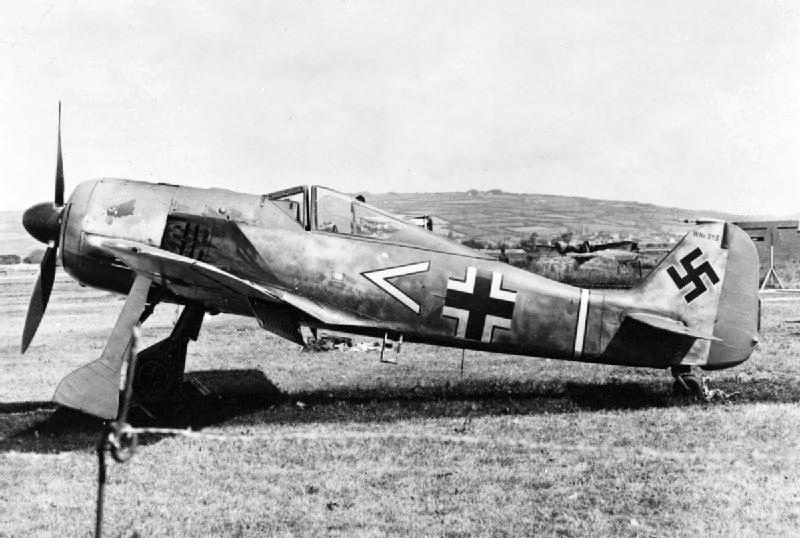
One of the 7./JG 2 Focke-Wulf Fw 190 fighters that intercepted Vašátko's Spitfire escorts on 23 June 1942

As the raiding force was returning to England a Staffel of Focke-Wulf Fw 190 fighters of Jagdgeschwader 2 "Richthofen" from Morlaix airfield intercepted them over the English Channel. The escorts successfully defended the bombers and destroyed two Fw 190s, but seven Spitfires were also destroyed.

Vašátko's Spitfire collided in mid-air with an Fw 190 flown by Unteroffizier Wilhelm Reuschling of 7./JG 2, destroying both aircraft. Reuschling baled out, was rescued from the sea off Start Point, Devon and made a prisoner of war, but Vašátko went down with his 'plane and his body was never recovered.

== Achievements and honours ==
Vašátko became a fighter ace twice: first in the Battle of France and again in the RAF. Among RAFVR Czechoslovak fighter aces, only Sqn Ldr Karel Kuttelwascher and Sgt Josef František shot down more aircraft than Vašátko. As a Wing Commander, Vašátko was one of the RAF's most senior Czechoslovak officers in front-line service. Vašátko had just been awarded his DFC on the day of his death. The Inspector-General of the Czechoslovak Air Force, Air Commodore Karel Janoušek, called Vašátko's death "the most cruel blow to our entire air force".

=== Monuments and memorials ===
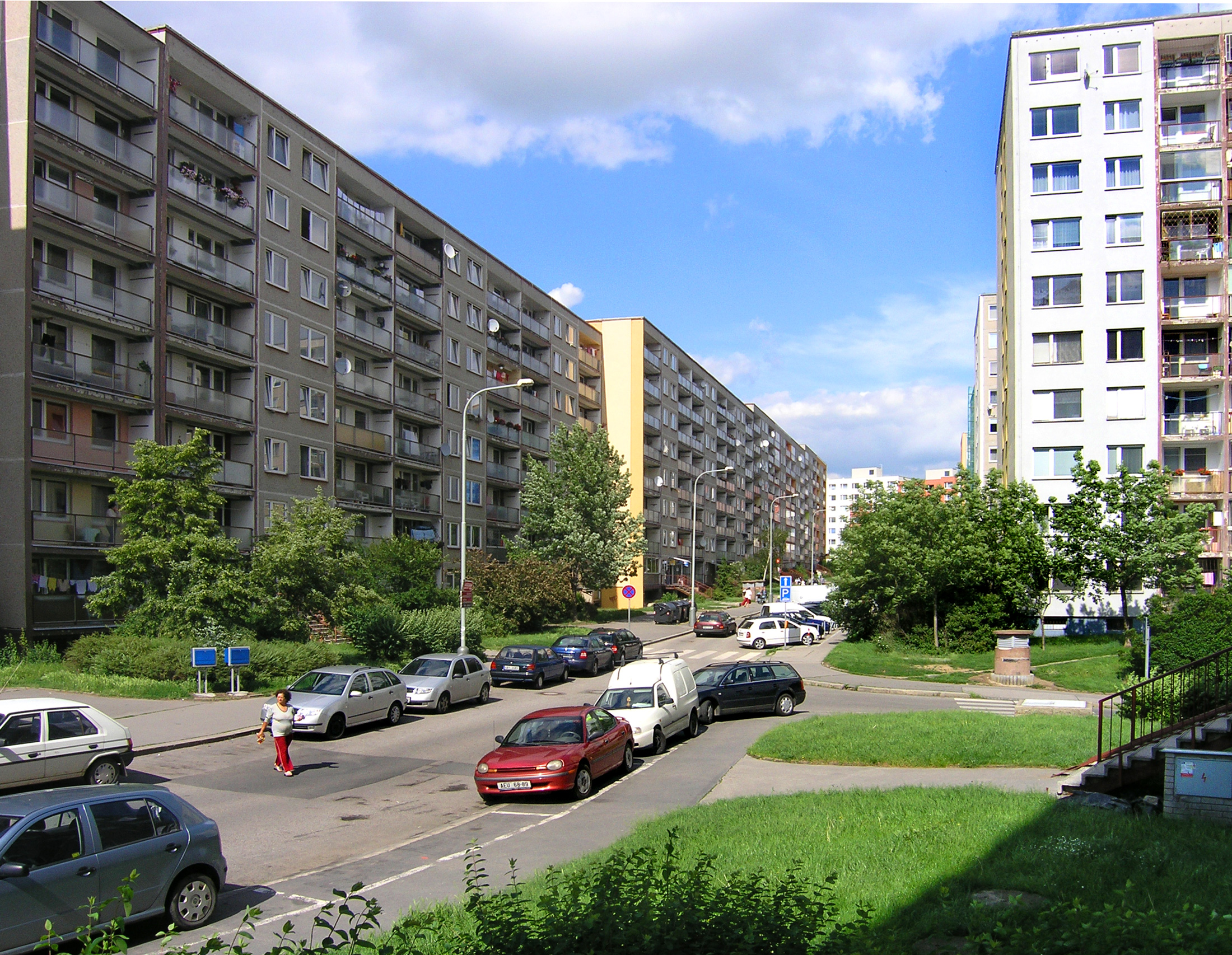
Vašátkova street in the Černý Most suburb of Prague

In 1945 after Germany surrendered, two Czechoslovak postage stamps commemorating Vašátko were issued. The first has a face value of 50 hellers and the second has a face value of five Czechoslovak crowns.

On 23 June 1946, the fourth anniversary of Vašátko's death, a memorial plaque was unveiled at his birthplace in Čelákovice. On 23 June 2012 the 70th anniversary of his death was commemorated with a ceremony at his monument, which included a flypast by two Czech Air Force Saab JAS 39 Gripen multirole combat aircraft.

Three streets are named "Vašátkova" after him. One is in Čelákovice where he was born and another is in Týniště nad Orlicí where he grew up. The other is in the Černý Most suburb of Prague, which has streets named after numerous Second World War Czechoslovak airmen who served in the French Air Force or the RAF.

On 3 March 1948 the Czechoslovak Air Force named its 4th Fighter Regiment "Vašátko", but in a reorganisation in 1950 it was renumbered the 6th Air Regiment and ceased to carry his name.

As Vašátko has no known grave, his name is recorded on the Air Forces Memorial at Runnymede in Surrey.

=== Honours and awards ===
Chevalier de la Légion d'honneur.
Croix de guerre with seven palm leaves, two golden stars and one silver star
Distinguished Flying Cross
1939–1945 Star with Battle of Britain clasp
Air Crew Europe Star
Czechoslovak War Cross 1939–1945 three times
Československá medaile Za chrabrost před nepřítelem ("Bravery in Face of the Enemy") twice
Československá medaile za zásluhy, 1. stupně ("Medal of Merit, First Class")
Pamětní medaile československé armády v zahraničí ("Commemorative Medal of the Czechoslovak Army Abroad") with France and Great Britain bars

Vašátko has received numerous posthumous awards. The Czechoslovak government-in-exile promoted to him to major on 28 October 1942 and lieutenant-colonel on 1 May 1944. On 11 November 1949 Vašátko was awarded the Military Order of the White Lion 1st class. In 1991 the Czech and Slovak Federative Republic promoted him to colonel. On 7 March 1992 it promoted him again to major-general and awarded him the Milan Rastislav Stefanik Order 3rd class.

In 2017, the Czech Mint issued silver and gold commemorative coins (under the authority of Niue) paying tribute to Alois Vašátko.
