= Prague 14 =

Prague 14 Praha 14
- Municipal District of Prague
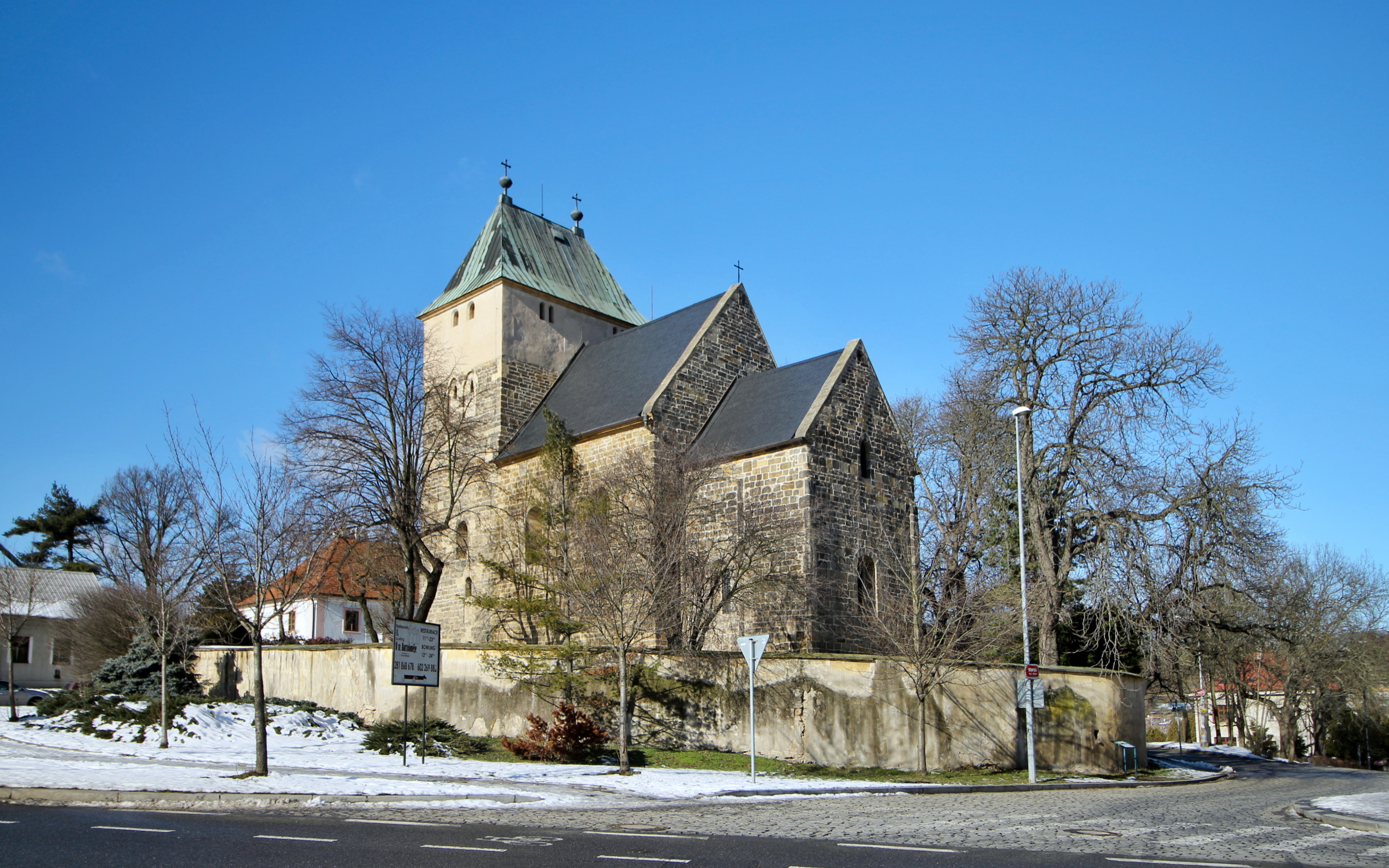
- St. Bartholomew church in Kyje

- Flag Coat of arms

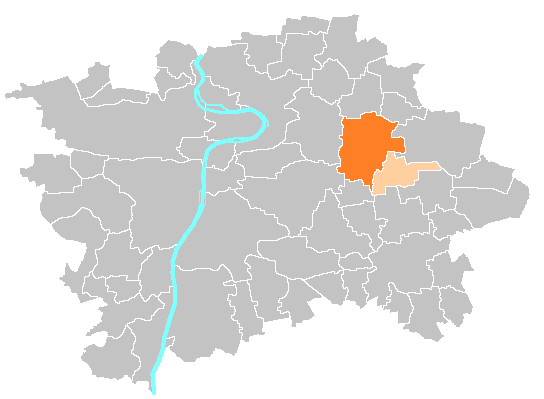
- Location of Prague 14 in Prague
- Coordinates: 50°6′10″N 14°33′8″E
- Country: Czech Republic
- Region: Prague

Government
  - Mayor: Jiří Zajac

Area
  - Total: 13.53 km^{2} (5.22 sq mi)

Population (2021)
  - Total: 47,014
  - Density: 3,475/km^{2} (9,000/sq mi)
- Time zone: UTC+1 (CET)
  - Summer (DST): UTC+2 (CEST)
- Postal code: 198 00
- Website: http://www.praha14.cz

Prague 14 is a municipal district in Prague since 1994. It is located in the north-eastern part of the city, east of district Prague 9. It consists of four cadastres: Hloubětín (part), Kyje, Černý Most and Hostavice.

The administrative district (správní obvod) of the same name consists of municipal districts Prague 14 and Dolní Počernice.

Two notable historic buildings can be found in the district: Saint Bartholomew church in Kyje and Saint George church in Hloubětín, both founded in the 13th century.

== Demographics ==
Historical population
Year	Pop.	±%
1869	1,271	—
1880	1,524	+19.9%
1890	2,083	+36.7%
1900	2,605	+25.1%
1910	4,141	+59.0%
1921	4,078	−1.5%
1930	9,553	+134.3%
1950	12,034	+26.0%
1961	12,507	+3.9%
1970	16,019	+28.1%
1980	17,288	+7.9%
1991	24,301	+40.6%
2001	36,778	+51.3%
2011	47,025	+27.9%
2021	47,014	−0.0%
Source: Censuses

== See also ==
- Districts of Prague § Symbols
