= Čelákovice =

- Town
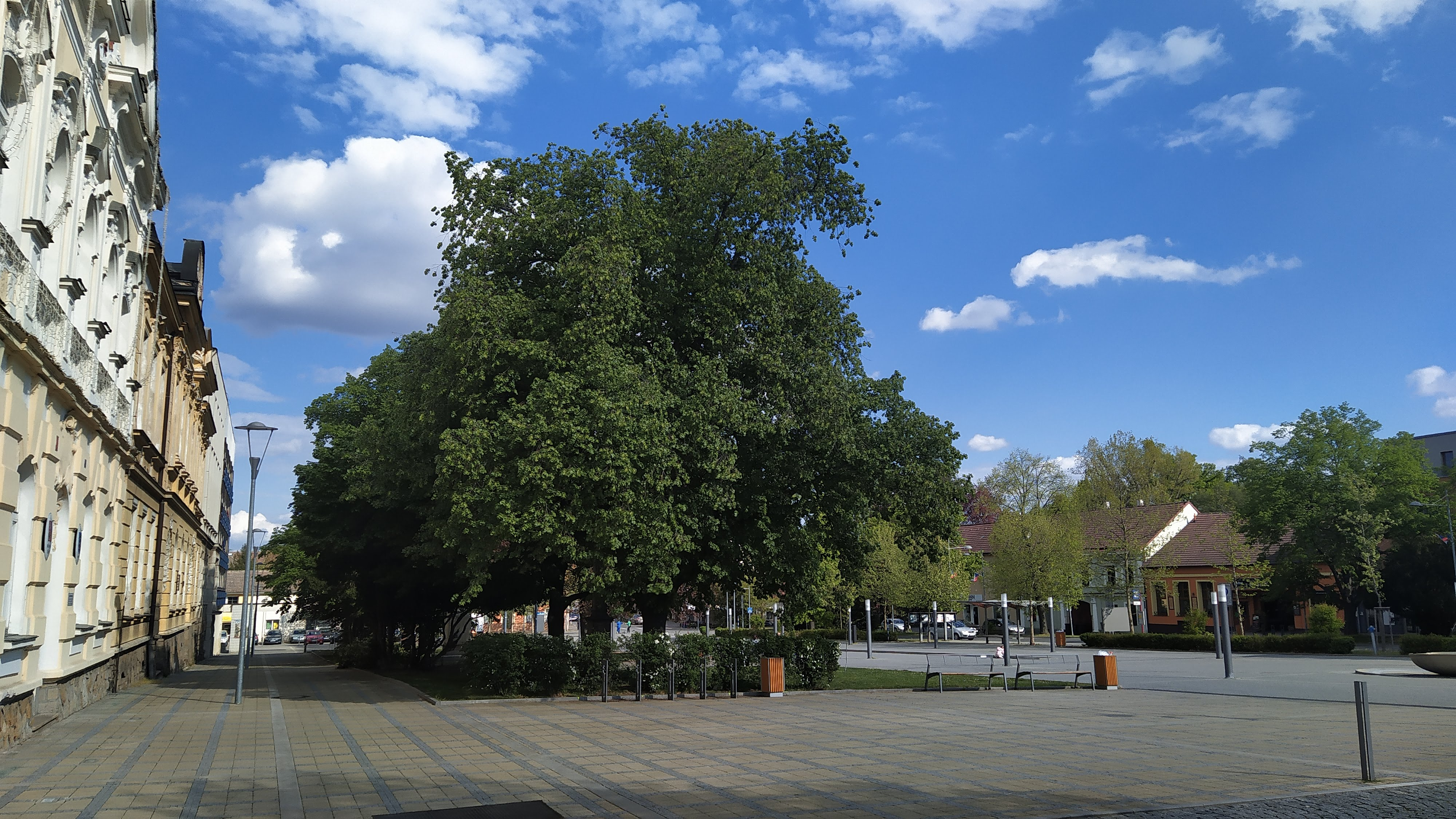
- The square Náměstí 5. května

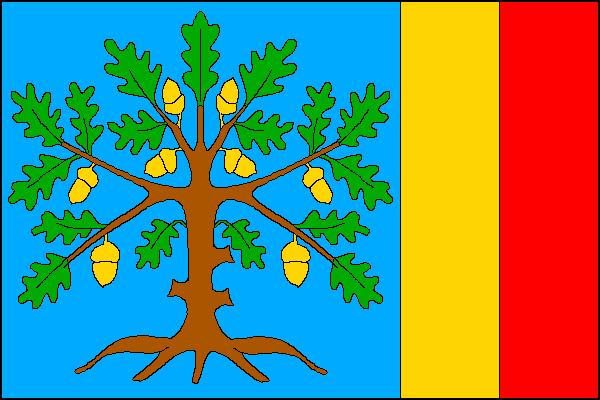
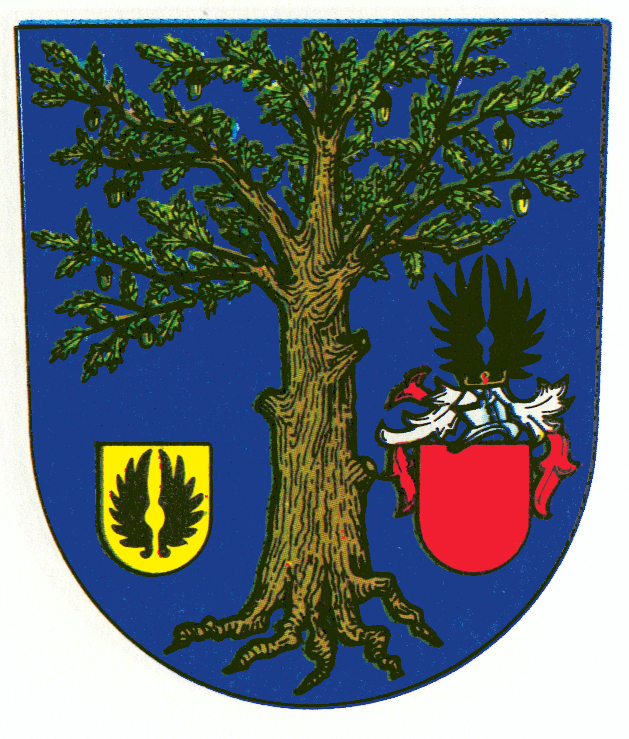
- Flag Coat of arms

- Location in the Czech Republic
- Coordinates: 50°9′38″N 14°45′0″E
- Country: Czech Republic
- Region: Central Bohemian
- District: Prague-East
- First mentioned: 1290

Government
  - Mayor: Josef Pátek (ODS)

Area
  - Total: 15.88 km^{2} (6.13 sq mi)
- Elevation: 184 m (604 ft)

Population (2025-01-01)
  - Total: 12,474
  - Density: 785.5/km^{2} (2,034/sq mi)
- Time zone: UTC+1 (CET)
  - Summer (DST): UTC+2 (CEST)
- Postal code: 250 88
- Website: www.celakovice.cz

Čelákovice (Czech pronunciation: [ˈtʃɛlaːkovɪtsɛ]) is a town in Prague-East District in the Central Bohemian Region of the Czech Republic. It has about 12,000 inhabitants. The town is located on the Elbe River in the Central Elbe Table.

== Administrative division ==
Čelákovice consists of four municipal parts (in brackets population according to the 2021 census):

- Čelákovice (10,901)
- Císařská Kuchyně (98)
- Sedlčánky (898)
- Záluží (367)

== Geography ==
Čelákovice is located about 15 kilometres (9 mi) east of Prague. It lies in the Central Elbe Table, in the Polabí lowlands. The town is situated on the left bank of the Elbe River.

== History ==
The site of the town has been inhabited since the Stone Age. During the 9th century, an early Slavic settlement was established. The first written mention of Čelákovice is from 1290. The inhabitants subsisted on fishing and agriculture, and from the mid-19th century also on the production of baskets.

== Demographics ==
Historical population

Year	Pop.	±%
1869	2,247	—
1880	2,515	+11.9%
1890	2,584	+2.7%
1900	2,829	+9.5%
1910	3,752	+32.6%

Year	Pop.	±%
1921	4,042	+7.7%
1930	5,411	+33.9%
1950	7,342	+35.7%
1961	8,226	+12.0%
1970	9,395	+14.2%

Year	Pop.	±%
1980	10,390	+10.6%
1991	10,295	−0.9%
2001	10,031	−2.6%
2011	11,866	+18.3%
2021	12,264	+3.4%

Source: Censuses

== Economy ==
TOS (Továrna obráběcích strojů), a machine tool manufacturer, has a plant in Čelákovice. The largest industrial employer with headquarters in Čelákovice is Fermata, a CD and DVD manufacturer with more than 100 employees.

== Transport ==
Čelákovice is located on the railway lines Prague–Kolín and Neratovice–Čelákovice.

== Sights ==
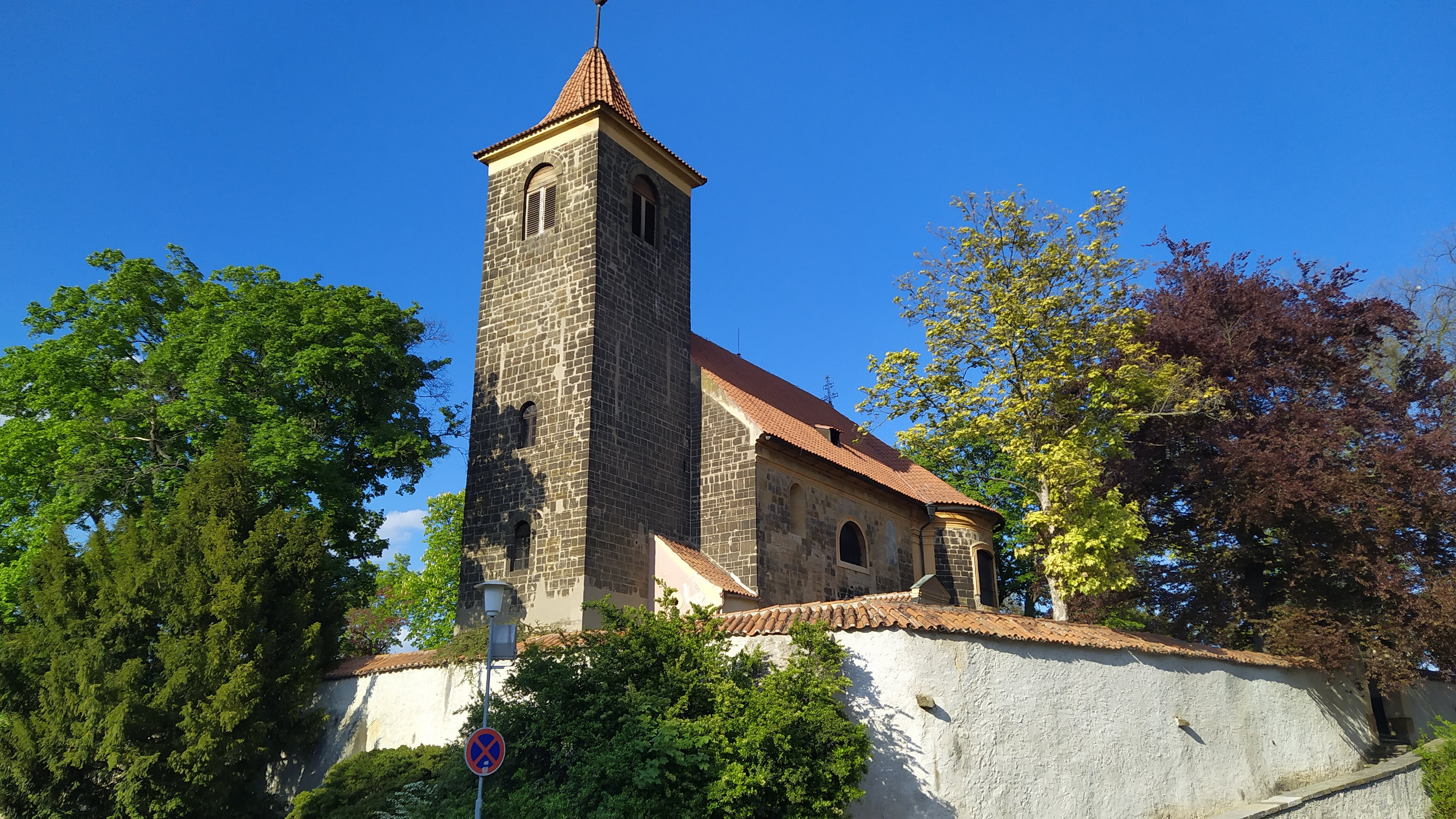
Church of the Assumption of the Virgin Mary

Around 1300, a stone fortress was built here. The fortress, reconstructed in 1973–1982 in the Gothic–Renaissance style, serves today as the town museum.

The Church of the Assumption of the Virgin Mary was originally a Romanesque structure, rebuilt in the Renaissance style in the 16th century and in the Baroque style in 1708–1712.

The main landmark of the town square is the town hall. It was built in the neo-Baroque style in 1911.

== Notable people ==
- Alois Vašátko (1908–1942), World War II wing commander
- František Čáp (1913–1972), Czech-Yugoslav film director and screenwriter
- Eduard Petiška (1924–1987), writer of children books
- Pavel Tykač (born 1964), entrepreneur

== International relations ==
Čelákovice has no twin towns. The town has a cooperation agreement with Chengdu, China.

== Gallery ==
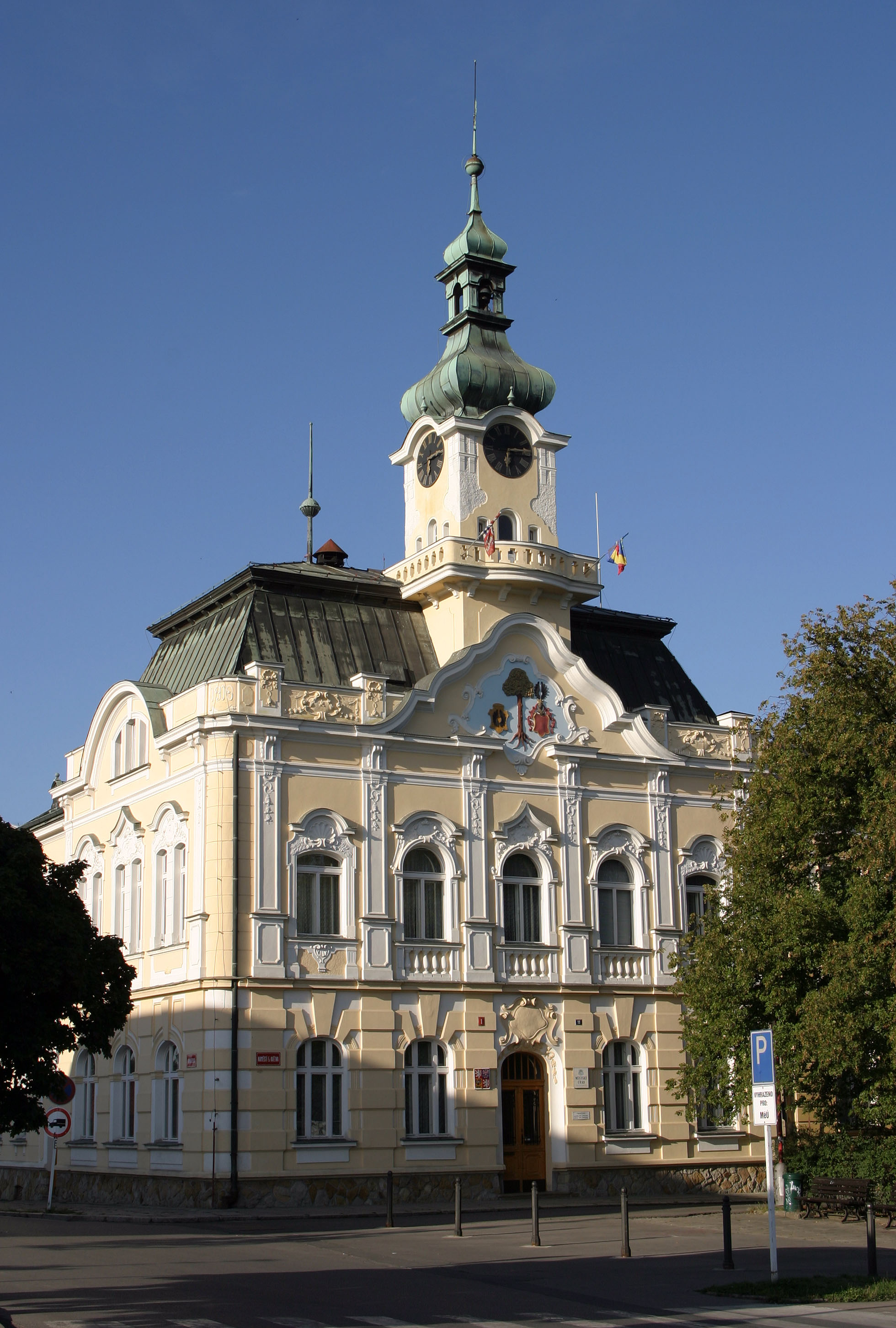
Town hall

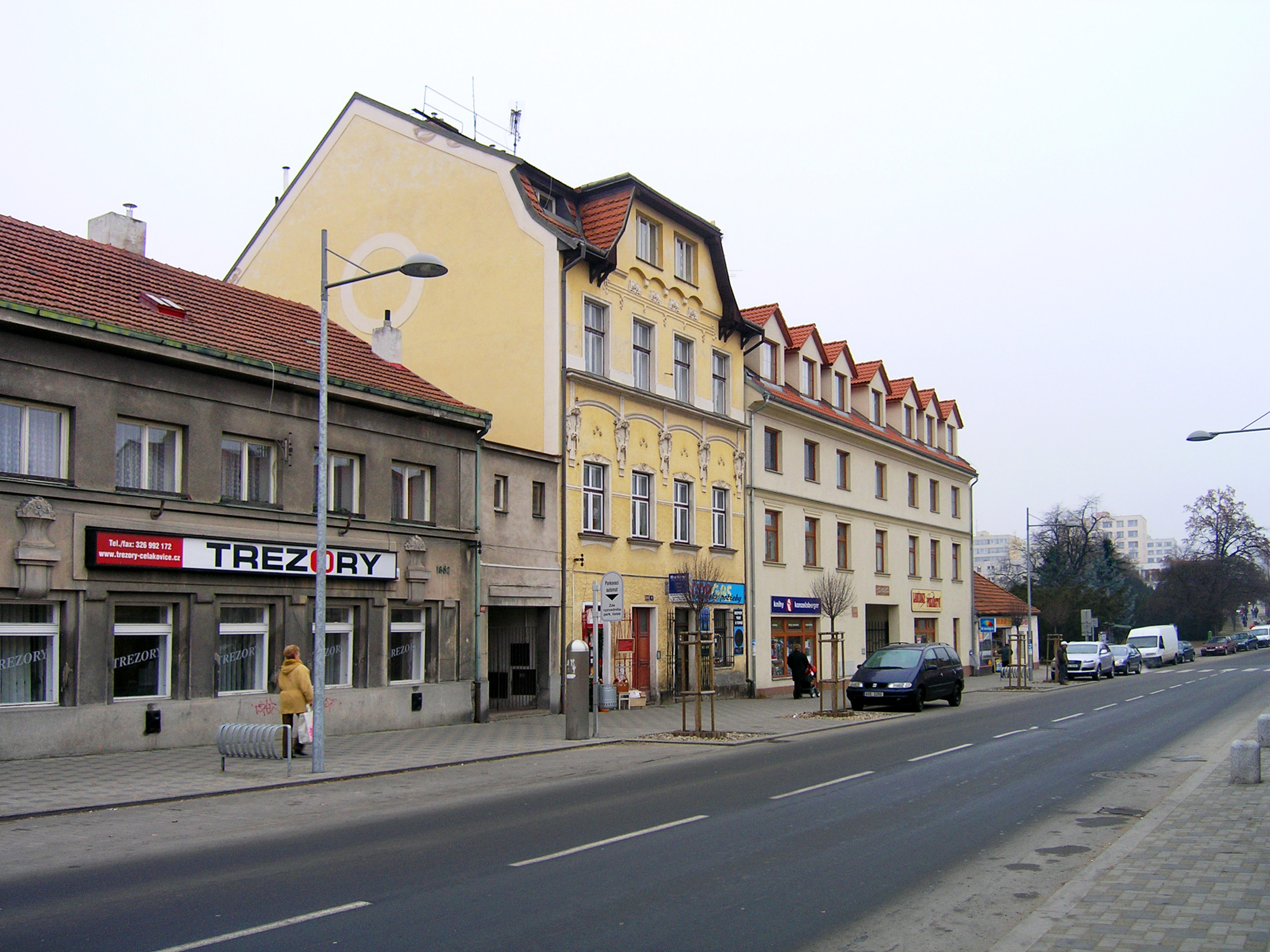
Sedláčkova street

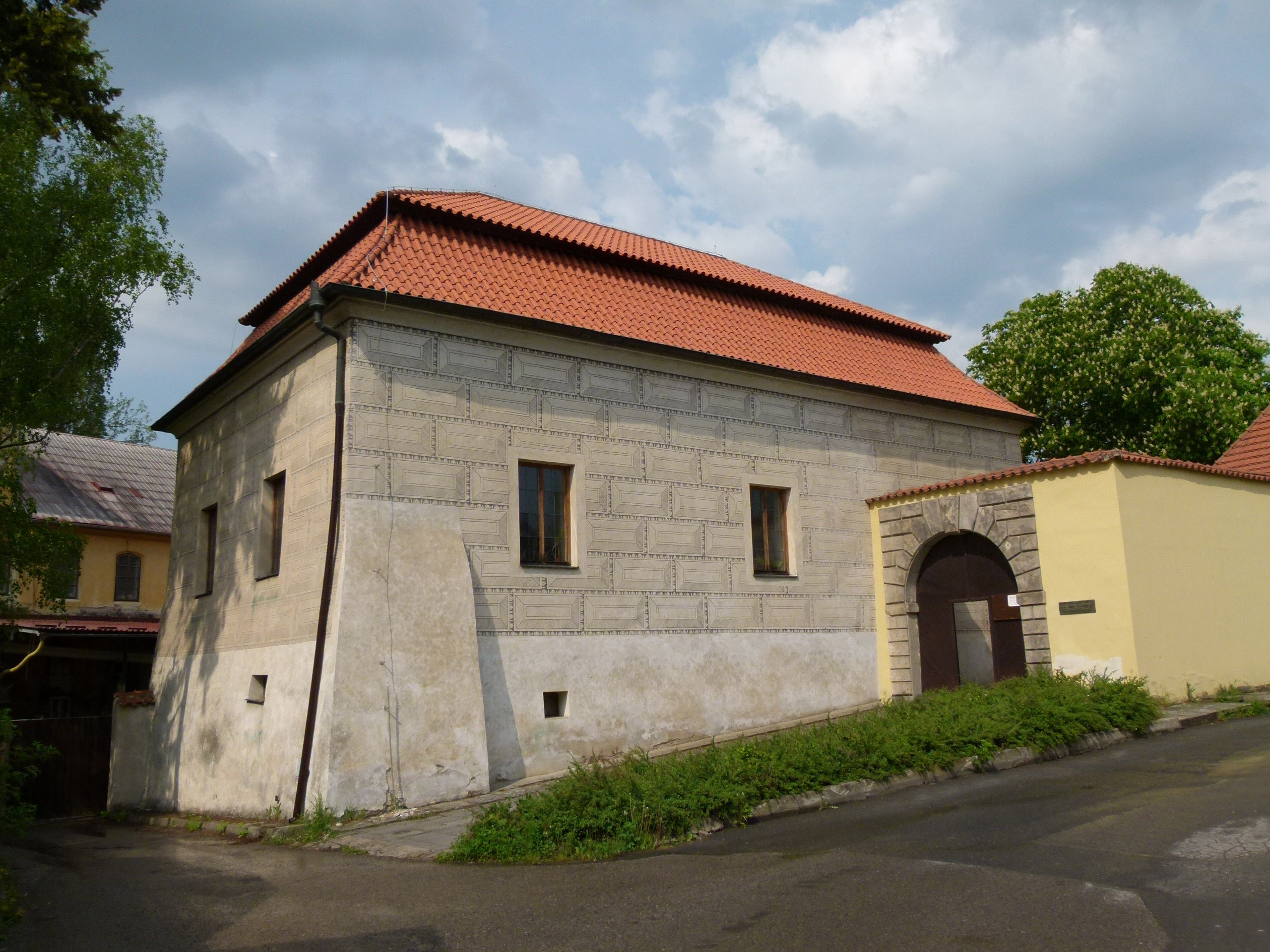
Former fortress, now the Town Museum

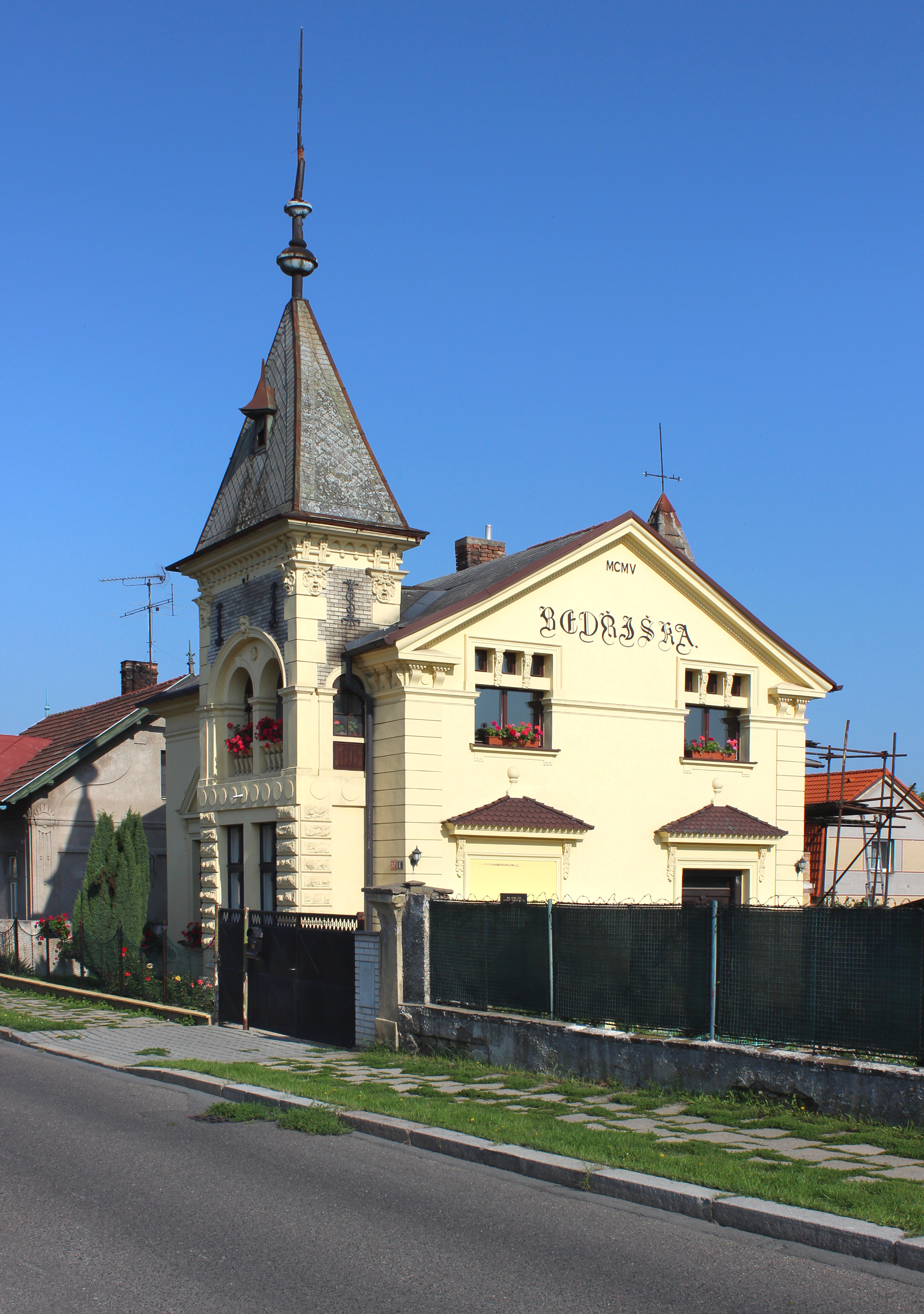
Palackého street
