= Kyje =

Cadastral district of Prague in Czech Republic

- Cadastral district
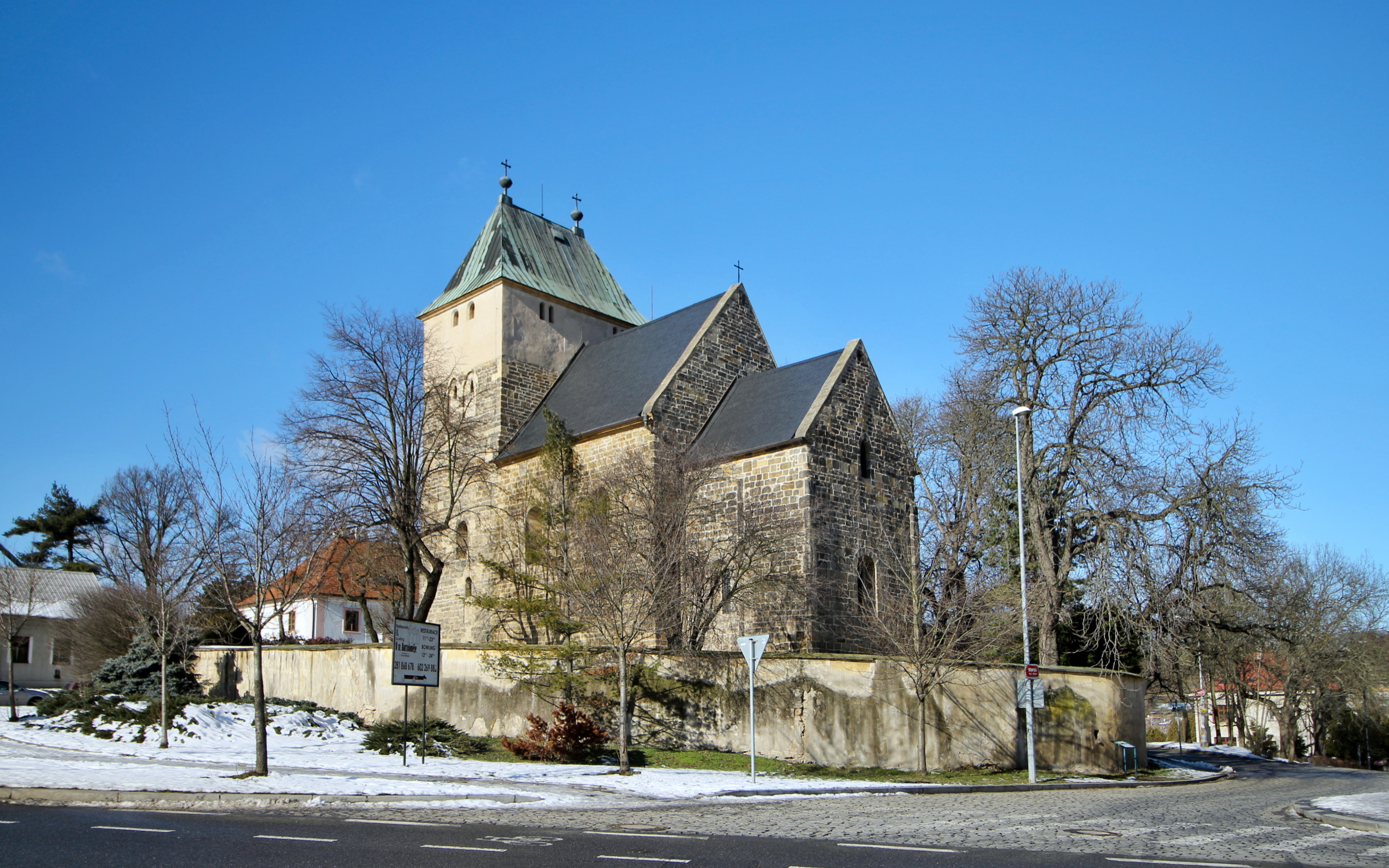
- Church of Saint Bartholomew

- Flag Coat of arms

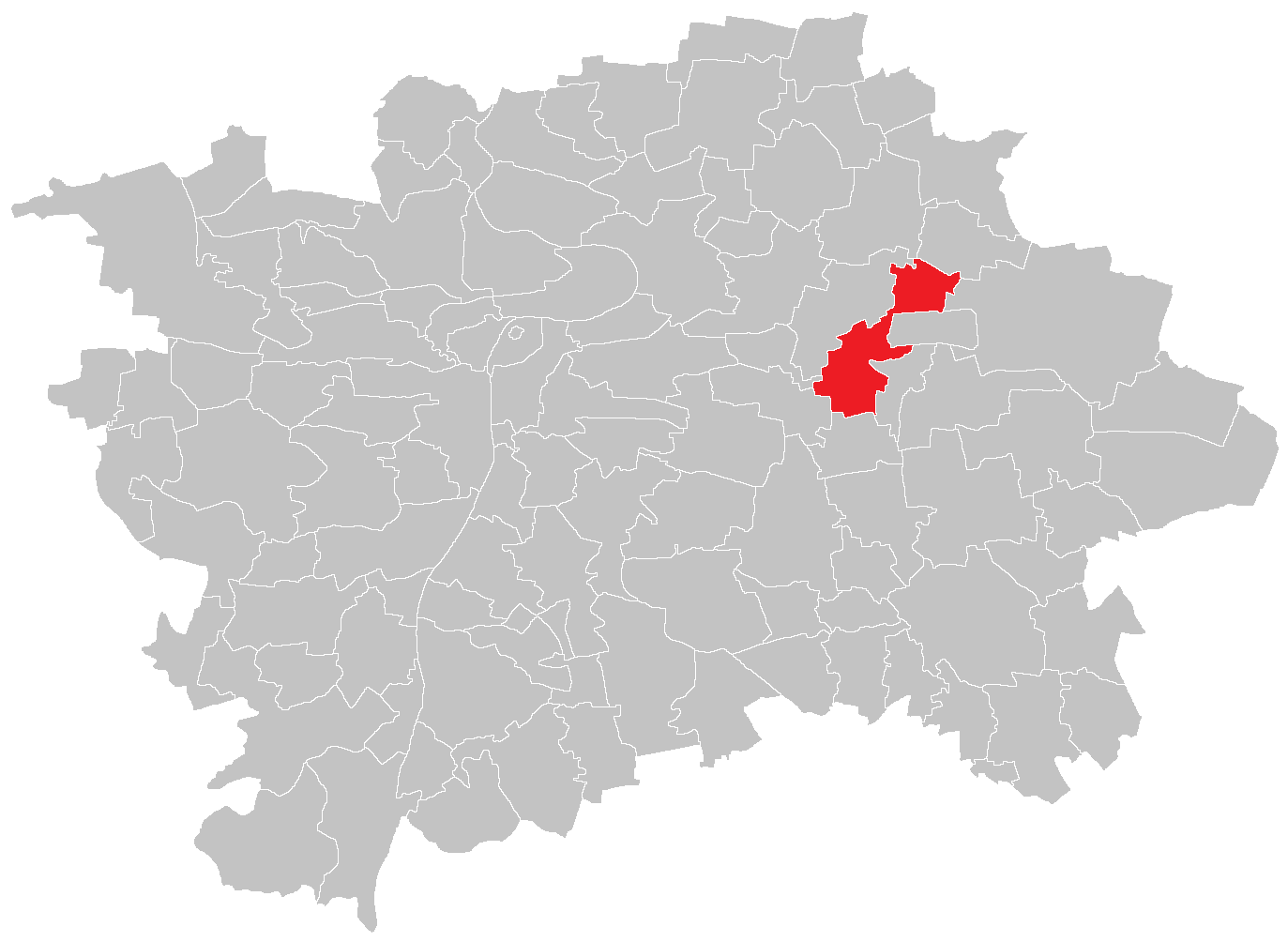
- Location of Kyje in Prague
- Coordinates: 50°5′51″N 14°32′54″E
- Country: Czech Republic
- Region: Prague
- District: Prague 14
- First mentioned: 1289
- Incorporated into Prague: 1968

Area
  - Total: 5.69 km^{2} (2.20 sq mi)

Population (2021)
  - Total: 10,031
  - Density: 1,760/km^{2} (4,570/sq mi)
- Time zone: UTC+1 (CET)
  - Summer (DST): UTC+2 (CEST)
- Postal code: 198 00

Kyje (German: Keeg) is a cadastral district of Prague, Czech Republic. In 2015 it had 9,036 inhabitants.

== Geography ==
The Kyjský Pond is located in the area.

== Demographics ==
Historical population

Year	Pop.	±%
1869	453	—
1880	574	+26.7%
1890	656	+14.3%
1900	717	+9.3%
1910	986	+37.5%
1921	948	−3.9%
1930	1,756	+85.2%
1950	4,397	+150.4%

Year	Pop.	±%
1961	4,741	+7.8%
1970	4,550	−4.0%
1980	7,495	+64.7%
1991	5,241	−30.1%
2001	6,249	+19.2%
2011	9,347	+49.6%
2021	10,031	+7.3%

Source: Censuses

== Sights ==
The main landmark is the Church of Saint Bartholomew. It was built in the Romanesque style, probably between 1226 and 1236.

Doubravka XIV is a modern observation tower built in 2017–2018. It has a height of 23.5 m (77 ft).

== Gallery ==
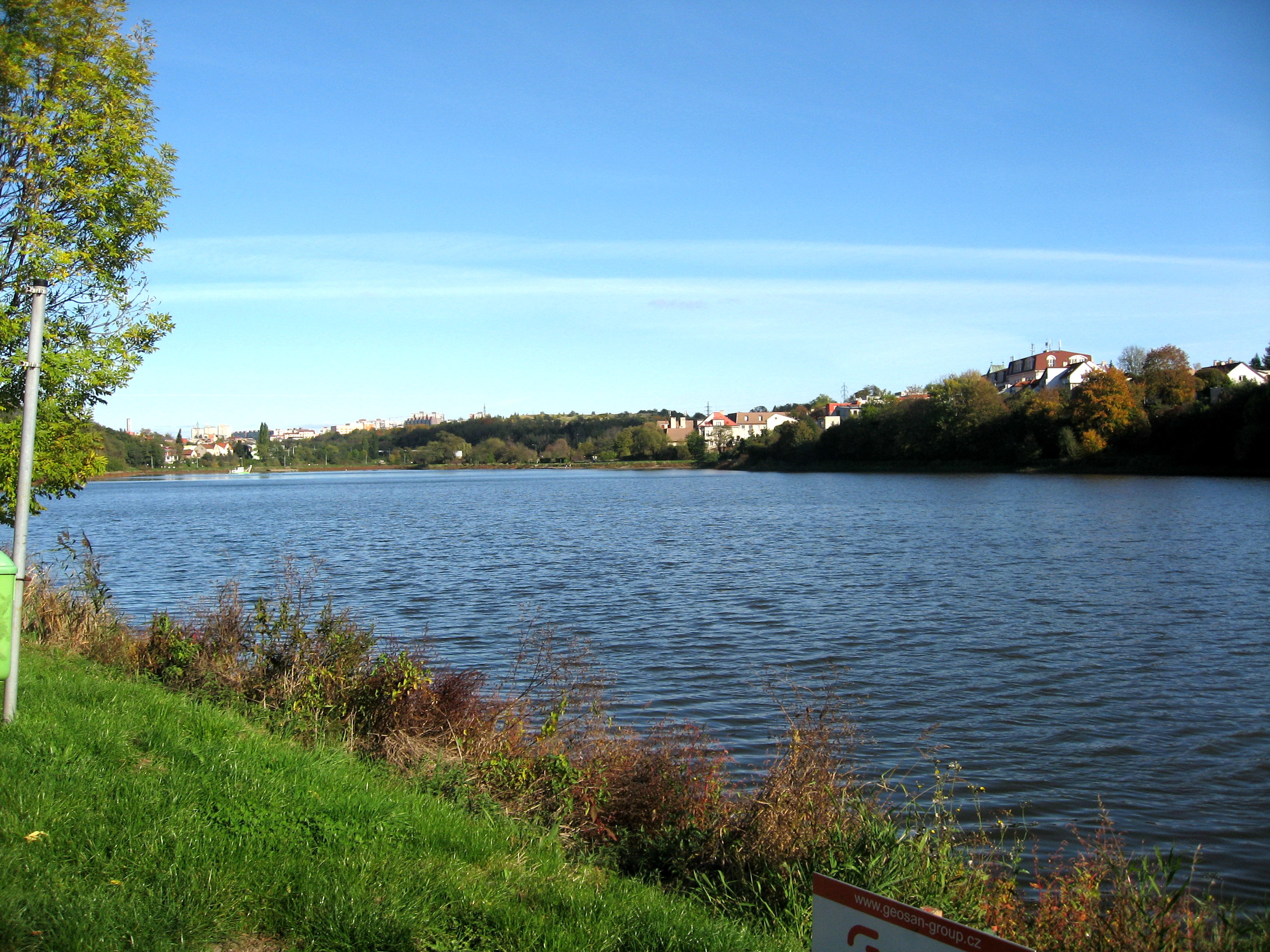
Kyjský Pond

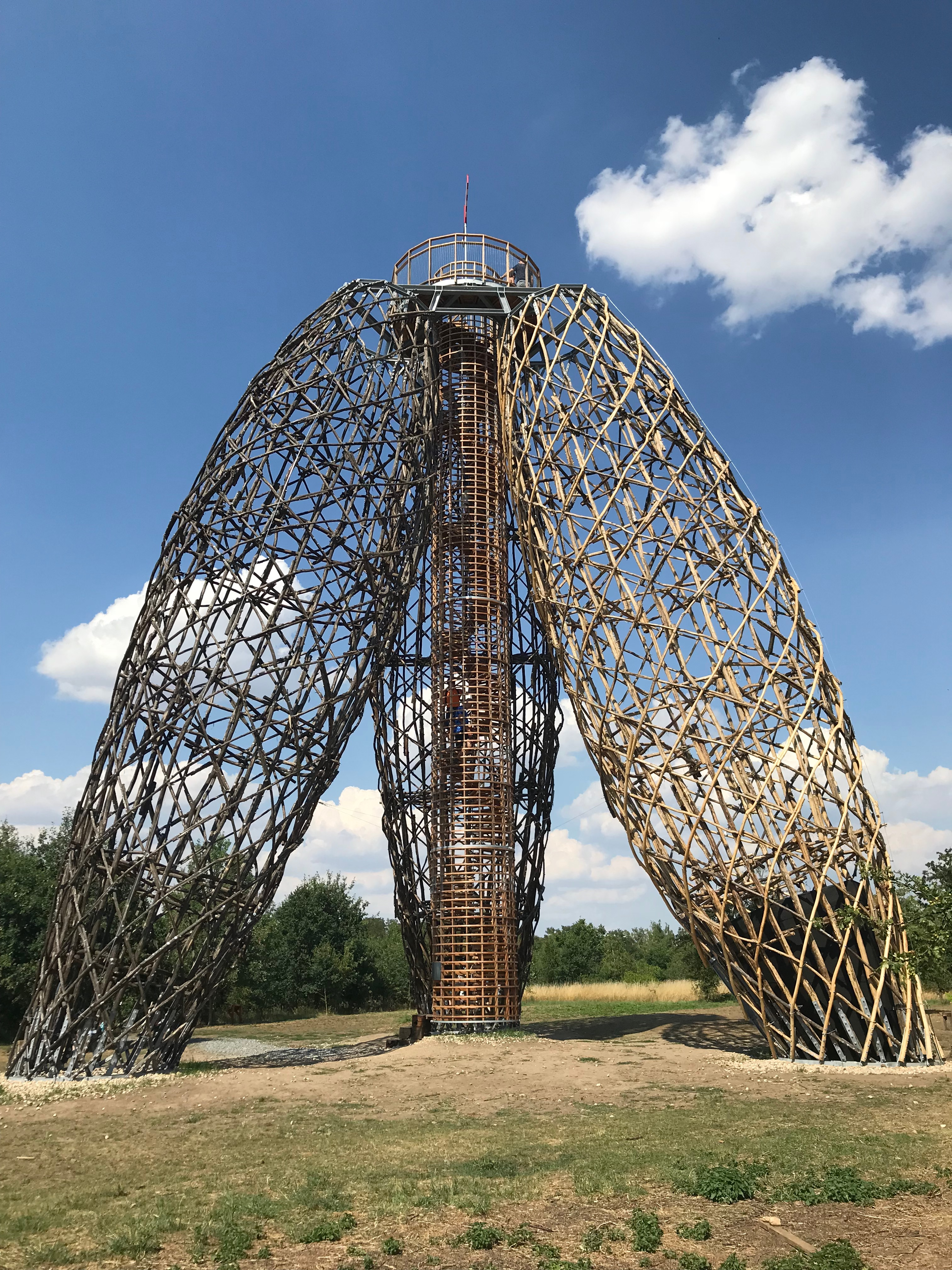
Doubravka XIV observation tower
