= Dolní Počernice =

- Municipal District of Prague; Cadastral Area of Prague
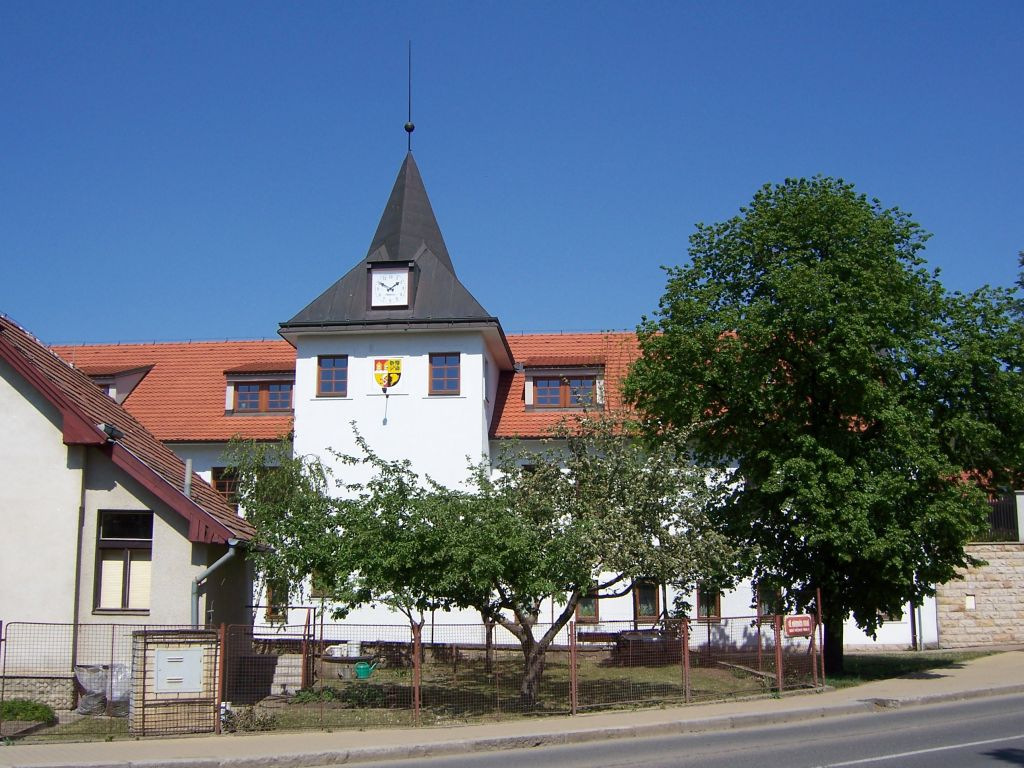
- Dolní Počernice town hall

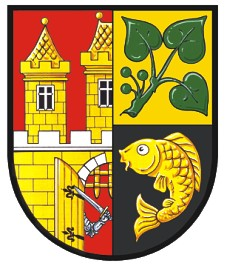
- Flag Coat of arms

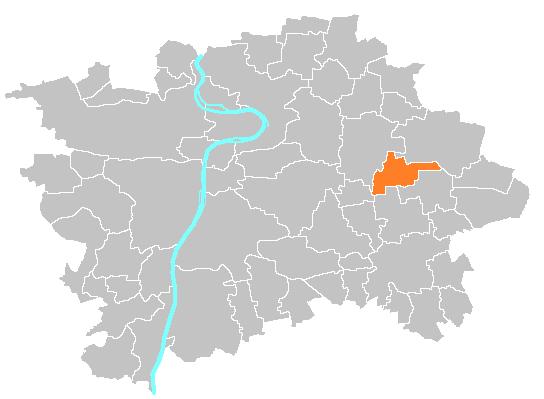
- Location of Dolní Počernice in Prague
- Coordinates: 50°5′9″N 14°34′32″E
- Country: Czech Republic
- Region: Prague
- District: Prague 14

Government
  - Mayor: Zbyněk Richter

Area
  - Total: 5.76 km^{2} (2.22 sq mi)

Population (2021)
  - Total: 2,802
  - Density: 486/km^{2} (1,260/sq mi)
- Time zone: UTC+1 (CET)
  - Summer (DST): UTC+2 (CEST)
- Postal code: 190 12
- Website: http://www.praha-dolnipocernice.cz

Dolní Počernice (German: Unter Potschernitz) is a municipal district (městská část) and cadastral area (katastrální území) in Prague. It is located in the eastern part of the city. As of 2021, there were 2,802 inhabitants living in Dolní Počernice.

The first written record of Dolní Počernice is from the 14th century. The village became part of Prague in 1974.

== Demographics ==
Historical population
Year	Pop.	±%
1869	426	—
1880	522	+22.5%
1890	591	+13.2%
1900	649	+9.8%
1910	807	+24.3%
1921	853	+5.7%
1930	2,191	+156.9%
1950	2,334	+6.5%
1961	2,322	−0.5%
1970	2,102	−9.5%
1980	1,996	−5.0%
1991	1,780	−10.8%
2001	1,751	−1.6%
2011	2,247	+28.3%
2021	2,802	+24.7%
Source: Censuses
