= Esko Prague =

Czech commuter rail

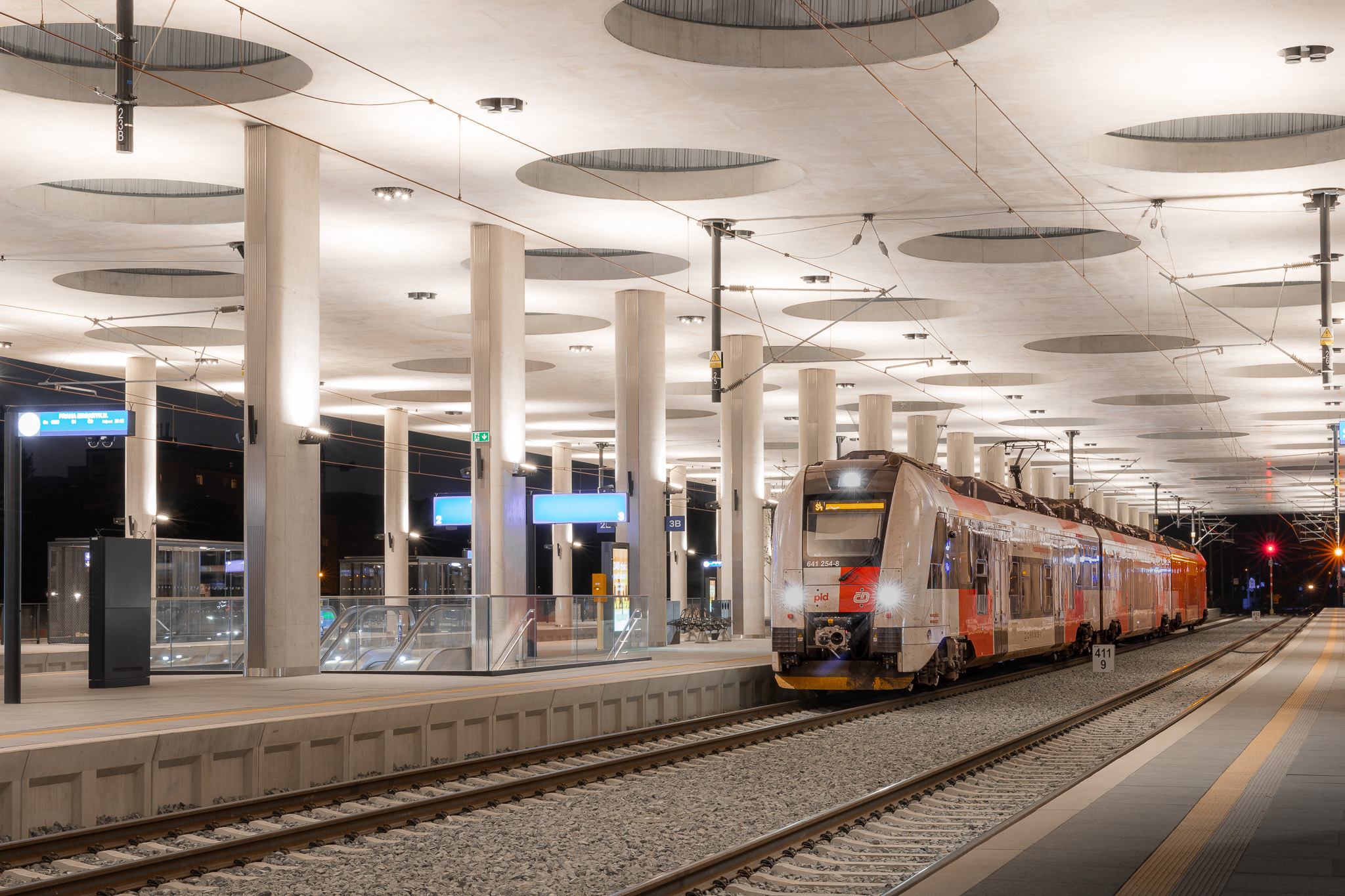
- RegioPanter EMU on the S4 line at Praha-Bubny

Overview
- Locale: Prague and Central Bohemian Region
- Transit type: Commuter rail
- Number of lines: 49 S lines
- Number of stations: 392 (45 in Prague)
- Annual ridership: 57 million (2025)
- Website: PID Trains

Operation
- Began operation: 2007
- Operators: Czech Railways, Arriva, KŽC, RegioJet

Technical
- System length: 1,183 km (735 mi) (160 km (99 mi) in Prague)
- Track gauge: 1,435 mm (4 ft 8 1/2 in) (standard gauge)

Esko Prague is a commuter rail network within Prague Integrated Transport (PID), connecting Prague with the surrounding Central Bohemian Region and also providing rail services within Prague. Trains on which the PID fare applies are designated as S or R. Selected long-distance trains (R) are integrated into PID, with PID tickets valid on sections included in the system.

The Esko system was introduced in December 2007 and the opening of Nové spojení in 2008 increased rail capacity through central Prague.

== Lines ==
CityElefant EMU at Praha hlavní nádraží

Map of the Esko Prague network

The following S lines are part of the Esko network.

=== Main lines ===
Line	Route	Length (km)	Stations	Weekday interval	Weekend interval	Notes
S1	Praha Masarykovo nádraží – Český Brod – Poříčany – Kolín	62	20	30–60 min.	30–60 min.	
S2	Praha hlavní nádraží – Lysá nad Labem – Nymburk – Kolín	73	21	30–60 min.	60 min.	
S3	Praha hlavní nádraží – Neratovice – Všetaty – Mělník	—	—	60 min.	60 min.	
S4	Praha Masarykovo nádraží – Kralupy nad Vltavou – Hněvice	57	21	30–60 min.	60–120 min.	Continues from Hněvice towards Ústí nad Labem as line U4
S5	Praha Masarykovo nádraží – Kladno	33	12	60 min.	60 min.	Some trains continue towards Kralupy nad Vltavou as S45.
S6	Praha-Smíchov – Rudná u Prahy – Beroun	34	14	30–60 min.	60–120 min.	More frequent service operates between Prague and Nučice.
S7	Praha hlavní nádraží – Řevnice – Beroun	43	13	15–30 min.	30 min.	
S8	Praha hlavní nádraží – Vrané nad Vltavou – Čerčany	60	25	60 min.	120 min.	
S9	Milovice – Praha hlavní nádraží – Strančice – Benešov	89	28	15–30 min.	30 min.	The Milovice–Prague section operates during weekday peak periods and replaces some S22 services.
S22	Praha hlavní nádraží – Lysá nad Labem – Milovice	40	10	60 min.	60 min.	Some weekday peak services are replaced by extended S9 trains
S34	Praha Masarykovo nádraží – Praha-Čakovice	19	6	60 min.	—	Operates on weekdays only; operated by KŽC Doprava
S49	Praha-Hostivař – Praha-Libeň – Praha-Holešovice – Roztoky u Prahy	21	6	30 min.	60 min.	Operated by RegioJet
S61	Praha hlavní nádraží – Úvaly	23	8	30 min.	60 min.	Operated by RegioJet
S88	Praha hlavní nádraží – Vrané nad Vltavou – Čisovice – Dobříš	55	23	60 min.	120 min.	Some weekday trains terminate at Čisovice

=== Regional and connecting lines ===
Line	Route	Notes
S10	Kolín – Přelouč	
S11	Pečky – Kouřim	
S12	Poříčany – Nymburk	
S18	Kolín – Ledečko – Sázava	
S20	Kolín – Kutná Hora – Čáslav – Světlá nad Sázavou	
S21	Nymburk – Jičín	
S23	Čelákovice – Brandýs nad Labem – Neratovice	
S27	Čáslav – Třemošnice	
S28	Kutná Hora – Zruč nad Sázavou	
S30	Všetaty – Mladá Boleslav	
S31	Nymburk – Mladá Boleslav	
S32	Lysá nad Labem – Štětí	
S33	Mělník – Mšeno – Mladá Boleslav	
S35	Mladá Boleslav – Turnov	
S36	Mladá Boleslav – Mladějov – Lomnice nad Popelkou	
S40	Kralupy nad Vltavou – Slaný	Continues from Slaný towards Louny as line U40
S43	Neratovice – Kralupy nad Vltavou	
S44	Kralupy nad Vltavou – Velvary	
S45	Kladno – Kralupy nad Vltavou	Some trains continue to or from Prague as S5
S50	Kladno – Rakovník	
S54	Prague – Hostivice – Středokluky – Slaný	
S57	Rakovník – Blatno u Jesenice – Žlutice	
S58	Rakovník – Kralovice	Operated by Die Länderbahn
S59	Protivec – Bochov	Seasonal service
S60	Beroun – Březnice – Blatná – Strakonice	
S65	Prague – Hostivice – Rudná u Prahy	
S66	Březnice – Písek – Protivín	
S70	Beroun – Hořovice – Kařez	
S75	Beroun – Rakovník	
S76	Zadní Třebaň – Liteň – Lochovice	
S80	Čerčany – Ledečko – Zruč nad Sázavou	
S82	Zruč nad Sázavou – Světlá nad Sázavou	
S90	Olbramovice – Tábor	
S98	Benešov – Olbramovice – Sedlčany	
S99	Benešov – Vlašim	

== Numbering system ==
The main radial S lines are numbered S1 to S9, starting east of Prague and continuing counter-clockwise around the city. Other S lines use two-digit numbers; some connect two main routes, while others serve as branches.

Faster services integrated into PID use the letter R. Some metropolitan R lines are numbered according to the S corridor they follow, while other R lines are long-distance services that are integrated into PID only on part of their route.

== Rolling stock ==
First class interior of a RegioPanter EMU

Most services on the main electrified lines are operated by České dráhy, mainly with Class 471 CityElefant double-deck electric multiple units, of which 71 are used in the PID system, and Class 640 RegioPanter units, 22 of which were ordered for PID services towards Ústí nad Labem and Čáslav.

Since 1 April 2025, lines S49 and S61 have been operated by RegioJet with new three-car low-floor Pesa Elf.eu electric multiple units in PID livery.

Non-electrified regional lines are served by České dráhy diesel multiple units. 38 Class 847 RegioFox units in PID livery operate mainly from Prague to Mělník and to Beroun via Rudná, on the Posázavský pacifik and between Beroun and Rakovník, including lines S3, S8 and S88; they replaced Class 854 units. Less busy lines use modernised RegioSpider railcars, 34 of which are being deployed in the Central Bohemian Region to replace Class 810 railcars and Class 814 Regionova units, which remain in service on less busy lines.

== Future development ==
Several major railway projects are expected to improve the Esko network. The proposed Nové spojení 2 would add new underground rail connections through central Prague, increasing capacity and allowing more suburban and regional trains to run across the city rather than terminating at central stations.

Another major project is the modernisation of the railway between Prague and Kladno and the construction of a rail connection to Václav Havel Airport Prague. Parts of the Prague–Kladno route are already under construction, while a new branch from Praha-Ruzyně to the airport is in preparation.

In September 2026, Prague and the Central Bohemian Region approved a 30-year contract worth 165.17 billion CZK with České dráhy for electric services in the PID system. It covers 60 new units, up to 133 with options, which are to replace the CityElefants from December 2030. The vehicle tender was won by Škoda Transportation, but the contract could not yet be signed because Stadler's challenge of that result was pending before the Czech antimonopoly office.
