= AirLony =

Czech aircraft manufacturer

AirLony Aircraft Company
- Company type: Privately held company
- Industry: Aerospace
- Founded: 1990s
- Headquarters: Štětí, Czech Republic
- Products: Kit aircraft and complete ultralight aircraft
- Website: www.airlony.cz

AirLony is a Czech aircraft manufacturer based in Štětí. The company specializes in the design and manufacture of complete ultralight aircraft and aircraft kits for amateur construction.

The company's sole current product is the AirLony Skylane UL, which is a two-seat ultralight replica of the four seat Cessna 182.

== Aircraft ==
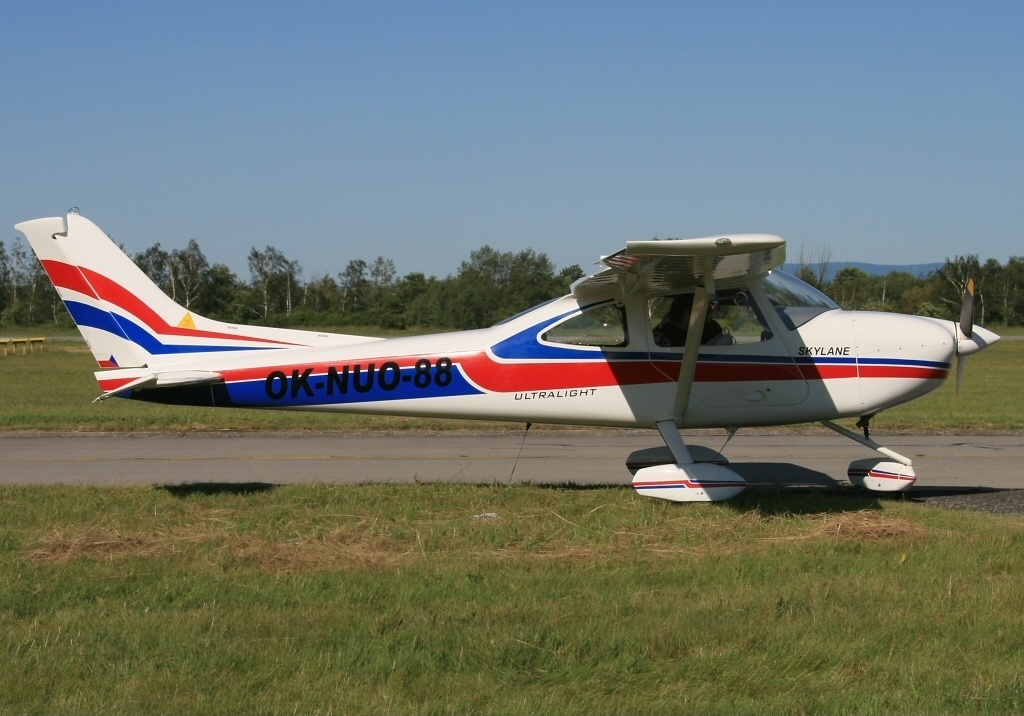
AirLony Skylane UL.

Summary of aircraft built by AirLony
Model name	First flight	Number built	Type
AirLony Highlander	1998		ultralight biplane
AirLony Skylane UL	2005		ultralight Cessna 182 replica
