= AirLony Highlander =

Czech ultralight biplane

Highlander

General information
- Type: Ultralight aircraft
- National origin: Czech Republic
- Manufacturer: AirLony
- Status: Production completed

History
- Introduction date: 1998

The AirLony Highlander is a Czech ultralight biplane that was designed and produced by AirLony of Štětí, introduced in 1998.

== Design and development ==
The aircraft was designed to comply with the Fédération Aéronautique Internationale microlight rules. It features a biplane wing configuration, a two-seats-in-tandem open cockpit, fixed conventional landing gear and a single engine in tractor configuration.

The aircraft has a composite fuselage and wooden-framed 7.3 m (24.0 ft) span wings with doped aircraft fabric covering. Engines in the 80 to 120 hp (60 to 89 kW) can be used. The Highlander was designed for, but never approved for aerobatics.

== Specifications (Highlander) ==
Data from Bayerl

General characteristics

- Crew: one
- Capacity: one passenger
- Wingspan: 7.3 m (23 ft 11 in)
- Wing area: 14.5 m^{2} (156 sq ft)
- Empty weight: 240 kg (529 lb)
- Gross weight: 450 kg (992 lb)
- Fuel capacity: 100 litres (22 imp gal; 26 US gal) in two tanks

Performance

- Maximum speed: 188 km/h (117 mph, 102 kn)
- Cruise speed: 160 km/h (99 mph, 86 kn)
- Stall speed: 65 km/h (40 mph, 35 kn)
- Rate of climb: 10 m/s (2,000 ft/min)
