= AirLony Skylane =

Skylane
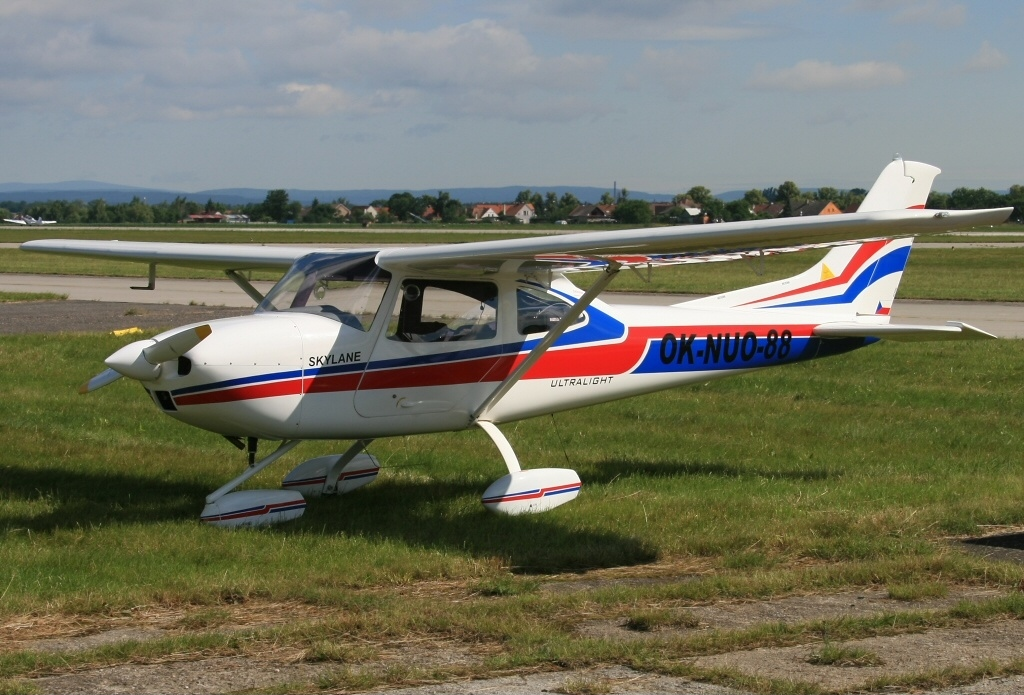

General information
- Type: Microlight cabin monoplane
- National origin: Czech Republic
- Manufacturer: AirLony

History
- First flight: 2005

The AirLony Skylane UL is a Czech two-seat, microlight, cabin monoplane manufactured by AirLony of Štětí.

The AirLony Skylane design was inspired by the much larger four-seat Cessna 182 Skylane, which it greatly resembles. The manufacturer calls it a "small Cessna".

== Design and development ==
The Skylane is a high-wing monoplane with a fixed nose-wheel landing gear and powered by a Rotax 912 piston engine. The enclosed cabin has side-by-side seating for two and dual yoke-style controls.

The aircraft is built from a combination of wood and composites. The fuselage is of composite construction, while the strut-braced wing is of wooden structure with a semi-laminar MS (1)-313 airfoil and features a D-cell. The wing is fabric-covered and has two integral 42 L (11 US gal) fuel tanks. The wooden structure, fabric-covered and electrically operated flaps cover 39% of the wing chord and can be lowered to fixed positions of 13°, 29° and 37°.

The tail fin is of wood construction and features a NACA 0012 symmetrical airfoil. The main landing gear legs are made from fibreglass laminates and mount wheels with hydraulically operated toe-brakes. The nose wheel is of a fully castering design and can rotate 360°, allowing the aircraft to be pushed backwards while ground handling.

The Skylane can use engines from 50 to 100 hp (37 to 75 kW) with engine weights of 50 to 100 kg (110 to 220 lb), including the Rotax 912ULS, Jabiru 2200 and Volkswagen air-cooled engines.

== Specifications ==
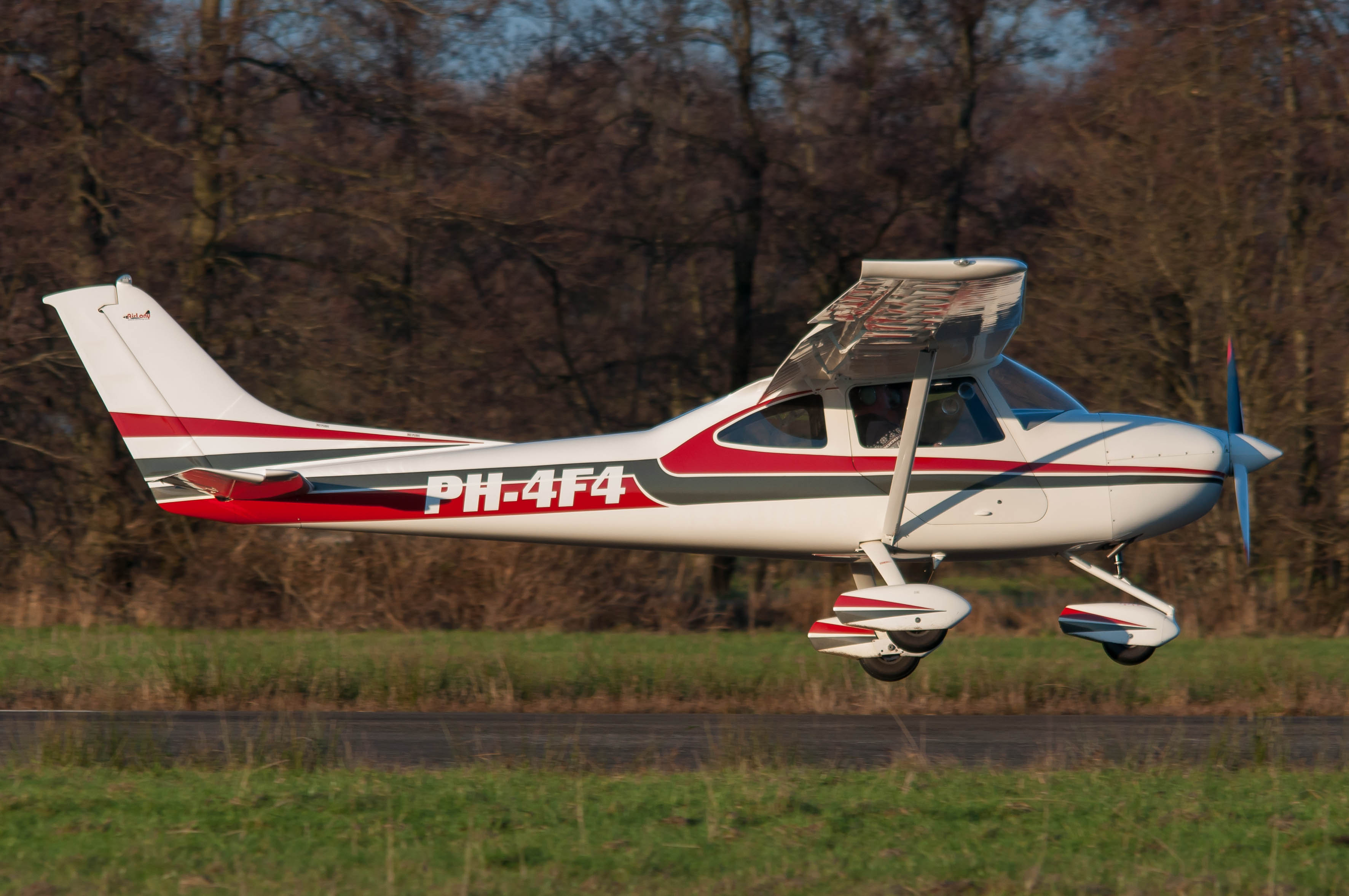
AirLony Skylane

Data from The World Directory of Leisure Aviation

General characteristics

- Crew: 2
- Wingspan: 8.95 m (29 ft 4 in)
- Wing area: 10.57 m^{2} (114 sq ft)
- Empty weight: 260 kg (573 lb)
- Gross weight: 450 kg (992 lb)
- Powerplant: 1 × Rotax 912 or similar , 37 to 75 kW (50 to 100 hp)

Performance

- Maximum speed: 207 km/h (129 mph, 112 kn)
- Rate of climb: 6.0 m/s (1,181 ft/min)
