= Třebestovice =

- Municipality
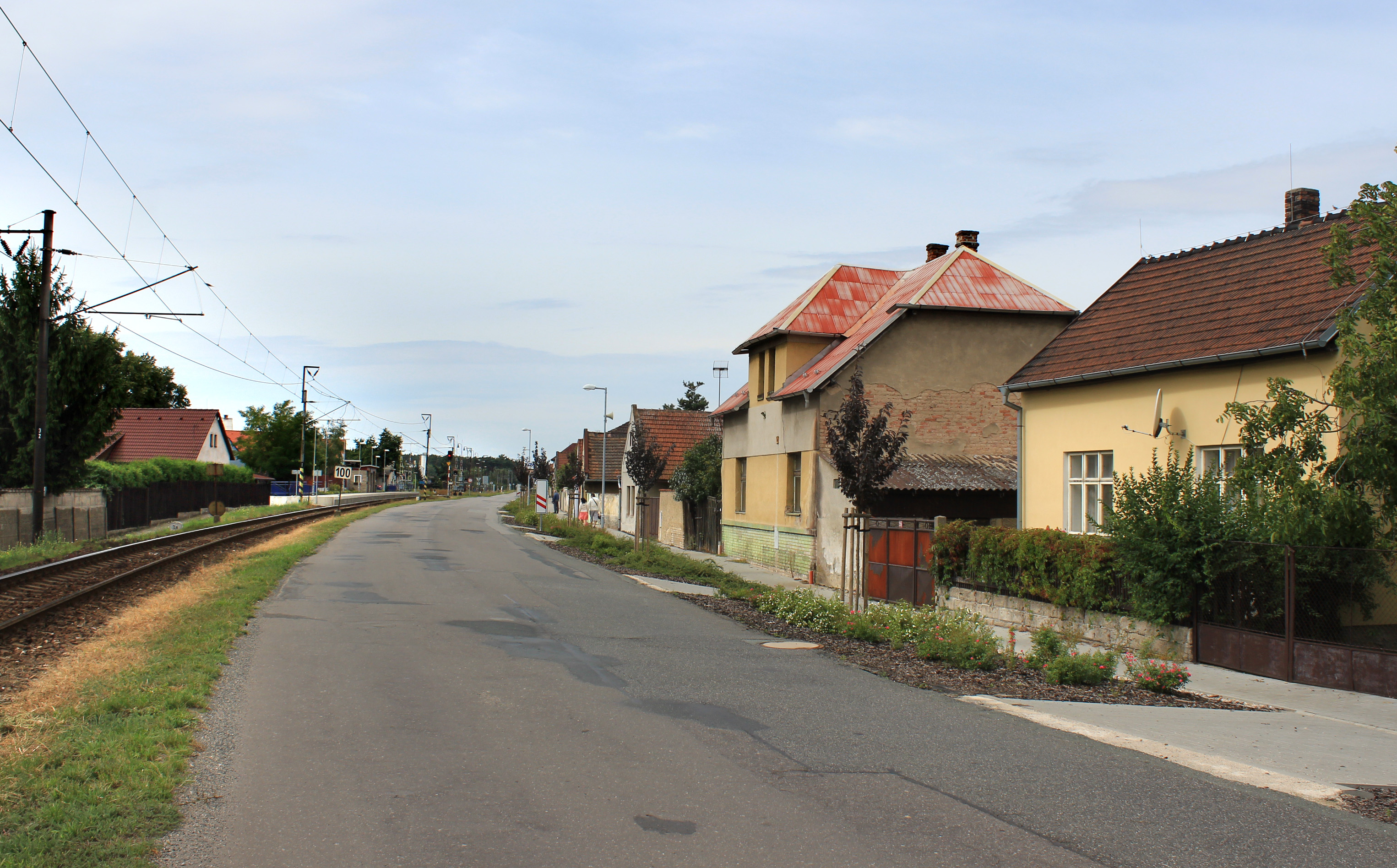
- Northern part of Třebestovice

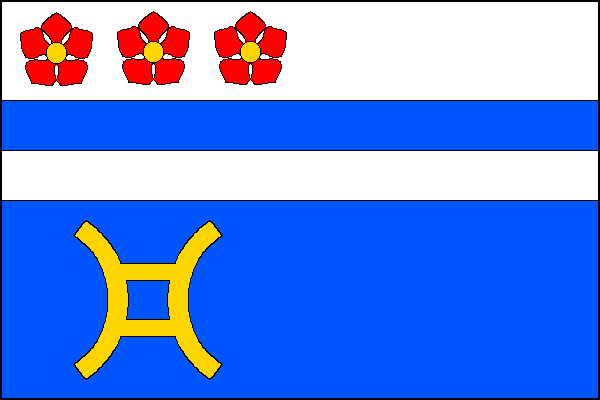
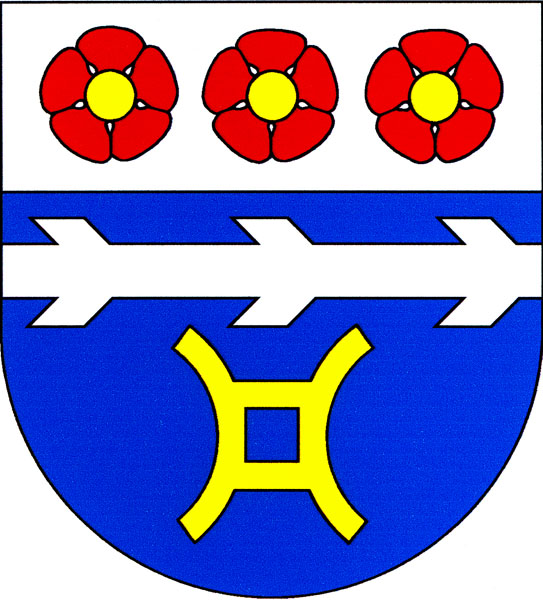
- Flag Coat of arms

- Location in the Czech Republic
- Coordinates: 50°7′29″N 14°57′30″E
- Country: Czech Republic
- Region: Central Bohemian
- District: Nymburk
- First mentioned: 993

Area
  - Total: 3.38 km^{2} (1.31 sq mi)
- Elevation: 196 m (643 ft)

Population (2026-01-01)
  - Total: 1,334
  - Density: 395/km^{2} (1,020/sq mi)
- Time zone: UTC+1 (CET)
  - Summer (DST): UTC+2 (CEST)
- Postal code: 289 12
- Website: www.obectrebestovice.cz

Třebestovice is a municipality and village in Nymburk District in the Central Bohemian Region of the Czech Republic. It has about 1,300 inhabitants.

== Geography ==
Třebestovice is located about 9 kilometres (6 mi) southwest of Nymburk and 29 km (18 mi) east of Prague. It lies in a flat landscape of the Central Elbe Table within the Polabí region. The Šembera River flows through the municipality.

== History ==
The first written mention of Třebestovice is from 993, when the village was donated by Duke Boleslaus II to the newly established Břevnov Monastery. The monastery owned Třebestovice until the Hussite Wars. Then it became part of the Přerov estate, which lasted until 1621, when the Přerov estate was joined to the Brandýs estate.

== Demographics ==
Historical population

Year	Pop.	±%
1869	320	—
1880	394	+23.1%
1890	396	+0.5%
1900	365	−7.8%
1910	421	+15.3%

Year	Pop.	±%
1921	431	+2.4%
1930	677	+57.1%
1950	738	+9.0%
1961	825	+11.8%
1970	777	−5.8%

Year	Pop.	±%
1980	848	+9.1%
1991	757	−10.7%
2001	789	+4.2%
2011	943	+19.5%
2021	1,136	+20.5%

Source: Censuses

== Transport ==
The D11 motorway (part of the European route E67) from Prague to Hradec Králové passes through the municipality.

Třebestovice is located on the short railway line Nymburk–Poříčany.

== Sights ==
There are no protected cultural monuments in the municipality.
