= NW Elektromobil =

Nesselsdorfer Wagenbau-Fabriks-Gesellschaft Elektromobil

Overview
- Manufacturer: Nesselsdorfer Wagenbau-Fabriks-Gesellschaft today Tatra, a.s.
- Production: 1900–1901
- Assembly: Nesselsdorf, Margraviate of Moravia, Cisleithania

Body and chassis
- Body style: Runabout four seater
- Layout: RR layout

Powertrain
- Engine: 2 electro motors EAG/2; 2 x 3 bhp (2.2 kW)
- Transmission: four-speed (plus reverse)

Dimensions
- Wheelbase: 2,075 mm (81.7 in)
- Length: 3,220 mm (126.8 in)
- Width: 1,296 mm (51.0 in)
- Height: 2,280 mm (89.8 in)
- Curb weight: 972 kg (2,143 lb)

The NW Elektromobil is an automobile from the veteran era manufactured by the Nesselsdorfer Wagenbau-Fabriks-Gesellschaft (NW), now Tatra, from 1900–1901. Only two cars, which were ordered by Emil Kolben's company, Elektrotechnická a. s., based in Vysočany, Prague, were produced. The two Elektromobils had factory numbers 77 and 83.
