= Kolbenova (Prague Metro) =

Prague metro station

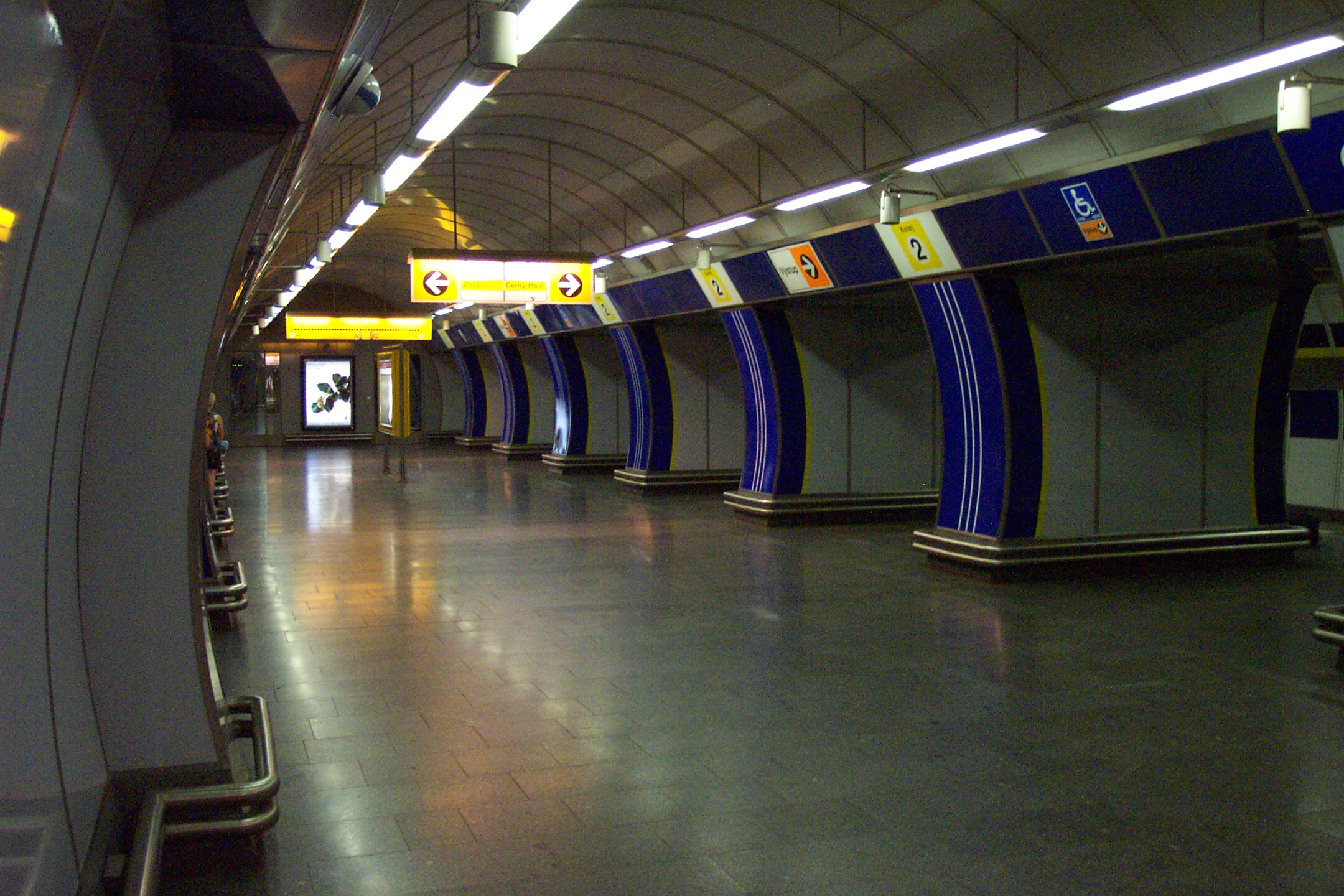

General information
- Location: Kolbenova street Vysočany, Prague 9 Prague; Czech Republic
- Coordinates: 50°06′37″N 14°31′00″E
- System: Prague Metro
- Platforms: 1 island platform
- Tracks: 2

Construction
- Structure type: Underground
- Depth: 26 m (85 ft)
- Accessible: Yes

Other information
- Fare zone: PID: Prague

History
- Opened: 8 June 2001; 25 years ago

Services
Preceding station	Prague Metro	Following station
Vysočanská toward Zličín	Line B	Hloubětín toward Černý Most
Location

Kolbenova (Czech pronunciation: [ˈkolbɛnova]) is a Prague Metro station on Line B. It was opened on 8 June 2001 as an addition to the previously opened section of Line B.

A more recent view of the station (2026)

== History ==
This station was once a ghost station from 1998 to 2001. The station was in a state of suspended construction as the heavy industry factories it should have served were closed after the Velvet Revolution. Trains slowed when passing through the dimly lit station. As the whole industrial area was slowly revitalised, the station was finally completed.

The station is located on a street named in honor of Emil Kolben, an engineer and entrepreneur from Bohemia who died in the Theresienstadt concentration camp.
