= Hloubětín tram depot =

- Vozovna Hloubětín
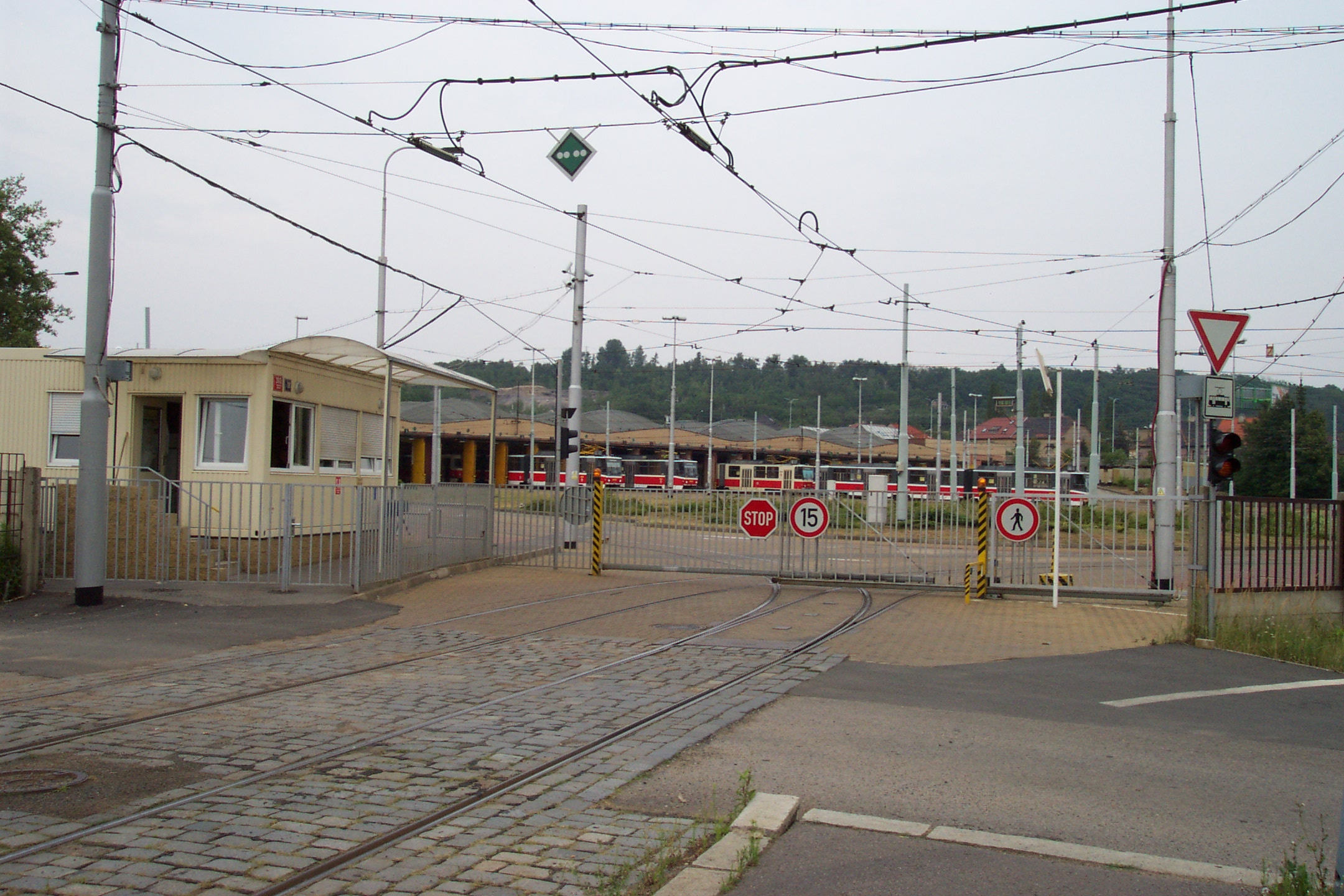
- the depot in 2006
- Interactive map of the Hloubětín tram depot area

General information
- Location: Prague 14, Czech Republic
- Coordinates: 50°6′31″N 14°31′46″E

Hloubětín tram depot (Czech: Vozovna Hloubětín) is a tram and trolleybus depot in Hloubětín that has been part of the Prague tram network since 1951. The depot celebrated fifty years of service in 2001.
