= Harry Pollak =

Mechanical engineer and economist

Harry Pollak, born Jindřich Pollak (24 February 1923 – 28 February 2014), was a Czech mechanical engineer and economist of Jewish origin. He left then-Czechoslovakia at 25 and spent most of his life in England, eventually becoming a financial consultant. He was part of the team that helped rescue British car maker Aston Martin from bankruptcy. He worked for IBM, Krupp, and Dunlop. The companies he financially saved also included a Swiss paper mill, a number of heavy manufacturers, and the largest European producer of printed circuit boards.

== Life ==
Harry Pollak was born on 24 February 1923 in Dvůr Semtín, Czechoslovakia. He was born as the only child to a family of landowners. He was able to escape the Holocaust only because his parents sent him to study at a lyceum in Nîmes in 1938. When he was 17, he joined the allied forces in France. He fought against the Nazis during World War II, and was one of the Czech soldiers who laid siege to the German-held city of Dunkirk in September 1944. He returned to Czechoslovakia with the Western Allies in May 1945.

After the war, he was proclaimed German, and a Nazi collaborator, and the authorities in Votice withheld his family farmland for three years. Before the Communist Coup in 1948, he was denied his master's degree from the Czech Technical University in Prague. Following the Communist Coup, his inherited property, which had been returned to him by a court decision, was permanently confiscated. In 1949, he and his wife Jarmila managed to escape over the Bohemian Forest into West Germany. Later, they continued on to Great Britain, where they received asylum and Harry finished his studies. They had a son named René Thomas.

In 2003, he received a PhD in Business Administration from the University of Economics in Prague. In 2016, the Centre for Restructuring and Insolvency at the University of Economics was named after Pollak, acknowledging his achievements in restructuring businesses.

For most of his career, Pollak worked as a crisis manager in various countries. Apart from the UK, he was employed in Germany, Italy, and the United States, and he finally settled in Netstal in Switzerland, where he died on 28 February 2014 at the age of 91. He is buried in Votice near his birthplace.

== Published texts ==
In the 2000s three books were published in the Czech Republic:

- Jak obnovit životaschopnost upadajících podniků, ISBN 80-7179-803-7 (How To Rescue Bankrupting Companies)
- Jak odstranit neopodstatněné náklady: hodnotová analýza v praxi, ISBN 80-247-1047-1 (Eliminating Unjustified Costs: Value Analysis in Practice)
- Můj život: Harry Pollak – muž, který zachránil značku Aston Martin, ISBN 978-80-204-2303-0 (My Life: Harry Pollak – the Man Who Rescued Aston Martin).

=== Interviews with Harry Pollak ===
- Němci byli nepřátelé, zrada Čechů mě bolí víc, říká židovský emigrant Harry Pollak, 18. 11. 2010, xman.cz (in Czech)
- Harry Pollak: Muž, který zachránil Aston Martin, 15. 1. 2011, Czech Radio, Radio Prague (in Czech)
- Harry Pollak: Od nucené emigrace až po doktora Ph.D., 12. 6. 2012, University of Economics in Prague (in Czech)
- Harry Pollak, recorded in 2013 and edited in January 2014 by Luděk Jirka, Paměť národa (in Czech)
- Harry Pollak: Můj život, 17. 6. 2015, Czech Radio, Vltava (in Czech)
