= Hloubětín (Prague Metro) =

Prague metro station

Coordinates: 50°6′22″N 14°32′17″E

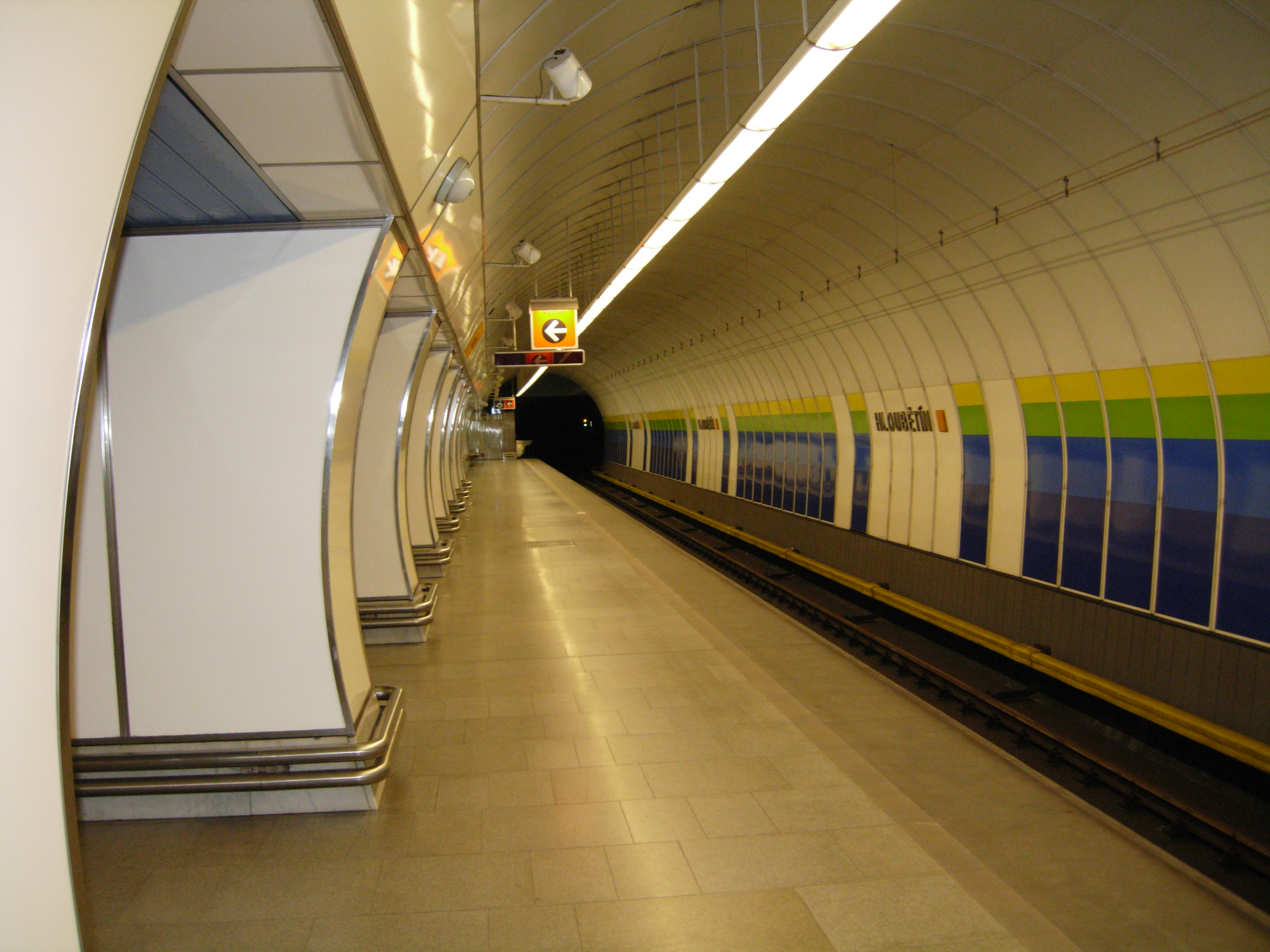

General information
- Location: Poděbradská street Hloubětín, Prague 14; Prague; Czech Republic
- System: Prague Metro
- Platforms: 1 island platform
- Tracks: 2

Construction
- Structure type: Underground
- Depth: 24 m (79 ft)
- Accessible: Yes

Other information
- Fare zone: PID: Prague

History
- Opened: 15 October 1999; 26 years ago

Services
Preceding station	Prague Metro	Following station
Kolbenova toward Zličín	Line B	Rajská zahrada toward Černý Most
Location

Hloubětín (Czech pronunciation: [ˈɦloubjɛciːn]) is a Prague Metro station on Line B, located in the eponymous district. It was opened on 15 October 1999 as an addition to the previously opened section of Line B.

== History ==
This station was once a ghost station from 1998 to 1999. The station were in a state of suspended construction as the heavy industry factories it should have served were closed after the Velvet Revolution. Trains slowed when passing through the dimly lit station. As the whole industrial area was slowly revitalized, the station was finally completed.
