= Emil Kolben =

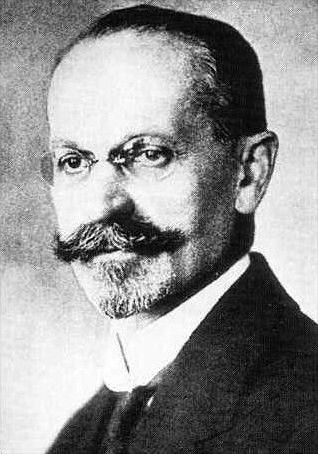
Emil Kolben

Emil Kolben (1 November 1862 – 3 July 1943) was a Czech engineer and entrepreneur. The large engineering company ČKD bears his name. He died in the Theresienstadt concentration camp.

== Biography ==
Kolben was born on 1 November 1862 in Strančice, Bohemia, Austrian Empire. He was born into the German-speaking Jewish family of a small shopkeeper. He had nine siblings and from the age of 15 he was left to care for himself. After completing his secondary education in Prague, Kolben studied there at the German Technical University. After finishing university he obtained a two-year Gerstner's stipend that allowed him to study abroad. In 1887 he travelled to Zurich, Paris and London and in April 1888 he sailed with his wife Malvinus to the United States, where he stayed for five years. After arriving in New York he set off on further study trips traveling across the country. He obtained a position as an engineer at the Edison Machine Works in Schenectady, then as an assistant of Thomas Edison in Orange, New Jersey and finally as the chief-engineer in Edison's laboratories. In 1889 he visited the laboratory of Nikola Tesla to learn about the poly-phase alternating current motors and power system the inventor was developing there.

In 1892 Kolben returned to Europe and for two years worked as the chief-designer in Switzerland for company Oerlikon which manufactured poly-phase alternating current generators. In 1896 he returned to Bohemia and, in the same year, set up a company named "Kolben a spol." in Vysočany, an industrial district of Prague. A 60 kW alternator was the first system constructed. With secured financial investment from a bank the company became a stock holding company in 1898. In 1899 it was renamed to "Elektrotechnická a. s.". In 1911 Kolben invited Edison to visit Prague.

The company produced large electrotechnical systems such as hydro-electric power stations, locomotives and machines. Used technologies and equipment were much above standards of the time – for example instead of using a centralized power source and mechanical transmitters the machines were fitted with electrical engines.

In 1921 the company merged with another engineering company "Českomoravská strojírna" into "Českomoravská-Kolben a. s.". In 1927 it merged with "A. s. strojírny" (formerly "Breitfeld & Daněk") into "Českomoravská-Kolben-Daněk", the ČKD. Kolben had served as the director until 1939. The company produced a wide array of electrotechnic and engineering systems and also complete industrial plants. ČKD employed up to 15,000 people.

Kolben also founded two other companies: "Pražská továrna na káble" in Prague-Hostivař (power cables) and "Pražská elektroinstalační společnost" in Prague-Hloubětín (wiring systems). He published dozens of articles, mostly about electrotechnic and engineering.

Immediately after the occupation of Czechoslovakia by Nazi-Germany (1939) Kolben was recalled from his position as the director (16 March) and later imprisoned in the Theresienstadt concentration camp. He died there abandoned and exhausted. Almost all members of his family were imprisoned; 26 of them were killed by the Germans. His grandson Jindřich (born 1926) survived.

ČKD was heavily damaged during the last days of World War II. It later employed up to 50,000 people and was known mainly for locomotives and trams. Mismanagement during the new free-market era (1990s) and technological delay accumulated during previous decades resulted in bankruptcy in 1998 and a massive reduction in production.

== Legacy and honours ==
A notable street in Prague that connects the districts of Vysočany and Hloubětín is named Kolbenova after Emil Kolben. The nearby Prague Metro station is named Kolbenova after the street.
