= Rudná (Prague-West District) =

- Town
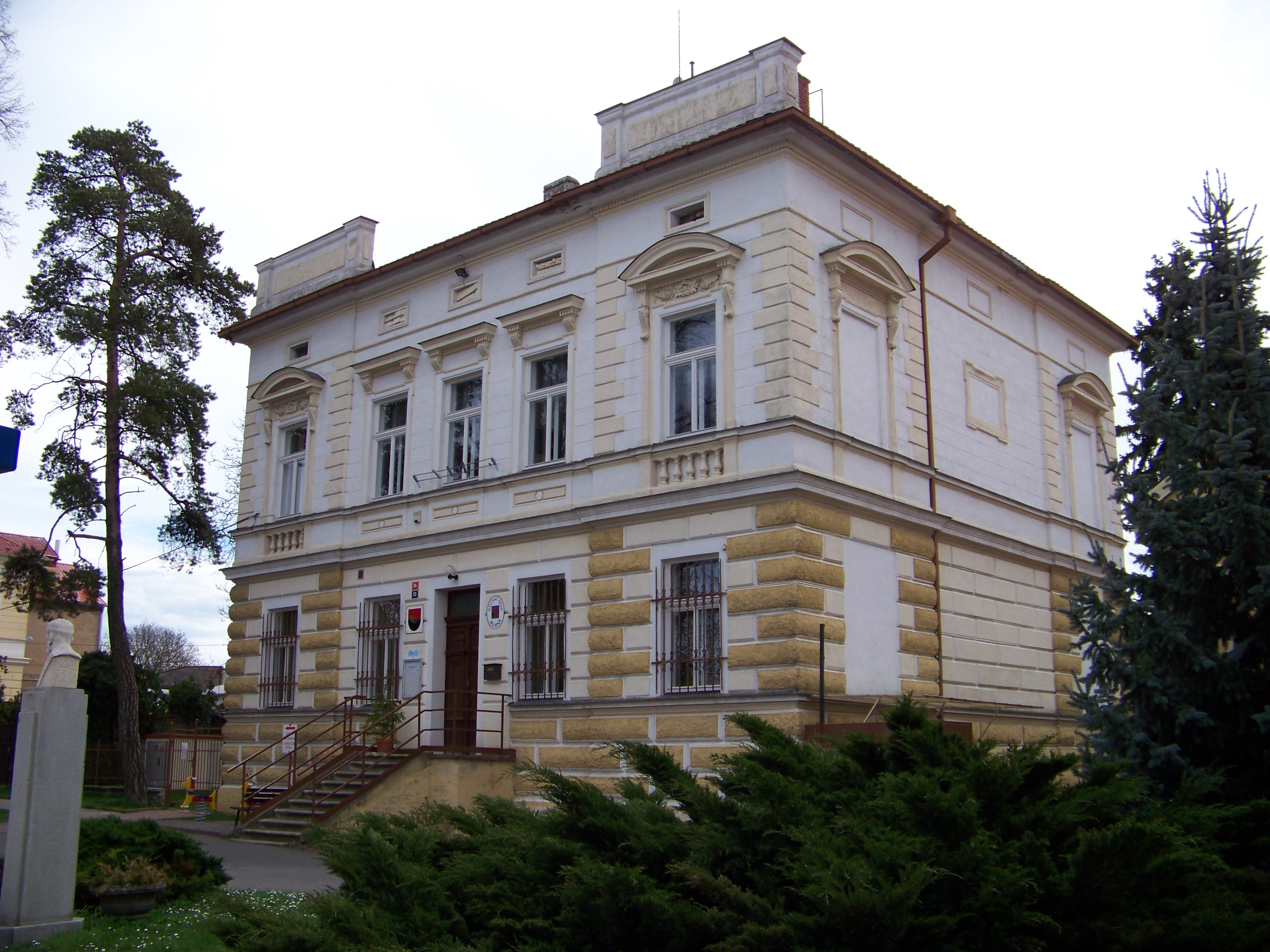
- Town hall

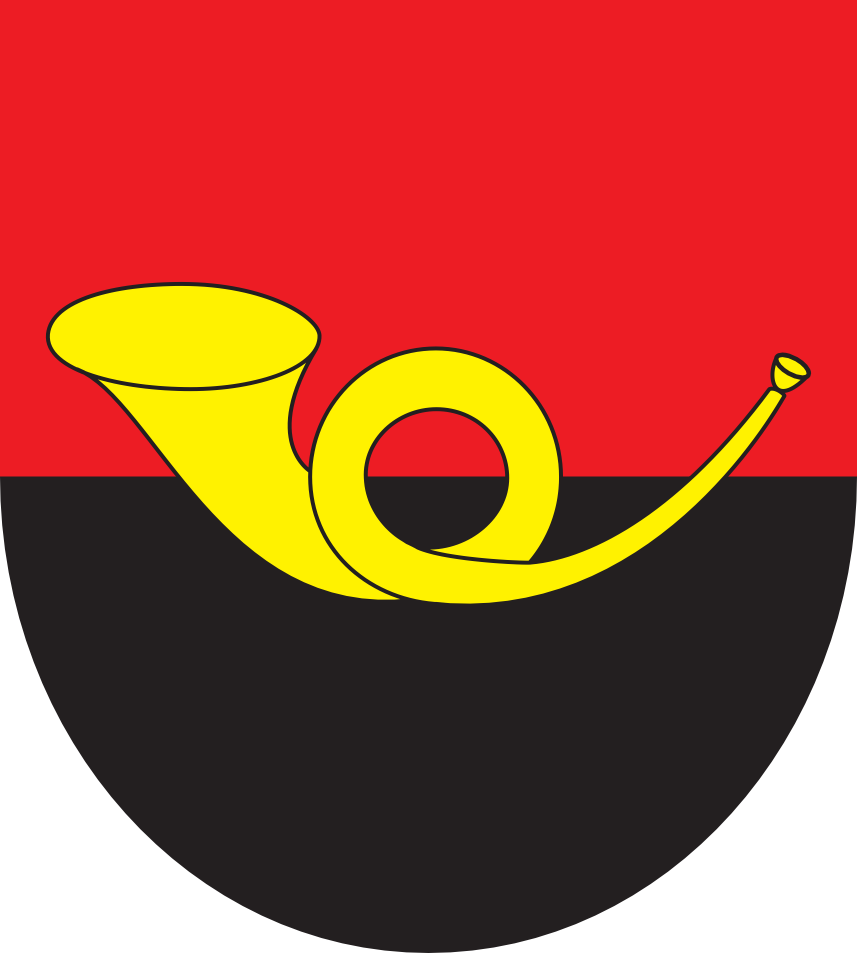
- Flag Coat of arms

- Location in the Czech Republic
- Coordinates: 50°2′6″N 14°14′4″E
- Country: Czech Republic
- Region: Central Bohemian
- District: Prague-West
- First mentioned: 1951

Government
  - Mayor: Lubomír Kocman

Area
  - Total: 8.20 km^{2} (3.17 sq mi)
- Elevation: 378 m (1,240 ft)

Population (2026-01-01)
  - Total: 5,560
  - Density: 678/km^{2} (1,760/sq mi)
- Time zone: UTC+1 (CET)
  - Summer (DST): UTC+2 (CEST)
- Postal code: 252 19
- Website: www.rudnamesto.cz

Rudná (Czech pronunciation: [ˈrudnaː]) is a town in Prague-West District in the Central Bohemian Region of the Czech Republic. It has about 5,600 inhabitants. The town is located on the stream Radotínský potok in the Prague Plateau. Rudná was established in 1951 by merger of the municipalities of Dušníky and Hořelice and became a town in 2000.

== Etymology ==
After the municipality was established in 1951, it got its name derived from the Czech word ruda (i.e. 'ore'), which commemorates a long history of iron ore mining in the region. The name was invented by children at a local school, as many of their parents and grandparents worked in the local iron ore mines.

== Geography ==
Rudná is located about 6 kilometres (4 mi) west of Prague. It lies in a flat agricultural landscape in the Prague Plateau. The highest point is at 410 m (1,345 ft) above sea level. The stream Radotínský potok flows through the town.

== History ==
Two villages, Hořelice and Dušníky, were originally located in the area of today's Rudná. The first written mention of Hořelice was in 1052. Dušníky was first mentioned in 1228, when both villages were property of St. George's Convent in Prague. While Hořelice was owned by various lower nobles from the 15th century, Dušníky was mainly church property and for the longest time it was owned by the Metropolitan Chapter at Saint Vitus in Prague.

In the 1860s, mining of iron ore began in the area. In 1936, both Dušníky and Hořelice were promoted to market towns. They continued to develop and they gradually created one urban unit. In 1951, Dušníky and Hořelice merged into a new municipality under the newly created name Rudná. Rudná was promoted to a town in 2000.

== Demographics ==
Historical population

Year	Pop.	±%
1869	1,014	—
1880	1,175	+15.9%
1890	1,497	+27.4%
1900	2,177	+45.4%
1910	2,904	+33.4%

Year	Pop.	±%
1921	2,837	−2.3%
1930	3,129	+10.3%
1950	3,153	+0.8%
1961	3,321	+5.3%
1970	3,090	−7.0%

Year	Pop.	±%
1980	2,974	−3.8%
1991	2,838	−4.6%
2001	3,075	+8.4%
2011	4,882	+58.8%
2021	5,158	+5.7%

Source: Censuses

== Transport ==
Rudná is located along an old second-class road from Prague to Beroun and Plzeň. Nowadays the parallel D5 motorway runs just north of the town.

Rudná is located on the railway line Prague–Beroun. The town is served by two train stations called Rudná u Prahy and Rudná zastávka.

== Sights ==
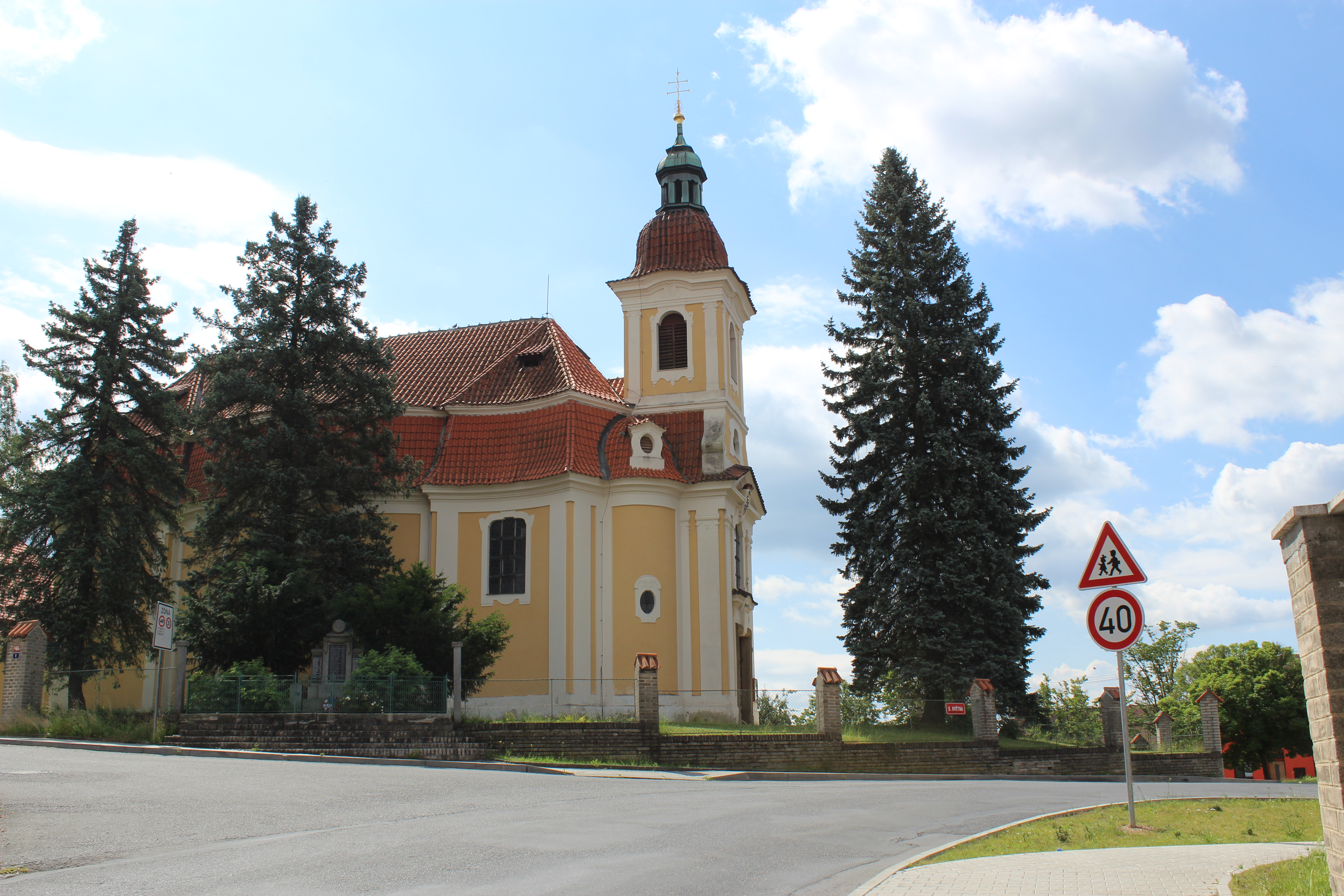
Church of the Beheading of Saint John the Baptist

The Church of the Beheading of Saint John the Baptist is a valuable Baroque church, probably built according to the plans of Kilian Ignaz Dientzenhofer.

The Church of Saint George is a neo-Gothic church from the beginning of the 20th century. It replaced an old dilapidated Baroque church.

The Hořelice Castle belongs to the main landmarks of Rudná. Today this Baroque castle is privately owned and inaccessible.

== Notable people ==
- Radek Šírl (born 1981), footballer
