= Kařez =

- Municipality
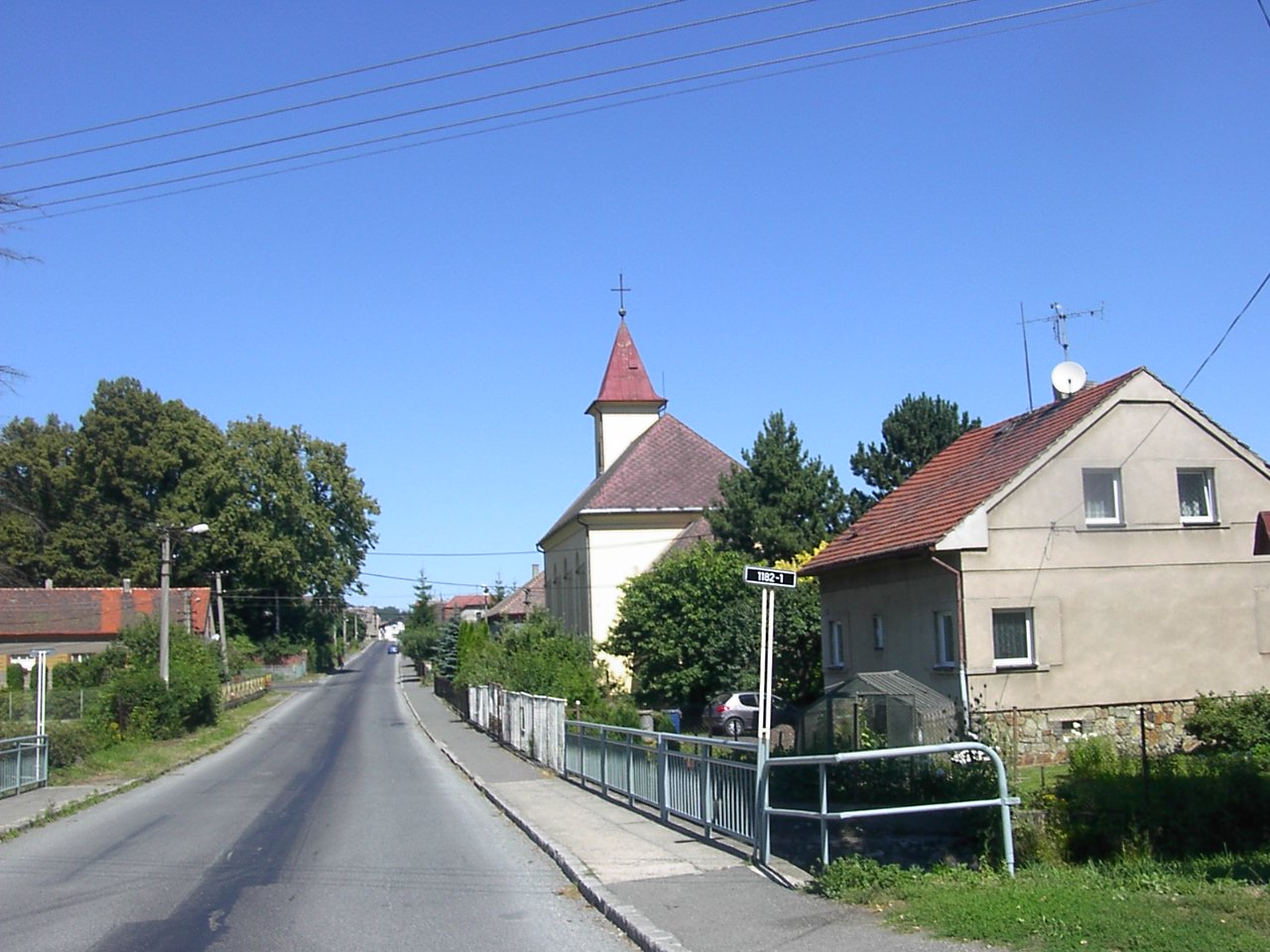
- Church of Saint John of Nepomuk

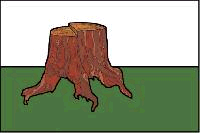
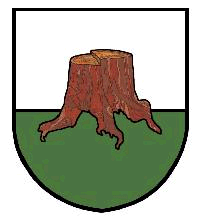
- Flag Coat of arms

- Location in the Czech Republic
- Coordinates: 49°49′28″N 13°46′54″E
- Country: Czech Republic
- Region: Plzeň
- District: Rokycany
- First mentioned: 1281

Area
  - Total: 5.87 km^{2} (2.27 sq mi)
- Elevation: 452 m (1,483 ft)

Population (2026-01-01)
  - Total: 746
  - Density: 127/km^{2} (329/sq mi)
- Time zone: UTC+1 (CET)
  - Summer (DST): UTC+2 (CEST)
- Postal code: 338 08
- Website: www.obeckarez.cz

Kařez is a municipality and village in Rokycany District in the Plzeň Region of the Czech Republic. It has about 700 inhabitants.

Kařez lies approximately 17 kilometres (11 mi) north-east of Rokycany, 31 km (19 mi) east of Plzeň, and 55 km (34 mi) south-west of Prague.

== Demographics ==
Historical population
Year	Pop.	±%
1869	313	—
1880	510	+62.9%
1890	584	+14.5%
1900	521	−10.8%
1910	512	−1.7%
1921	780	+52.3%
1930	720	−7.7%
1950	642	−10.8%
1961	694	+8.1%
1970	627	−9.7%
1980	618	−1.4%
1991	544	−12.0%
2001	541	−0.6%
2011	591	+9.2%
2021	708	+19.8%
Source: Censuses

== Transport ==
Kařez is located on the railway lines Prague–Klatovy and Plzeň–Beroun.
