= Olbramovice (Benešov District) =

- Municipality
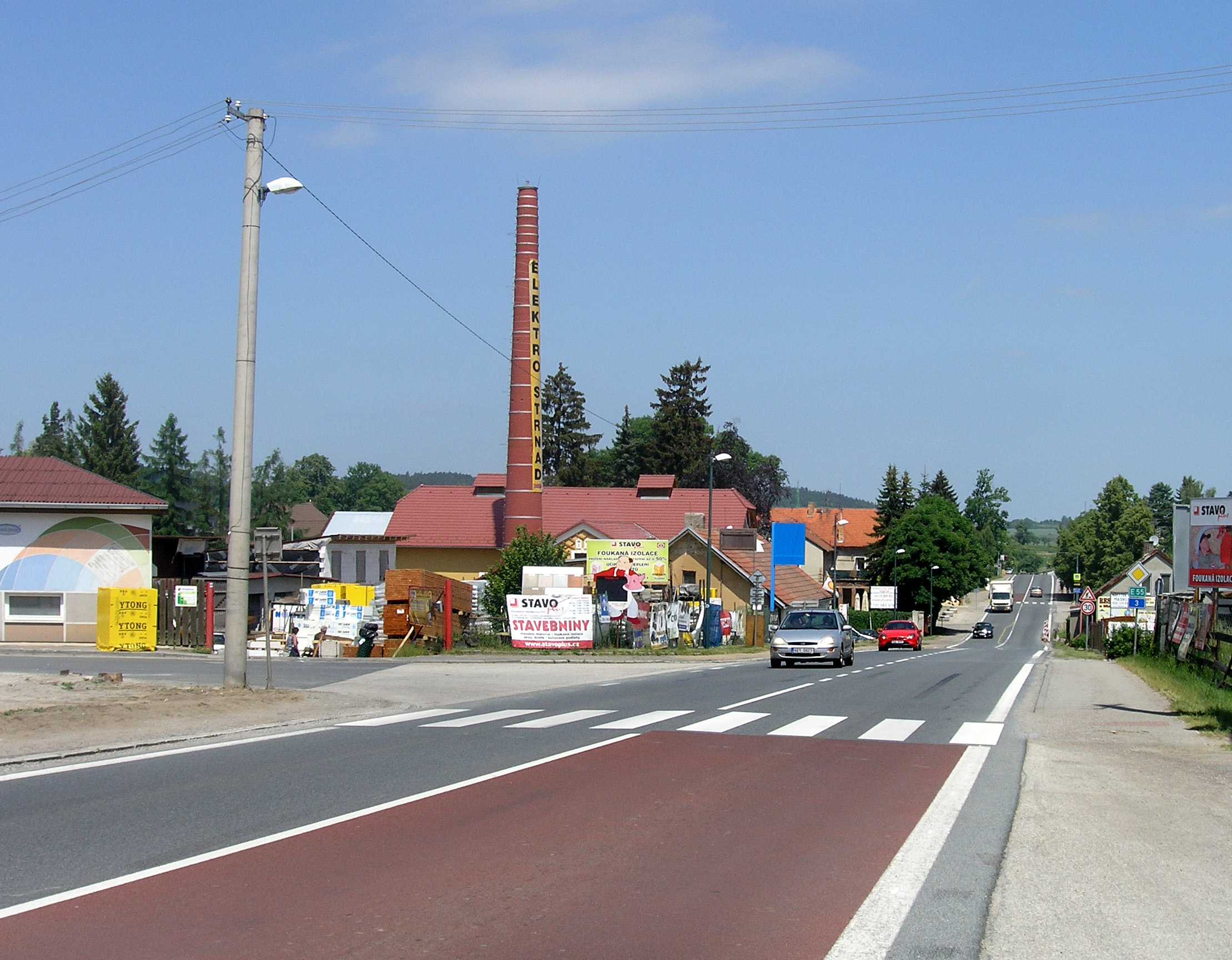
- Main road

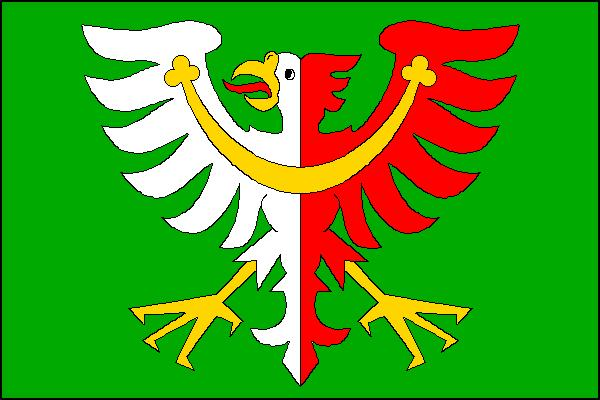
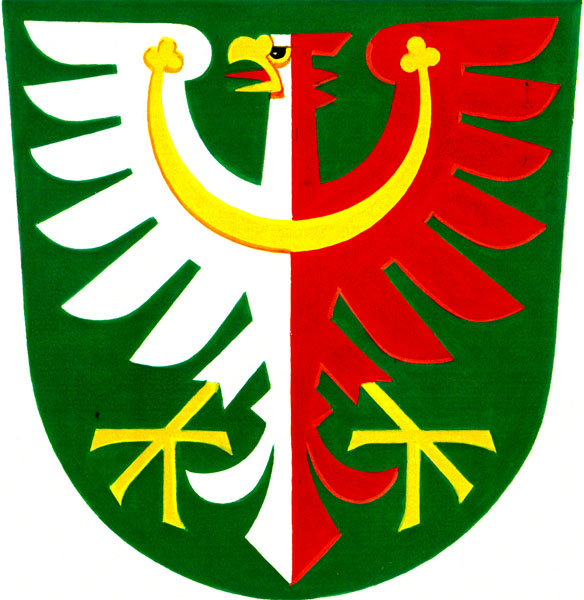
- Flag Coat of arms

- Location in the Czech Republic
- Coordinates: 49°40′2″N 14°38′22″E
- Country: Czech Republic
- Region: Central Bohemian
- District: Benešov
- First mentioned: 1352

Area
  - Total: 25.37 km^{2} (9.80 sq mi)
- Elevation: 418 m (1,371 ft)

Population (2026-01-01)
  - Total: 1,437
  - Density: 56.64/km^{2} (146.7/sq mi)
- Time zone: UTC+1 (CET)
  - Summer (DST): UTC+2 (CEST)
- Postal codes: 257 53, 259 01
- Website: www.olbramovice.cz

Olbramovice is a municipality and village in Benešov District in the Central Bohemian Region of the Czech Republic. It has about 1,400 inhabitants.

== Administrative division ==
Olbramovice consists of 15 municipal parts (in brackets population according to the 2021 census):

- Olbramovice Městečko (60)
- Olbramovice Ves (756)
- Babice (0)
- Dvůr Semtín (2)
- Kochnov (9)
- Křešice (107)
- Mokřany (6)
- Podolí (5)
- Radotín (11)
- Semtín (27)
- Semtínek (13)
- Slavkov (41)
- Tomice II (162)
- Veselka (120)
- Zahradnice (47)

== Etymology ==
The name Olbramovice is derived from the personal name Olbram, meaning "the village of Olbram's people".

== Geography ==
Olbramovice is located about 13 kilometres (8 mi) south of Benešov. It lies on the border of the Benešov Uplands and Vlašim Uplands. The highest point is at 620 m (2,030 ft) above sea level. The municipal territory is rich in minor streams and fishponds.

The largest and most significant pond is Podhrázský rybník. Together with its surroundings it is protected as a nature reserve. It is an important ornithological site.

== History ==
The first written mention of Olbramovice is from 1352.

== Demographics ==
Historical population

Year	Pop.	±%
1869	1,973	—
1880	1,788	−9.4%
1890	1,710	−4.4%
1900	1,624	−5.0%
1910	1,645	+1.3%

Year	Pop.	±%
1921	1,712	+4.1%
1930	1,684	−1.6%
1950	1,278	−24.1%
1961	1,381	+8.1%
1970	1,268	−8.2%

Year	Pop.	±%
1980	1,185	−6.5%
1991	1,126	−5.0%
2001	1,105	−1.9%
2011	1,189	+7.6%
2021	1,366	+14.9%

Source: Censuses

== Transport ==
The I/3 road (part of the European route E55), which replaces the unfinished section of the D3 motorway from Prague to Tábor, passes through the municipality.

Olbramovice is located on the important railway line Prague–Tábor, which further continues to České Budějovice or to České Velenice and Vienna.

== Sights ==
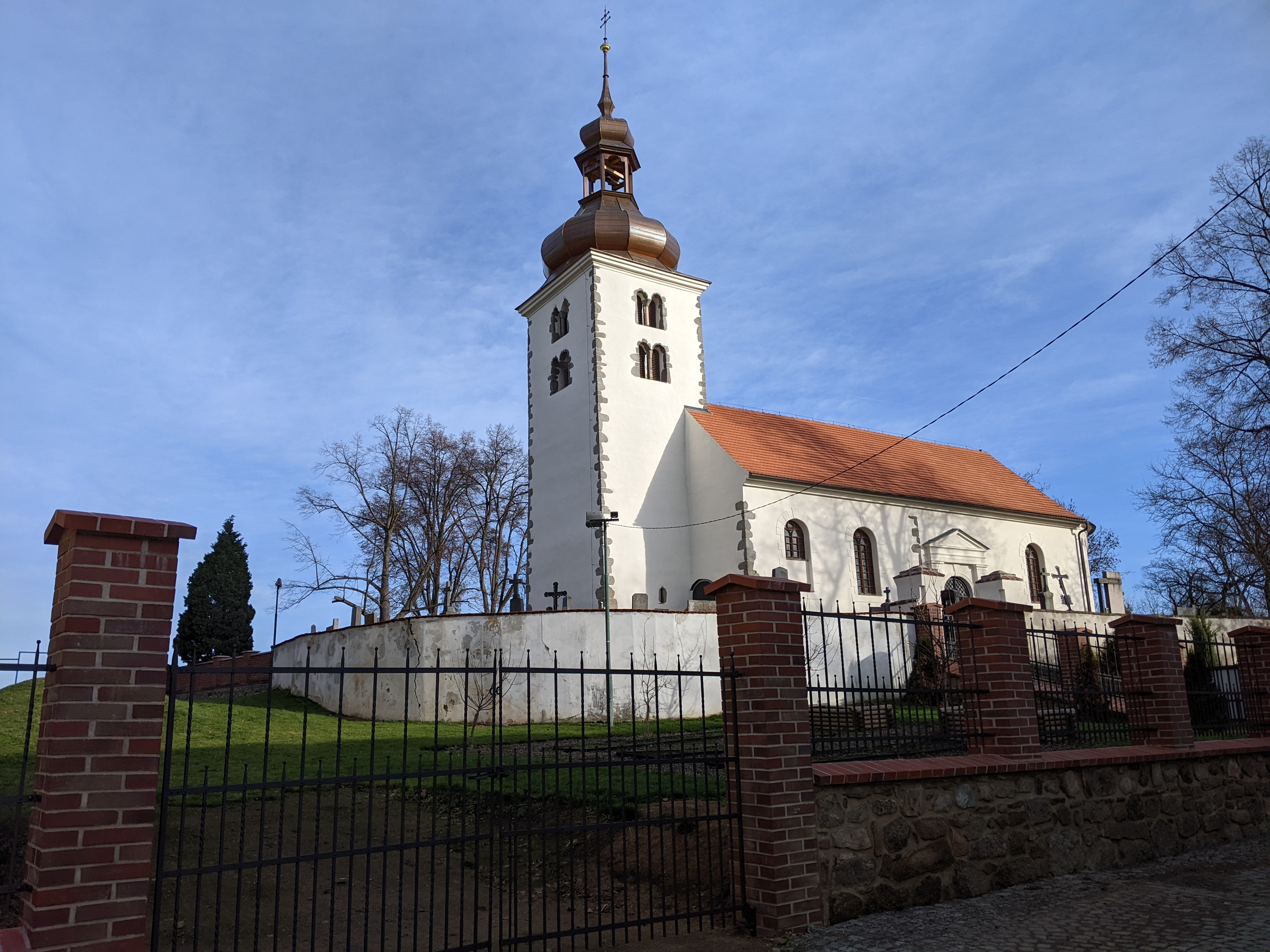
Church of All Saints

The main landmark of Olbramovice is the Church of All Saints. It has Romanesque origins from the 12th century. In 1866, it was rebuilt in the neo-Romanesque style.

== Notable people ==
- Harry Pollak (1923–2014), mechanical engineer and economist
