= Strančice =

- Municipality
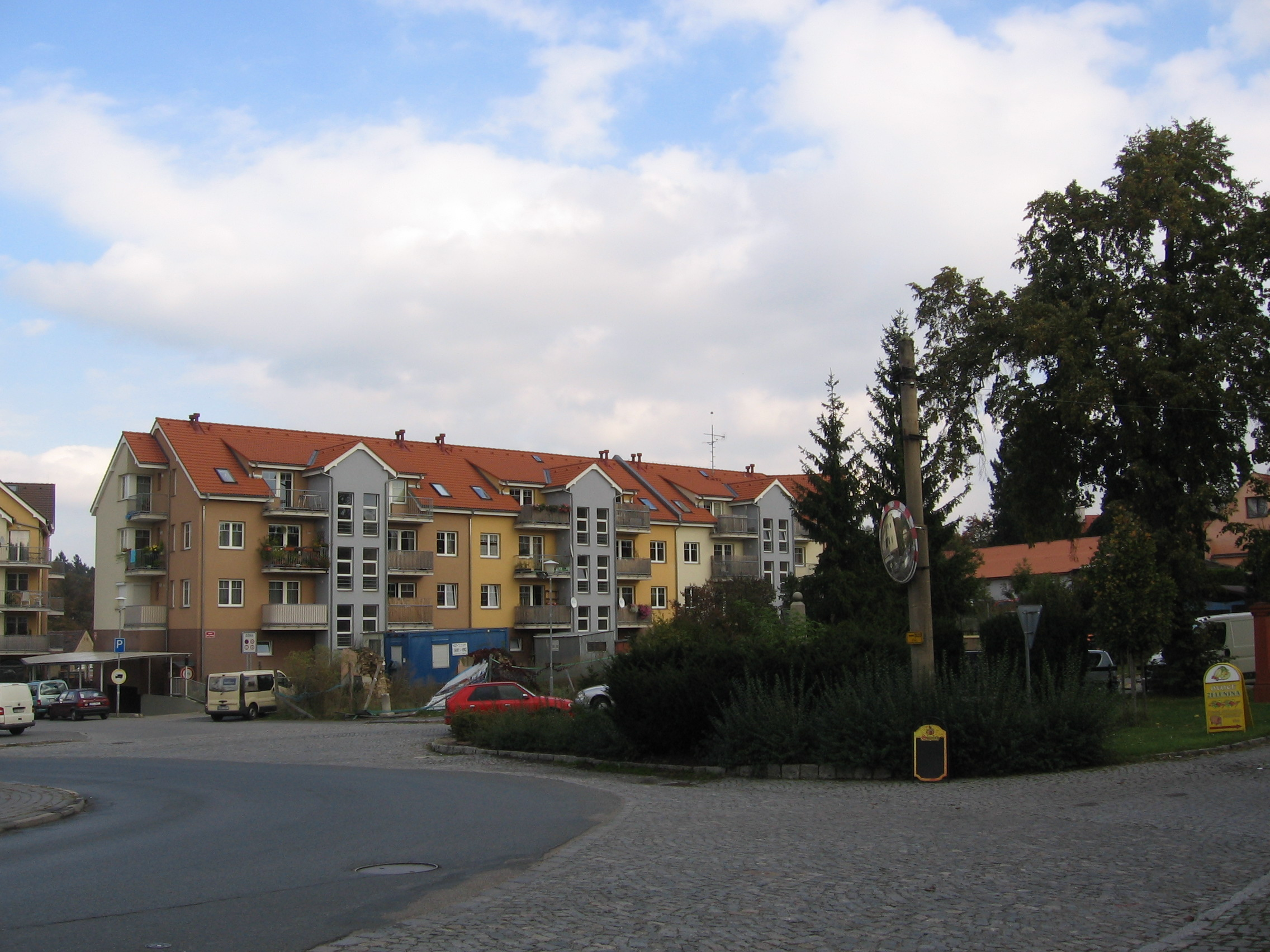
- Centre of Strančice

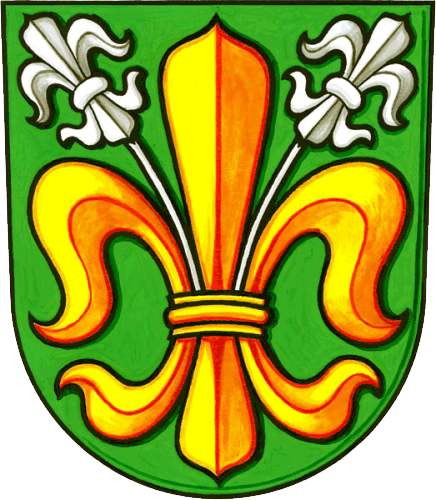
- Flag Coat of arms

- Location in the Czech Republic
- Coordinates: 49°56′53″N 14°40′39″E
- Country: Czech Republic
- Region: Central Bohemian
- District: Prague-East
- First mentioned: 1404

Area
  - Total: 11.60 km^{2} (4.48 sq mi)
- Elevation: 415 m (1,362 ft)

Population (2026-01-01)
  - Total: 2,990
  - Density: 258/km^{2} (668/sq mi)
- Time zone: UTC+1 (CET)
  - Summer (DST): UTC+2 (CEST)
- Postal code: 251 63
- Website: www.strancice.cz

Strančice is a municipality and village in Prague-East District in the Central Bohemian Region of the Czech Republic. It has about 3,000 inhabitants.

== Administrative division ==
Strančice consists of seven municipal parts (in brackets population according to the 2021 census):

- Strančice (2,053)
- Kašovice (83)
- Otice (96)
- Předboř (114)
- Sklenka (25)
- Svojšovice (138)
- Všechromy (209)

== Etymology ==
The name is derived from the surname Stránka, meaning "the village of Stránka's people".

== Geography ==
Strančice is located about 15 kilometres (9 mi) southeast of Prague. It lies in the Benešov Uplands. The highest point is at 492 m (1,614 ft) above sea level.

== History ==
The first written mention of Strančice is from 1404. The main impetus for the development of the village was the construction of the railway in 1871.

== Demographics ==
Historical population

Year	Pop.	±%
1869	994	—
1880	941	−5.3%
1890	896	−4.8%
1900	897	+0.1%
1910	935	+4.2%

Year	Pop.	±%
1921	1,074	+14.9%
1930	1,893	+76.3%
1950	1,758	−7.1%
1961	1,798	+2.3%
1970	1,609	−10.5%

Year	Pop.	±%
1980	1,532	−4.8%
1991	1,428	−6.8%
2001	1,443	+1.1%
2011	2,101	+45.6%
2021	2,718	+29.4%

Source: Censuses

== Transport ==
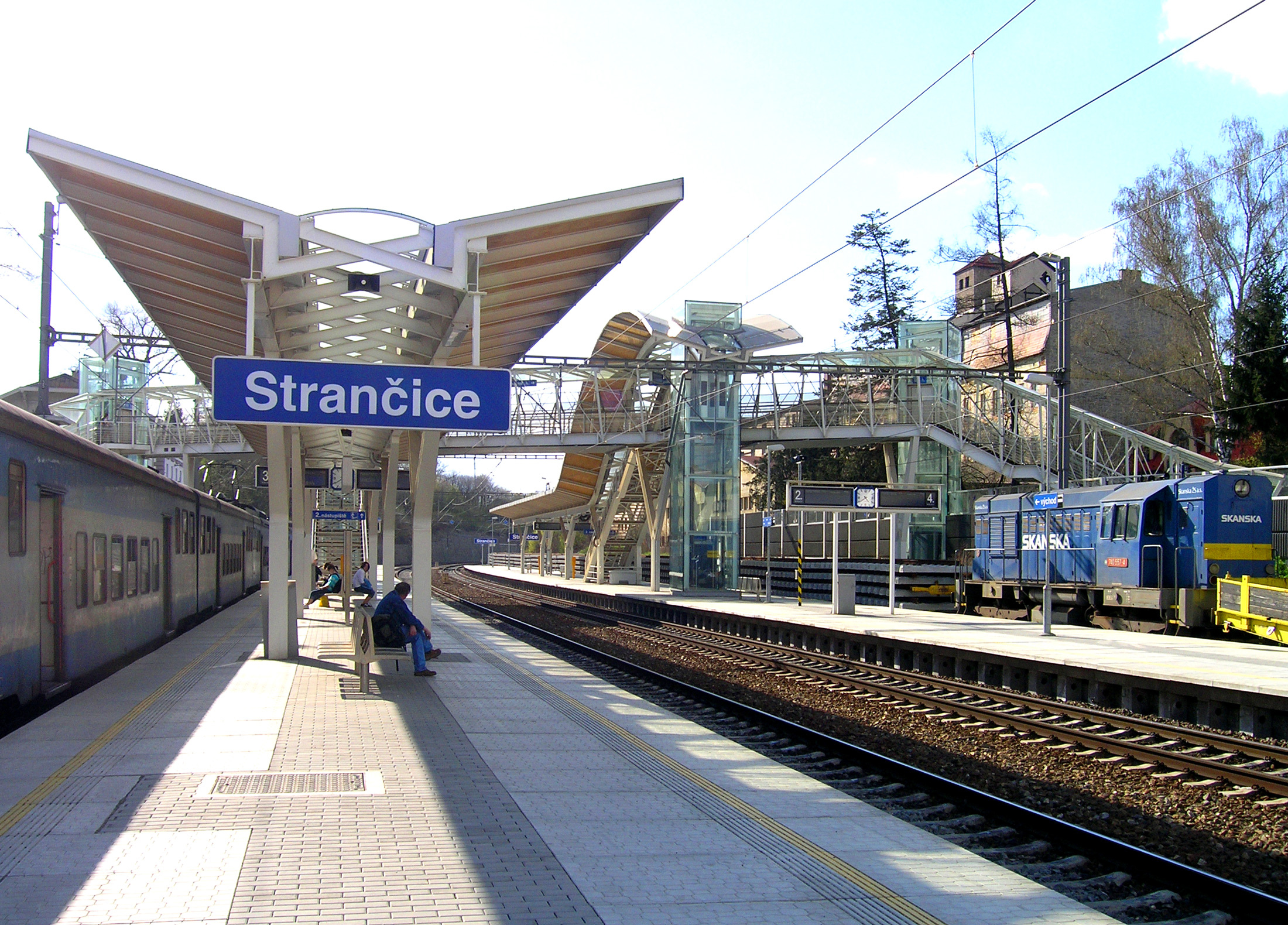
Train station

The D1 motorway from Prague to Brno runs through the municipality.

Strančice is located on the railway line Prague–Benešov.

== Sights ==
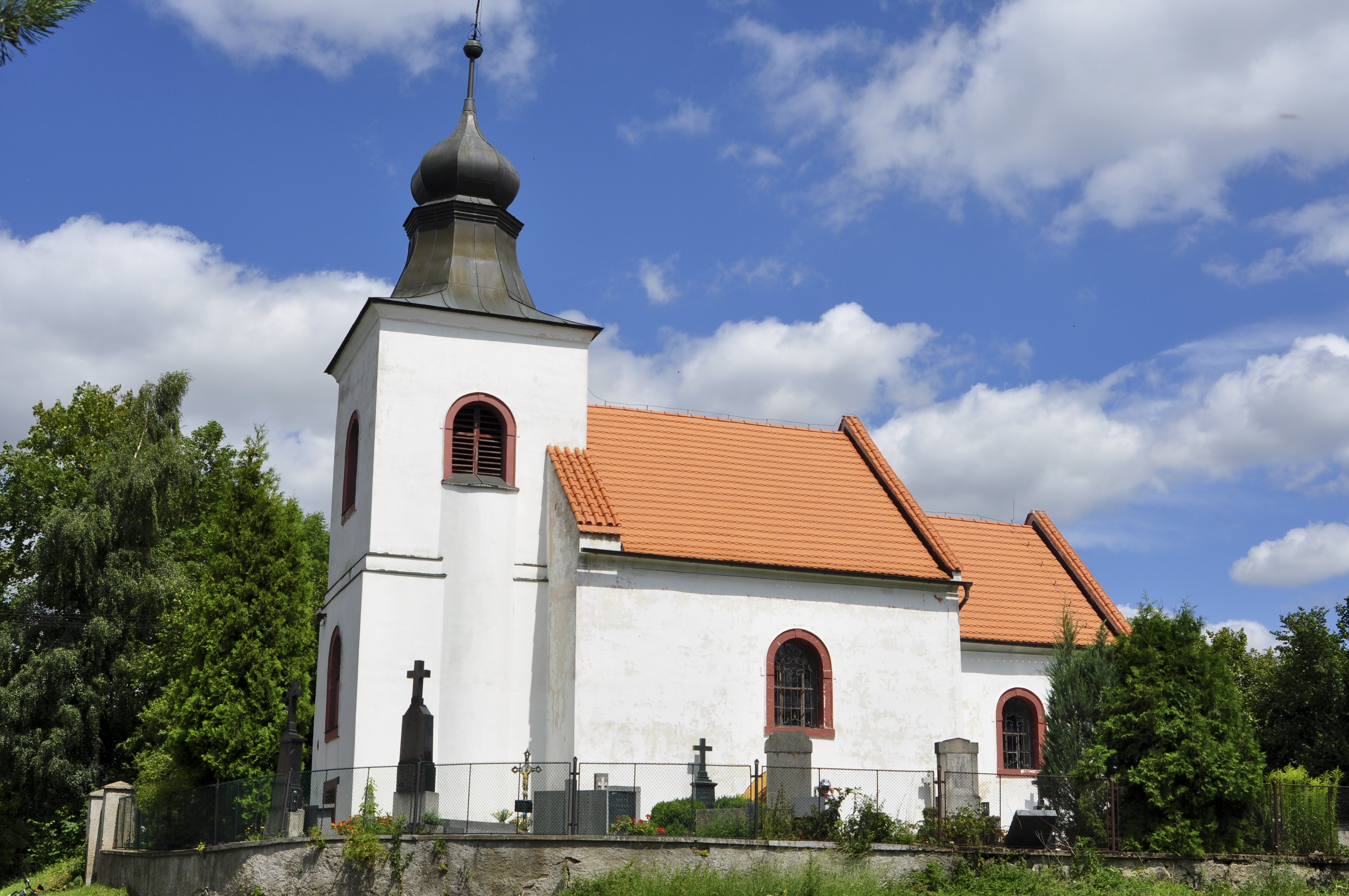
Church of Saint Nicholas in Otice

A valuable pair of buildings are the former synagogue and rabbi's house, which date from 1849.

The Church of Saint Nicholas in located in Otice. It is originally a Gothic church, rebuilt in the Baroque style.

== Notable people ==
- Emil Kolben (1862–1943), engineer and entrepreneur
