= Hloubětín =

District of Prague in the Czech Republic

- Cadastral Area of Prague
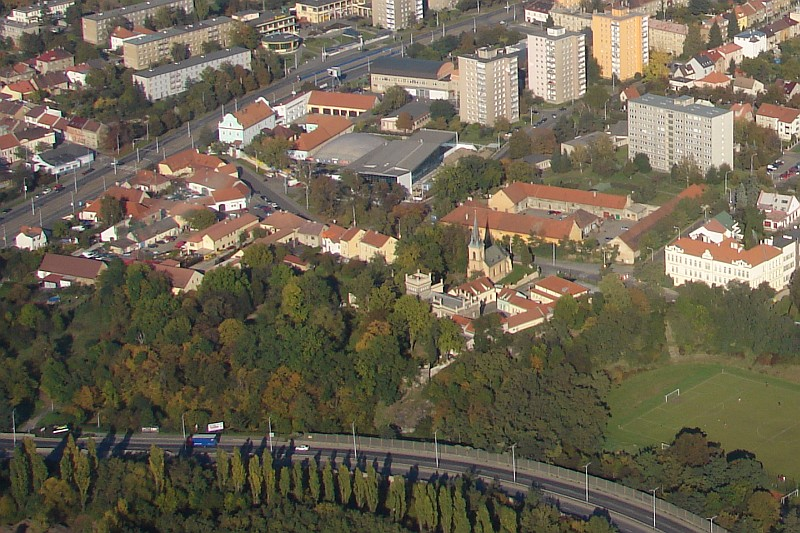
- View of Hloubětín centered on St. George's church

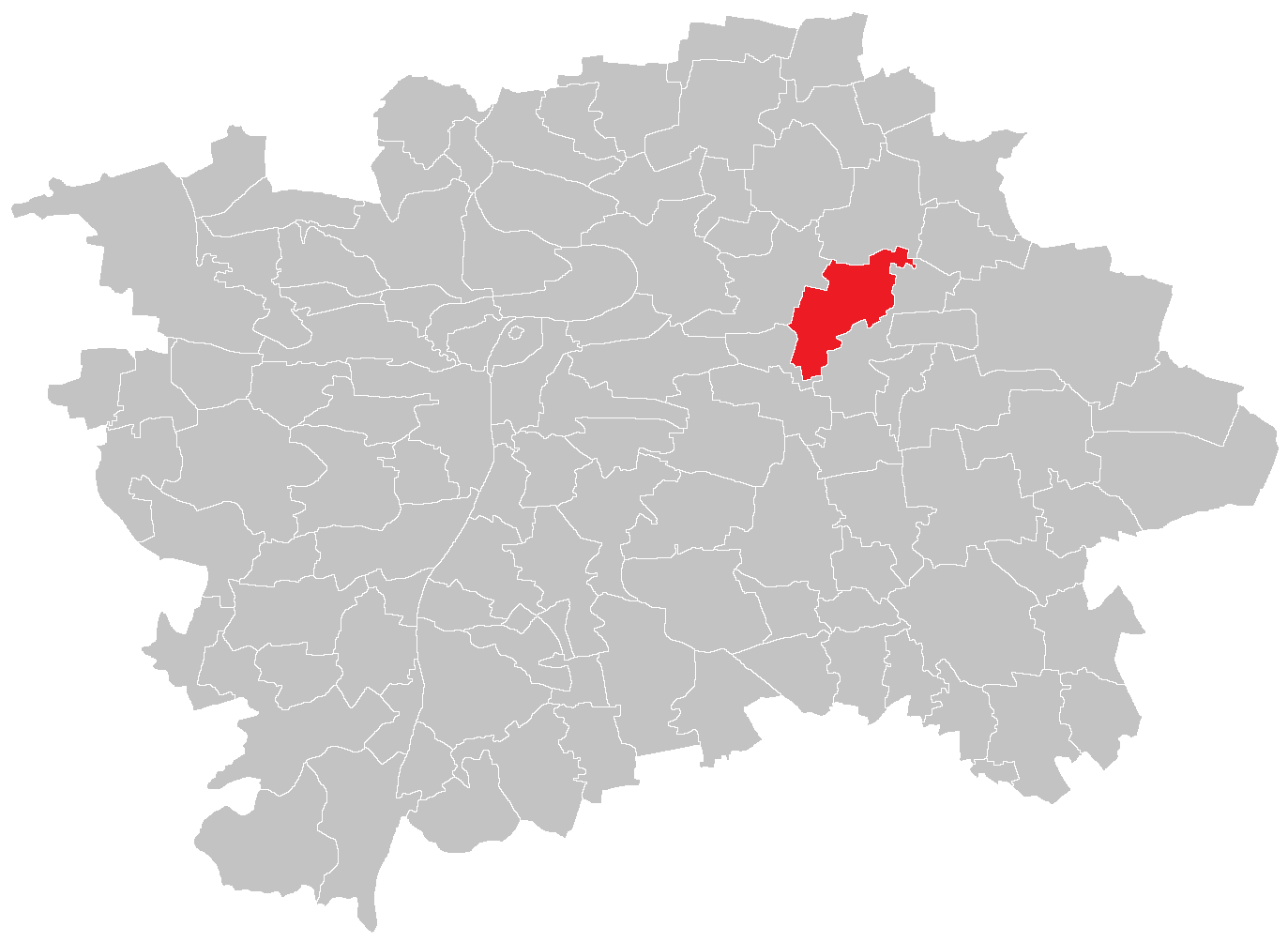
- Location of Hloubětín in Prague
- Coordinates: 50°06′22″N 14°32′08″E
- Country: Czech Republic
- Region: Prague
- District: Prague 9, Prague 10, Prague 14

Area
  - Total: 5.44 km^{2} (2.10 sq mi)

Population (2021)
  - Total: 14,074
  - Density: 2,590/km^{2} (6,700/sq mi)
- Time zone: UTC+1 (CET)
  - Summer (DST): UTC+2 (CEST)
- Postal code: 190 00, 198 00

Hloubětín (Czech pronunciation: [ˈɦloubjɛciːn], German: Tiefenbach) is a district of Prague located 9 kilometres (5.6 mi) from the centre, belonging mostly to Prague 9, with parts of it also belonging to Prague 14 and Prague 10. There were 10,704 people living in this area in 2001. The area, first recorded in the 13th century due to presence of the Teutonic Knights, became part of Prague in 1922. Today it is mainly an industrial area, located on the edge of Prague's so-called průmyslový polookruh (industrial semi-circle). During communist times, Hloubětín was well known as the home of the Tesla company.

== Etymology ==
The name "Hloubětín" derives from the surname Hlúpata, and was previously known as Lupatin, Glupetin, Hlupetin and Hloupětín before becoming Hloubětín in 1907.

== Geography ==
The area lies on the Rokytka river, and its northern reaches back onto the area of Kbely Airport. To the west of Hloubětín lies Hořejší rybník, a protected area centered on a lake.

== Demographics ==
Historical population

Year	Pop.	±%
1869	655	—
1880	833	+27.2%
1890	1,362	+63.5%
1900	1,875	+37.7%
1910	3,266	+74.2%
1921	3,219	−1.4%
1930	7,312	+127.2%
1950	7,047	−3.6%

Year	Pop.	±%
1961	7,006	−0.6%
1970	11,088	+58.3%
1980	9,100	−17.9%
1991	11,471	+26.1%
2001	10,798	−5.9%
2011	12,631	+17.0%
2021	14,074	+11.4%

Source: Censuses

== Transport ==
Hloubětín is located close to the D10 and D11 roads, leading to Mladá Boleslav and Hradec Králové respectively. Hloubětín no longer contains an active railway station but is a short distance from Praha-Kyje railway station and Praha-Rajská zahrada railway station. Line B of the Prague Metro runs through the area; Hloubětín metro station opened in 1999. It is also an important hub on the Prague tram system, housing the Hloubětín tram depot and the Lehovec and Starý Hloubětín turning loops.
