= Poříčany =

- Municipality
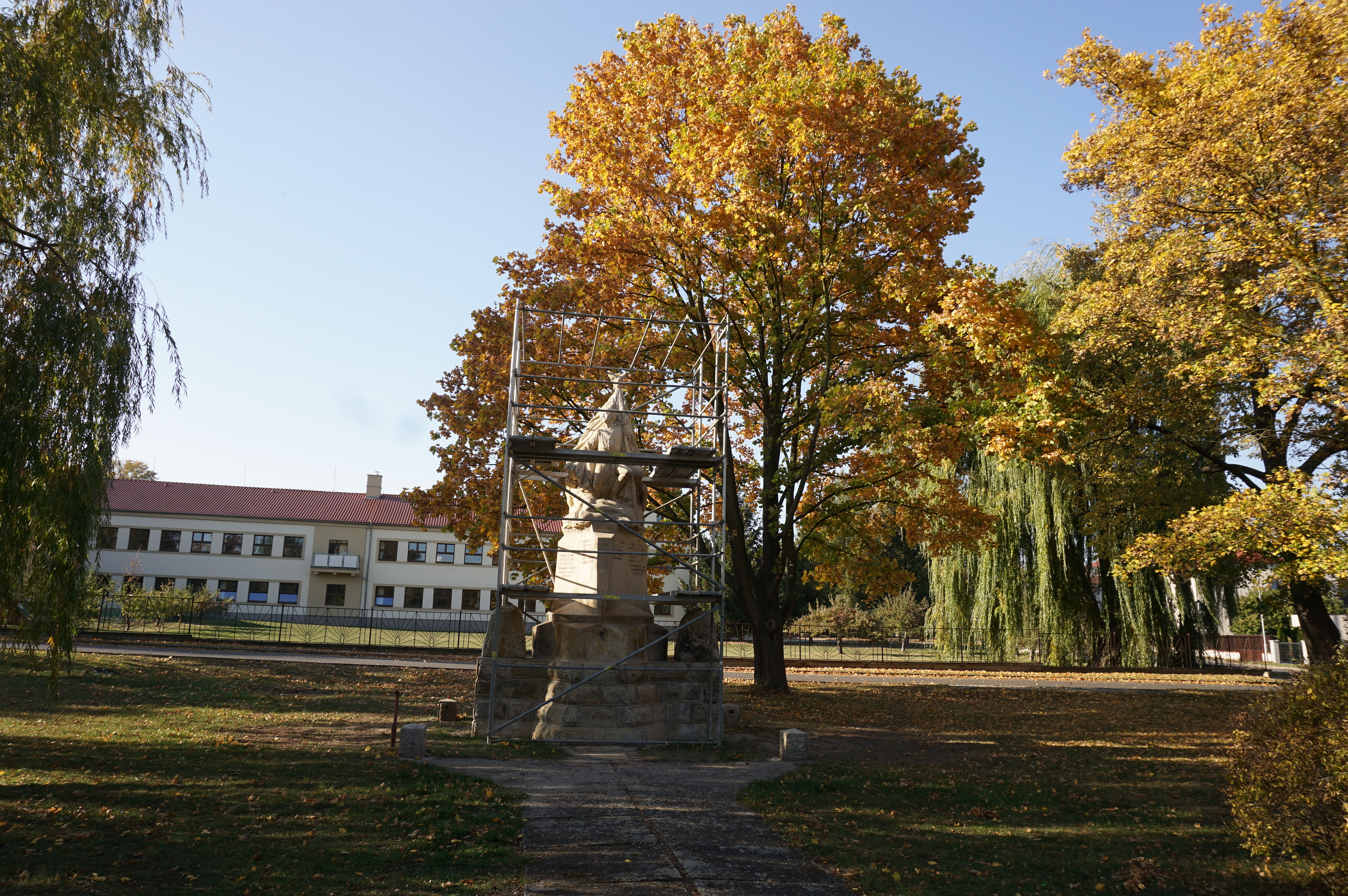
- Park in the centre of Poříčany

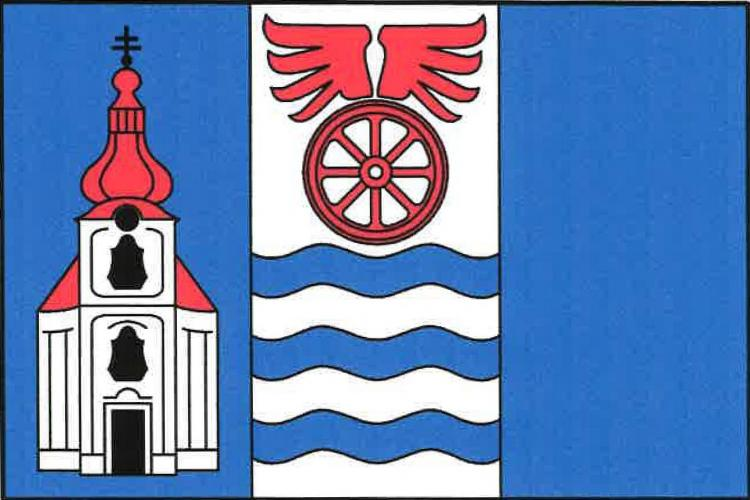
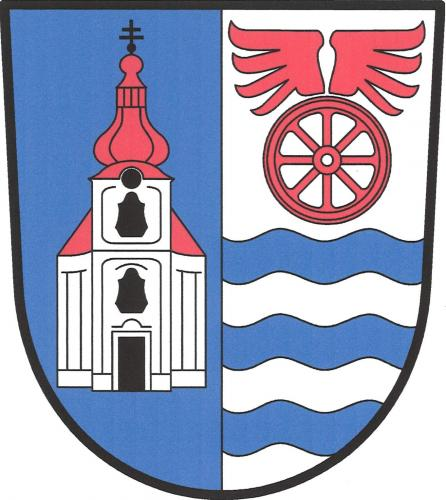
- Flag Coat of arms

- Location in the Czech Republic
- Coordinates: 50°6′29″N 14°55′6″E
- Country: Czech Republic
- Region: Central Bohemian
- District: Kolín
- First mentioned: 1295

Area
  - Total: 5.76 km^{2} (2.22 sq mi)
- Elevation: 203 m (666 ft)

Population (2026-01-01)
  - Total: 1,580
  - Density: 274/km^{2} (710/sq mi)
- Time zone: UTC+1 (CET)
  - Summer (DST): UTC+2 (CEST)
- Postal code: 289 14
- Website: www.obec-poricany.cz

Poříčany is a municipality and village in Kolín District in the Central Bohemian Region of the Czech Republic. It has about 1,600 inhabitants.

== Etymology ==
The name is derived from the Czech word poříčané (from poříčí, i.e. "area around a river"), which denoted people who lived near some river.

== Geography ==
Poříčany is located about 22 kilometres (14 mi) northwest of Kolín and 26 km (16 mi) east of Prague. It lies in a flat landscape in the Central Elbe Table. The Šembera River flows through the municipality.

== History ==
The first written mention of Poříčany is from 1295. From 1547 at the latest, the village was part of the Černý Kostelec estate and shared its owners. In 1626, Albrecht von Wallenstein sold the estate to Karl I, Prince of Liechtenstein. The House of Liechtenstein owned the village until the establishment of an independent municipality after 1848.

The railway through Poříčany was built in 1845 and the railway station was established in 1874. The railway station was the impetus for the development of the village and the influx of new residents.

== Demographics ==
Historical population

Year	Pop.	±%
1869	626	—
1880	899	+43.6%
1890	877	−2.4%
1900	852	−2.9%
1910	977	+14.7%

Year	Pop.	±%
1921	1,000	+2.4%
1930	1,270	+27.0%
1950	1,120	−11.8%
1961	1,226	+9.5%
1970	1,125	−8.2%

Year	Pop.	±%
1980	1,338	+18.9%
1991	1,271	−5.0%
2001	1,205	−5.2%
2011	1,461	+21.2%
2021	1,559	+6.7%

Source: Censuses

== Transport ==
Poříčany is located on the railway lines Prague–Kolín and Nymburk–Poříčany.

== Sights ==
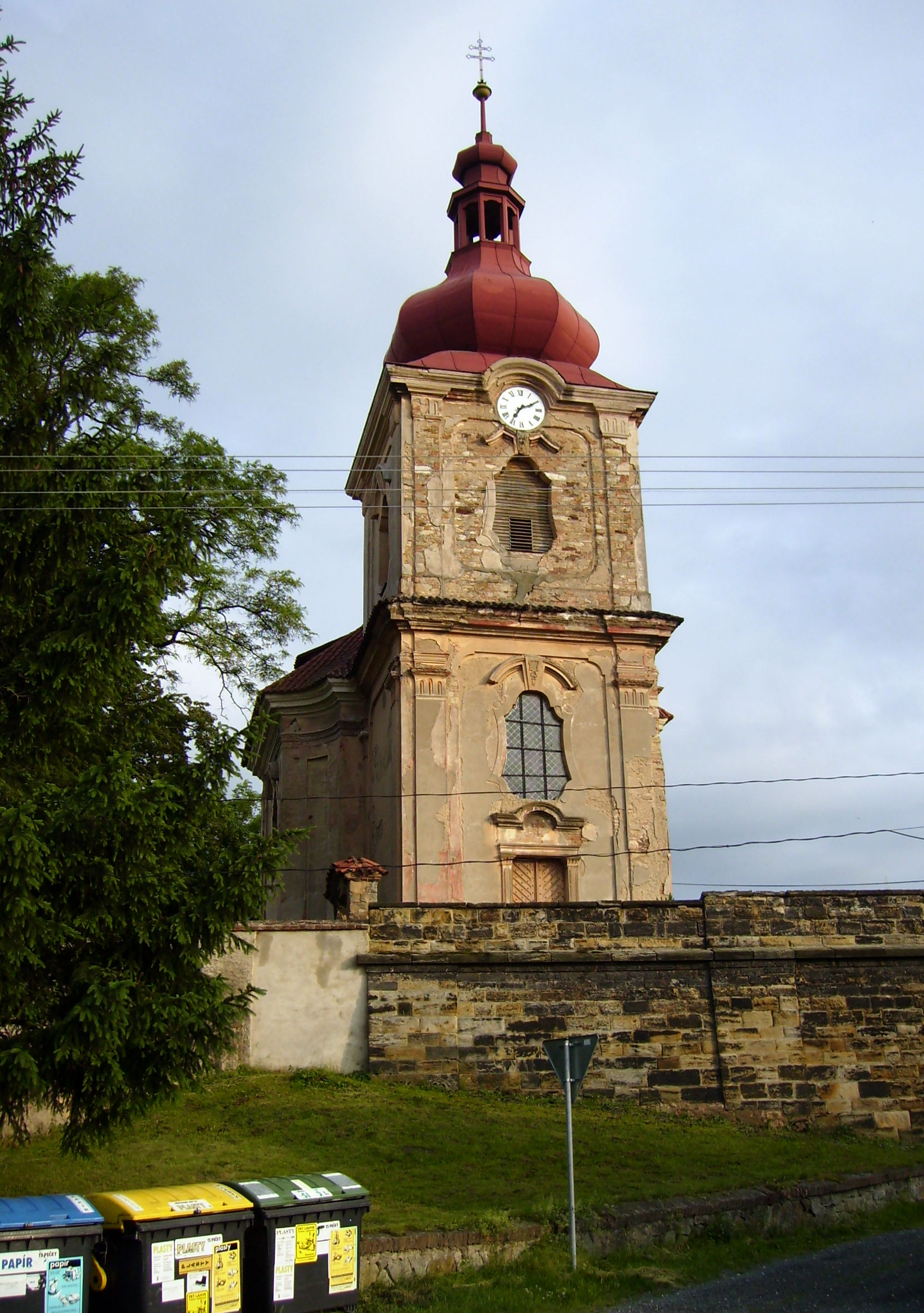
Church of the Nativity of the Virgin Mary

The Church of the Nativity of the Virgin Mary was first documented in the 14th century. The current church is a late Baroque building from the mid-18th century.

== In popular culture ==
Some scenes of the 2005 movie Hostel were filmed in the municipality.
