= Štětí =

- Town
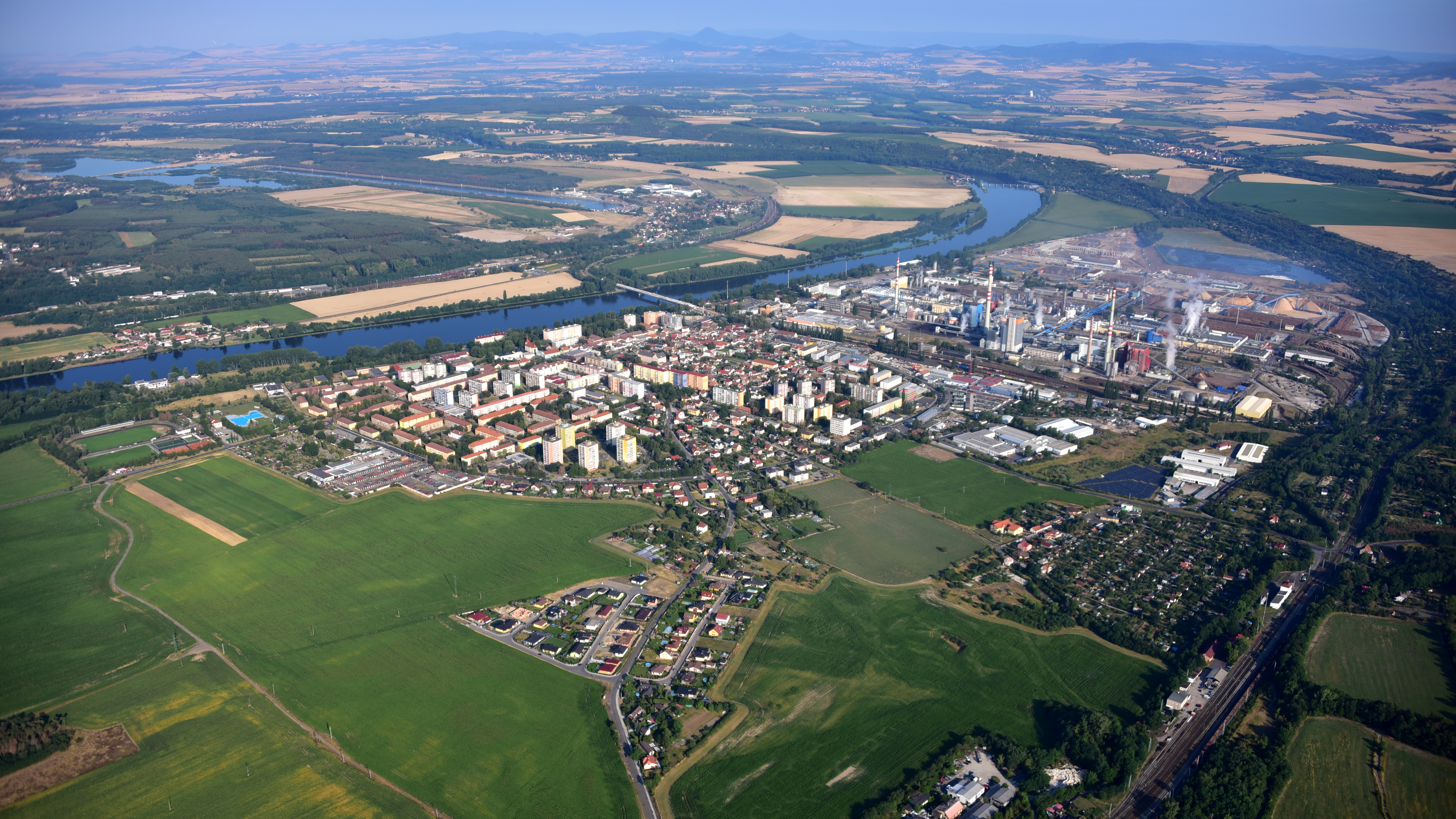
- Aerial view of Štětí

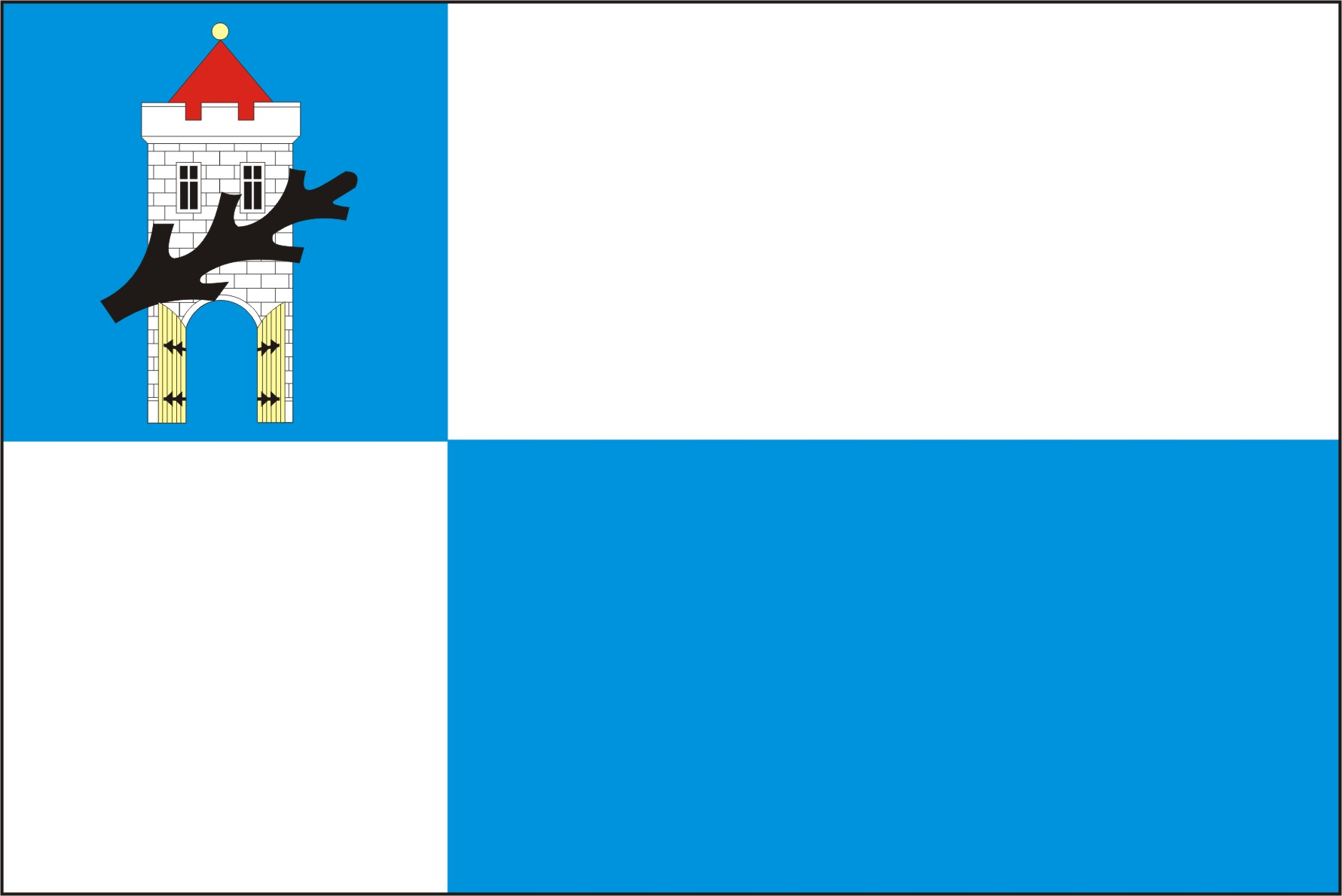
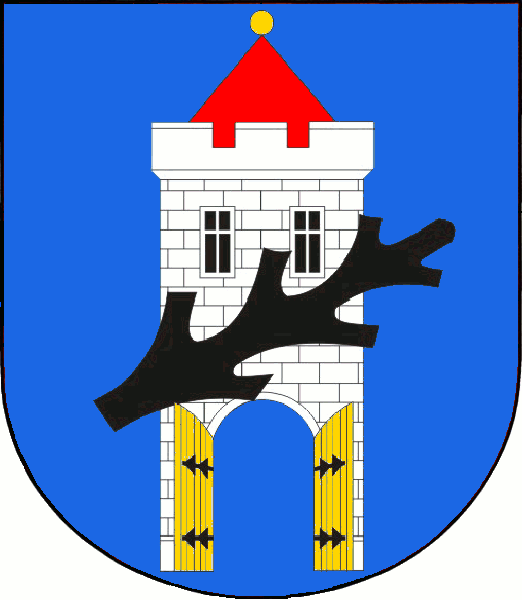
- Flag Coat of arms

- Location in the Czech Republic
- Coordinates: 50°27′11″N 14°22′27″E
- Country: Czech Republic
- Region: Ústí nad Labem
- District: Litoměřice
- First mentioned: 1312

Government
  - Mayor: Vladimír Frey

Area
  - Total: 53.90 km^{2} (20.81 sq mi)
- Elevation: 155 m (509 ft)

Population (2026-01-01)
  - Total: 8,536
  - Density: 158.4/km^{2} (410.2/sq mi)
- Time zone: UTC+1 (CET)
  - Summer (DST): UTC+2 (CEST)
- Postal codes: 411 08, 411 73
- Website: www.steti.cz

Štětí (Czech pronunciation: [ˈʃcɛtiː]; German: Wegstädtl) is a town in Litoměřice District in the Ústí nad Labem Region of the Czech Republic. It has about 8,500 inhabitants. The town is located on the Elbe River, on the border between the Lower Ohře Table and Ralsko Uplands. It is an industrial town known for the largest paper mill in the country. The main historical landmark is the Church of Saints Simon and Jude.

== Administrative division ==
Štětí consists of ten municipal parts (in brackets population according to the 2021 census):

- Štětí (7,029)
- Brocno (223)
- Čakovice (59)
- Chcebuz (259)
- Hněvice (137)
- Počeplice (191)
- Radouň (240)
- Stračí (107)
- Újezd (40)
- Veselí (35)

== Etymology ==
The town's name is derived from the Old Czech word ščetie, which was a term for the poles driven into the swampy terrain as a basis for the upper construction. The German name Wegstädtl was created from the Czech phrase ve Štětí (meaning 'in Štětí'), which was modified into the German words Weg ('road') and Städtl ('little town'). The German name was used from 1720 at the latest.

== Geography ==
Štětí is located about 19 kilometres (12 mi) southeast of Litoměřice and 38 km (24 mi) north of Prague. It lies on the border between the Lower Ohře Table and Ralsko Uplands. The highest point is the hill Újezdský Špičák at 348 m (1,142 ft) above sea level. The town is situated on the right bank of the Elbe River. The eastern part of the municipal territory lies in the Kokořínsko – Máchův kraj Protected Landscape Area.

== History ==
The first written mention of Štětí is from 1312. For centuries, it was part of the Mělník estate, owned first by Bohemian queens and later by various noble families. From 1542, the estate was owned by Zdislav Berka of Dubá. During his rule, in 1549, Štětí was promoted to a town. During the Thirty Years' War, the town was looted several times. In 1654, Štětí was still ethnically Czech, but in the following decades, German settlers came to the town, which gradually became predominantly ethnically German.

During the 18th century, the town was hit by various disasters: the passage of troops, floods, epidemics, crop failures and a large fire in 1788. The economic boom occurred in the 19th century. In addition to agriculture and river fishing, Štětí was famous for the production of stockings. In the second half of the 19th century, the railway was built and the town was industrialised.

== Demographics ==
Historical population

Year	Pop.	±%
1869	4,855	—
1880	5,137	+5.8%
1890	5,056	−1.6%
1900	4,902	−3.0%
1910	4,796	−2.2%

Year	Pop.	±%
1921	4,969	+3.6%
1930	4,982	+0.3%
1950	3,628	−27.2%
1961	5,724	+57.8%
1970	7,016	+22.6%

Year	Pop.	±%
1980	9,054	+29.0%
1991	8,571	−5.3%
2001	9,197	+7.3%
2011	8,852	−3.8%
2021	8,320	−6.0%

Source: Censuses

== Economy ==
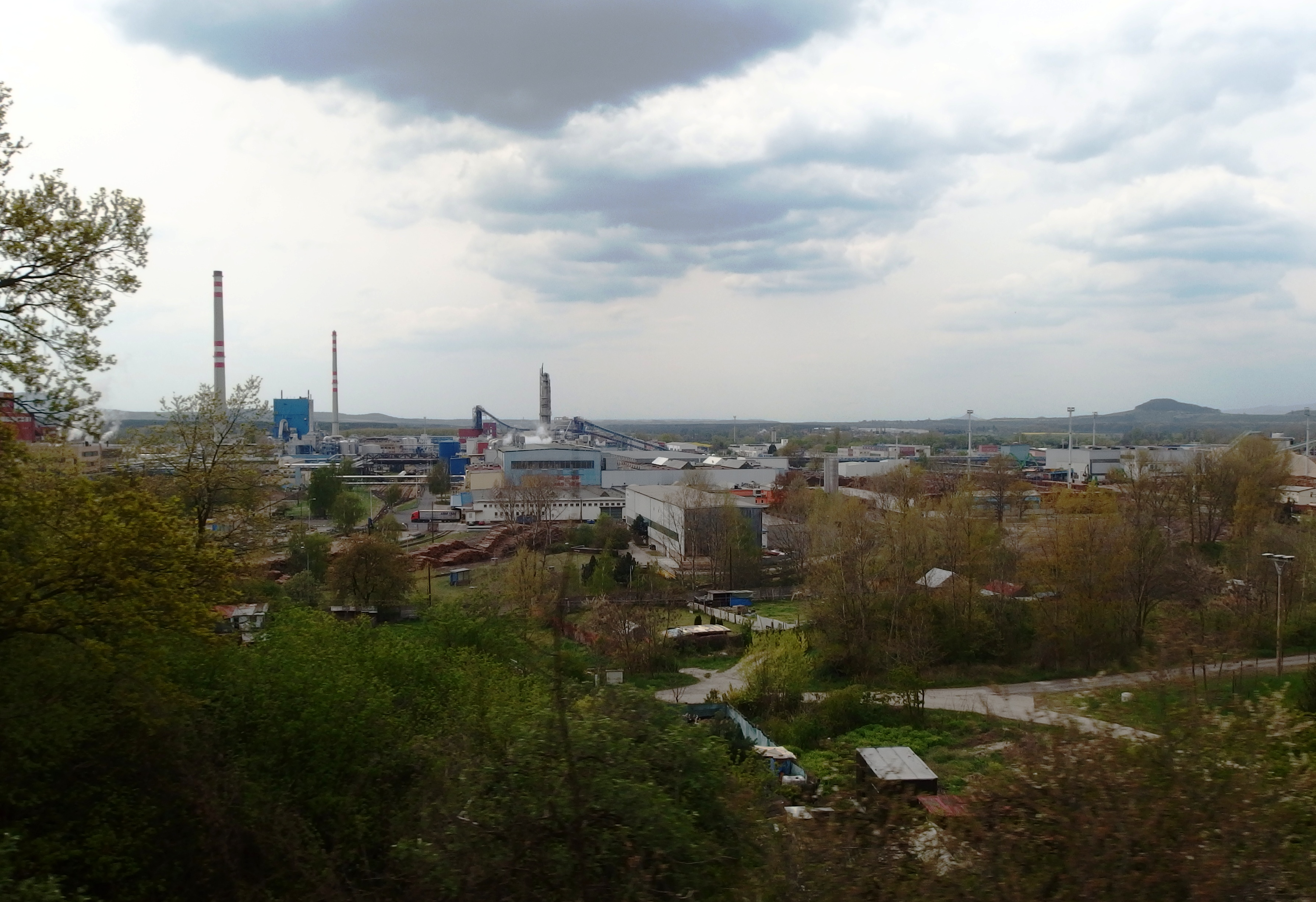
Paper mill

Štětí is known as an industrial centre. The town is home to the largest paper mill in the Czech Republic. The paper mill is a part of the Mondi group.

== Transport ==
Štětí is located on the railway lines heading from Ústí nad Labem to Kolín and to Lysá nad Labem.

== Sights ==
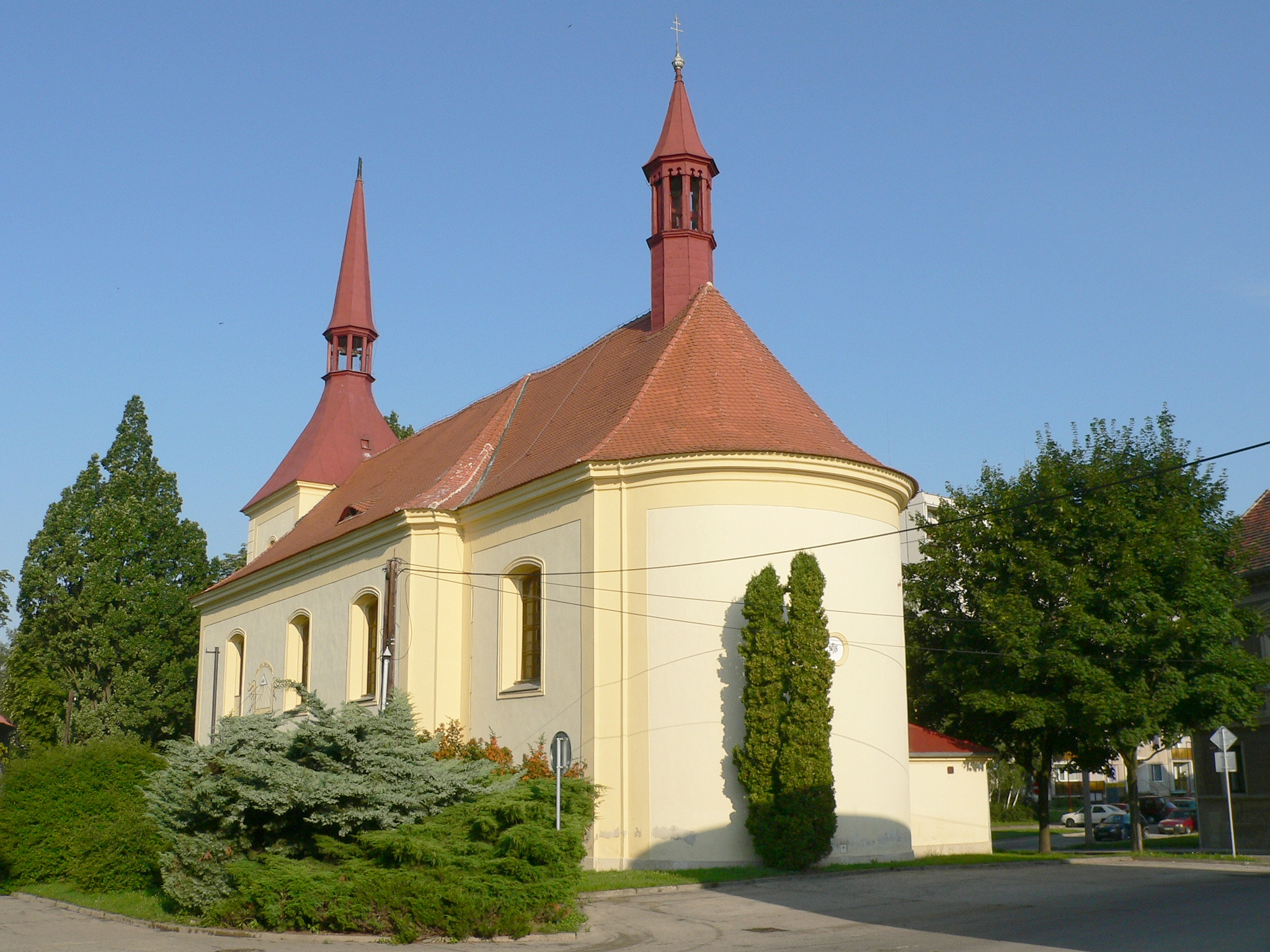
Church of Saints Simon and Jude

The most significant building is the Church of Saints Simon and Jude. Originally it was built in the 14th century, but it was destroyed by a flood in 1784 and rebuilt in 1785.

The Church of Saints Peter and Paul is the main landmark of Chcebuz. It was built in the Baroque style in 1781–1784.

== Notable people ==
- Franz Reichelt (1878–1912), Austrian tailor and inventor
