= Praha-Bubny railway station =

Railway station in Prague, Czech Republic

Praha-Bubny
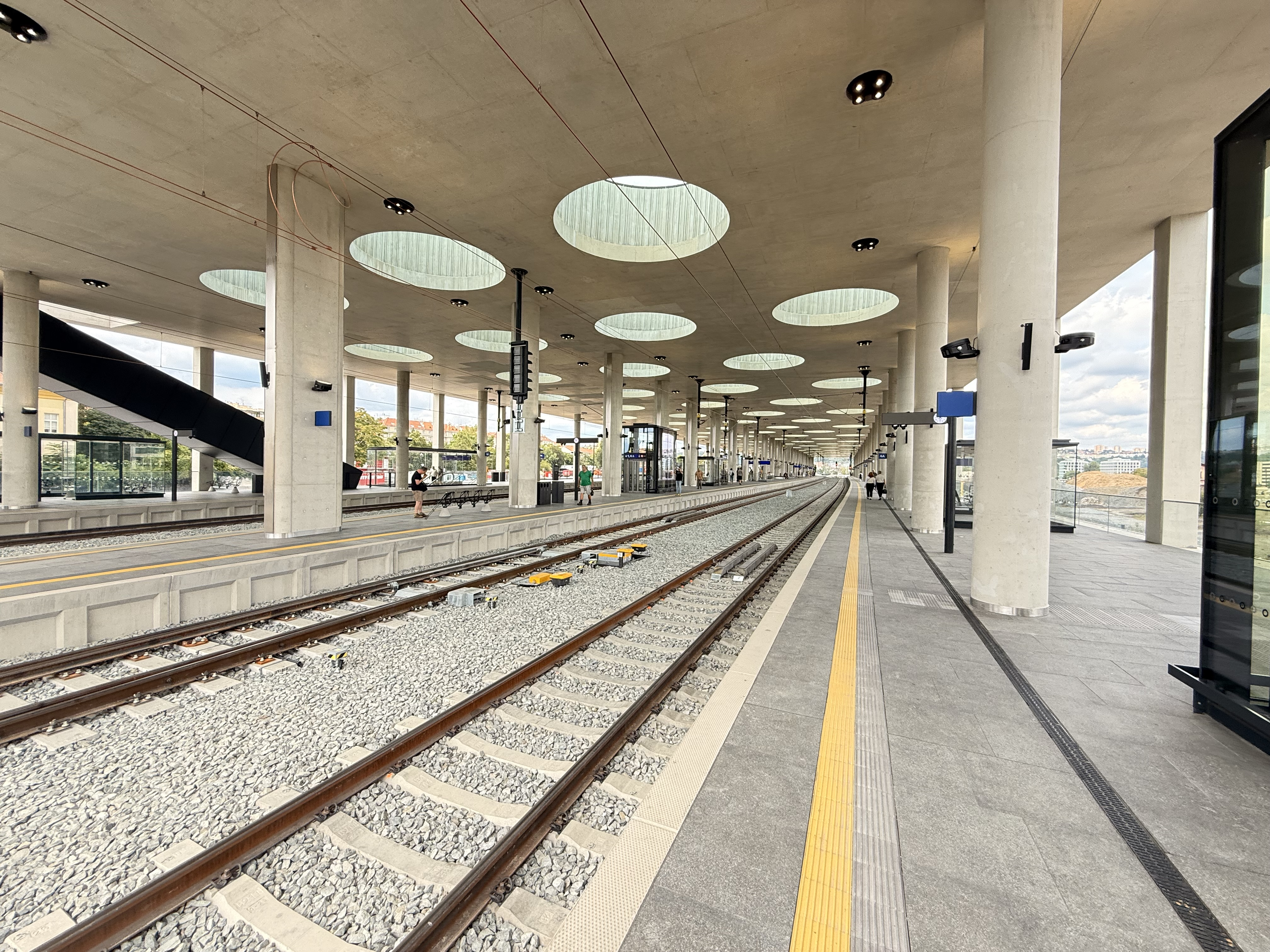
- Station platforms

General information
- Location: Holešovice, Prague, Czech Republic
- Coordinates: 50.10063°N 14.43994°E
- Owner: Správa železnic
- Lines: 091 Praha-Hostivař – Kralupy nad Vltavou; 120 Praha – Kladno – Rakovník
- Platforms: 3
- Tracks: 4
- Connections: C Vltavská 1, 5, 18, 20, 25 156

Other information
- Fare zone: PID: P

History
- Opened: 1868
- Rebuilt: 2023–2025
Location

Praha-Bubny (Czech: Železniční stanice Praha-Bubny) is a railway station located in Prague 7 in the Holešovice cadastral area. It is located on track 120, leading from Prague to Kladno and Rakovník, and on track 091, leading from Praha-Hostivař to Kralupy nad Vltavou, next to the entrance to Vltavská metro station on line C.

The station opened in 1868. During the Second World War, around 50,000 people, most of them Jews, were deported from the station to ghettos and concentration camps. Between 2023 and 2025, the station was completely rebuilt as part of the modernisation of the line to Kladno and the new branch to Václav Havel Airport. The new station building opened in August 2025, while the original building is being converted into a Holocaust memorial, the Centre for Memory and Dialogue Bubny.

== History ==
The station was opened in 1868 by the Buštěhrad Railway company. During the 19th century, it grew to include extensive rolling stock depots, engine sheds, a sawmill and paint shops. The station building that survives today was built between 1928 and 1933.

=== Deportations during the Second World War ===
During the German occupation, the station became the departure point for the transports of Jews from Prague. The first transport left Bubny on 16 October 1941, carrying 1,000 people to the Łódź Ghetto; only 24 of them survived the war. Later transports went mainly to the Theresienstadt Ghetto, from where many of the deportees were sent on to extermination camps. People who received a summons for transport first had to report to an assembly point in a nearby building of the Prague Sample Fairs. Between 1941 and 1945, more than 50,000 Jews and people classified as Jews were deported through the station.

=== Memorial ===
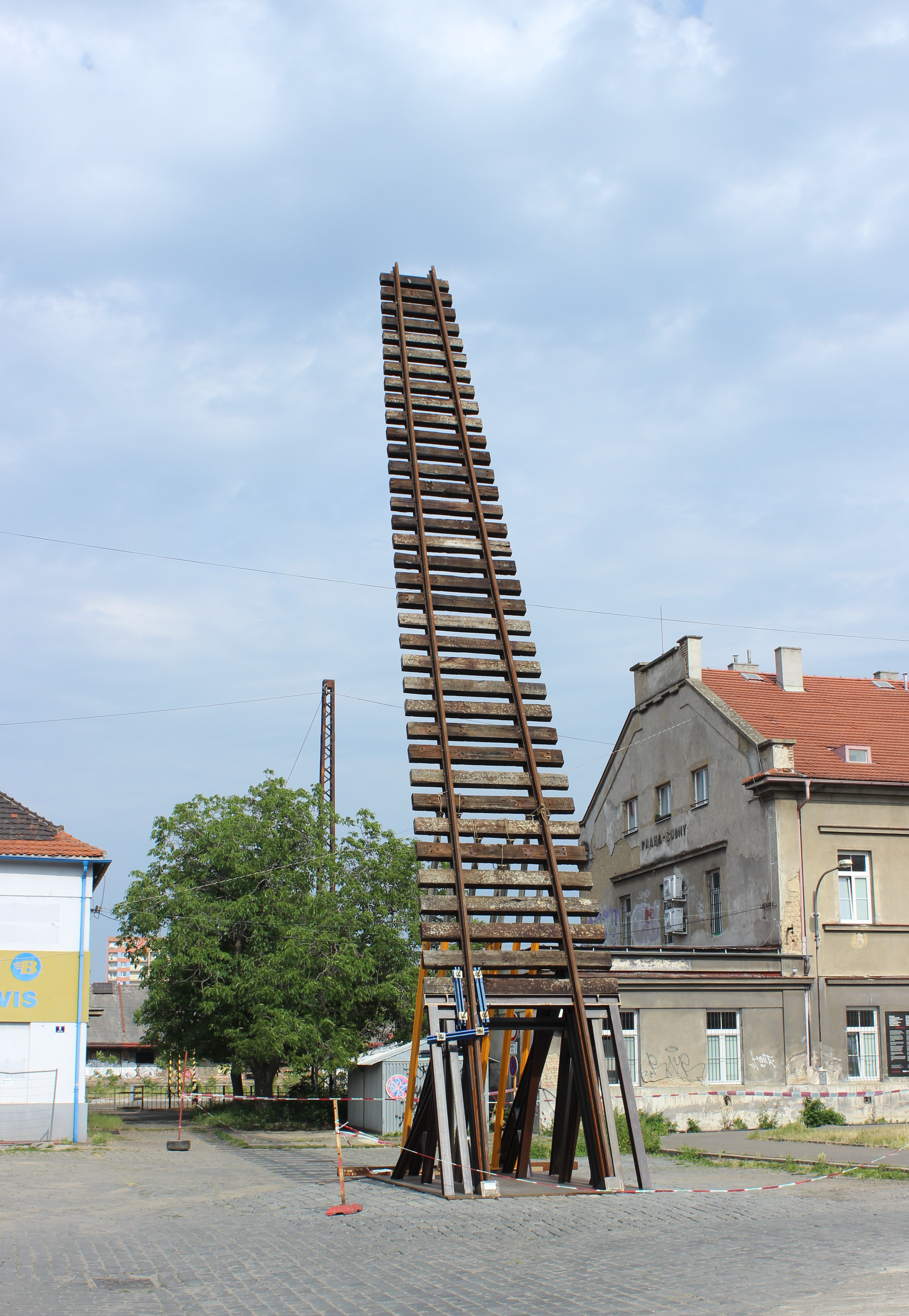
Gate of No Return, a memorial at the former railway station commemorating the deportation of Jews

The original station building was at first planned to be demolished, but it was preserved as a memorial to the persecution of Jews after pressure from Jewish organisations and other activists. In 2015, work began on turning the building into the Memorial of Silence (Památník ticha). On 9 March 2015, the sculpture Gate of No Return by Aleš Veselý, in the form of a railway track rising towards the sky, was unveiled at the station as a symbolic foundation stone of the memorial. The date marked the anniversary of the night of 8–9 March 1944, when around 4,000 prisoners of the Theresienstadt family camp were murdered in Auschwitz.

In autumn 2024, the project was renamed the Centre for Memory and Dialogue Bubny (Centrum paměti a dialogu Bubny). The centre is a cultural and educational institution of the Ministry of Culture; the reconstruction of the building is managed by Správa železnic, while the centre prepares the exhibitions. The conversion of the old station building began on 14 July 2025. It was designed by ARN Studio and is being carried out by Metrostav DIZ at a cost of CZK 186.9 million, and is expected to take two years. The building will house exhibitions, educational programmes, cultural events and a café.

== Modernisation ==
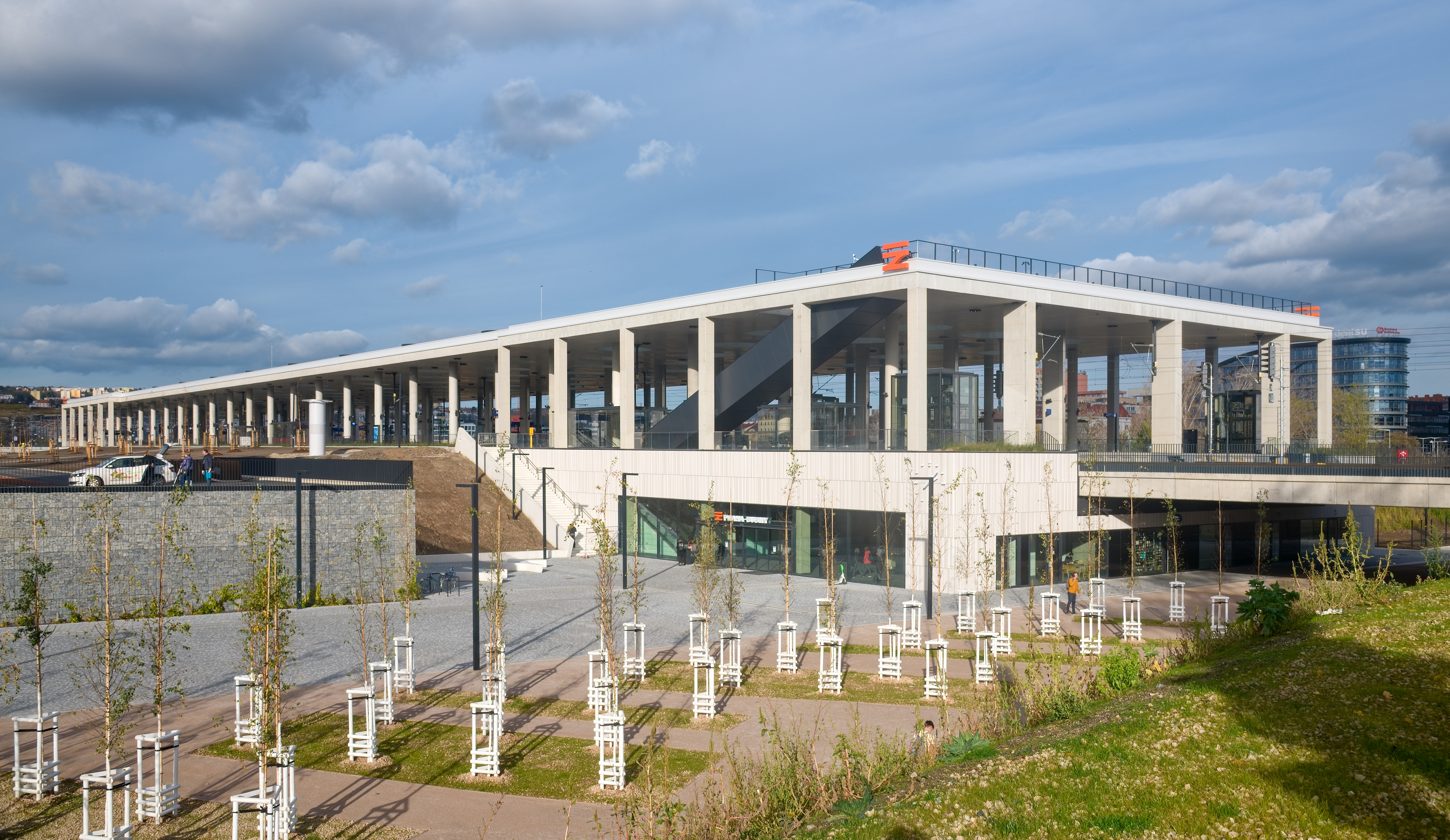
Exterior of the new station

Between January 2023 and August 2025, the line between Praha-Bubny and Praha-Výstaviště was modernised as part of the reconstruction of the railway to Kladno and the planned rail link to Václav Havel Airport. The project was commissioned by Správa železnic, designed by Metroprojekt Praha and built by Metrostav TBR, OHLA ŽS and Elektrizace železnic Praha. It cost CZK 3.79 billion excluding VAT and was co-financed by the European Union's Connecting Europe Facility. The whole section was converted from single to double track, and the busy level crossing on Bubenská street was removed.

=== New station building ===
Station interior

The new station was built several hundred metres away from the original one, with its platforms closer to the vestibule of Vltavská metro station. The building, designed by Jakub Cigler Architekti, is 250 metres long and 50 metres wide and stands on pillars, with more than ten commercial units beneath it. It has four tracks and three platforms, reached by escalators and lifts, with glazed waiting rooms and trees growing inside the hall. The tracks and platforms run through the interior of the building. The hall has a white exposed concrete ceiling pierced by circular skylights, and its roof carries a viewing terrace that can be reached by stairs from the first platform. The project was entered in the transport infrastructure category of the Stavba roku 2026 competition.

The new station opened to trains towards Kralupy nad Vltavou on 2 August 2025 and to trains towards Kladno on 4 August 2025. It now serves passengers on the Prague – Kralupy nad Vltavou route, replacing the Praha-Holešovice zastávka halt, which had been in use since 1890 and closed on 3 March 2025.

Správa železnic plans to move all of its Prague offices into a new administrative building to be built above the station, extending towards Vltavská. The preparation of the extension is expected to take at least two years, and the roof terrace will be lost once the extension is built above it.

=== Viaducts ===
North of the station, the line from Kladno runs between Praha-Výstaviště and Praha-Bubny on a new double-track viaduct about 559 metres long, which follows Strojnická street and crosses the streets between Bubenská and Dukelských hrdinů. It was moved slightly away from the original route to reduce noise, and is fitted with 1.8-metre noise barriers. The prestressed concrete structure consists of nine independent sections of continuous beams with two to four spans, the longest section being 98 metres long.

The line from Kralupy nad Vltavou reaches the station on a second, shorter viaduct, 197 metres long, which begins just past Praha-Holešovice station. It was built low above the ground, so that the terrain beneath it can later be lowered by up to 5 metres.

At the northern end of the viaduct carrying the line towards Kladno, a new stop, Praha-Výstaviště, was built near Výstaviště and Stromovka park. A new footbridge over the tracks to Kladno improves access between Letná and Stromovka.

== Services ==
Preceding station	Esko Prague	Following station
Terminus	S4	Praha-Podbaba towards Kralupy nad Vltavou or Hněvice
Praha Masarykovo nádraží Terminus	S5	Praha-Výstaviště towards Kladno
Praha Masarykovo nádraží Terminus	S54	Praha-Výstaviště towards Středokluky or Slaný
Praha Masarykovo nádraží Terminus	R24	Praha-Výstaviště towards Rakovník
Praha Masarykovo nádraží Terminus	R45	Praha-Výstaviště towards Kladno
