= Subway (crossing) =

Underpass for pedestrians and cycles

A subway under a busy road in Prague, Czechia

A subway, also known as an underpass, is a grade-separated pedestrian crossing running underneath a road or railway in order to entirely separate pedestrians and cyclists from motor or train traffic.

== Terminology ==
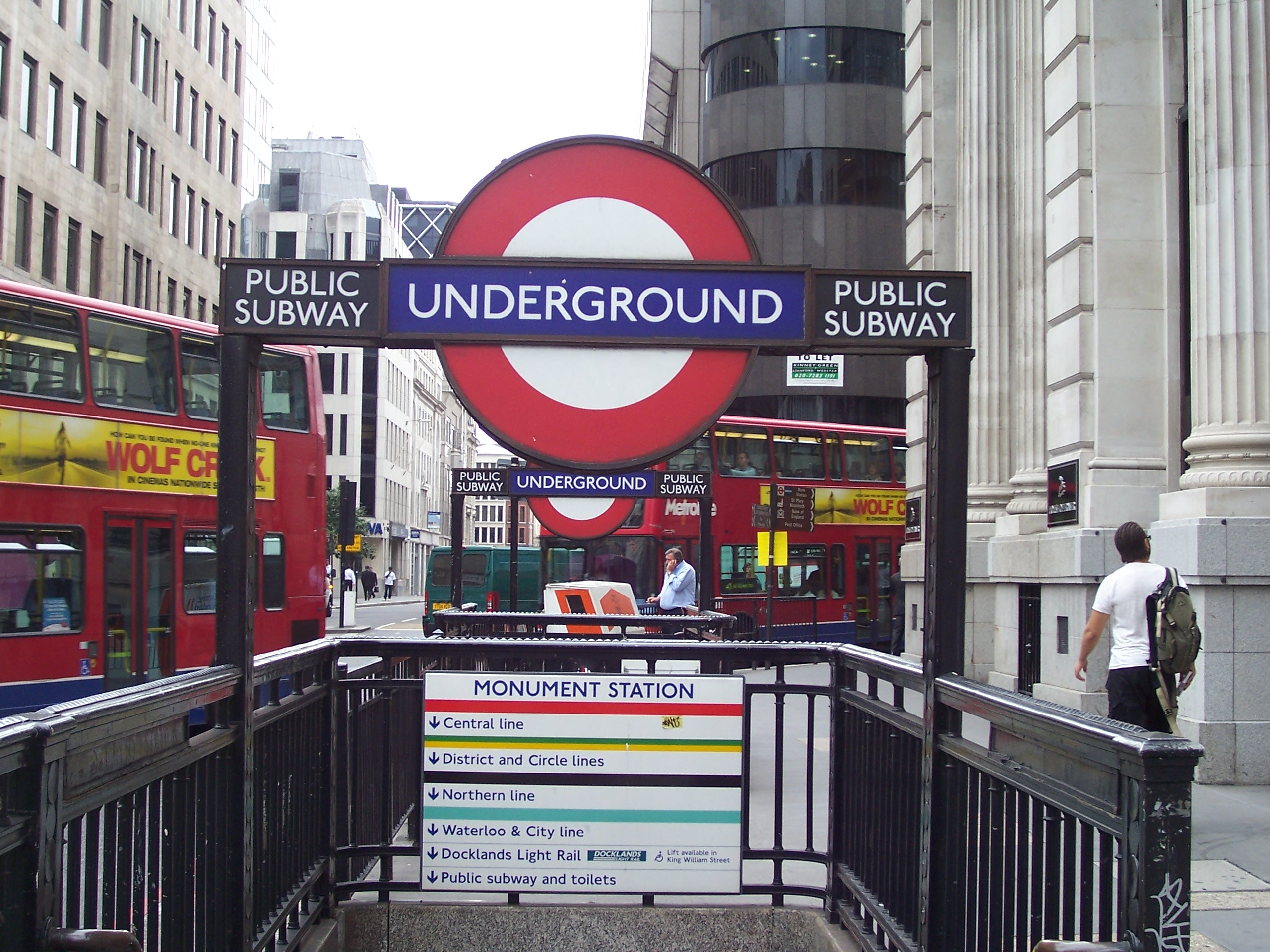
The 'Public Subway' sign at Monument station's entrance refers to the pedestrian subways underneath the junction, not to the London Underground.

In the United States, as used by Caltrans and in parts of Pennsylvania such as Harrisburg, Duncannon and Wyoming County, subway refers to a depressed road undercrossing. Where they are built elsewhere in the country, the term 'pedestrian underpass' is more likely to be used, because "subway" in North America refers to rapid transit systems such as the New York City Subway or the Toronto subway. This usage also occurs in Scotland, where the underground railway in Glasgow is referred to as the Glasgow Subway.

== Effects ==
Pedestrian underpasses allow for the uninterrupted flow of both pedestrians and vehicle traffic. However, they are normally considered a last resort by modern urban planners as they can be expensive and cause graffiti and security issues.

Pedestrians will not use an underpass where a more direct at-grade option is available.

Badly designed subways may not provide for disabled users, especially those in a wheelchair who cannot use stairs. As the underpass is normally below the level of the footway and carriageway (rather than the carriageway being lifted over the road), technologies such as stairs, lifts and ramps must be used. A subway under the A38 in Birmingham city centre was criticised for having a ramp on one side but only stairs on the other side.

== Usage in different countries ==
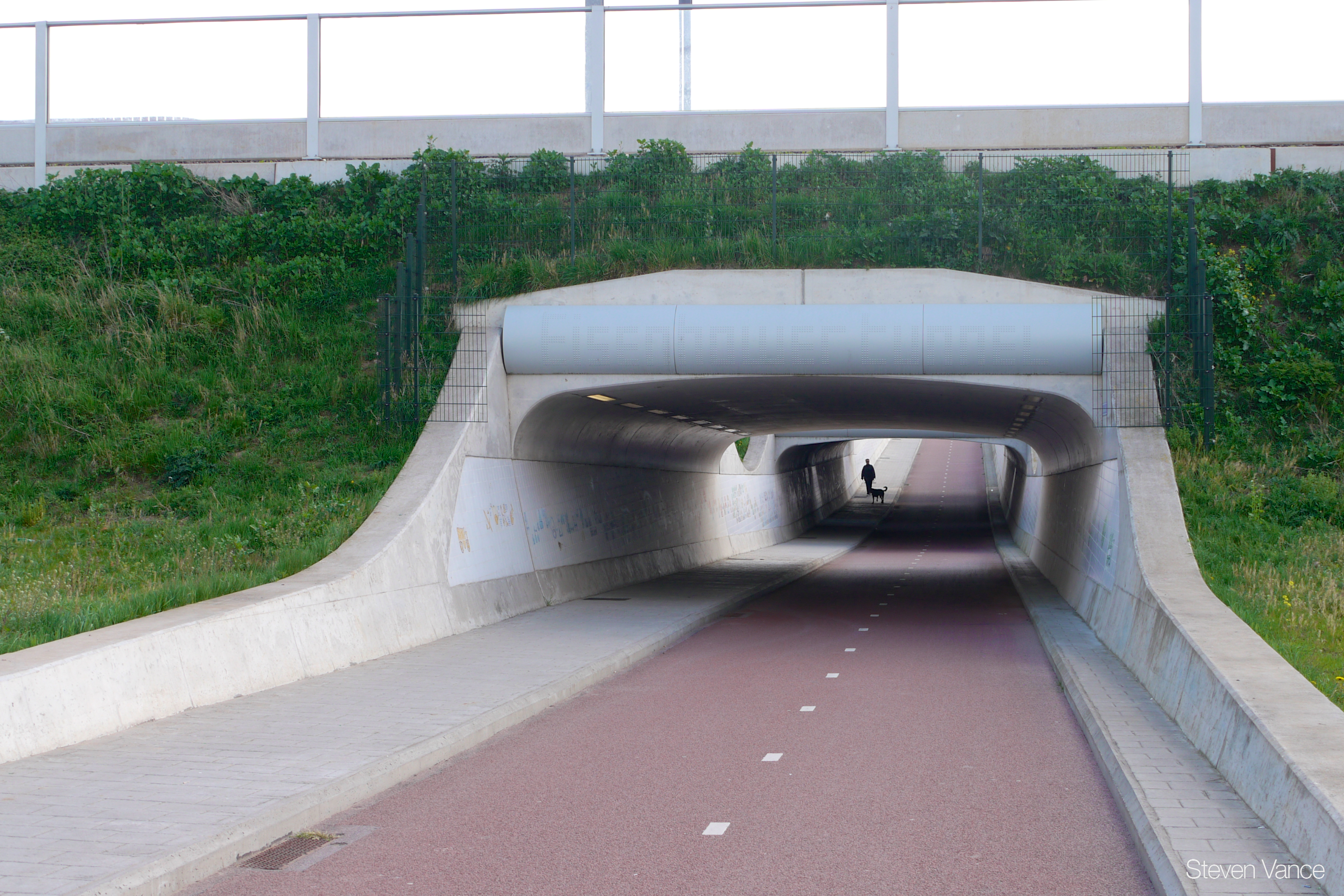
A cycle underpass in the Netherlands

Subways are characteristic of European post-war suburbs and new towns. In Milton Keynes, a new town in the UK, alongside the grid of expressways are a system of shared-use paths known as redways. To reduce conflict with the grid system vehicle traffic (which normally has high speeds), redways normally run underneath grid roads.

In the Netherlands, underpasses for cyclists and pedestrians are often built as part of bikeways, often to replace level crossings or at-grade cyclist/pedestrian crossings. At Bilthoven station, the cycle track and major road previously crossed the railway at grade. To reduce delays, new separate underpasses were built, with motor traffic given a longer route than active travel modes. In 's-Hertogenbosch, the urban ring road has only one level crossing, but has ten overpasses and fourteen underpasses to ensure the road does not form a barrier to cyclists and pedestrians.

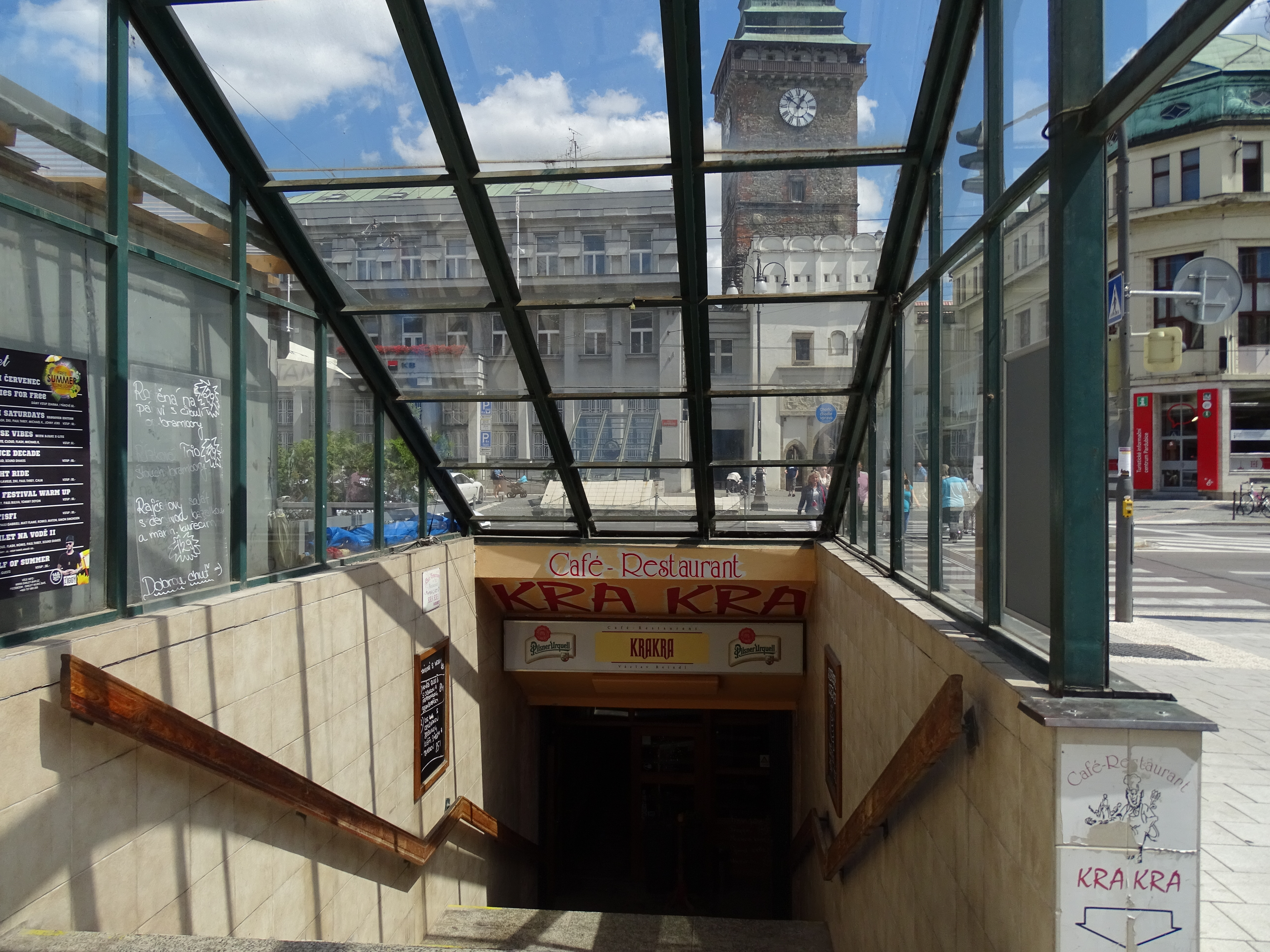
Cancelled underpass in the centre of Pardubice, Czechia, repurposed into a café restaurant

In Czechia, building subways under major city streets was popular mainly from the mid-1960s to the mid-1990s. After 2000, the prevailing tendency is to calm down urban traffic by building bypasses and ring roads and preferring non-motorized traffic within cities. Underpasses and footbridges that lengthen pedestrians' journeys or do not allow wheelchair access are no longer acceptable. Clarity and a sense of security are also taken into account. Some subways have been cancelled, destroyed, buried or leased for other purposes. In 2022, Institute of Planning and Development of Prague (IPR) prepared a study of the revitalization of the Prague subways. Of the 123 underpasses under the administration of the municipal road manager (TSK), 30 were proposed to be canceled, 41 to be evaluated as part of a comprehensive solution for the given area, and the last to be revitalized or reconstructed, themselves or including modification of access roads. At railway stations on the main lines, access via an underpass or footbridge is standard. The current trend is to extend the underpasses, which originally led only from one side of the track, to allow access from the opposite side as well. At the main railway station in Prague, access to the Žižkov side was ceremoniously opened on 24 September 2021. Similar modification was carried out, for example, in Olomouc (2006), Praha-Holešovice (2023) and others.

Subways are less common in North American cities than in European cities of comparable size. They are constructed when it is necessary for pedestrians to cross a railway line or a dual carriageway such as an interstate highway, and they appear at the exits from underground rapid transit systems, but one would be rarely built to enable people to cross an ordinary city street.

In the Philippines, the term is also underpass, and there are two types: underpasses for pedestrians such as along Ayala Avenue in Makati and in the City of Manila near Quiapo Church, and vehicular ones along the length of EDSA and other thoroughfares. One of the earliest and most notable vehicular underpasses is the "Lagusnilad" in front of Manila City Hall.

== Art ==
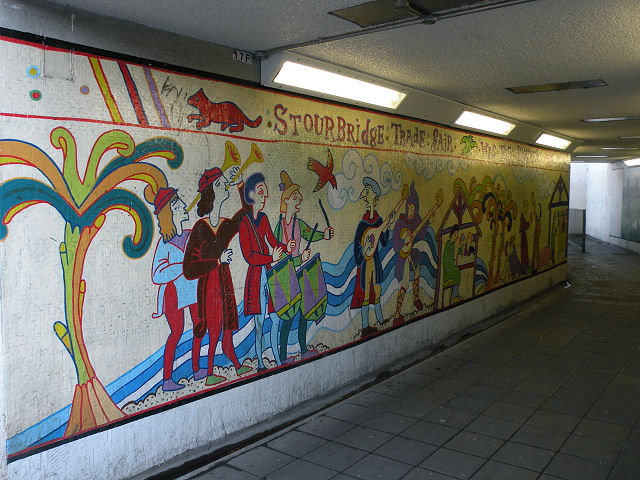
Public art in a subway

Subways can present an opportunity for public art projects, especially murals. Most cycle underpasses in the Netherlands have works of art on the walls to make the tunnels less scary. Such public art projects can be community projects to showcase the work of local and lesser-known artists, and can receive positive feedback from members of the public. If done as acts of protest, such art projects can be controversial. In 2021, a mural painted by in Passaic County, New Jersey by Black Lives Matter activists was ordered to be removed by local officials after they received complaints.

== Wildlife tunnels ==
Subways can also be designed for users other than pedestrians or cyclists. Wildlife tunnels allow animals to safely cross busy roads, reducing the risk of animal-vehicle collisions. They can also be used by humans walking on trails through nature reserves.

== Gallery ==
A subway road sign (ex-USSR)

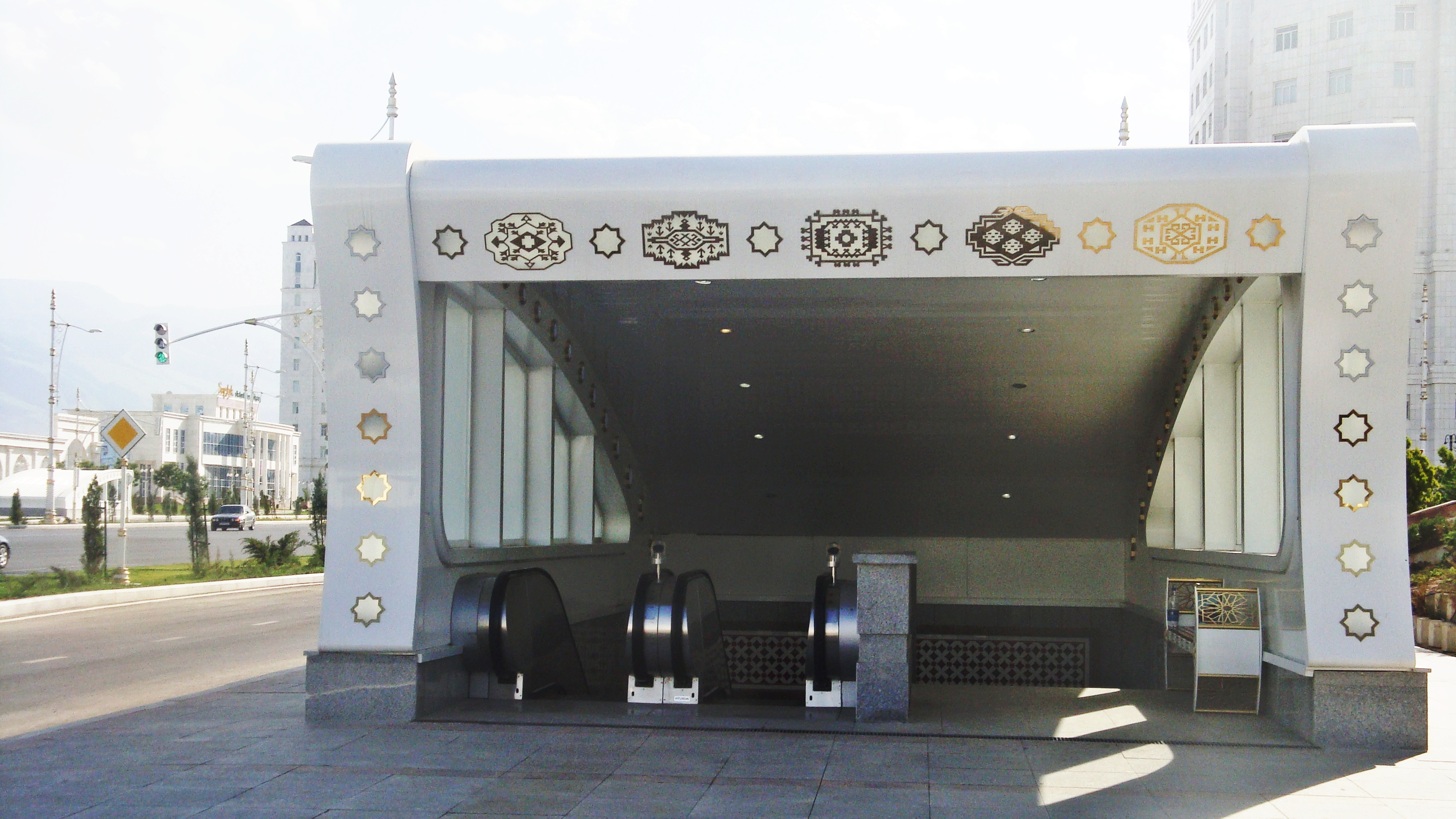
A subway in Ashgabat

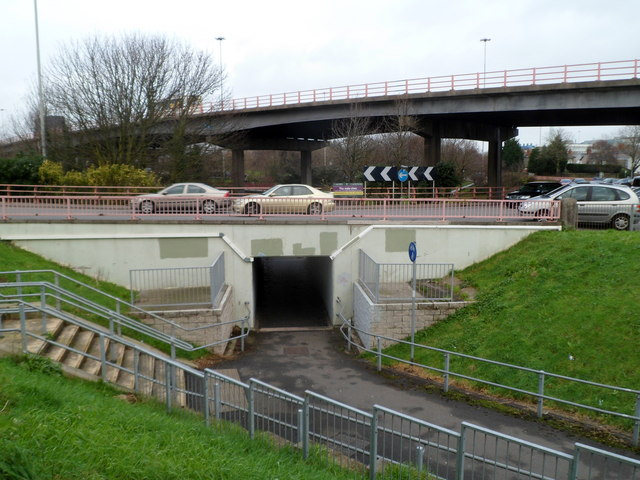
A pedestrian and cyclist subway under a roundabout in Cardiff, Wales

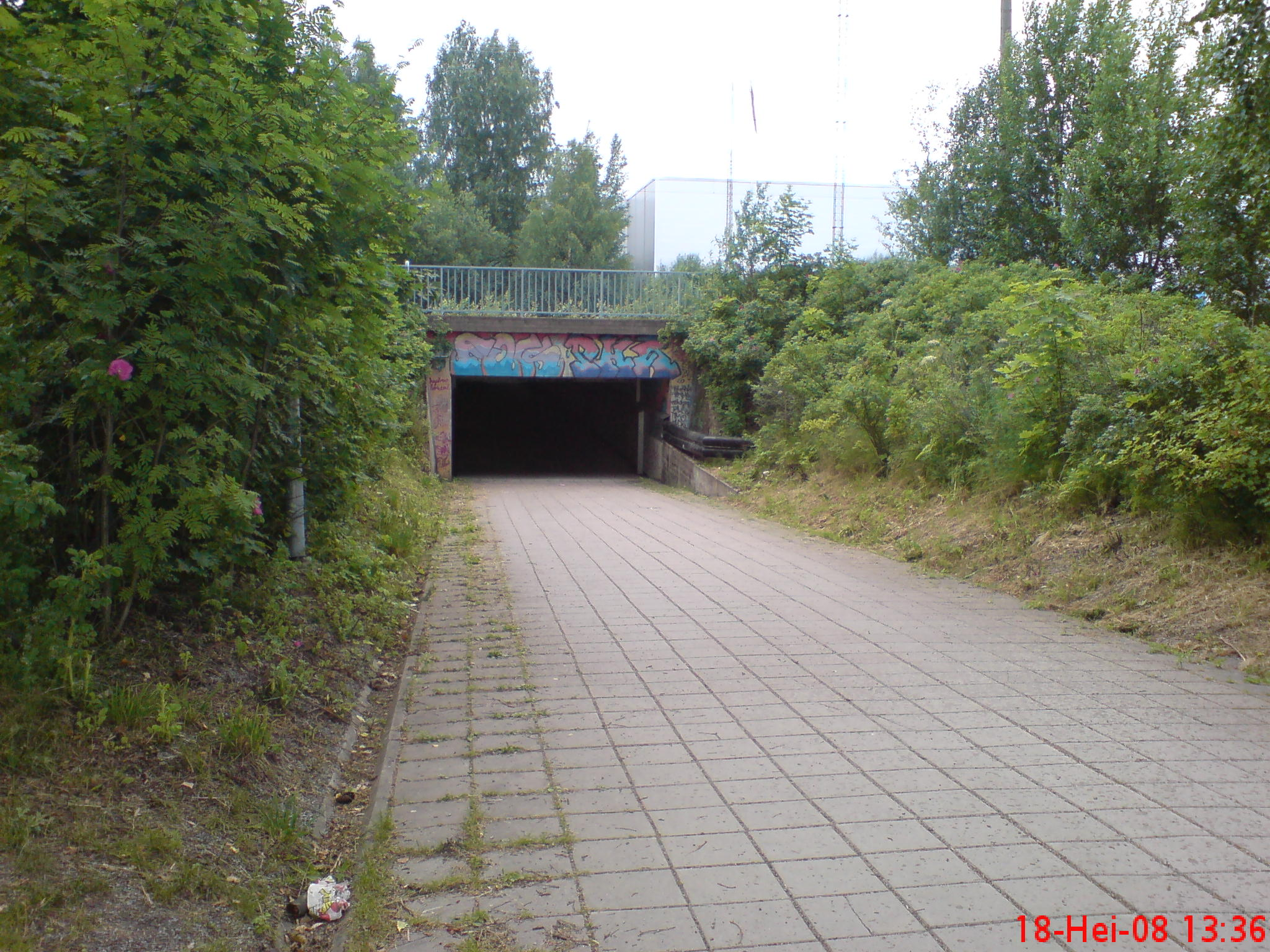
A subway under the railway viewed from taxi station in Nokia, Finland

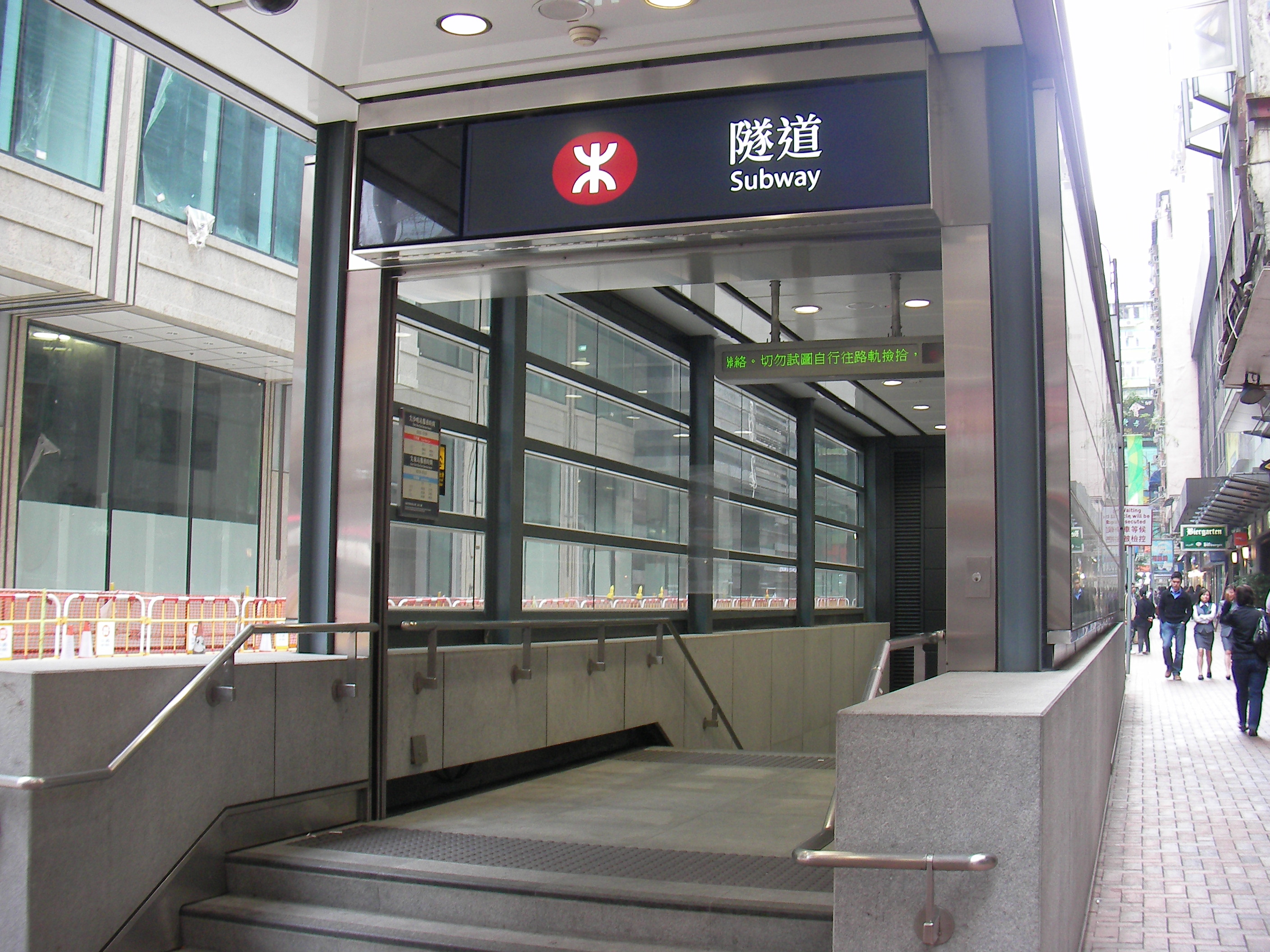
A subway in Hong Kong leading to an underground MTR station and shopping centres

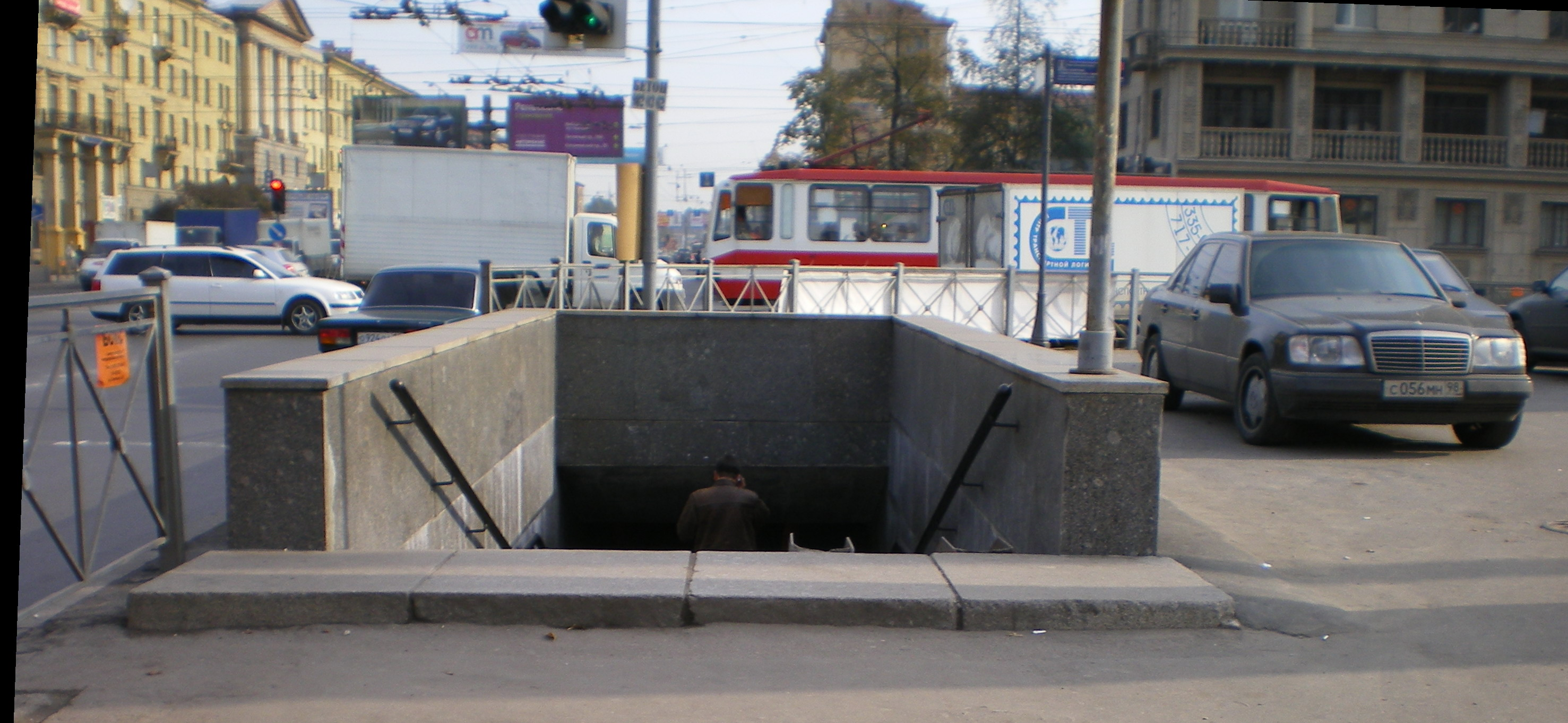
The entrance to a subway in Saint Petersburg

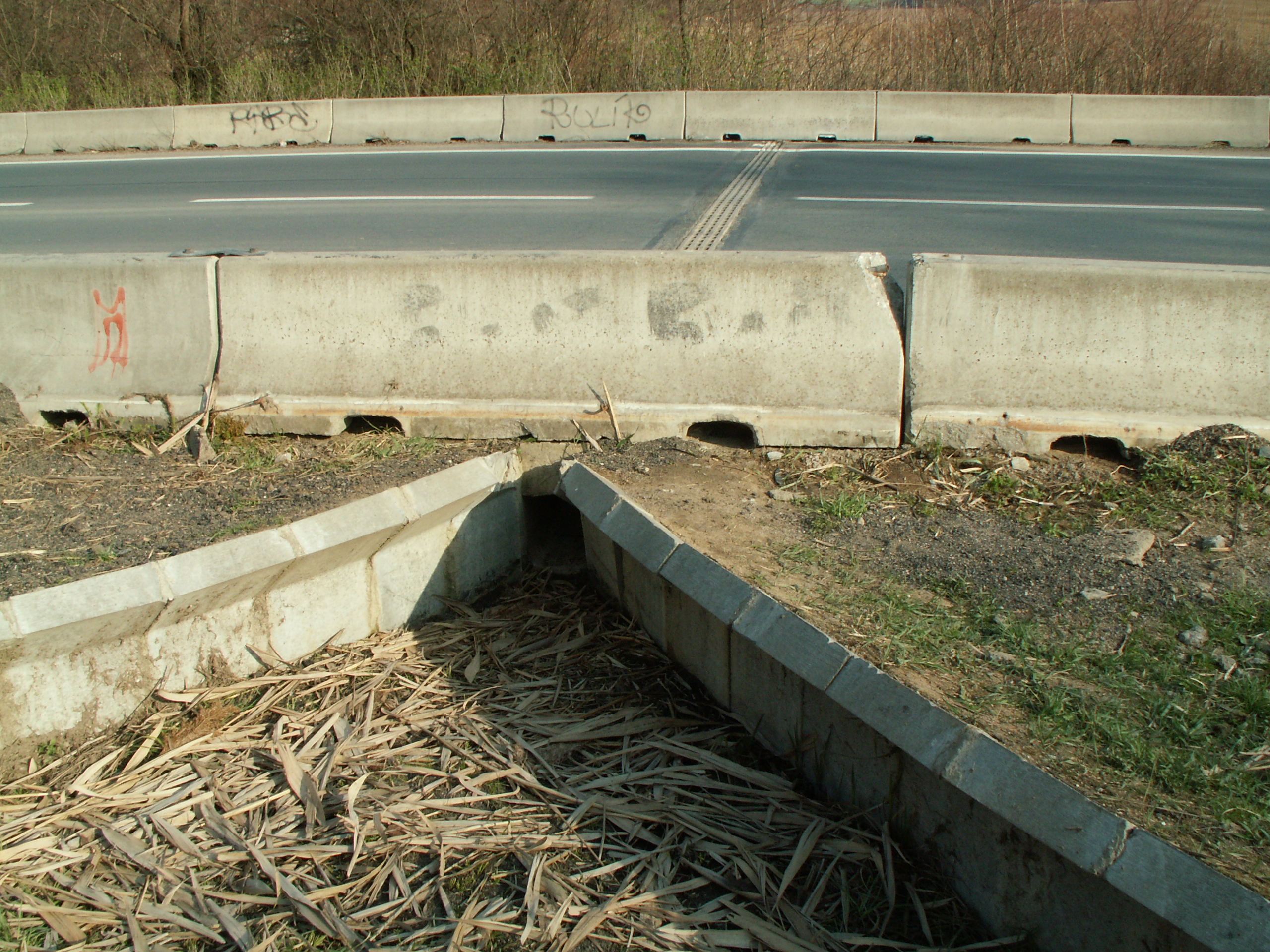
A frog subway

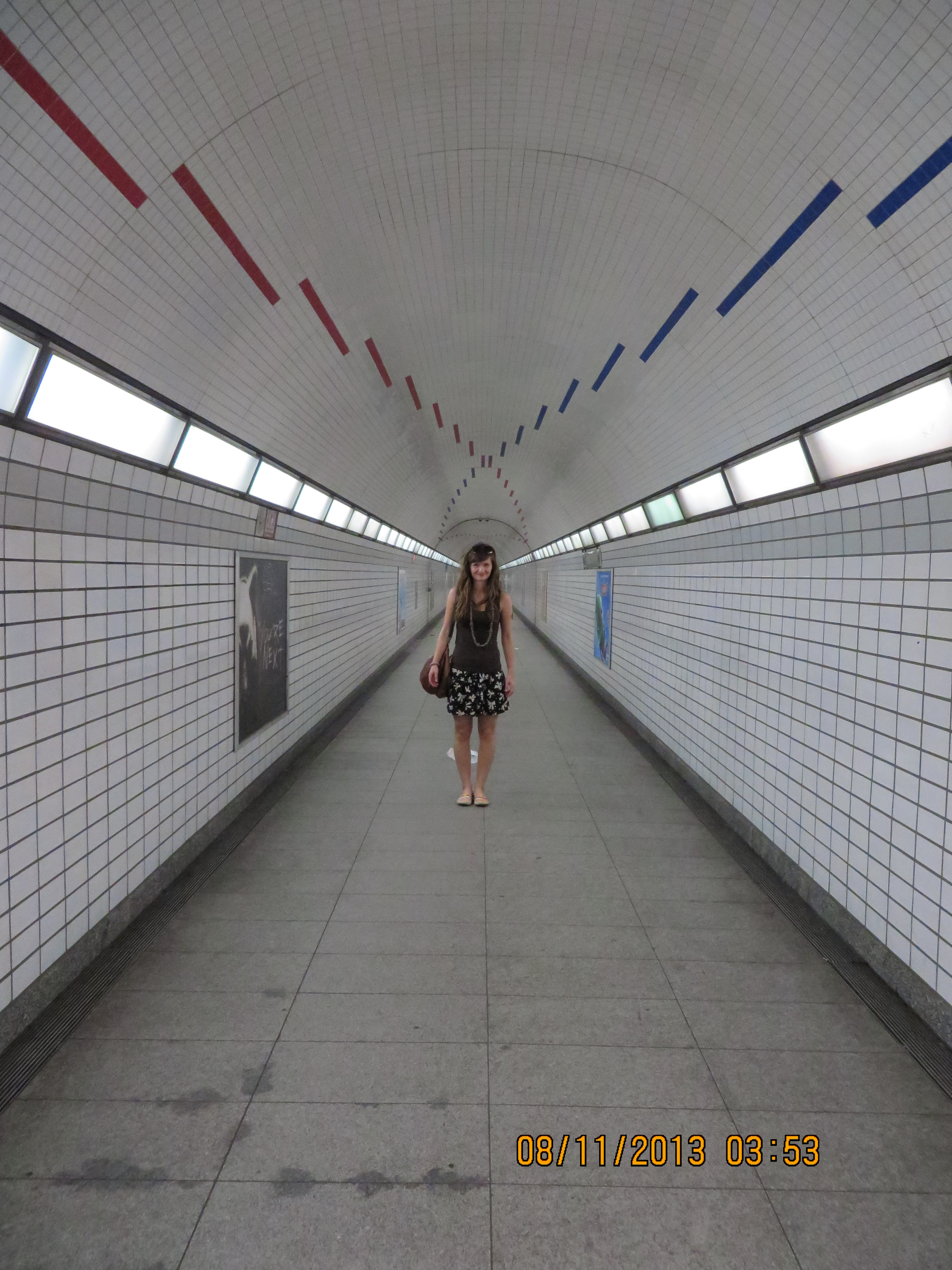
Subway connecting Red and Blue "subway" lines in the Loop area of Chicago

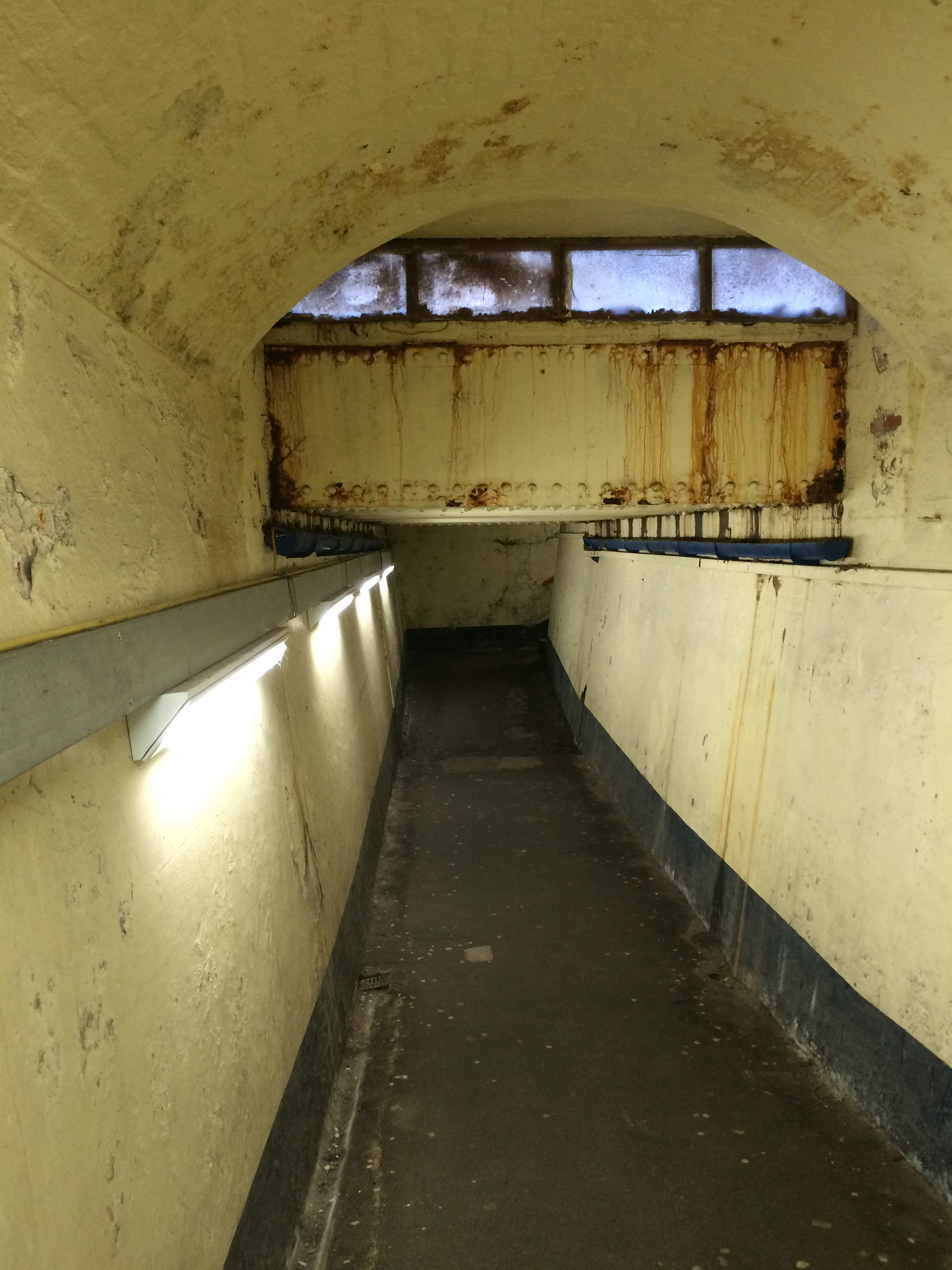
Pedestrian subway under a railway at Godalming in the United Kingdom, built in 1859

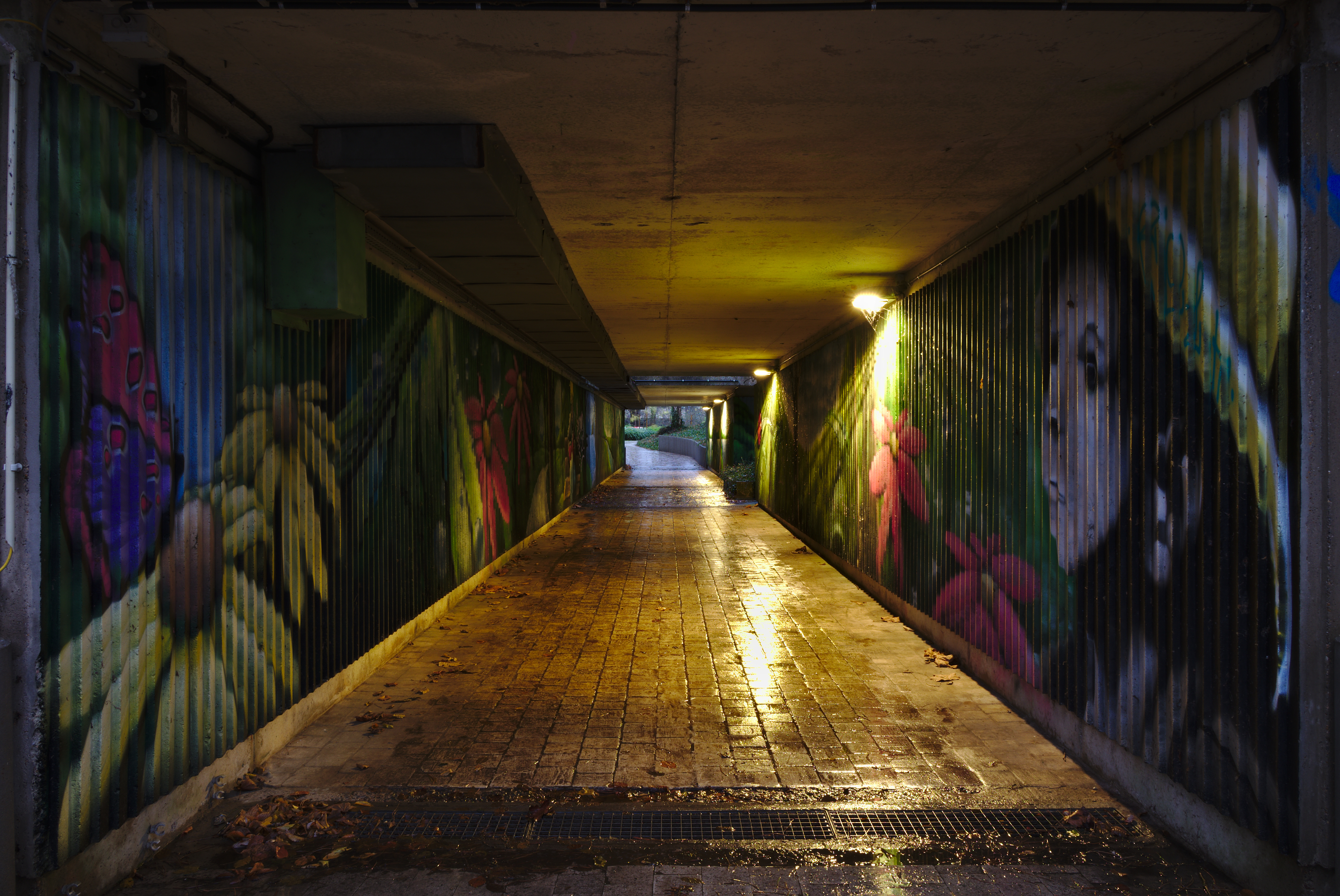
A pedestrian tunnel in Louvain-la-Neuve

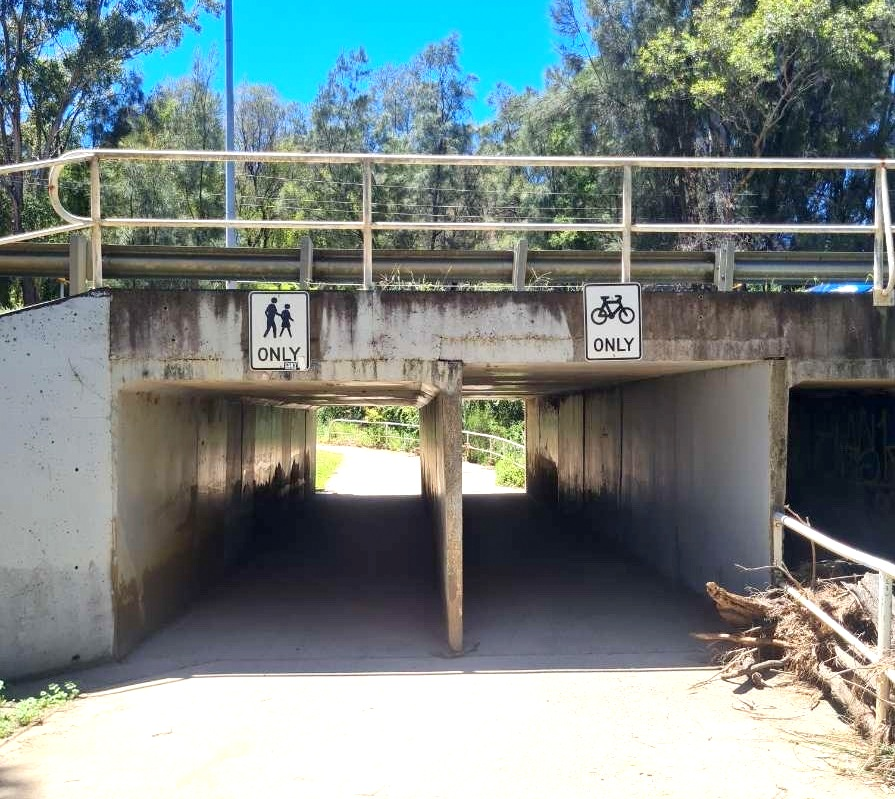
A pedestrian and cyclist subway under a road in Sydney, Australia

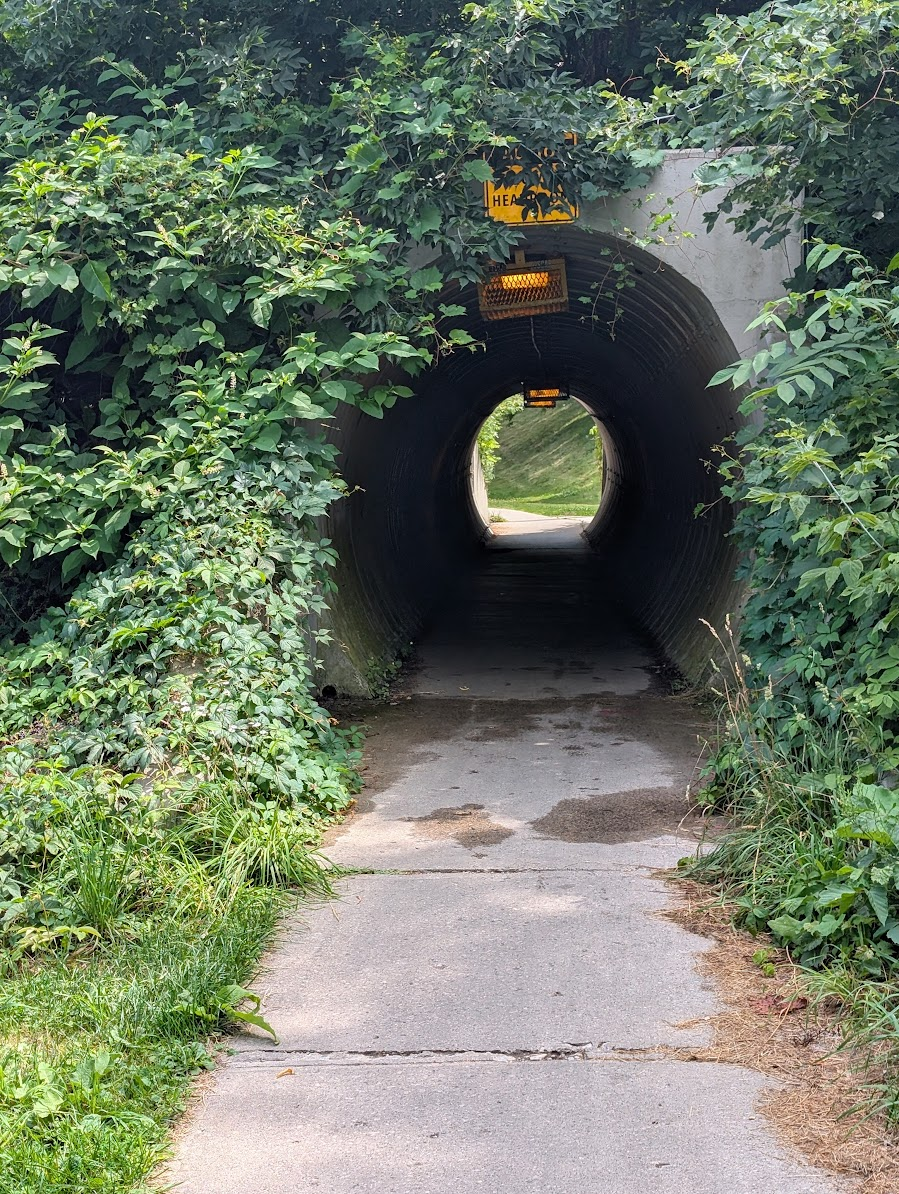
Overgrown plants near a pedestrian tunnel in London Ontario

== See also ==
- Tunnel
