= Stadion Letná =

Football stadium

Letná Stadium
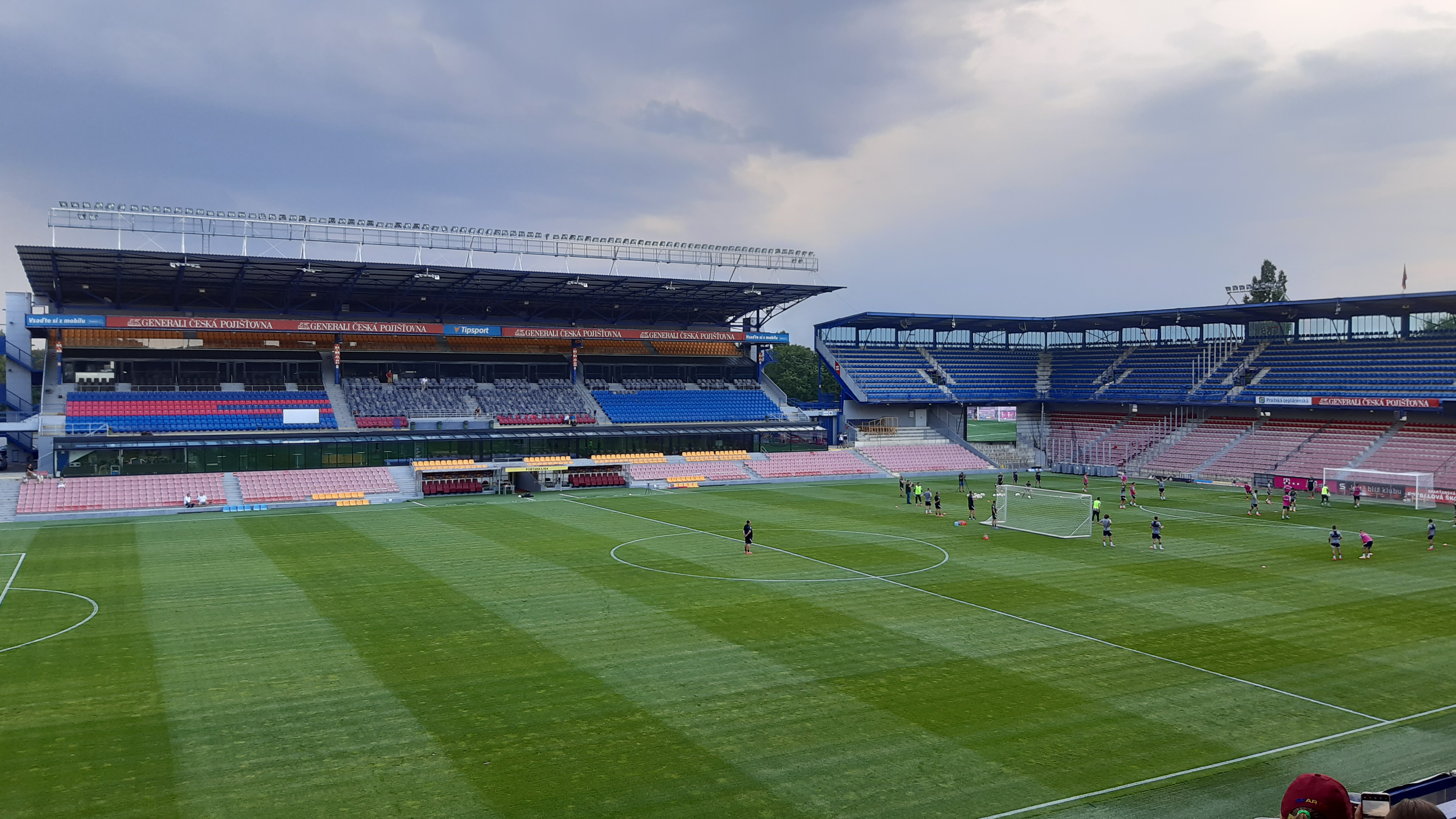
- UEFA
- Interactive map of Letná Stadium
- Former names: Letná Stadium (1917–2003); Toyota Arena (2003–2007); AXA Arena (2007–2009); Generali Arena (2009–2020); Generali Česká pojišťovna Arena (2020–2022) epet ARENA (2022–present)
- Location: Milady Horákové 1066/98; Prague, Czech Republic
- Coordinates: 50°5′59″N 14°24′57″E
- Owner: AC Sparta Praha fotbal, a.s.
- Capacity: 18,357
- Surface: Grass
- Field size: 105×68 m
- Public transit: Sparta (1, 2, 8, 12, 25, 26); C at Vltavská; A at Hradčanská

Construction
- Opened: 1917
- Renovated: 1937, 1969, 1994
- Architects: Cyril Mandel, Vladimír Syrovátka

Tenants
- Sparta Prague (1917–present); Czech Republic national football team (selected matches)

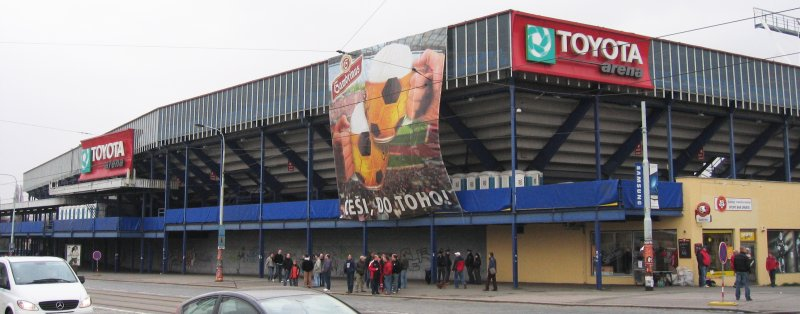
Exterior of the stadium in 2007 when it was named Toyota Arena

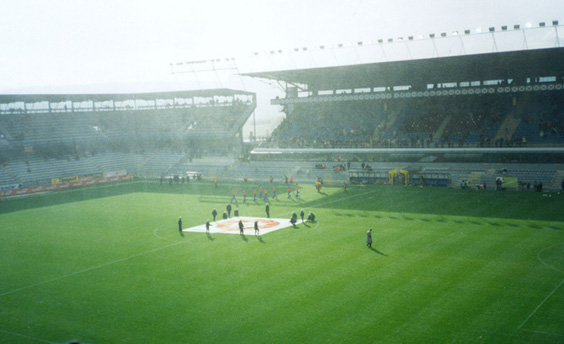
Interior of the Letná Stadium at the start of a game, Nov 2002

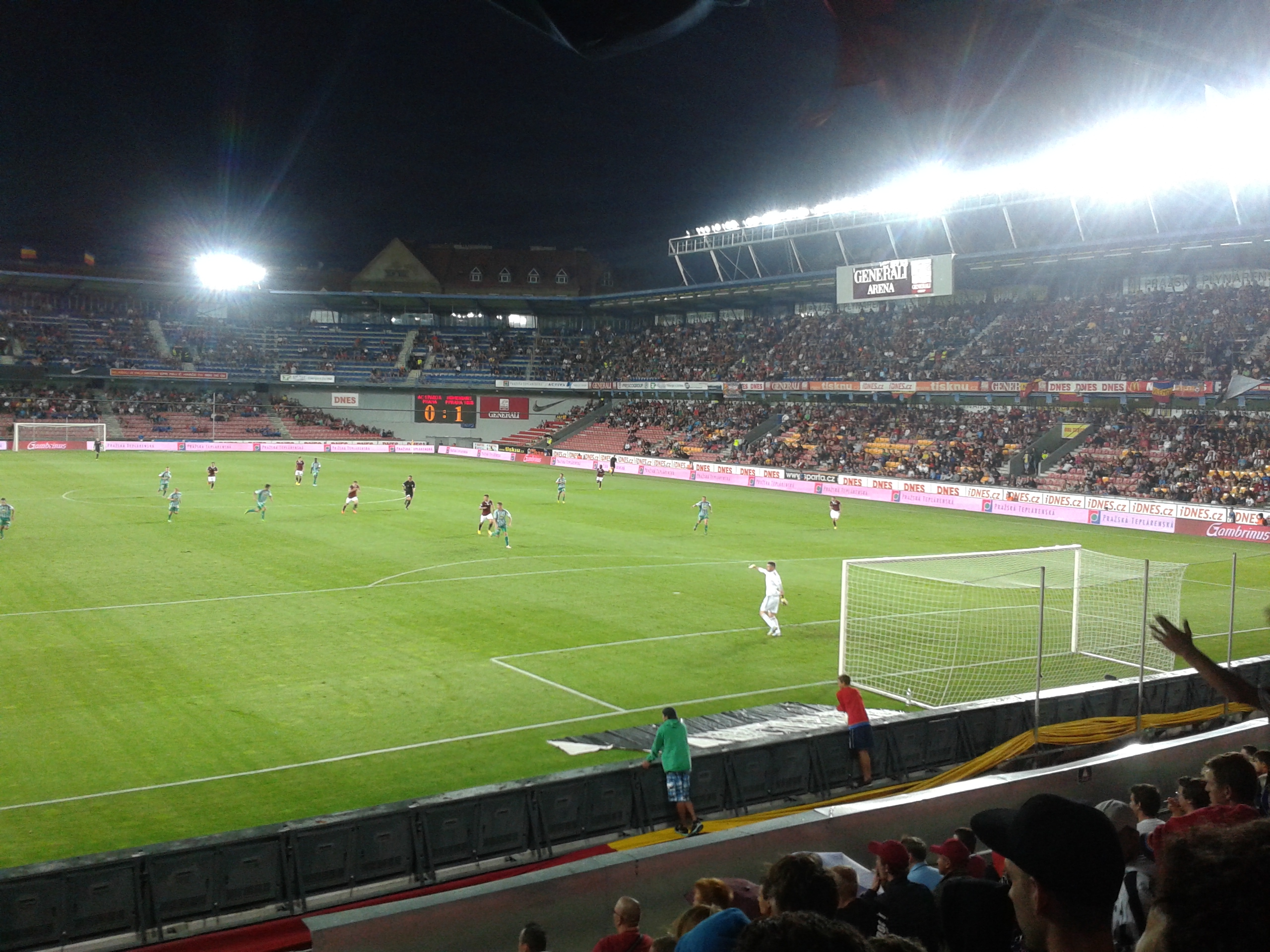
Letná Stadium during an AC Sparta Game

The Letná Stadium (Czech: Stadion Letná [ˈstadjon ˈlɛtnaː]) is a football stadium in Prague. It is the home venue of AC Sparta Prague and often hosts the home matches of the Czech Republic national football team. The stadium's capacity is 18,887 seats.

== History ==
The first wooden stadium at its location opened in 1921. The origins of motorcycle speedway in Prague can be traced back to races held at the stadium, starting on 9 June 1928. It is unknown as to when the track was removed.

In 1930, it hosted the third Women's World Games. The stadium burned in 1934 and a new main reinforced concrete grandstand was built in 1937. In 1969 all the other grandstands were replaced by reinforced concrete ones and capacity was extended to 35,880 spectators. The 1994 reconstruction into its present form saw Letná closed for nine months, until the stadium met all international standards. The running track was removed and all spectator places were now seated.

Letná has frequently hosted international matches, in October 1989 the venue saw a crowd of 34,000 watch home side Czechoslovakia defeat Switzerland in a qualifying match for the 1990 FIFA World Cup. After the dissolution of Czechoslovakia, Letná continued as an international stadium, hosting matches of the Czech Republic national football team from 1995, including qualification matches for UEFA Euro 1996, in which the Czechs defeated the Netherlands and Norway.

The playing surface was renovated in 2001, including the installation of a new under-soil heating and watering system. This necessitated Sparta playing league matches at the end of the 2000–01 season at the nearby Stadion Evžena Rošického.

In 1994, the stadium was reopened after a complete modernization. The capacity was lowered to 20,854 seats. In 2009 major changes took place at the stadium – barriers between sections were removed, two video screens were installed and infrared radiators were installed to heat the eastern stand. The capacity has been 18,887 since 2009.

=== Czech Republic national football team matches ===
Date	Attendance	Home team	Result	Away team	Competition	Match report
26 April 1995	17,463	Czech Republic	3–1	Netherlands	UEFA Euro 1996 Q	Report
6 September 1995	19,522	Czech Republic	2–0	Norway	UEFA Euro 1996 Q	Report
15 November 1995	20,239	Czech Republic	3–0	Luxembourg	UEFA Euro 1996 Q	Report
9 October 1996	19,223	Czech Republic	0–0	Spain	1998 FIFA World Cup Q	Report
2 April 1997	19,137	Czech Republic	1–2	(Federal Republic of Yugoslavia) FR Yugoslavia	1998 FIFA World Cup Q	Report
11 October 1997	5,428	Czech Republic	3–0	Slovakia	1998 FIFA World Cup Q	Report
19 August 1998	7,021	Czech Republic	1–0	Denmark	Friendly	Report
9 June 1999	21,149	Czech Republic	3–2	Scotland	UEFA Euro 2000 Q	Report
9 October 1999	21,362	Czech Republic	2–0	Faroe Islands	UEFA Euro 2000 Q	Report
26 April 2000	4,972	Czech Republic	4–1	Israel	Friendly	Report
28 March 2001	16,354	Czech Republic	0–0	Denmark	2002 FIFA World Cup Q	Report
25 April 2001	4,887	Czech Republic	1–1	Belgium	Friendly	Report
6 October 2001	15,020	Czech Republic	6–0	Bulgaria	2002 FIFA World Cup Q	Report
14 November 2001	18,996	Czech Republic	0–1	Belgium	2002 FIFA World Cup Q (P-O)	Report
18 May 2002	15,077	Czech Republic	1–0	Italy	Friendly	Report
6 September 2002	5,435	Czech Republic	5–0	(Federal Republic of Yugoslavia) FR Yugoslavia	Friendly	Report
2 April 2003	17,150	Czech Republic	4–0	Austria	UEFA Euro 2004 Q	Report
10 September 2003	18,356	Czech Republic	3–1	Netherlands	UEFA Euro 2004 Q	Report
28 April 2004	11,802	Czech Republic	0–1	Japan	Friendly	Report
2 June 2004	6,627	Czech Republic	3–1	Bulgaria	Friendly	Report
9 October 2004	16,028	Czech Republic	1–0	Romania	2006 FIFA World Cup Q	Report
8 October 2005	17,478	Czech Republic	0–2	Netherlands	2006 FIFA World Cup Q	Report
16 November 2005	17,464	Czech Republic	1–0	Norway	2006 FIFA World Cup Q (P-O)	Report
3 June 2006	15,910	Czech Republic	3–0	Trinidad and Tobago	Friendly	Report
15 November 2006	6,852	Czech Republic	1–1	Denmark	Friendly	Report
24 March 2007	17,821	Czech Republic	1–2	Germany	UEFA Euro 2008 Q	Report
12 September 2007	16,648	Czech Republic	1–0	Republic of Ireland	UEFA Euro 2008 Q	Report
17 November 2007	15,651	Czech Republic	3–1	Slovakia	UEFA Euro 2008 Q	Report
30 May 2008	11,314	Czech Republic	3–1	Scotland	Friendly	Report
1 April 2009	14,956	Czech Republic	1–2	Slovakia	2010 FIFA World Cup Q	Report
10 October 2009	14,010	Czech Republic	2–0	Poland	2010 FIFA World Cup Q	Report
6 September 2011	7,322	Czech Republic	4–0	Ukraine	Friendly	Report
7 October 2011	17,873	Czech Republic	0–2	Spain	UEFA Euro 2012 Q	Report
11 November 2011	14,560	Czech Republic	2–0	Montenegro	UEFA Euro 2012 Q (P-O)	Report
1 June 2012	17,102	Czech Republic	1–2	Hungary	Friendly	Report
16 October 2012	16,160	Czech Republic	0–0	Bulgaria	2014 FIFA World Cup Q	Report
7 June 2013	18,235	Czech Republic	0–0	Italy	2014 FIFA World Cup Q	Report
3 September 2014	12,673	Czech Republic	0–1	United States	Friendly	Report
9 September 2014	17,946	Czech Republic	2–1	Netherlands	UEFA Euro 2016 Q	Report
10 October 2015	17,190	Czech Republic	0–2	Turkey	UEFA Euro 2016 Q	Report
24 March 2016	14,580	Czech Republic	0–1	Scotland	Friendly	Report
4 September 2016	10,731	Czech Republic	0–0	Northern Ireland	2018 FIFA World Cup Q	Report
7 June 2019	13,482	Czech Republic	2–1	Bulgaria	UEFA Euro 2020 Q	Report
14 October 2019	9,139	Czech Republic	2–3	Northern Ireland	Friendly	Report
8 June 2021	1,351	Czech Republic	3–1	Albania	Friendly	Report
16 November 2021	10,076	Czech Republic	2–0	Estonia	2022 FIFA World Cup Q	Report¨
26 March 2024	16,158	Czech Republic	2–1	Armenia	Friendly	Report
11 October 2024	17,823	Czech Republic	2–0	Albania	2024–25 UEFA Nations League	Report¨
31 March 2026	18,215	Czech Republic	2–2 (3–1 pen.)	Denmark	2026 FIFA World Cup Q	Report¨
12 November 2026		Czech Republic	–	Spain	2026–27 UEFA Nations League	

== Development of the name ==
- 1917–2003: Letná Stadium
- 2003–2007: Toyota Arena
- 2007–2009: AXA Arena
- 2009–2020: Generali Arena
- 2020–2022: Generali Česká pojišťovna Arena
- September 2022–November 2022: Letná Stadium
- November 2022–present: epet ARENA

== Non-football activities ==
Since the beginning the stadium has been used as a speaking tribune for events that took place in front of it, in/around the Milada Horaková street and the large "Letná Plain". During the Velvet revolution in 1989, some 800,000 people assembled for anti-government demonstrations at the Letná plain. The speaking tribune was later removed.

== Transport connections ==
The stadium is served by the tram lines 1, 2, 8, 12, 25 and 26. The tram stop Sparta is in front of the stadium in Milada Horáková Street. The nearest metro stations are Vltavská to the east and Hradčanská to the west.

== See also ==
- List of football stadiums in the Czech Republic
- Lists of stadiums
