= Praha-Bubeneč railway station =

Railway station in Bubeneč, Czech Republic

Praha-Bubeneč
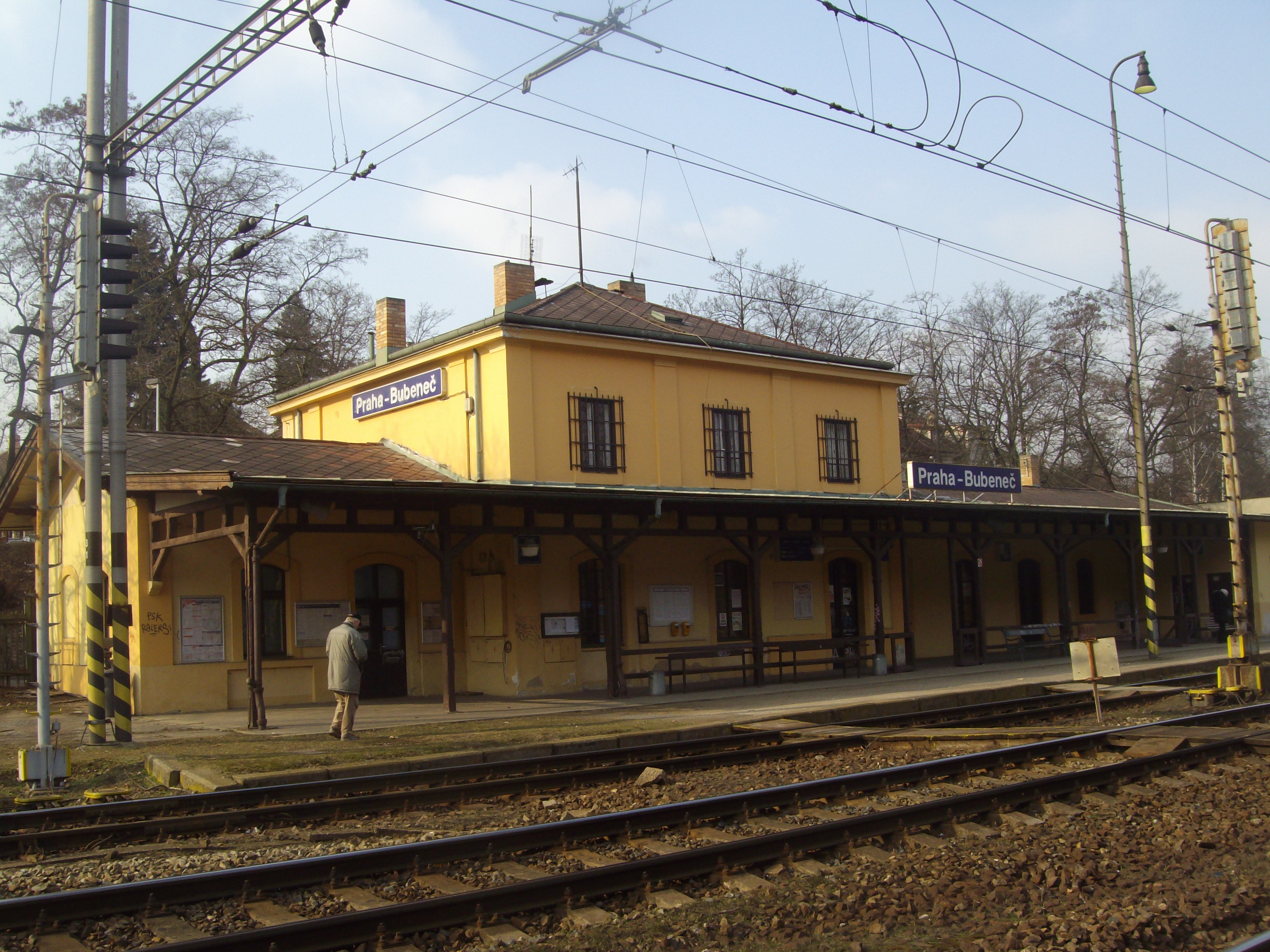
- Praha-Bubeneč station

General information
- Coordinates: 50°6′27″N 14°24′16″E
- Owner: Správa železnic
- Line: 090, 091

Other information
- Station code: 54570267

History
- Opened: 1850
- Closed: 2014
Location

Praha-Bubeneč railway station (Czech: Nádraží Praha-Bubeneč) is a former railway station located in Prague 6 in the district of Bubeneč. The station now serves as a passing loop on tracks 090 and 091.

The station was constructed in 1850 as the second station building in the Prague area (after Praha Masarykovo nádraží) and took the name Praha-Bubeneč in 1942. The station closed on 28 August 2014, due to the opening of the Praha-Podbaba railway station close by. The trains continue to pass through the station and the building remains untouched, but no trains stop at this station anymore. It was announced in August 2020 that the station will be transformed into a new community center called Stanice 6, with work to begin in spring of 2021.

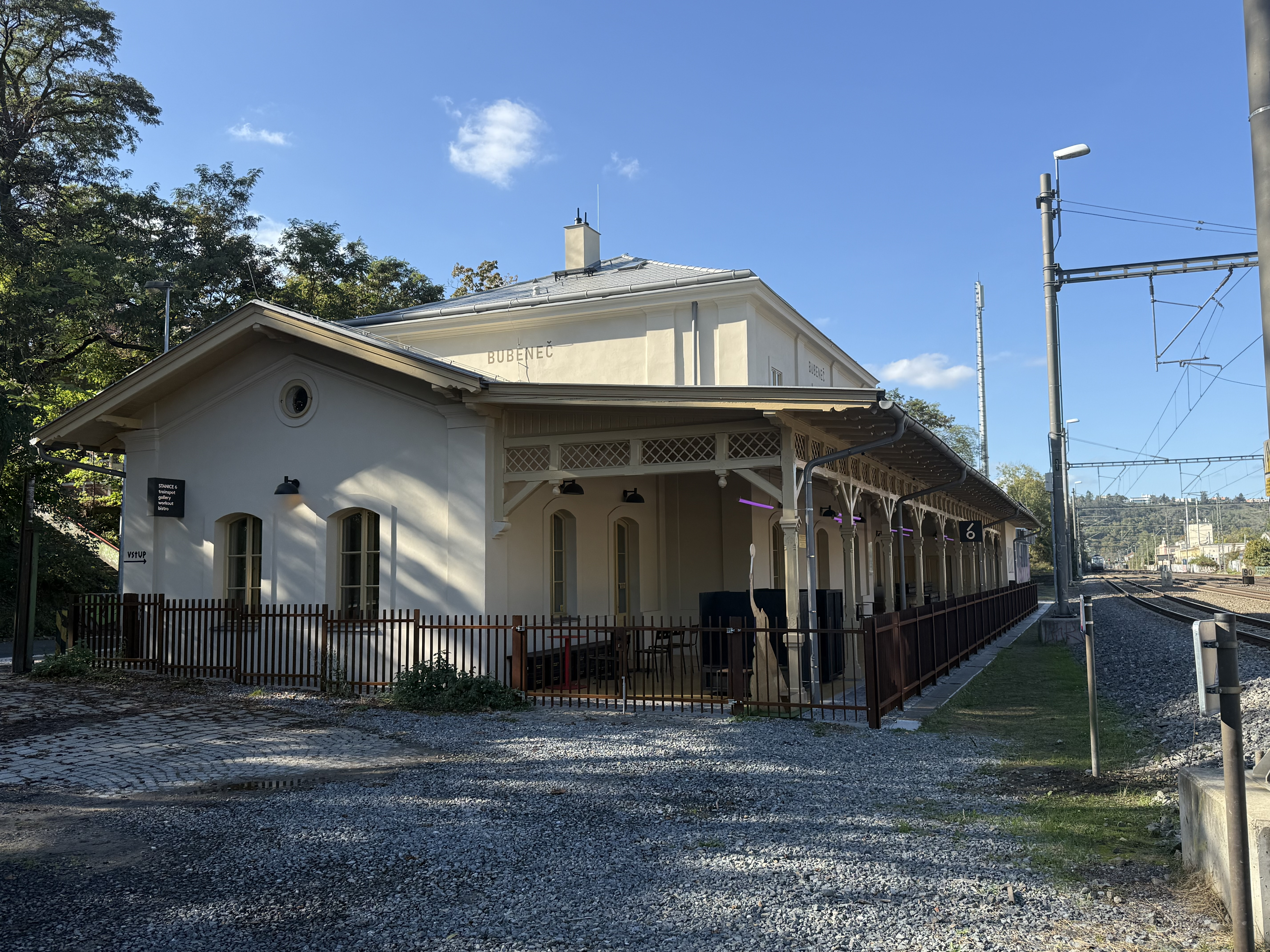
Stanice 6 – Pub and Community Centre
