= Praha-Podbaba railway station =

Railway station in Prague, Czech Republic

Praha-Podbaba
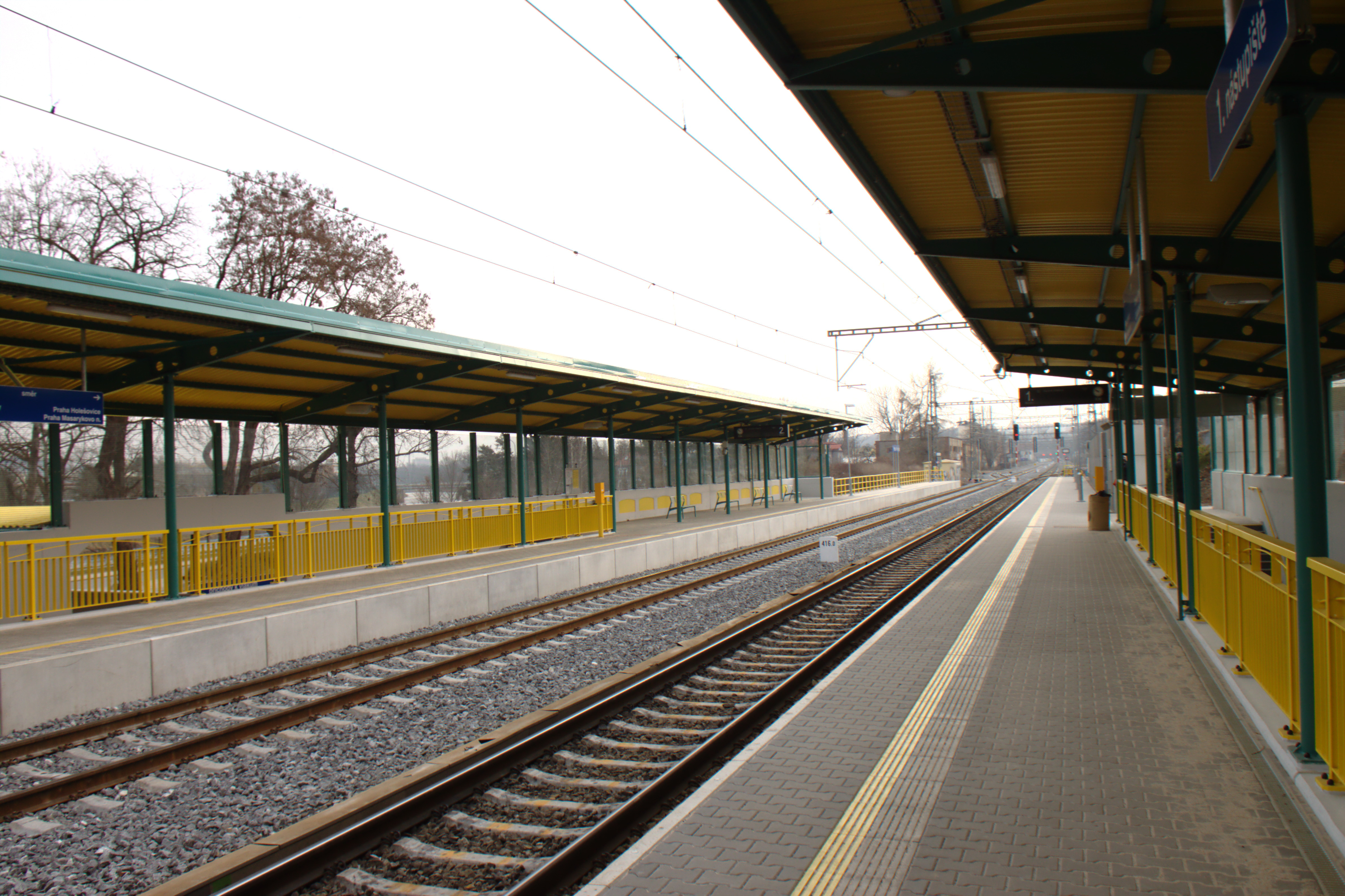
- Praha-Podbaba railway station

General information
- Coordinates: 50°06′45″N 14°23′44″E
- Owner: Správa železnic

History
- Opened: 29 August 2014
Location

Praha-Podbaba is a railway halt (Czech: zastávka) located in Bubeneč in Prague 6. It lies on the railway line from Prague to Děčín, and was opened in 2014 to replace the closed Praha-Bubeneč railway station a short distance south down the line. It is served by fast trains from Prague to Děčín as well as local services integrated into the Esko Prague system. It is connected to Prague's tram network and to local buses.

The station was built along with the extension of a tram line completed in 2011, which extended the line a short distance north of its previous terminus to create an interchange next to the railway line. It was opened on 29 August 2014.

A previous halt named Podbaba, later changed to Praha-Podbaba, existed on the same railway line between 1867 and 1949, a short distance further north from the current station.

== Services ==
Preceding station	Esko Prague	Following station
Praha-Holešovice towards Praha hl.n.	R4 switch	Roztoky u Prahy towards Děčín hl.n.
Praha-Bubny towards Praha hl.n.	S4 switch	Praha-Sedlec towards Kralupy nad Vltavou or Hněvice
