= Vltavská (Prague Metro) =

Prague metro station

Vltavská C
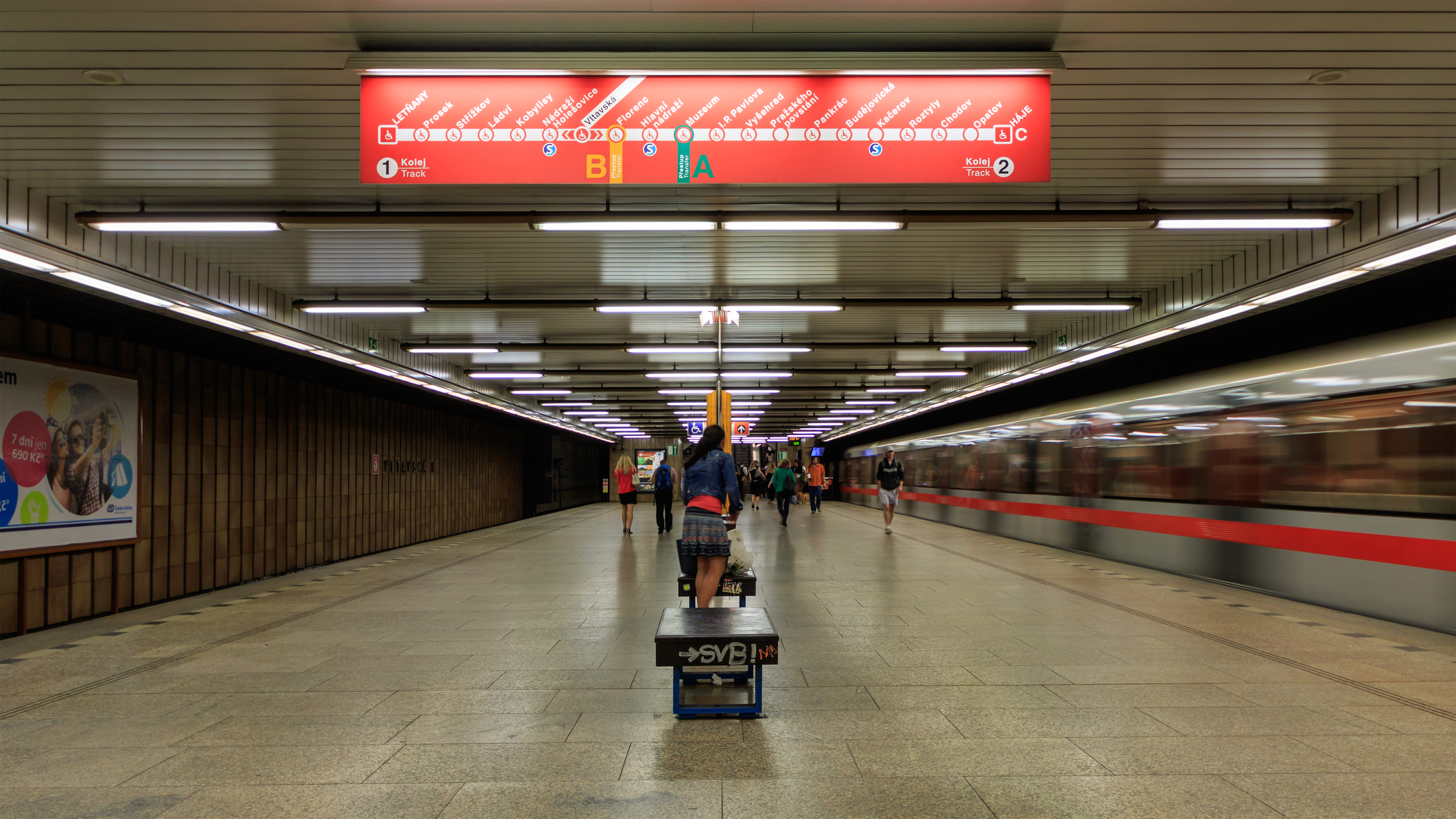
- Vltavská metro station

General information
- Location: Bubenská; Prague 7 - Holešovice; Prague; Czech Republic
- Coordinates: 50.099°N 14.438°E
- System: Prague Metro station
- Owner: Dopravní podnik hl. m. Prahy
- Line: C
- Platforms: Island platform
- Tracks: 2
- Connections: Praha-Bubny S4, S5, S54, R24, R45; 1, 5, 18, 20, 25 156

Construction
- Structure type: Underground
- Depth: 20.75 m (68.1 ft)
- Platform levels: 1
- Cycle facilities: No
- Accessible: Yes

History
- Opened: 3 November 1984

Services
Preceding station	Prague Metro	Following station
Nádraží Holešovice toward Letňany	Line C	Florenc toward Háje
Location
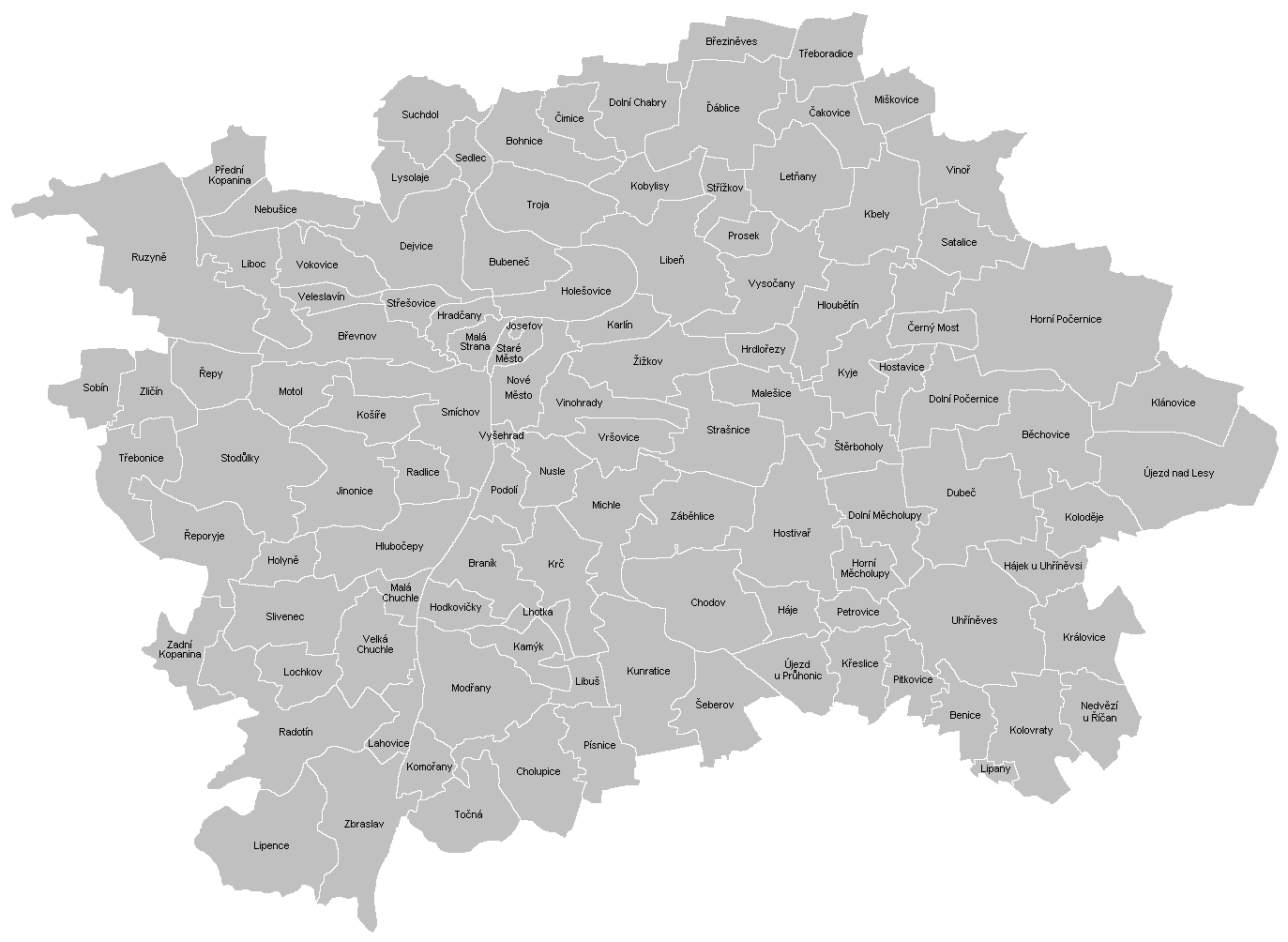
- Location within Prague Location within Greater Prague Location within Czech Republic

Vltavská (Czech pronunciation: [ˈvl̩tafskaː]) is a Prague Metro station on Line C, located in Holešovice, Prague 7. The station was opened on 3 November 1984 as part of the extension from Sokolovská (later renamed Florenc) to Fučíkova (later renamed Nádraží Holešovice). It is located nearby Strossmayer Square, and there are tram stations of the same name above the station.

The Praha-Bubny railway station is located near this metro station.

== Culture ==
In 2018, complex of the station Vltavská appeared on Apple Inc.'s commercial for the iPhone XR, among other Prague modern and brutalist buildings.

== Construction ==
Vltavská is a cut-and-cover station, built in an open excavation secured by anchored pile walls. It is one of the deepest stations on Line C (and was the deepest until 2004), located 20.75 meters below ground. Given the standard practice in the construction and design of Prague Metro stations, this solution is unusual; typically, stations at this depth are built using the cut-and-cover method (such as Želivského). The complex conditions and the effort to ensure design consistency along Line C thus led the station’s architects and designers to the current solution.

The space between the platform and ground level has not gone to waste; spread across a total of four floors, there are some three hundred rooms, many of which are used by the Prague Emergency Medical Service, among others. A large portion of the space is also occupied by parking spaces.

More precisely, the Vltavská platform is located beneath the southwestern part of the Praha-Bubny railway station (it was precisely this section that had to be closed in 1978 due to subway construction; however, since the complete demolition of this railway station had been planned, it was not later restored). Only the southern exit was completed, leading from the platform via three-arm Transporta escalators (replaced and narrowed in 2003 so that one arm could be converted into a platform for people with disabilities) to a shallow concourse. In 2005, an inclined elevator and an elevator from the vestibule to street level were built next to the escalators. In addition to providing access to street level, this also allows for transfers to the tram system.

The wall cladding in the platform area consists of natural ceramic tiles, which were also used on Section II.C and later on Section III.B. Brass strips are placed between them.

== History ==
Between 1978 and 1984, 198 million Kčs were spent on its construction. Passengers were able to tour the station during construction; open house events were held in June 1981 and July 1982.

Vltavská was one of the stations hardest hit during the 2002 floods, mainly because water entered directly from the street level through the concourse. For this reason, certain modifications were made during the renovation to prevent a similar situation from recurring. These included, for example, replacing the glass panels at the exits leading to tram stops with brick walls, as well as the option to close off these exits with movable walls. These walls can also be erected around the main vestibule building.

== The Future ==
It is expected that with the planned construction of the new Praha-Bubny neighborhood—and the associated modernization of the railway line toward Kladno (Line 120)—the area surrounding the station, as well as the station itself, will undergo modifications. According to an instructional video by Správa železnic, plans include the construction of a northern concourse and an underpass connecting the metro station to the train station, as well as the relocation of tram tracks to improve the connection between rail and public transit.
