= Praha-Holešovice railway station =

Railway station in Holešovice, Czech Republic

Praha-Holešovice
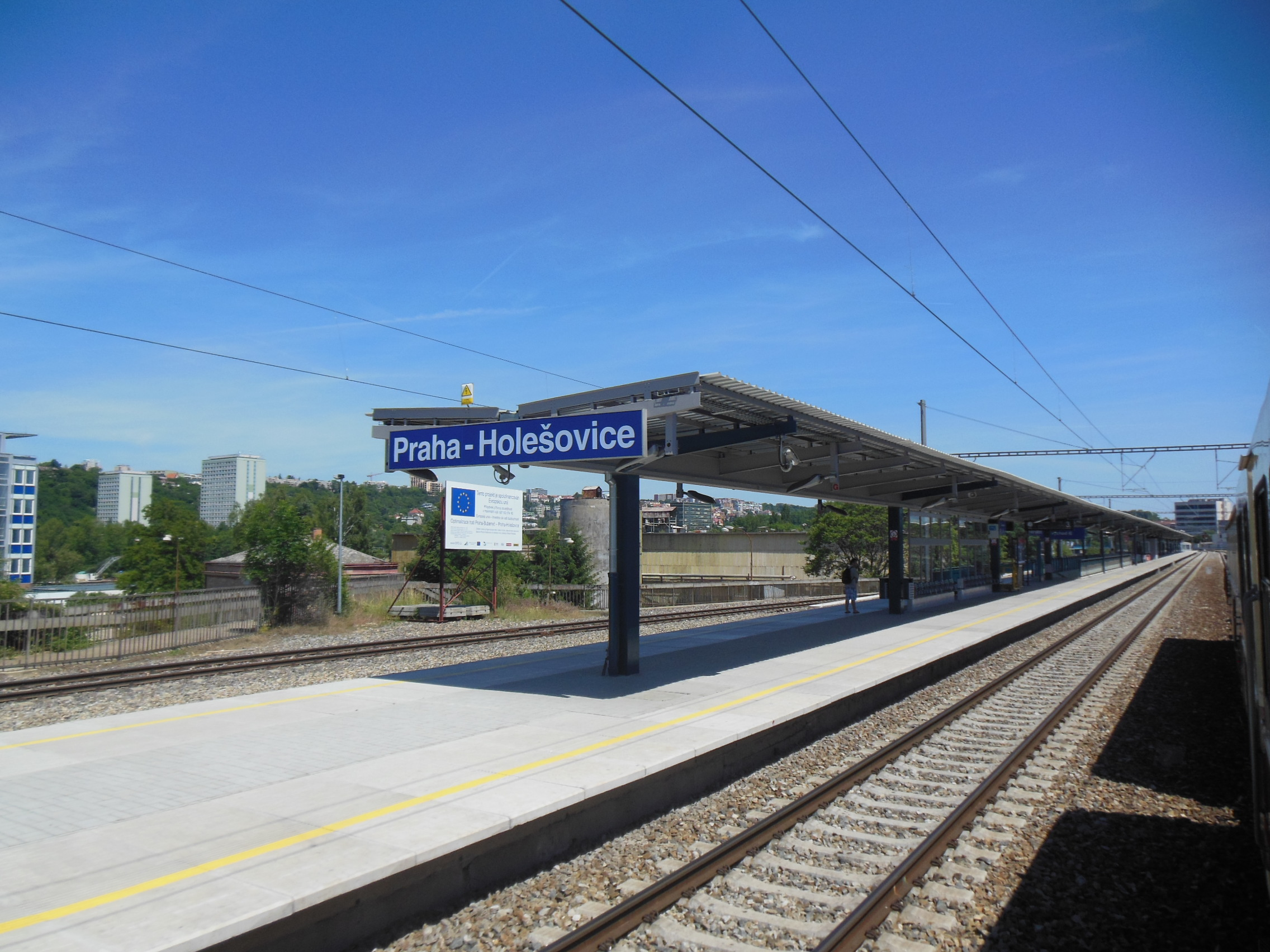
- Station platforms at Praha-Holešovice

General information
- Location: Czech Republic
- Coordinates: 50.11064°N 14.43971°E
- Lines: 090 (Praha –) Kralupy nad Vltavou – Ústí nad Labem (– Děčín); 091 Praha-Hostivař – Kralupy nad Vltavou
- Train operators: České dráhy, RegioJet
- Connections: C Line C: Nádraží Holešovice

History
- Opened: 1985

Services
Preceding station	České dráhy	Following station
Ústí nad Labem hl.n. towards Hamburg-Altona, Kiel Hbf or København H	Railjet	Praha hl.n. Terminus
Ústí nad Labem hl.n. towards Hamburg-Altona, Flensburg, Kiel Hbf or Berlin Hbf	EC	Praha hl.n. Terminus
Praha hl.n. Terminus	R	Ústí nad Labem hl.n. towards Chomutov or Cheb
Preceding station	Esko Prague	Following station
Praha hl.n. Terminus	S4	Praha-Podbaba towards Kralupy nad Vltavou or Hněvice
Praha-Libeň towards Praha-Hostivař	S49	Praha-Podbaba towards Roztoky u Prahy
Praha hl.n. Terminus	R20	Praha-Podbaba towards Ústí nad Labem hl.n. or Děčín hl.n.
Praha hl.n. Terminus	R44	Praha-Podbaba towards Roudnice nad Labem or Slaný
Terminus	R49	Praha hl.n. towards Tábor
Location

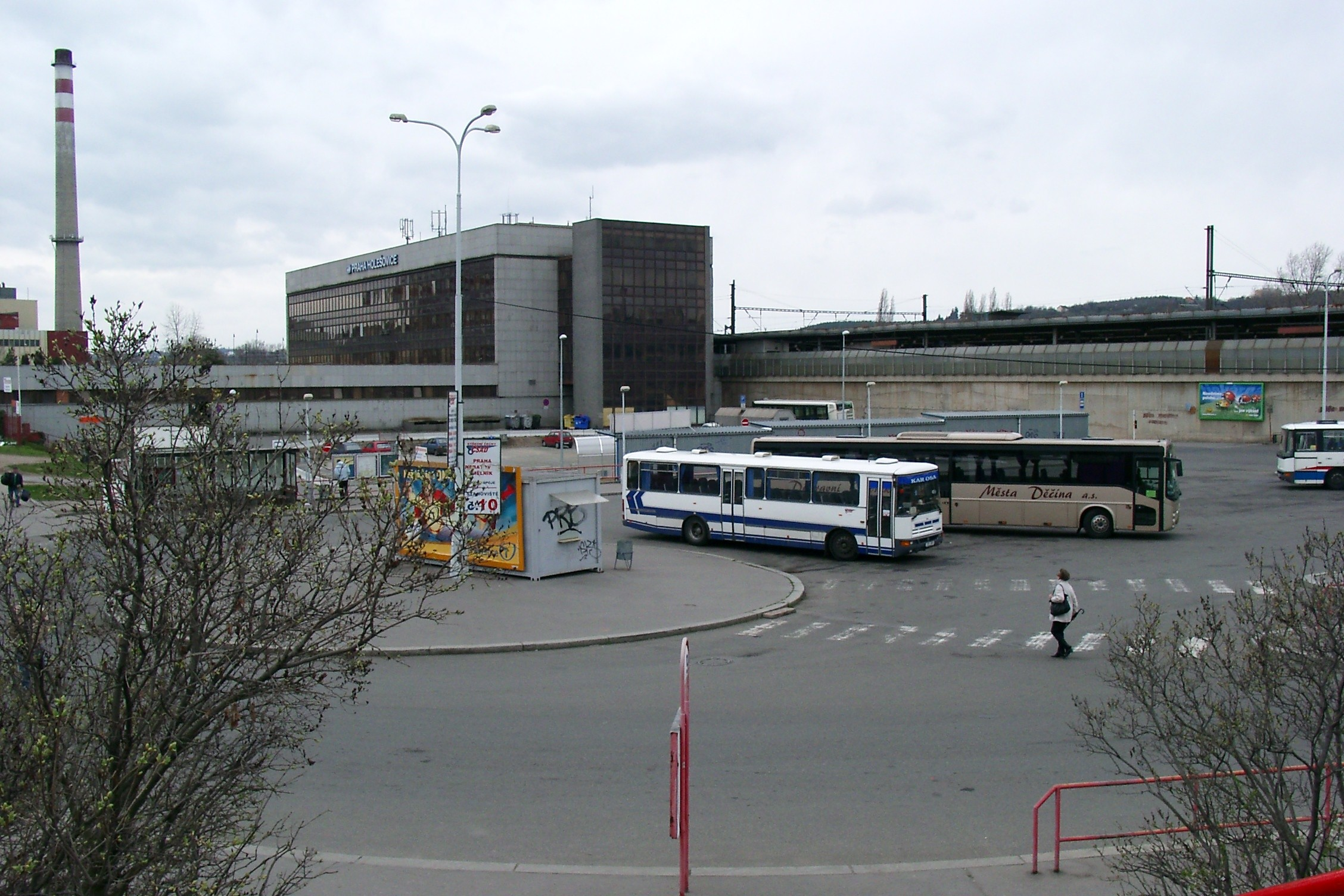
Exterior, showing the adjacent bus station

Praha-Holešovice railway station (Czech: Nádraží Praha-Holešovice) is located in Holešovice, a northern district of Prague, capital city of the Czech Republic. Opened in 1985, the station was originally used as a terminus for international fast trains coming from the east. Since the completion of the Nové spojení ("new connection") in 2010, however, these trains terminate at the more central hub, Praha hlavní nádraží. Nevertheless, international trains from hlavní nádraží running north to Dresden and Berlin, as well as northwest-bound inter-regional trains still call here. The station is adjacent to Prague Metro's Nádraží Holešovice station on line C and also to stops of the same name on lines 6, 12, and 17 of the city's tramway system, as well as a bus station.
