= Invalidovna (Prague Metro) =

Prague metro station

Coordinates: 50°05′48″N 14°27′47″E

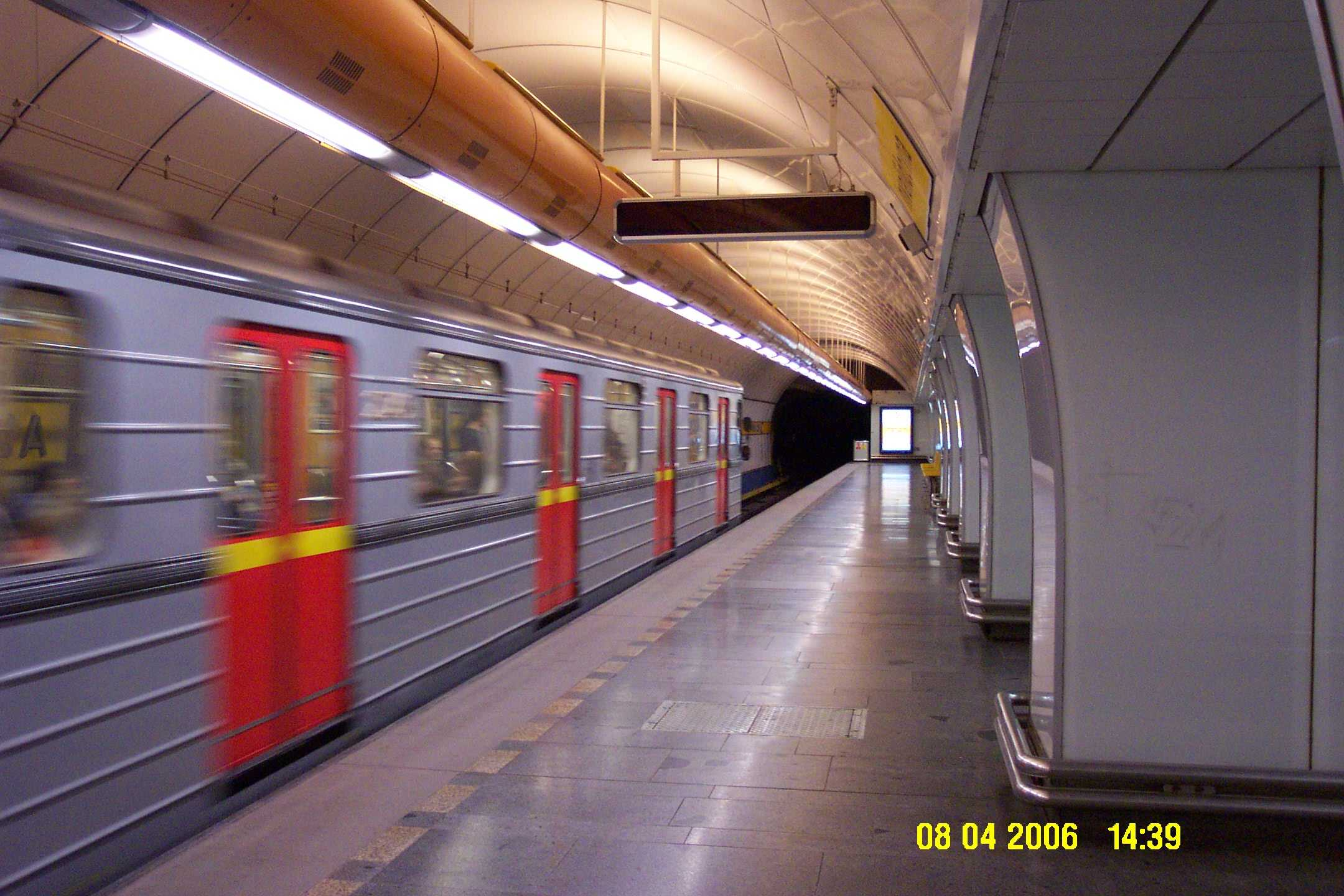

General information
- Location: Sokolovská street Karlín, Prague 8 Prague; Czech Republic
- System: Prague Metro
- Platforms: 1 island platform
- Tracks: 2
- Connections: tram: 3, 8, 12, 24; Night transit: 92,94

Construction
- Structure type: Underground
- Depth: 20 m (66 ft)

Other information
- Fare zone: PID: Prague

History
- Opened: 22 November 1990; 35 years ago

Services
Preceding station	Prague Metro	Following station
Křižíkova toward Zličín	Line B	Palmovka toward Černý Most
Location

Invalidovna (Czech pronunciation: [ˈʔɪnvalɪdovna]) is a Prague Metro station on Line B, located in Karlín, Prague 8. The station was opened on 22 November 1990 as part of the extension from Florenc to Českomoravská. It currently lies along the extension from Florenc to Černý Most.

== See also ==
- Invalidovna
