= List of Prague Metro stations =

Prague Metro lines and stations

The following is a list of Prague Metro stations, ordered alphabetically. Names in parentheses denote former station names from before 1990. The accessibility of the station for persons with impaired mobility and important places nearby are also given.

== Lines ==
The green Line A connects the center with the northwest and east of the city. It is 10 kilometres (6.2 miles) long and has 17 stations. Travel time (from terminal to terminal) is about 20 minutes.

The yellow Line B is the longest; it goes from the southwest outskirts through the center and continues to the northeast of the city. It is 25.6 kilometres (15.9 miles) long and has 24 stations. Travel time (from end to end) is about 45 minutes.

The red Line C is the oldest and shallowest, going from the north to the south-east. It is 14 kilometres (8.7 miles) long and has 20 stations. Travel time is about 35 minutes.

== Stations ==
Name	Photo	District	Named after	Line	Opened	Notes
Anděl (Moskevská)		Smíchov	a building named "U zlatého anděla" ("At a golden angel" in English)	B	November 2, 1985	formerly Moskevská, after Moscow
Bořislavka		Červený vrch	the surrounding suburb	A	April 6, 2015	
Budějovická		Krč	the nearby square	C	May 9, 1974	
Černý Most		Černý Most	the surrounding district	B	November 8, 1998	means Black Bridge in English; Located above-ground with side platforms
Českomoravská		Vysočany	the major street nearby	B	November 22, 1990	the original planned name was Zápotockého (or Antonína Zápotockého), after Antonín Zápotocký
Chodov (Budovatelů)		Jižní Město	the surrounding suburb	C	November 11, 1980	formerly Budovatelů
Dejvická (Leninova)		Dejvice	the surrounding suburb	A	August 12, 1978	formerly Leninova, after Vladimir Lenin
Depo Hostivař		Strašnice	the metro depot	A	May 26, 2006	
Flora		Vinohrady, Žižkov	the local name of the surrounding area	A	December 19, 1980	
Florenc (Sokolovská)		Karlín	a nearby intersection	BC	May 9, 1974 C November 2, 1985 B	formerly Sokolovská located at the central bus station
Háje (Kosmonautů)		Jižní Město	the surrounding suburb	C	November 11, 1980	formerly Kosmonautů
Hlavní nádraží		New Town	Prague central station	C	May 9, 1974	Has side platforms as it was originally built for trams located at the main train station
Hloubětín		Hloubětín	the surrounding district	B	June 8, 1999	
Hradčanská		Dejvice	Hradčany	A	August 12, 1978	located close to the Prague Castle
Hůrka		Nové Butovice	—	B	November 11, 1994	
I.P.Pavlova		Vinohrady	Ivan Pavlov	C	May 9, 1974	
Invalidovna		Karlín	Invalidovna	B	November 22, 1990	the original planned name was Hakenova after Josef Haken, chairman of Communist Party of Czechoslovakia
Jinonice (Švermova)		Jinonice	the surrounding district	B	October 26, 1988	formerly Švermova, after Jan Šverma
Jiřího z Poděbrad		Vinohrady	George of Poděbrady	A	December 19, 1980	
Kačerov		Krč, Michle	the local name of the surrounding area	C	May 9, 1974	
Karlovo náměstí		New Town	the nearby square	B	November 2, 1985	
Kobylisy		Kobylisy	the surrounding district	C	June 26, 2004	
Kolbenova		Vysočany	Emil Kolben	B	June 26, 2001	
Křižíkova		Karlín	František Křižík	B	November 22, 1990	
Ládví		Kobylisy	a nearby hill	C	June 26, 2004	
Letňany		Letňany	the surrounding district	C	May 8, 2008	
Luka		Lužiny	the local name of the surrounding area	B	November 11, 1994	
Lužiny		Lužiny	the surrounding district	B	November 11, 1994	
Malostranská		Malá Strana	the surrounding district	A	August 12, 1978	
Můstek		New Town	The former medieval bridge (Můstek is the diminutive form of most, meaning "bridge") over the old town moat; the remains of the bridge can be seen at the station entrance.	AB	August 12, 1978 A November 2, 1985 B	located under Wenceslas Square
Muzeum		New Town	the National Museum	AC	May 9, 1974 C August 12, 1978 A	located at the top of the Wenceslas Square
Nádraží Holešovice (Fučíkova)		Holešovice	Praha-Holešovice railway station	C	November 3, 1984	formerly Fučíkova, after Julius Fučík
Nádraží Veleslavín		Veleslavín	Praha-Veleslavín railway station	A	April 6, 2015	offers bus link to the Václav Havel Airport Prague
Náměstí Míru		Vinohrady	the nearby square	A	August 12, 1978	means Square of Peace in English
Náměstí Republiky		New Town	the nearby square	B	November 2, 1985	located near the Old Town Square and the Jewish Town
Národní třída		New Town	the National Theater	B	November 2, 1985	Closed and refurbished between 2012 - 2014
Nemocnice Motol		Motol	Motol Hospital	A	April 6, 2015	
Nové Butovice (Dukelská)		Nové Butovice	the surrounding district	B	October 26, 1988	formerly Dukelská, named after the bitterly contested WW2 battle in Dukla Pass
Opatov (Družby)		Jižní Město	the surrounding suburb	C	November 11, 1980	formerly Družby
Palmovka		Libeň	a nearby intersection	B	November 22, 1990	
Pankrác (Mládežnická)		Nusle	the surrounding suburb	C	May 9, 1974	formerly Mládežnická
Petřiny		Petřiny	the surrounding district	A	April 6, 2015	
Pražského povstání		Nusle	the Prague Uprising	C	May 9, 1974	
Prosek		Prosek	the surrounding district	C	May 8, 2008	Side platforms
Radlická		Radlice	the surrounding district	B	October 26, 1988	
Rajská zahrada		Černý Most	a former nearby orchard	B	November 8, 1998	means Paradise Garden in English; Side platforms unorthodox design (trains are on a different level); Czech Construction of the Year for 1999
Roztyly (Primátora Vacka)		Jižní Město, Chodov	surrounding suburb	C	November 11, 1980	formerly Primátora Vacka, after Václav Vacek
Skalka		Strašnická	a nearby housing estate	A	November 4, 1990	means Rockery in English
Smíchovské nádraží		Smíchov	Praha-Smíchov railway station	B	November 2, 1985	
Staroměstská		Old Town	the surrounding district	A	August 12, 1978	located near the Old Town Square, the Jewish Town and Charles Bridge
Stodůlky		Stodůlky	the surrounding district	B	November 11, 1994	
Strašnická		Strašnice	the surrounding district	A	November 11, 1987	
Střížkov		Střížkov	the surrounding district	C	May 8, 2008	
Vltavská		Holešovice	the Vltava river	C	November 3, 1984	
Vyšehrad (Gottwaldova)		Nusle	Vyšehrad fortress, castle and cemetery	C	May 9, 1974	formerly Gottwaldova, after Klement Gottwald; Side platforms partially in a tunnel, partially on a viaduct, due to being built through a cliff face running perpendicular to the line.
Vysočanská		Vysočany	the surrounding district	B	November 8, 1998	
Želivského		Olšany	Jan Želivský	A	December 19, 1980	
Zličín		Zličín	the surrounding district	B	November 11, 1994	
