= Křižíkova (Prague Metro) =

Prague metro station

Coordinates: 50°05′33″N 14°27′05″E

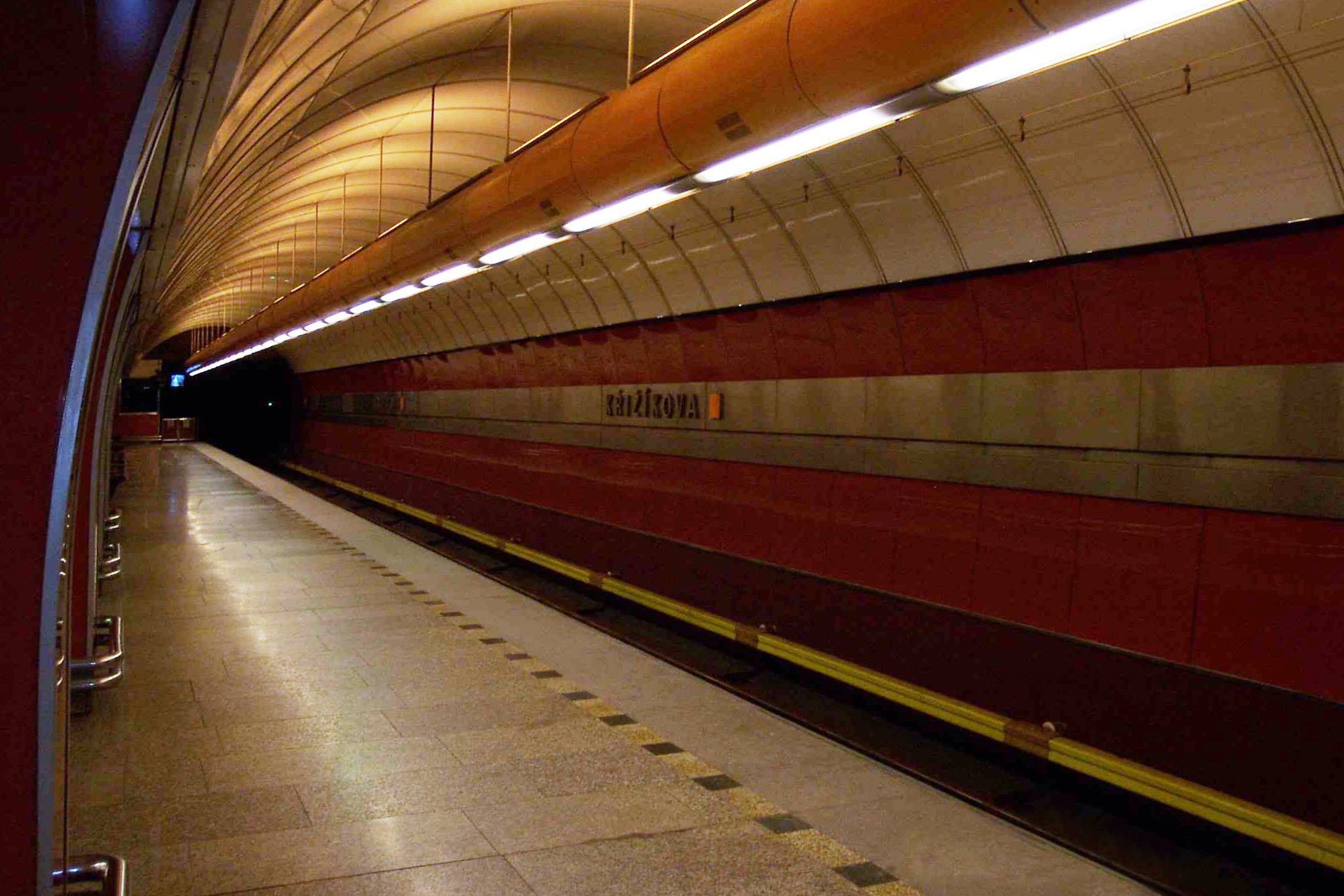

General information
- Location: Thámova street Karlín, Prague 8 Prague; Czech Republic
- System: Prague Metro
- Platforms: 1 island platform
- Tracks: 2
- Connections: Tram: 3, 8, 12, 24; Night transit: 92,94

Construction
- Structure type: Underground
- Depth: 348 m (1,142 ft)

Other information
- Fare zone: PID: Prague

History
- Opened: 22 November 1990; 35 years ago

Services
Preceding station	Prague Metro	Following station
Florenc toward Zličín	Line B	Invalidovna toward Černý Most
Location

Křižíkova (Czech pronunciation: [ˈkr̝ɪʒiːkova]) is a Prague Metro station on Line B in the Prague district of Karlín. The station was opened on 22 November 1990 as part of the extension from Florenc to Českomoravská. It was severely damaged in the 2002 floods, but was re-opened after being restored the following year. The eponymous street adjacent to the station was named after František Křižík, an engineer and inventor who had his factory near the current station.
