= Náměstí Republiky (Prague Metro) =

Prague metro station

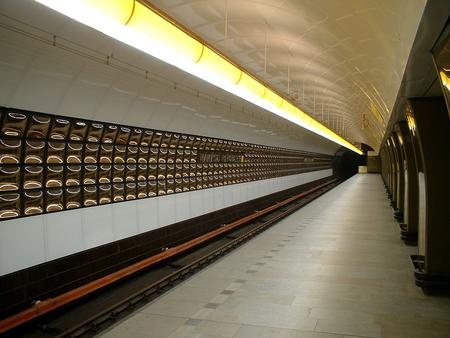
- Line B platform

General information
- Location: New Town; Prague 1 Prague; Czech Republic
- Coordinates: 50.0883°N 14.4318°E
- System: Prague Metro
- Owner: Dopravní podnik hl. m. Prahy
- Line: B
- Platforms: 1 island platform
- Tracks: 2

Construction
- Structure type: Underground
- Depth: 40 m (130 ft)
- Platform levels: 1
- Parking: No
- Cycle facilities: No

Other information
- Fare zone: PID: Prague P

History
- Opened: 2 November 1985; 40 years ago

Services
Preceding station	Prague Metro	Following station
Můstek toward Zličín	Line B	Florenc toward Černý Most
Location
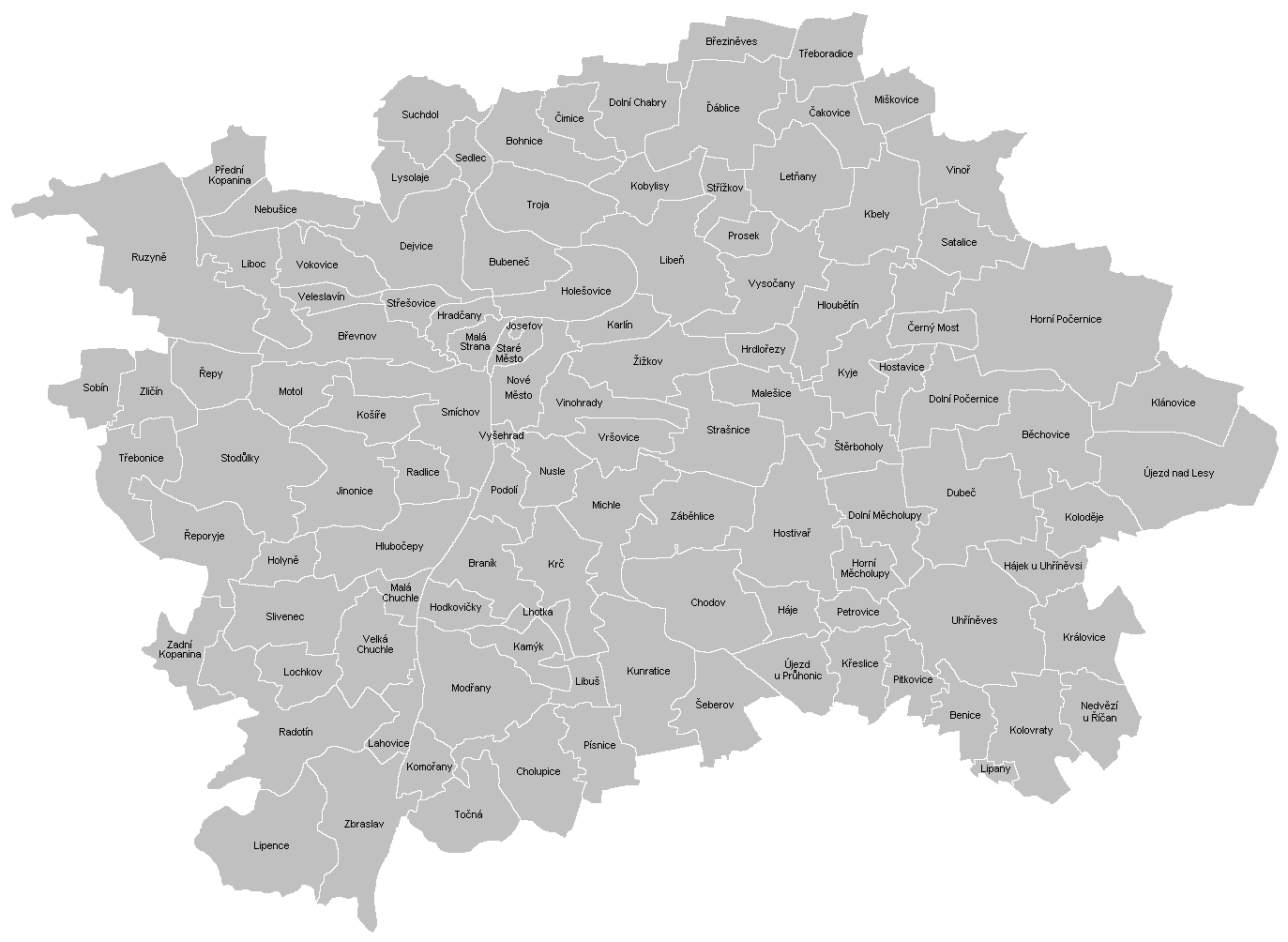
- Location within Prague Location within Greater Prague Location within Czech Republic

Náměstí Republiky (Czech pronunciation: [ˈnaːmɲɛsciː ˈrɛpublɪkɪ]) is a Prague Metro station on Line B in the Prague 1 district. Its two exits serve the Republic Square (Náměstí Republiky) area and the Masaryk suburban railway terminal (Praha Masarykovo nádraží) respectively. The station was opened on 2 November 1985, as part of the inaugural section of Line B between Sokolovská and Smíchovské nádraží.
