= Florenc Central Bus Station =

Bus station in Prague

Florenc Central Bus Station Ústřední autobusové nádraží Florenc
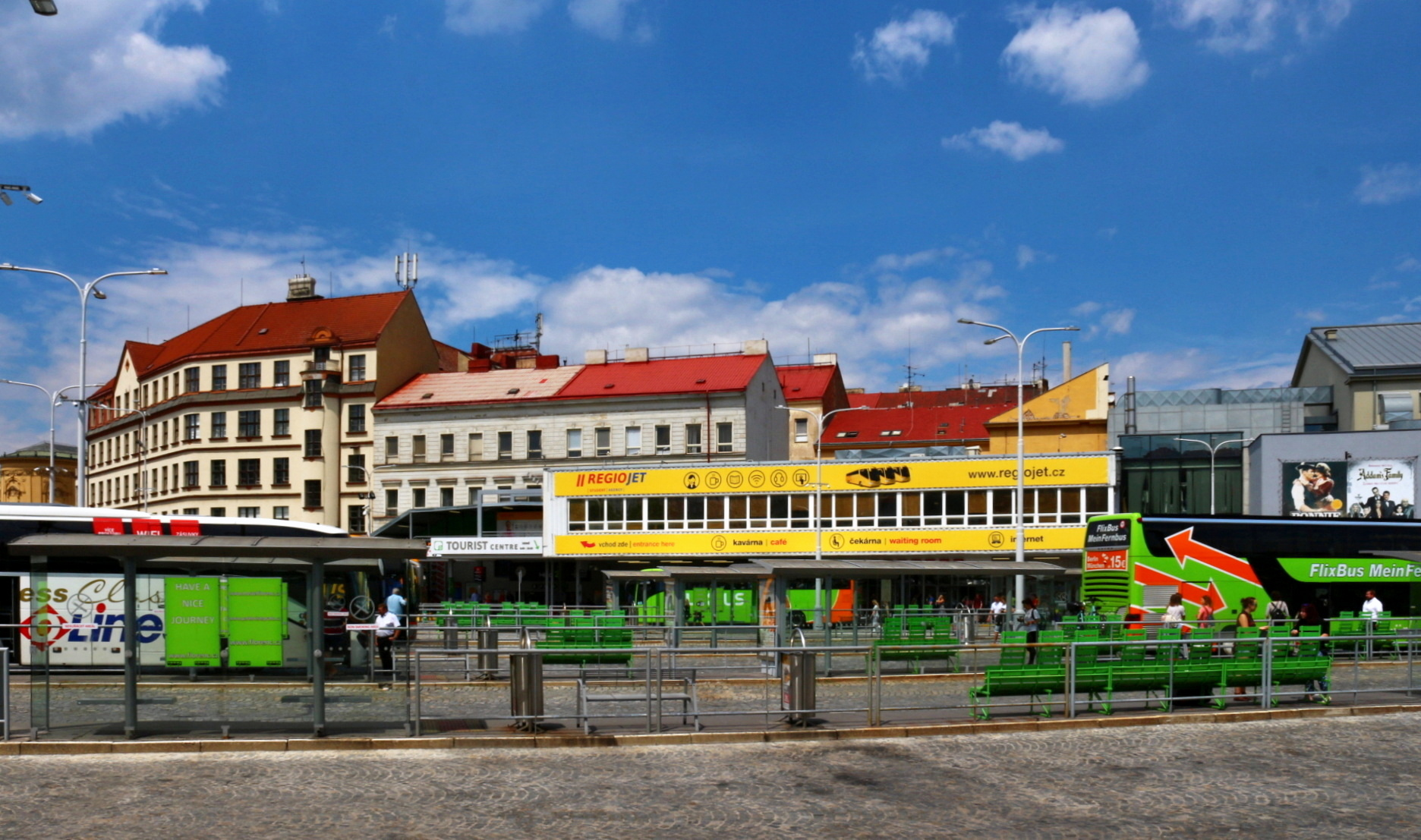

General information
- Other names: ÚAN Florenc
- Owner: ČSAD Praha holding a.s.

Other information
- Website: florenc.cz
Location

Florenc Central Bus Station (Czech: Ústřední autobusové nádraží Florenc, abbreviated ÚAN Florenc) is the principal international bus terminal in Prague, Czech Republic. It is the largest and most well-known bus terminal in the country. It is located on the eastern edge of the city centre, on the border of New Town and the Karlín district in Prague 8. The old hall with the former main entrance is located on Křížikova street next to the Karlín Music Theatre. The entrance for buses is from the crossroads of Prvního pluku and Malého street.

Between 1992 and 2004, the name of the bus terminal was also in the name of the joint-stock company that owned the bus terminal.

The terminal sees 10 million travellers yearly. It is located above the Prague metro station of the same name.

== See also ==
- Buses in Prague
