= Prague Central Station =

Prague Central Station may refer to:

- Praha Masarykovo nádraží, named Praha střed (Prague Central) until 1990.
- Praha hlavní nádraží (Prague main railway station)
  - Hlavní nádraží (Prague Metro), the adjacent metro station
