= Třebonice =

- Cadastral Area of Prague
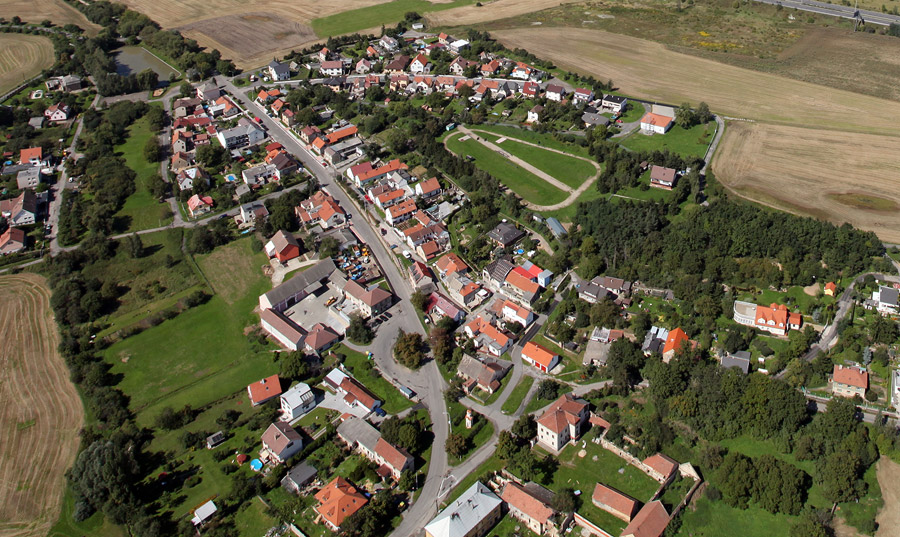
- Aerial view of Třebonice

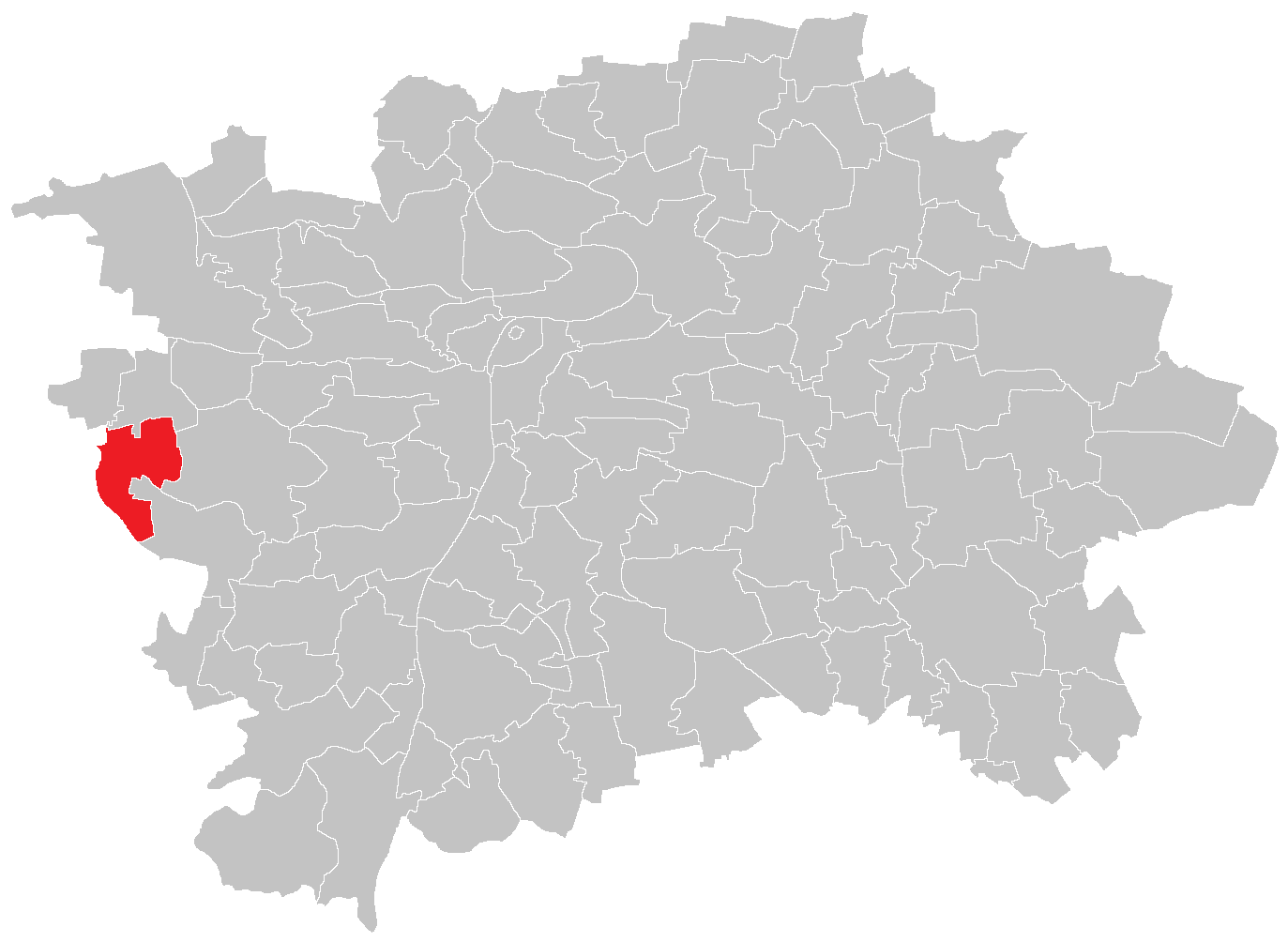
- Location of Třebonice in Prague
- Coordinates: 50°02′42″N 14°16′47″E
- Country: Czech Republic
- Region: Prague
- District: Prague 13, Prague-Řeporyje, Prague-Zličín

Area
  - Total: 4.58 km^{2} (1.77 sq mi)

Population (2021)
  - Total: 651
  - Density: 142/km^{2} (368/sq mi)
- Time zone: UTC+1 (CET)
  - Summer (DST): UTC+2 (CEST)

Třebonice is a village in Prague, capital of the Czech Republic. It was founded in the thirteenth century, and became part of Prague in 1968. It is now part of the Prague 5 administrative district, and the local government districts of Prague 13 and Prague 17. Třebonice is part of Zličín and Řeporyje. It has about 700 inhabitants

Třebonice also includes the settlements of Chaby and Krteň (currently unoccupied). There are plans to build a new district, to be called Západní Město (West Town), which will extend towards Třebonice.

Třebonice is served by a station at Zličín, on Prague Metro Line B.

== Demographics ==
Historical population

Year	Pop.	±%
1869	328	—
1880	355	+8.2%
1890	399	+12.4%
1900	459	+15.0%
1910	438	−4.6%
1921	398	−9.1%
1930	604	+51.8%
1950	635	+5.1%

Year	Pop.	±%
1961	407	−35.9%
1970	353	−13.3%
1980	439	+24.4%
1991	391	−10.9%
2001	388	−0.8%
2011	478	+23.2%
2021	651	+36.2%

Source: Censuses
