= Hotel Olympik =

Hotel in Prague, Czech Republic

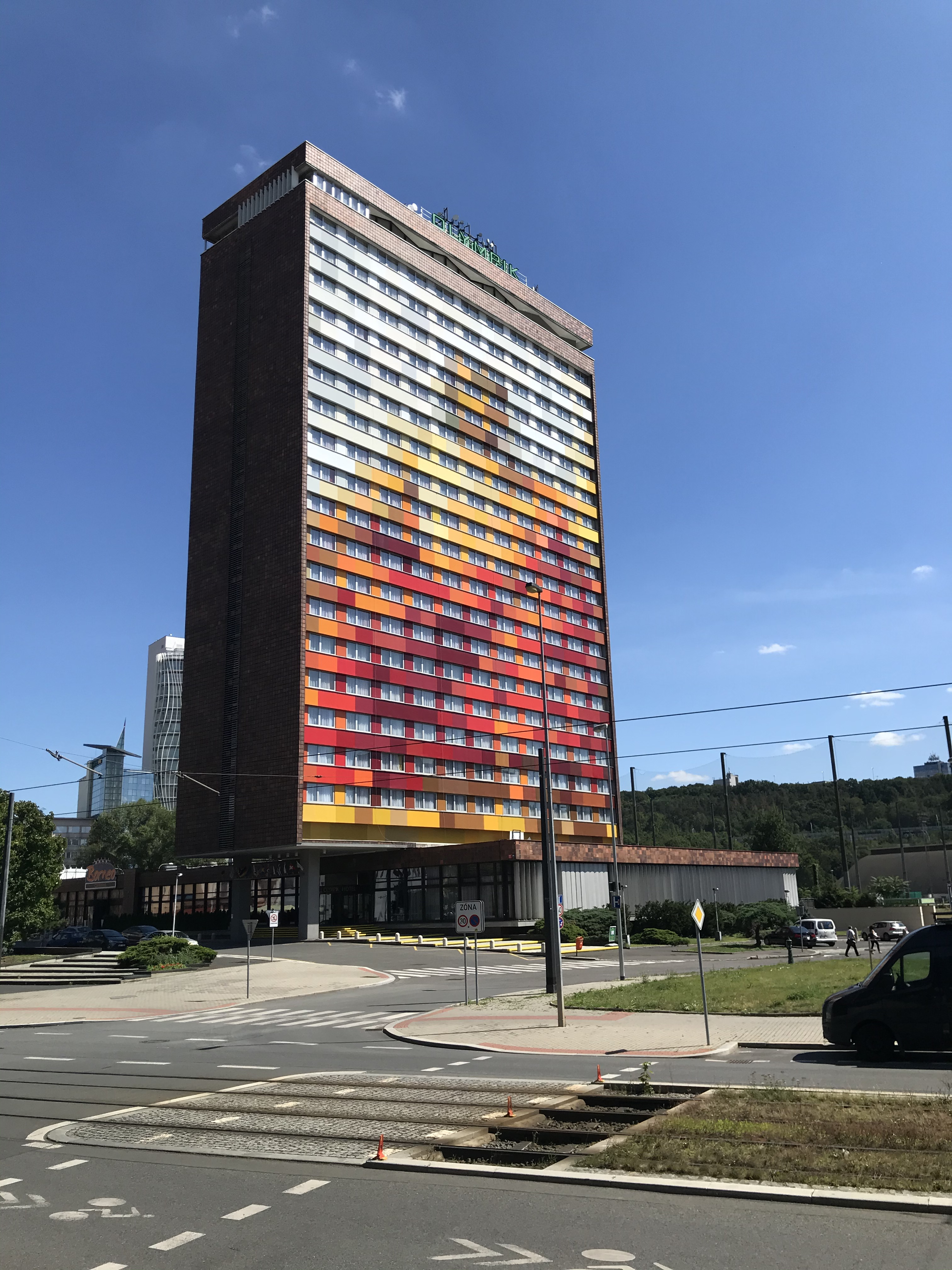
- Hotel Olympik with the facade from 2015

- Location within Czech Republic

General information
- Status: Completed
- Type: Hotel
- Location: Sokolovská 615/138, Prague, 186 00, Prague, Czech Republic
- Coordinates: 50.098320°N 14.468289°E

Height
- Height: 73 m (240 ft)

Technical details
- Floor count: 21

Other information
- Number of rooms: 306

Website
- www.olympik.cz/en/olympik/

Hotel Olympik is a large hotel in the Karlín area of the 8th district of Prague, Czech Republic. The hotel is near the Invalidovna housing facility and the Čechie Karlín stadium. Hotel Olympik is located at 138 Sokolovská Street.

== History ==
The Hotel Olympik was designed by a team of architects led by Josef Polak between 1967 and 1971. The hotel was opened to the public in 1973. The building is 73 metres (240 ft) high, has 21 floors, and overlooks the city quarter of Karlín.

The hotel was finished in 1974, and at the time had 715 beds. A fire at the hotel in 1995 claimed eight lives and left 34 people injured. One of the biggest fires in Czech Republic history, it resulted in damages of 35 million CZK. The fire started on the 11th floor of the hotel and is believed to have been caused by an overheating appliance.

On 5 October 2008, thieves broke into the hotel safe and stole the equivalent of about CZK 1,000,000 in different currencies (about US$55,500) and a large number of shares from the Olympic Holding Company.

In 2015, the hotel was given a new brightly coloured facade.

== 1980 Summer Olympics ==
According to some experts, Hotel Olympik was built in preparation for Prague's bid to host the 1980 Summer Olympics. The housing area Invalidovna would have been the Olympic village. After Moscow placed a bid, Prague withdrew its application. The hotel is not in a tourist area; it hosts many conferences and business gatherings.

== Photogallery ==
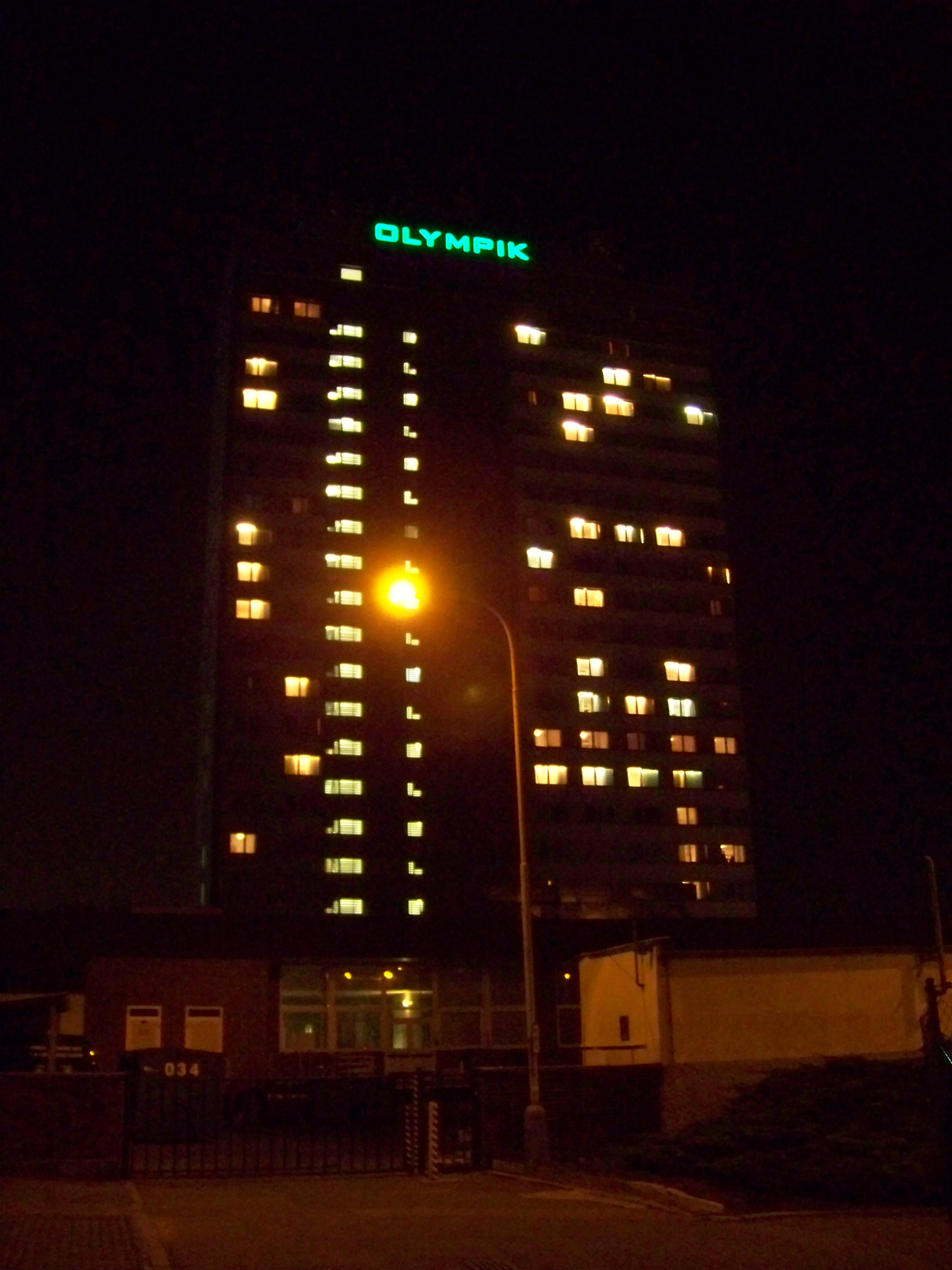
Hotel Olympik in the night

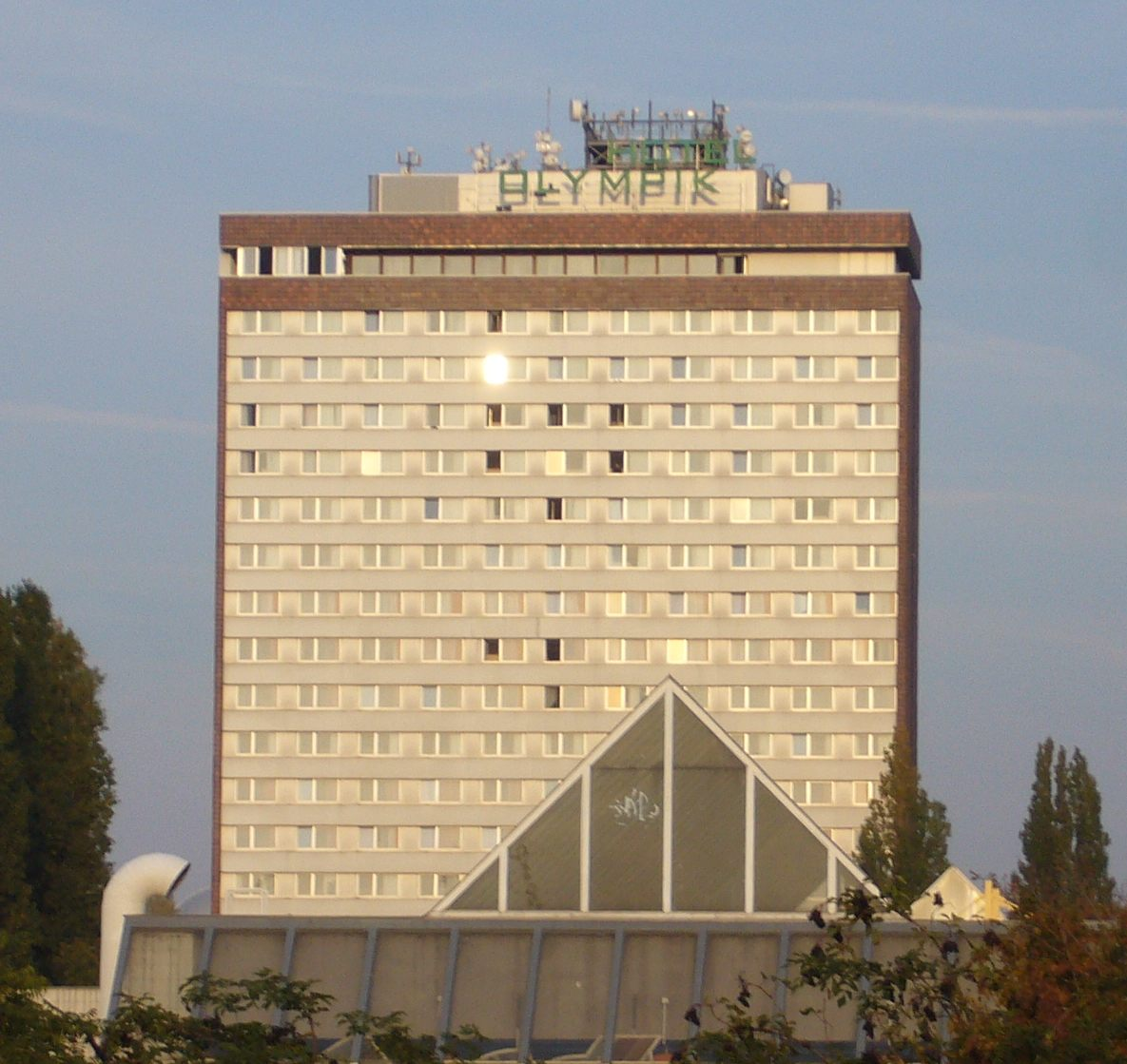
Hotel Olympik in the sunlight

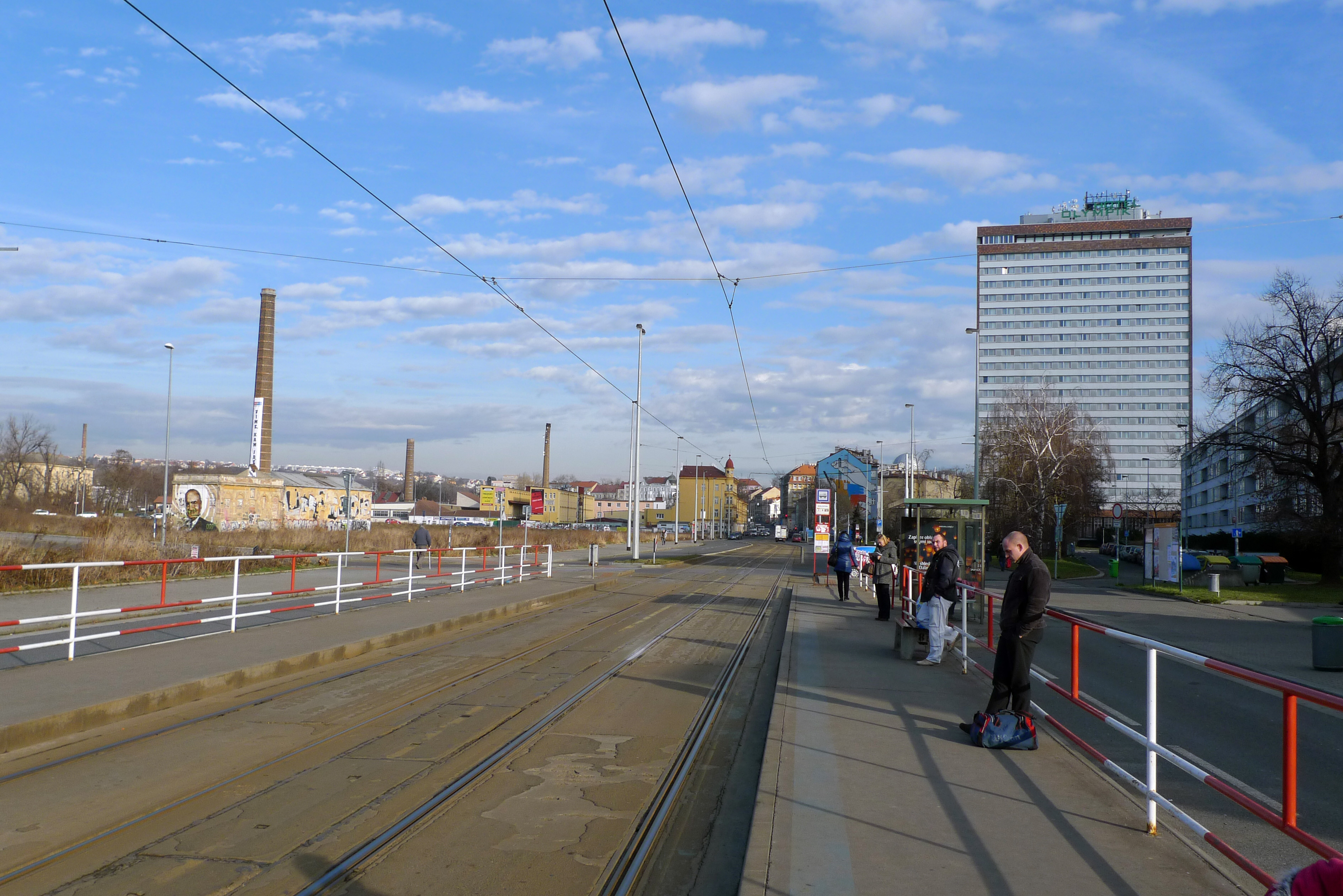
Hotel Olympik from the tram station Invalidovna

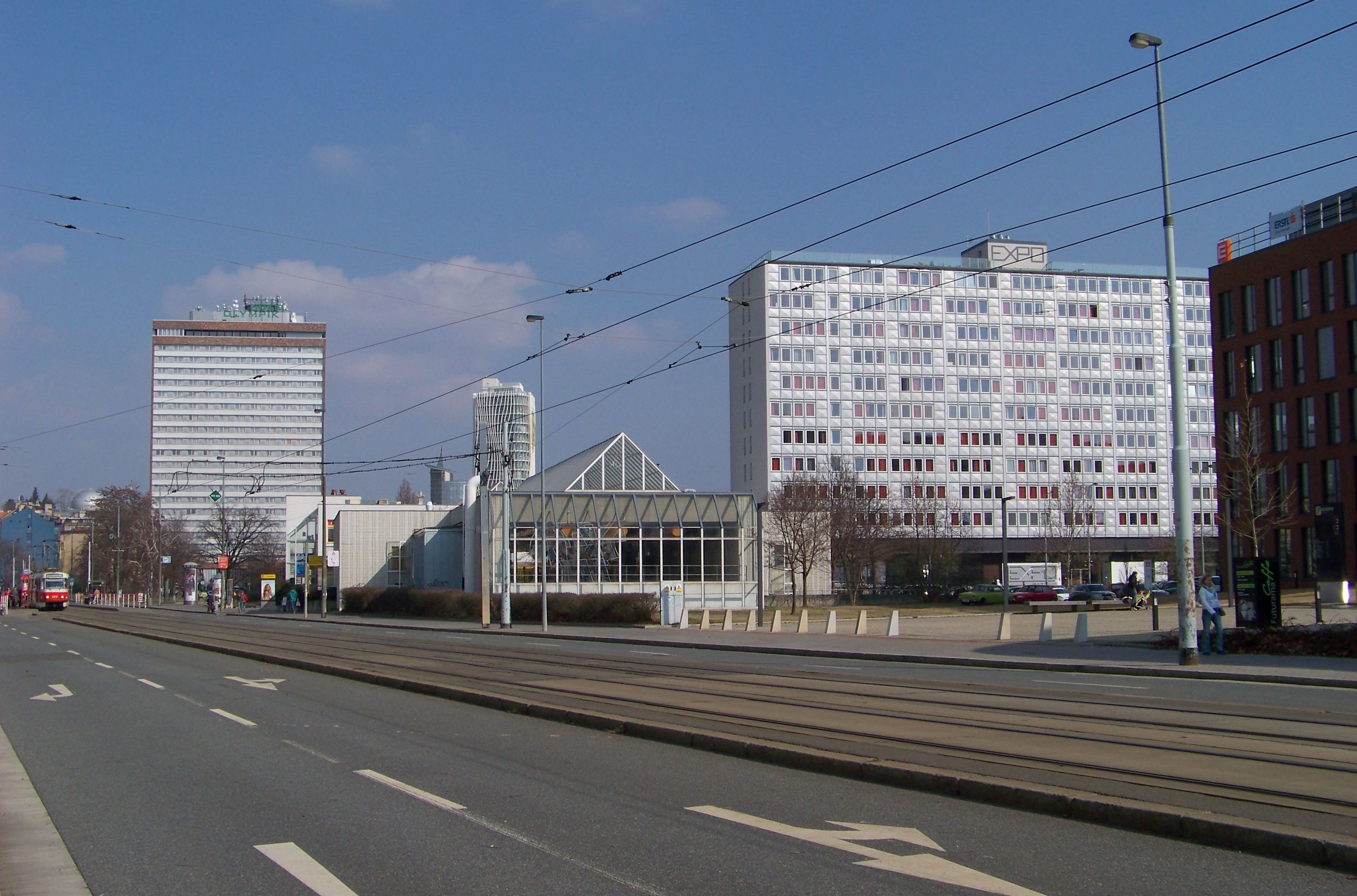
Hotel Olympik from the street Sokolovská

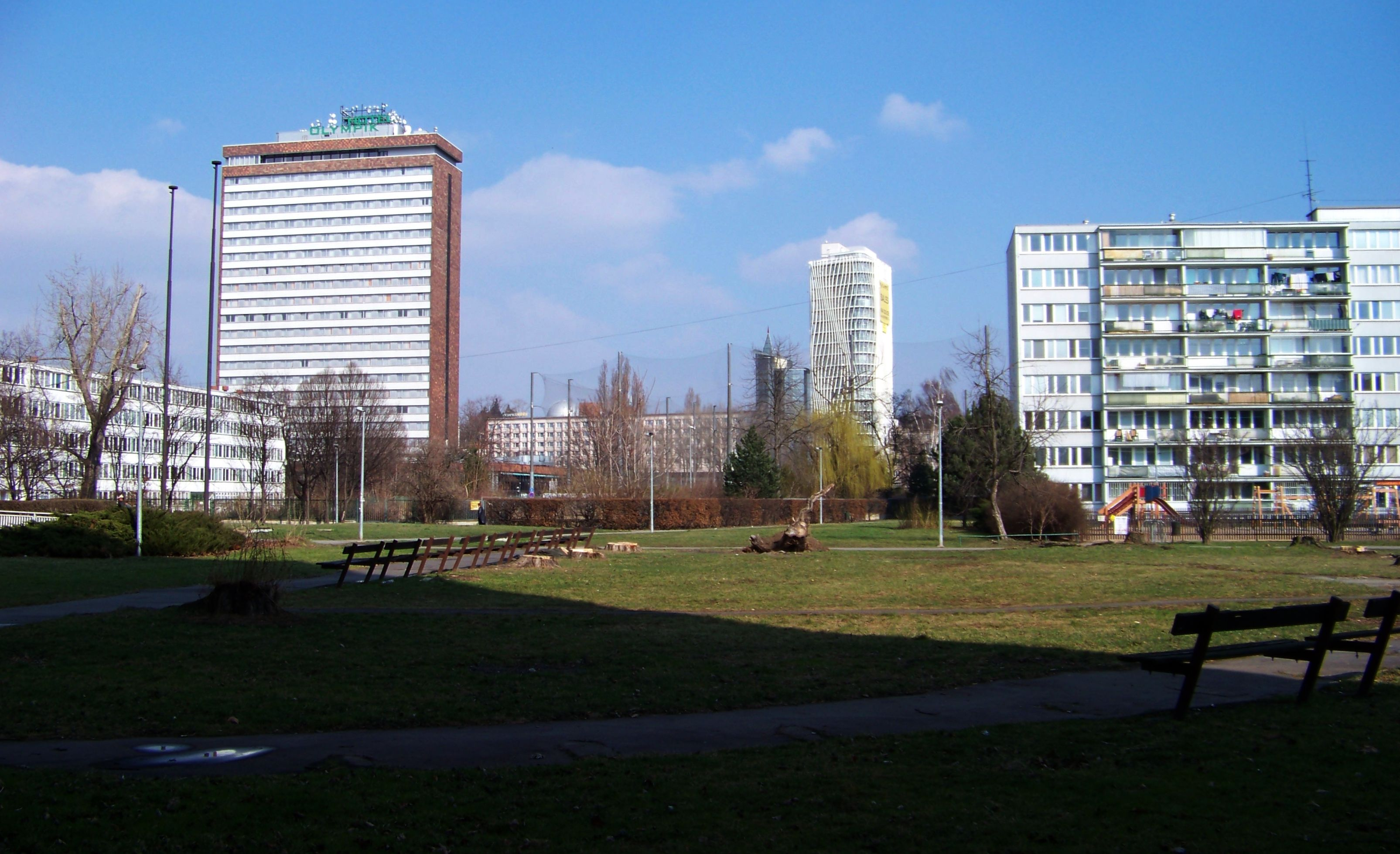
Hotel Olympik and the housing development Invalidovna
