= Českomoravská =

Prague metro station

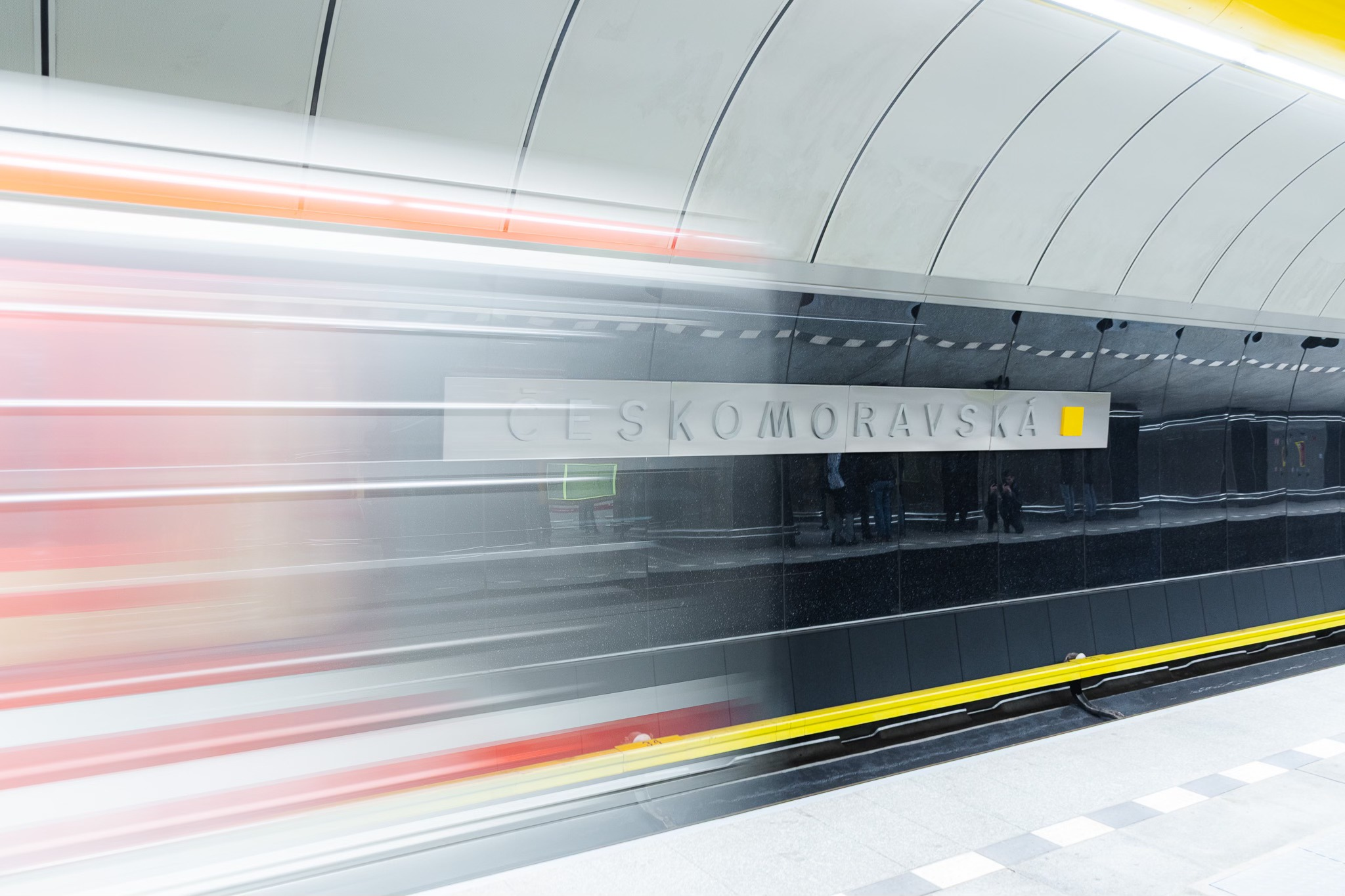
- Station platform

General information
- Location: Drahobejlova; Prague 9 - Libeň; Prague; Czech Republic
- Coordinates: 50.106°N 14.492°E
- System: Prague Metro
- Owner: Dopravní podnik hl. m. Prahy
- Line: B
- Platforms: Island platform
- Tracks: 2

Construction
- Structure type: Underground
- Depth: 258 m (846 ft)
- Platform levels: 1
- Cycle facilities: No

Other information
- Fare zone: PID: P

History
- Opened: 22 November 1990; 35 years ago
- Closed: 6 January 2025; 19 months ago

Services
Preceding station	Prague Metro	Following station
Palmovka toward Zličín	Line B	Vysočanská toward Černý Most
Location
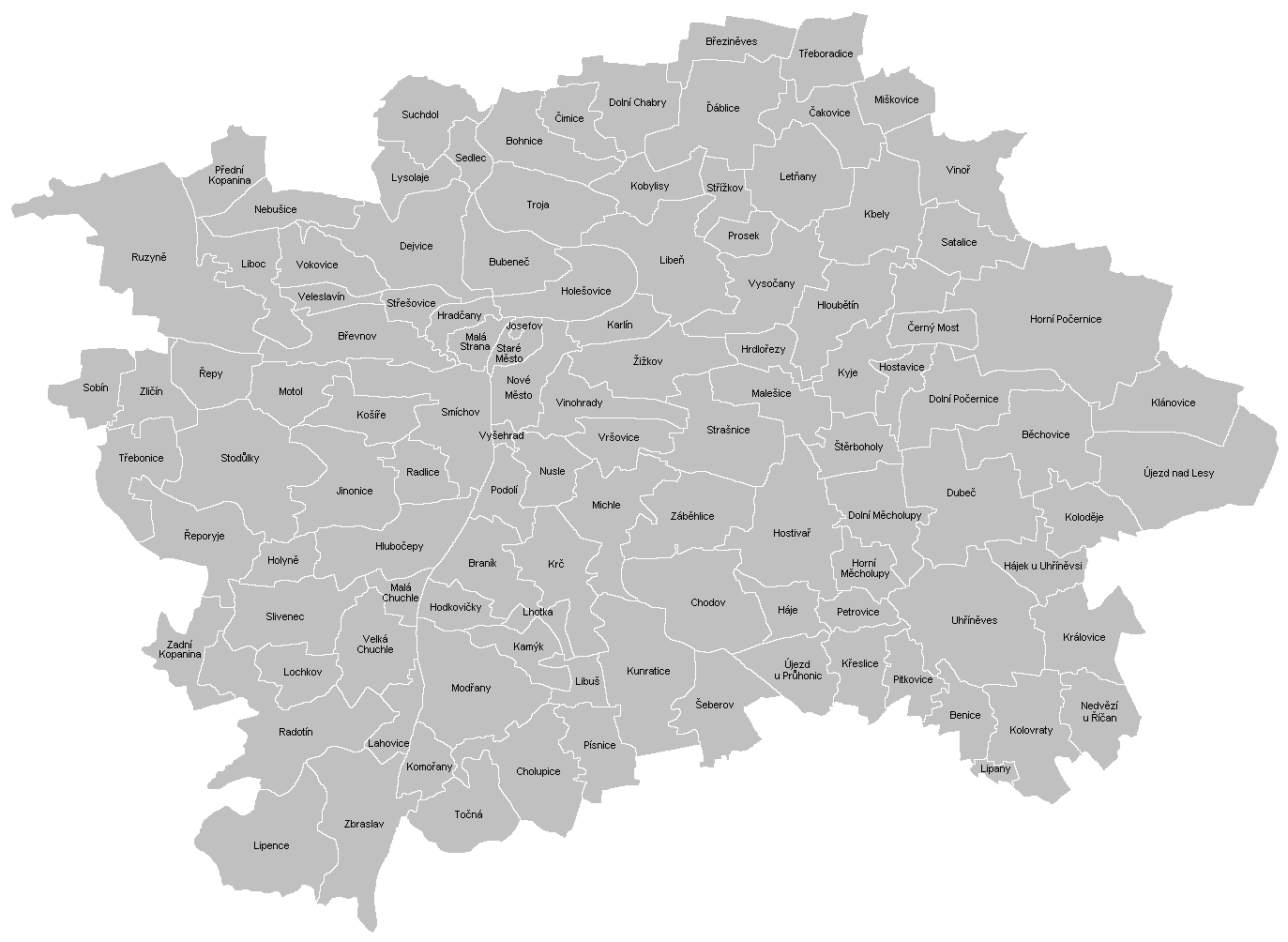
- Location within Greater Prague

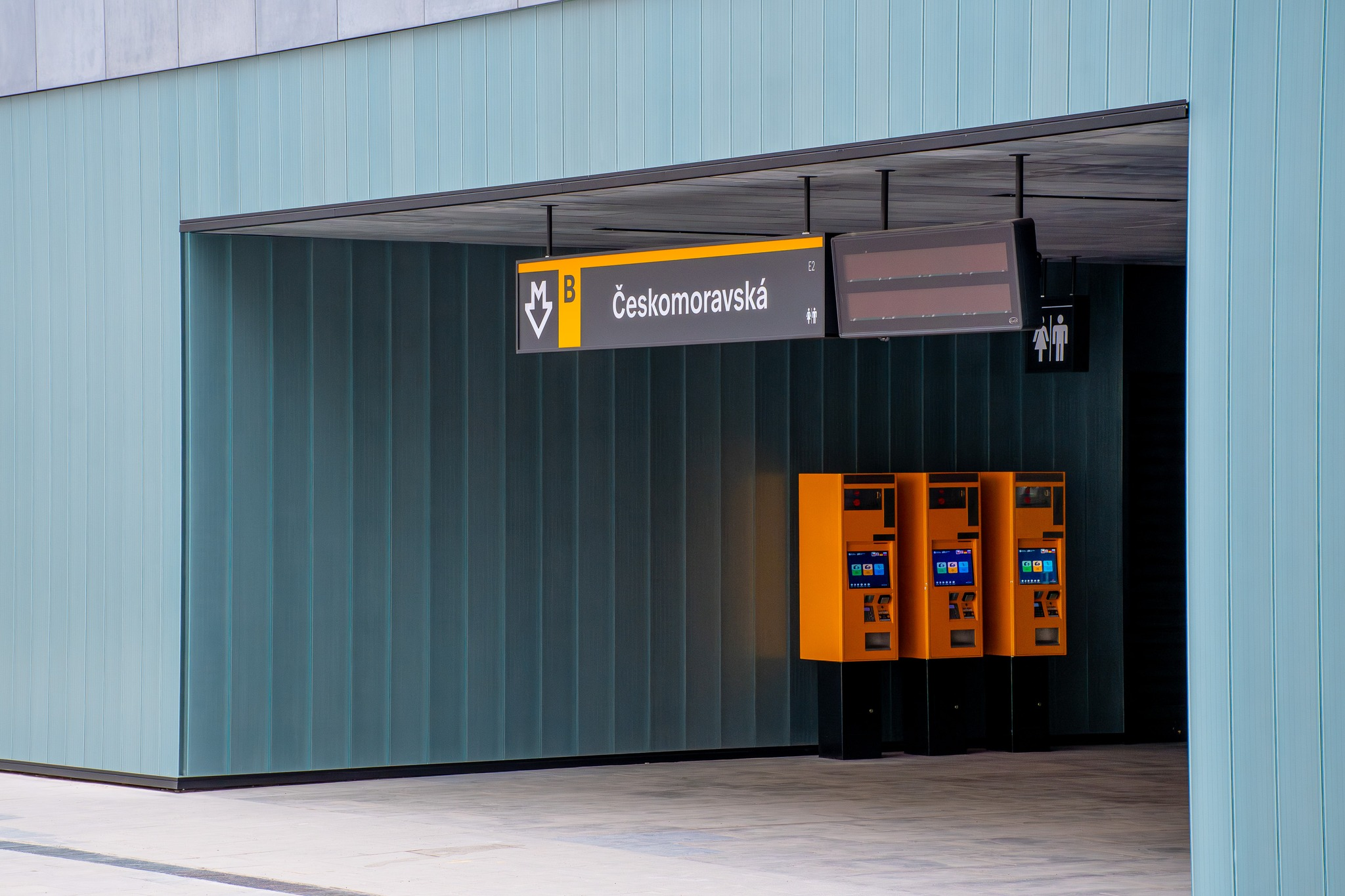
Entrance to the station

Českomoravská (Czech pronunciation: [ˈtʃɛskomorafskaː]) is a Prague Metro station on Line B. It was opened on 22 November 1990 as the eastern terminus of the extension from Florenc. It is under Drahobejlova street in Libeň. Českomoravská remained a terminal station until the extension of Line B to Černý Most on 8 November 1998.

The station was built using the TBM method and has a platform 26 m (85 ft) below ground level. There is one exit through an escalator tunnel. An adjacent bus station serves as a terminal for some urban and suburban lines in the northeast of Prague. The multifunctional O2 arena, formerly Sazka Arena, built in 2004, is next to the Českomoravská station. The shopping center Galerie Harfa is also in the immediate vicinity of the station.

Zápotockého was the originally intended name for this station (after Czech communist politician Antonín Zápotocký), but this idea was abandoned after the Velvet Revolution in 1989. The current name Českomoravská (literally: Bohemo-Moravian) derives from the large Českomoravská Kolben-Daněk engineering company, once based nearby.

The station was closed on 6 January 2025 for a year for renovations, and opened back up on 20 March 2026.
