= Karlín Music Theatre =

Establishment in Prague, Czechia

- Hudební divadlo Karlín

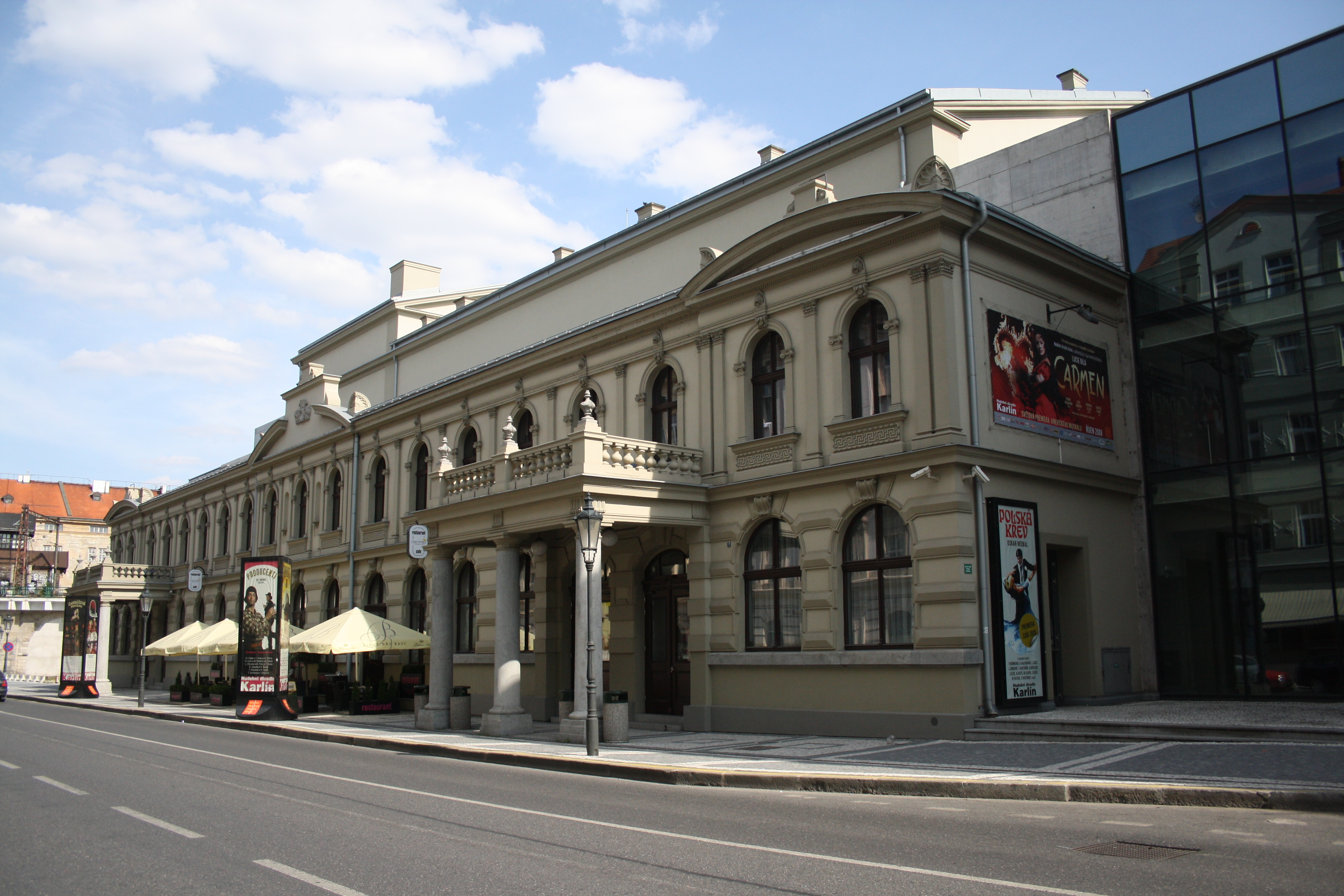
- Interactive map of Karlín Music Theatre
- Address: Křižíkova 283, Karlín; Prague; Czechia
- Coordinates: 50°5′24.36″N 14°26′28.46″E
- Type: Theatre
- Current use: Musical theatre

Construction
- Built: 1881

Website
- hdk.cz/en

The Karlín Music Theatre (Czech: Hudební divadlo Karlín) is a theatre in the Karlín district of Prague, in Czechia, devoted largely to the performance of operettas and musical theatre. Built in 1881, it is now the second largest theatre in Prague after the Prague State Opera.
