= Florenc (Prague Metro) =

Czech metro station

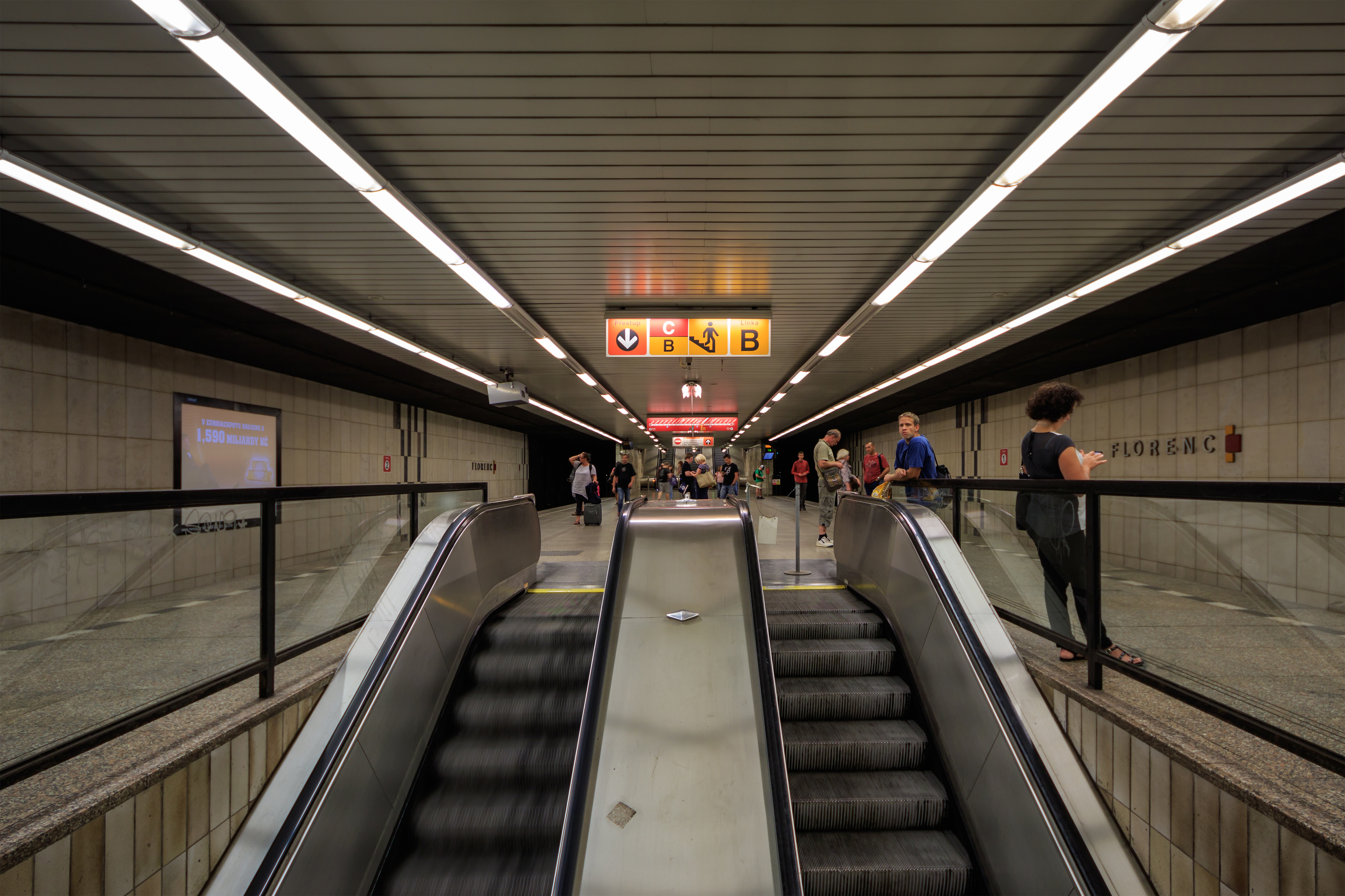
- Line C platform

General information
- Location: Sokolovská; Prague 8 - Karlín; Prague; Czech Republic
- Coordinates: 50.091°N 14.439°E
- System: Prague Metro
- Owner: Dopravní podnik hl. m. Prahy
- Line: B C
- Platforms: 2 island platforms
- Tracks: 4
- Connections: Metro line C; Tram: 3, 8, 12, 24; Bus: 133,135,175,194,207; Night transit: 92,94,908,909

Construction
- Structure type: Underground
- Depth: B: 39 metres C: 9,35 metres
- Platform levels: 2
- Parking: No
- Cycle facilities: No
- Accessible: Yes (both stations)

Other information
- Fare zone: PID: Prague

History
- Opened: B 2 November 1985; 40 years ago C 9 May 1974; 52 years ago
- Former names: Sokolovská

Services
Preceding station	Prague Metro	Following station
Náměstí Republiky toward Zličín	Line B	Křižíkova toward Černý Most
Vltavská toward Letňany	Line C	Hlavní nádraží toward Háje
Location
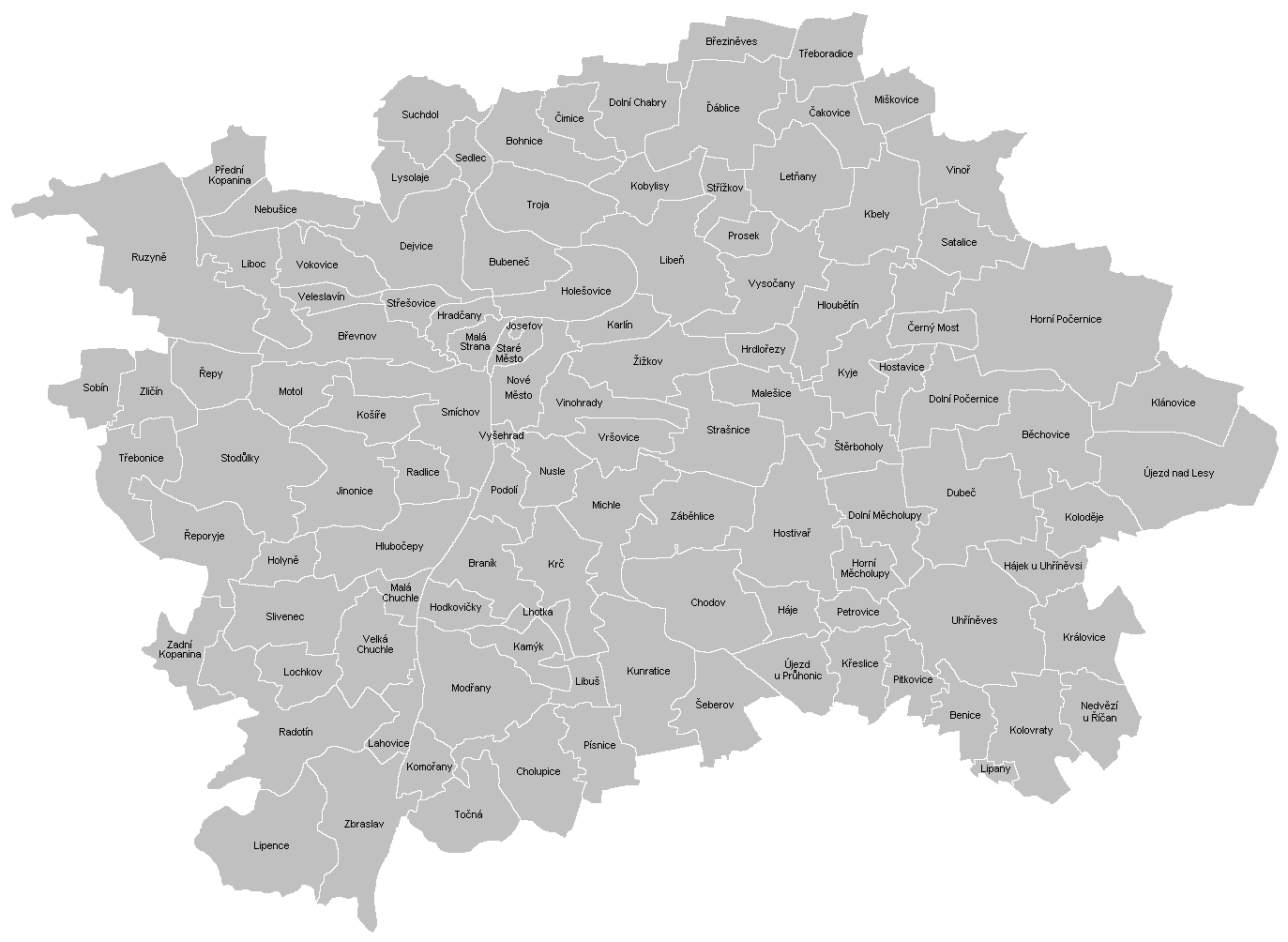
- Location within Prague Location within Greater Prague Location within Czech Republic

Florenc (Czech pronunciation: [ˈflorɛnts]) is a major interchange station on the Prague Metro system, located beneath the busy Florenc intersection in Karlín, adjacent to Florenc bus station. It serves as a transfer point between Line B and Line C, each with its own platform and structural design. The station opened in 1974 for Line C (then known as Sokolovská until 1990), and in 1985 for Line B.

== Line B station ==
The Line B station is a three-aisle, column-type structure with an elevated central nave. It lies 39 meters underground, deeper than the Line C platform, which is 9.35 meters underground. It features 23 pairs of cross-passages and was constructed between 1977 and 1985 at a cost of 560 million Czechoslovak crowns. It initially served as the terminus of Line B until the 1990 extension.

The interior is clad in ceramic tiles in brown and beige tones. The transfer tunnel to Line C departs from the eastern end of the central nave and consists of two connected escalator tunnels. It connects perpendicularly to the Line C platform via a deep four-flight escalator.

Although a western exit to Na Poříčí street was planned, it was never completed. The station was made accessible in 2006 with two elevators: one from the bridge in the transfer corridor, and the other from the corridor to the surface at Na Florenci and Na Poříčí streets.

A ventilation shaft for Line B is located near the bus terminal next to the Wilsonova flyover.

=== 2002 Flooding ===
In 2002, Florenc was flooded during the major Vltava River flood. Two metro trains of type 81-71 stored at the station could not be evacuated and were later rebuilt into 81-71M units at Škoda Transportation in Plzeň. During renovations in 2002–2003, the station's original cylindrical light fixtures were removed and replaced with copper suspended ceilings.

== Line C station ==
Opened in 1974, the Line C station is a cut-and-cover structure with no internal columns and a ceiling of prefabricated concrete beams. A concourse above the platform connects both exits.

The platform is clad in marble and granite from Liberec, and escalators lead down to the transfer corridor to Line B. The platform lies at a depth of 9.35 meters.

There are two exits:

- A southern exit by stairs to the Florenc bus terminal.
- A northern exit via a three-flight escalator, built in 1985, leading to a shared vestibule with Line B.

The connecting corridor features slate and red phyllite from Železný Brod.

Construction lasted from 1969 to 1974 and cost 210 million Kčs. The station served as the northern terminus of Line C until the 1984 extension to Nádraží Holešovice. The old bus terminal was partially demolished during construction.

A diaphragm wall method was used (10,570 m² of panels), with a roof slab built on top, followed by excavation of 130,100 m³ of material. The station used 29,400 m³ of concrete. The tunnel boring machine Pavel was turned around at the station, and the transfer corridor to Line B was built under the platform.

Until 1978, no sidings existed north of the station. Trains reversed via a crossover before the station, and the track bed uses ballast—unusual in the Prague Metro.

== Vestibules ==
Florenc has two main vestibules:

- The northern vestibule is a five-level structure located in Karlín. Several buildings were demolished for its construction in the 1980s. It includes a supermarket and connects to tram stops. After the 2002 flood, it was modified for mobile flood barriers.
- The southern vestibule is subsurface and connects to the Florenc bus terminal and nearby streets in Karlín.

== Inter-line connection ==
A single-track tunnel connects Lines B and C for depot transfers. The tunnel runs from Line B (before Florenc westbound) to Line C (after Florenc southeast-bound), allowing trains to transfer without reversing.

Before the 1994 opening of the Line B depot at Zličín, trains were often towed to the Kačerov depot on Line C. Part of the lower tunnel was used for reversing Line B trains when Florenc was a terminus.

The tunnel runs under the site of the modern Hilton Hotel.

== See also ==
- Florenc bus station
