= Hlavní nádraží (Prague Metro) =

Prague metro station

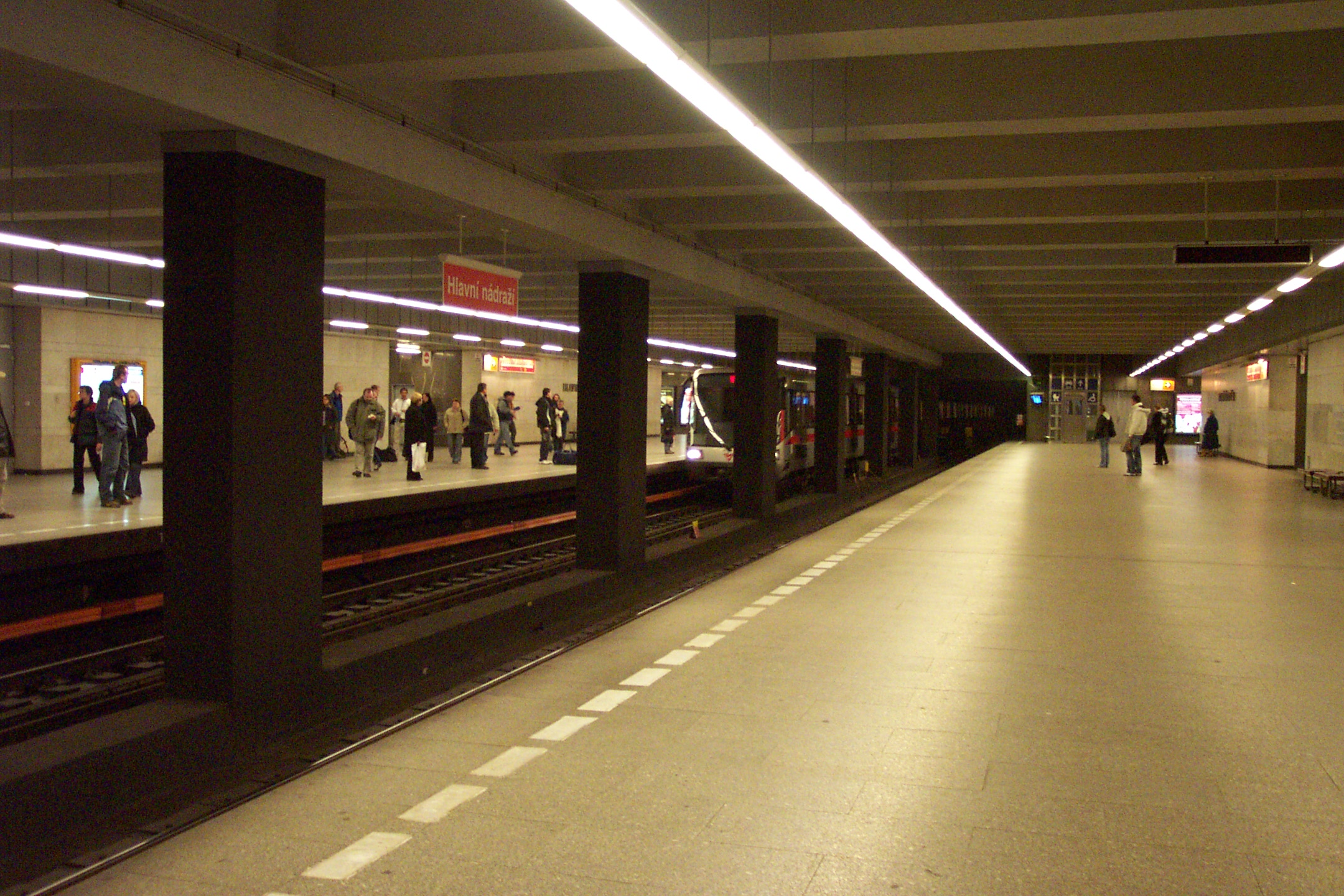
- Platforms

General information
- Location: Wilsonova; Prague 1 - New Town; Prague; Czech Republic
- Coordinates: 50.083°N 14.436°E
- System: Prague Metro
- Owner: Dopravní podnik hl. m. Prahy
- Line: C
- Platforms: 2 side platforms
- Tracks: 2
- Connections: Tram: 5,9,15,26; Suburban rail system; International bus routes and Prague Airport Express (AE)

Construction
- Structure type: Underground
- Platform levels: 1
- Cycle facilities: No
- Accessible: Yes

History
- Opened: 9 May 1974

Services
| Preceding station | Prague Metro | Following station |
|---|---|---|
| Florenc toward Letňany | Line C | Muzeum toward Háje |
Location
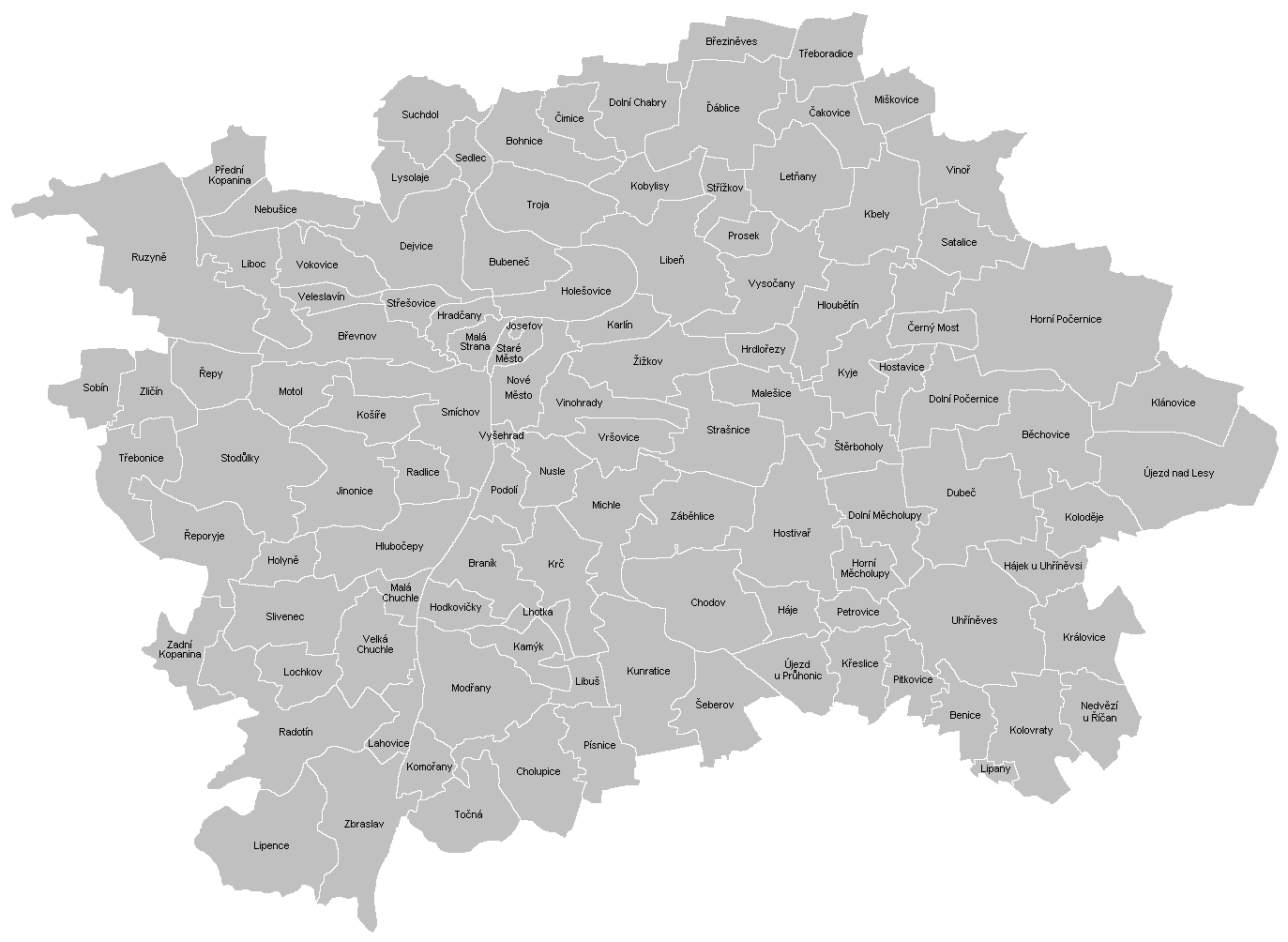
- Location within Prague Location within Greater Prague Location within Czech Republic

Hlavní nádraží (Czech pronunciation: [ˈɦlavɲiː ˈnaːdraʒiː]) is a Prague Metro station on Line C. The metro station serves Praha hlavní nádraží, Prague's principal mainline railway station. The metro station is situated underground, below the railway station.

== History ==
Hlavní nádraží is one of the oldest stations on the Prague Metro network. It was originally designed for underground trams and construction was started in 1966. The project was changed later to metro trains, but the station was almost complete. The station was opened on May 9, 1974, with the first section of Prague Metro, between Sokolovská and Kačerov.
