= František Křižík =

Czech engineer

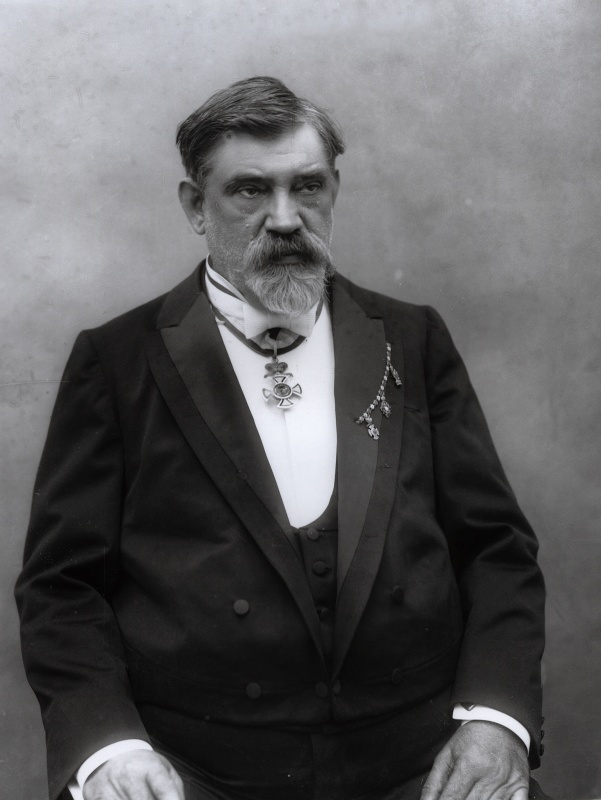
- František Křižík (most likely in 1902)
- Born: 8 July 1847; Plánice, Bohemia
- Died: 22 January 1941 (aged 93); Stádlec, Protectorate of Bohemia and Moravia
- Resting place: Vyšehrad Cemetery
- Occupations: Engineer, entrepreneur
- Known for: Arc lamp

František Křižík (Czech: [ˈfraɲcɪʃɛk ˈkr̝̊ɪʒiːk]; 8 July 1847 – 22 January 1941) was a Czech inventor, electrical engineer and entrepreneur.

== Biography ==
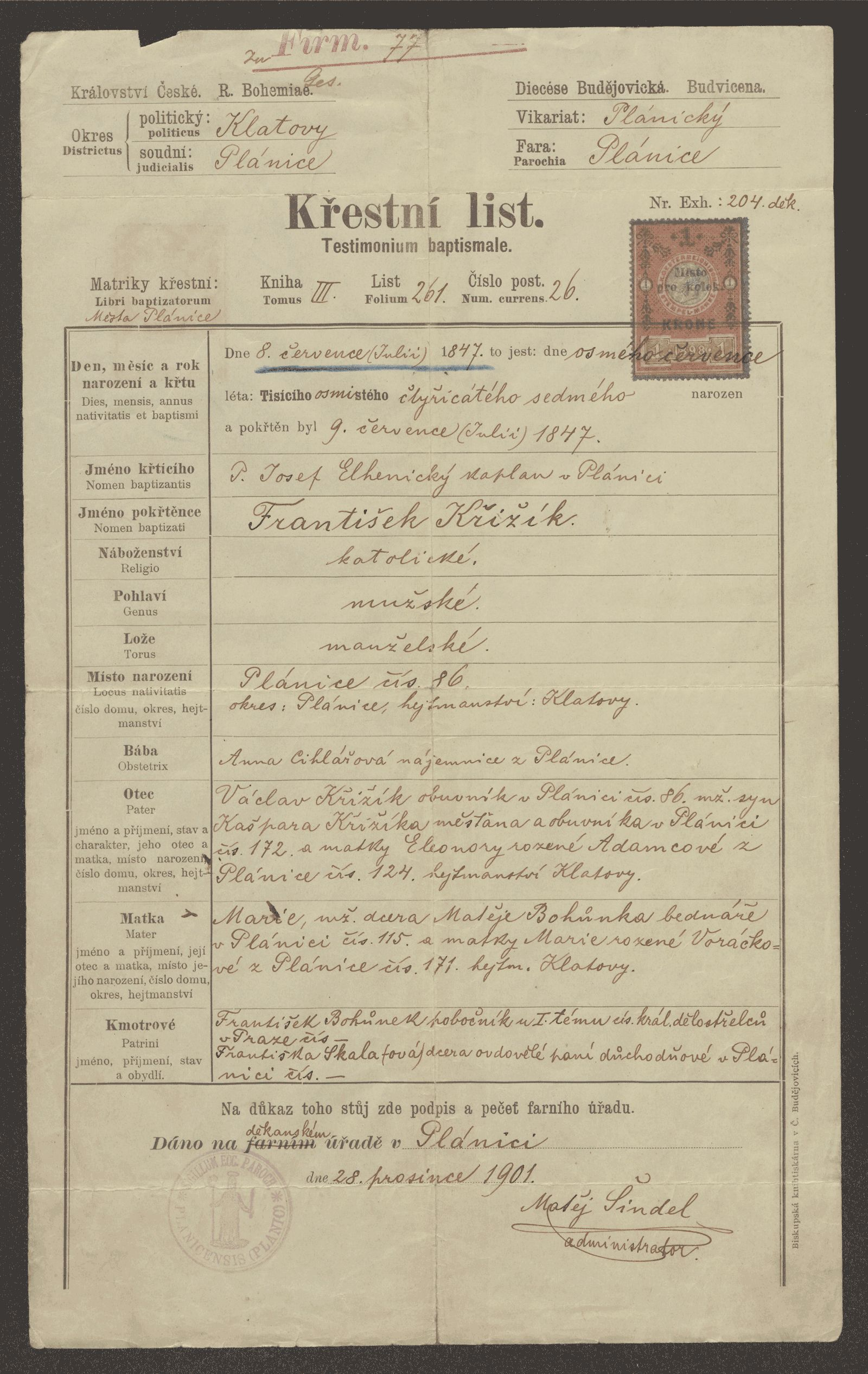
František Křižík Baptismal certificate

Křižík was born on 8 July 1847 into a poor family in Plánice. His father, a shoemaker, died early. When he was 12 the family moved to Prague, where he began studying. For financial reasons he did not graduate from the real school. However, due to his significant technical talent, he was still accepted to the Czech Technical University in Prague (ČVUT) in 1866. After completing his university studies, Křižík was first employed at the Kaufmann factory for the production of telegraphs and signals as a repairman for telegraph devices. He soon began to make his own discoveries.

Křižík is considered the pioneer of practical electrical engineering and in electrification of Bohemia and Austria-Hungary. At the time he was often compared to Thomas Edison. In 1878, Křižík invented a remotely operated signaling device to protect against collision between trains. Křižík's cores are magnetic solenoids cores shaped so as to ensure an approximately uniform pull in different positions in the solenoid.

His first experiments in Plzeň resulted in the invention in 1880 of the automatic electric arc lamp, the so-called "Plzen Lamp" which was displayed at the International Exposition of Electricity in Paris in 1881. This lamp, with self-adjusting brushes, won the gold medal from among 50 similar devices. Later he successfully defended his patent against Werner von Siemens' claim to have created it first. His lamps were successfully used in many cities for street lighting. The restored and fully functional patented arc lamp with automated electrode adjustment can be viewed at the Museum of Plzeň.

In 1884 Křižík set up his own company, building city lighting, tramway lines, street cars, power stations, and various electric equipment. In 1895, Křižík built one of the first electromobiles in Austria-Hungary.

He was an active freemason beginning in 1881 when he joined the masonic lodge Harmonie in Plzeň. He was later active as a member of the lodge Jan Amos Komenský and later the lodge Sibi et posteris in Prague. In 1923, František Křižík was one of the founders and patrons of the National Czechoslovak Grand Lodge.

== Electrified railway Tábor–Bechyně ==
František Křižík built the first electrified railway in the Austro-Hungarian empire from Tábor to Bechyně in 1903. The track gauge was 1,435 mm (4 ft 8 1/2 in) standard gauge. The maximum speed was 50 km/h (31 mph).

== Honours ==
The main belt asteroid 5719 Křižík was named in his honour.

Streets across the Czech Republic are named after him. In Prague's Karlín district, his name is also found on a street and metro station which were built near the location of his factory – Křižíkova.
