= Invalidovna =

Building in Prague, Czech Republic

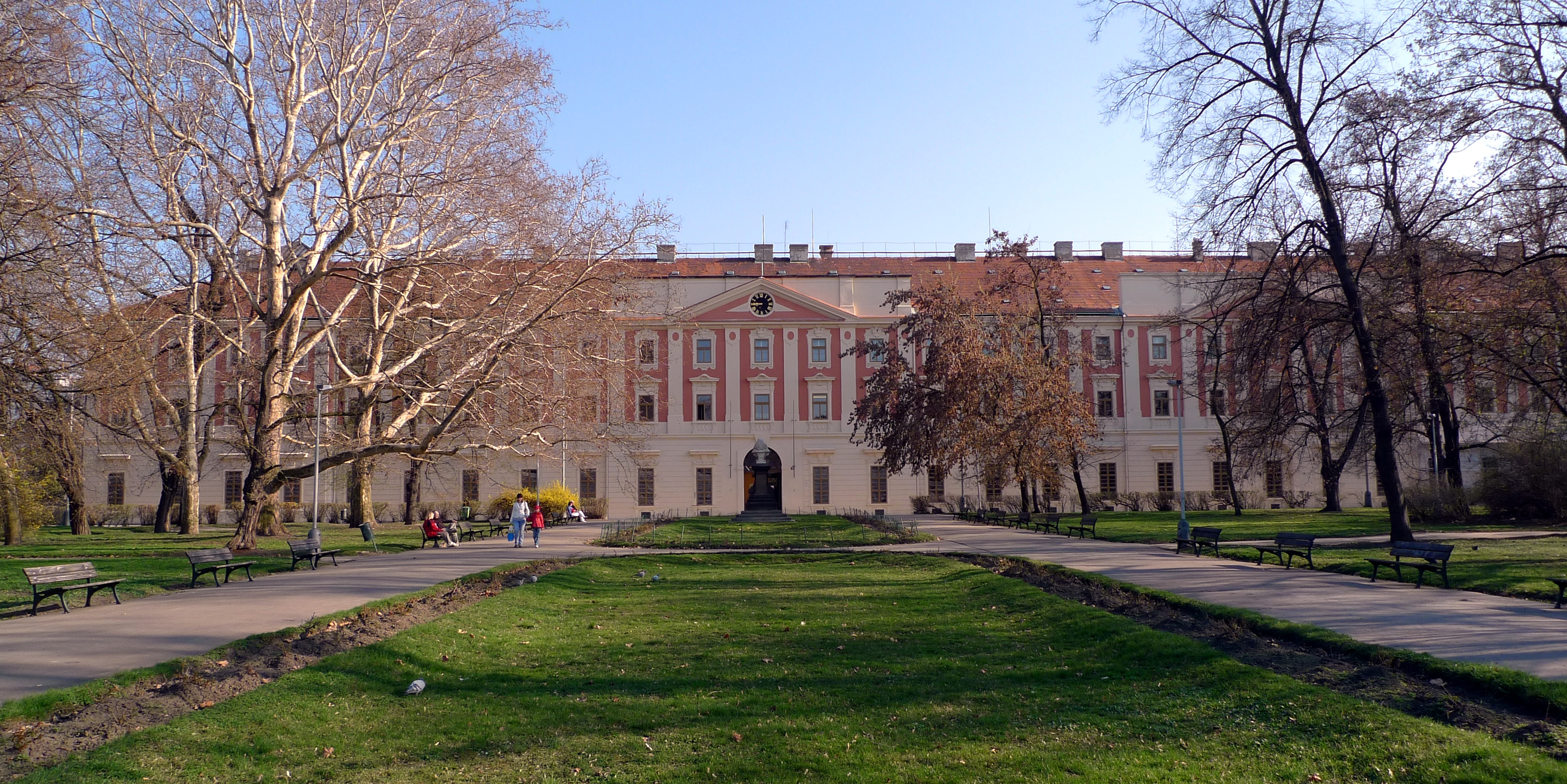
Front view

Invalidovna (French "hôtel des invalides") is a building in Karlín, a district of Prague, Czech Republic.

== History ==
Invalidovna was built in 1731–1737 as a dormitory for war invalids (veterans) by Kilian Ignac Dientzenhofer. Its model was Les Invalides, a building for veterans inaugurated in Paris in 1679.

Only a ninth of the original design was ever completed. At most, about 1,200 inmates lived there. In 1935, all inhabitants moved to another "invalidovna", at Hořice, and the building was used by the Czech army. After this, it was used as an army archive. The building was damaged by a large flood in 2002, and most of the archive materials were destroyed. The building currently awaits reconstruction. One possible future use is as an open space for culture and social life.

== In popular culture ==
The Invalidovna complex has served as a filming location for several notable movies, including the 1984 American drama film Amadeus directed by Miloš Forman, and Guillermo del Toro's 2004 film Hellboy. In 2023, Robert Eggers chose Invalidovna as one of the filming locations for his adaptation of Nosferatu, a modern interpretation of the classic vampire tale.

== Transport ==
The metro station Invalidovna is named after the building.
