= Karlín =

Cadastral area of Prague, Czech Republic

- Cadastral Area of Prague
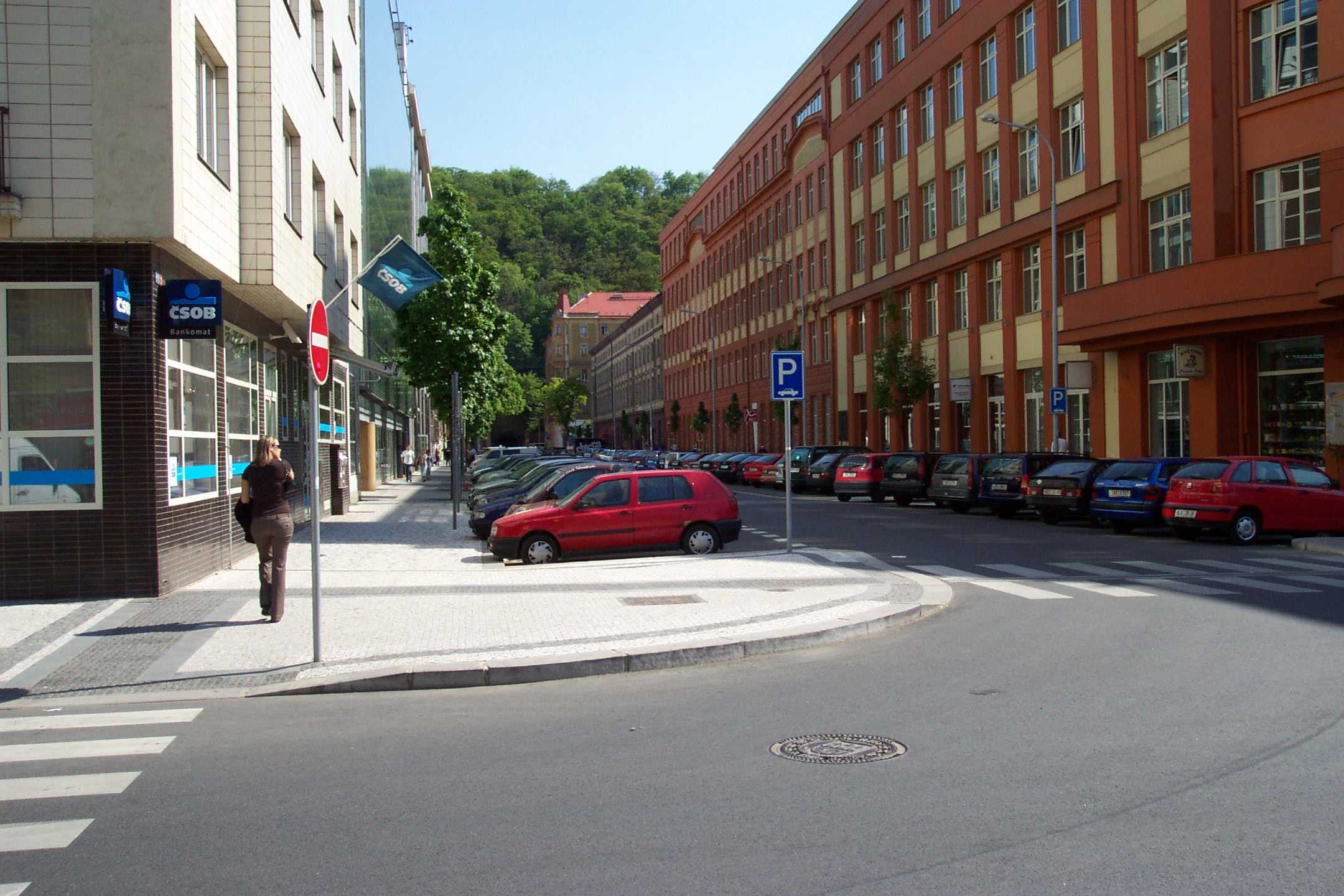
- Thámova Street in Karlín, renovated after 2002 floods

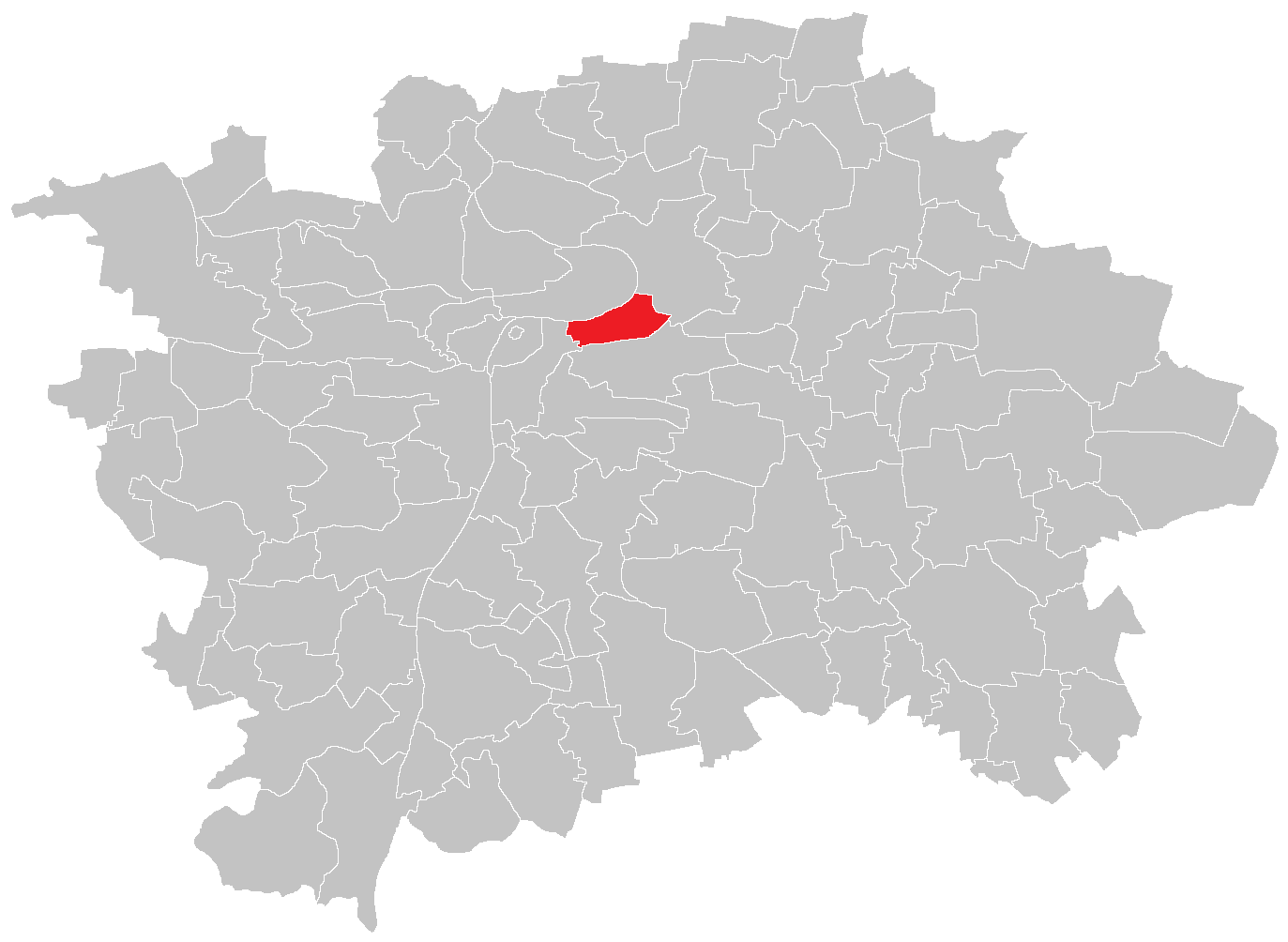
- Location of Karlín in Prague
- Coordinates: 50°5′31″N 14°26′43″E
- Country: Czech Republic
- Region: Prague
- District: Prague 8

Area
  - Total: 2.16 km^{2} (0.83 sq mi)

Population (2021)
  - Total: 12,261
  - Density: 5,680/km^{2} (14,700/sq mi)
- Time zone: UTC+1 (CET)
  - Summer (DST): UTC+2 (CEST)
- Postal code: 180 00

Karlín (German: Karolinenthal) is a cadastral area of Prague, part of Prague 8 municipal district, formerly an independent town (which became part of Prague in 1922). It is bordered by the river Vltava and Holešovice to the north, Vítkov hill and Žižkov to the south, New Town to the west and Libeň to the east.

== History ==
The building of the Karlín district began in 1817, surrounding the Rosarium of the Knights of the Cross with the Red Star. The new settlement was named after the fourth wife of Emperor Francis I of Austria, Caroline Augusta of Bavaria.

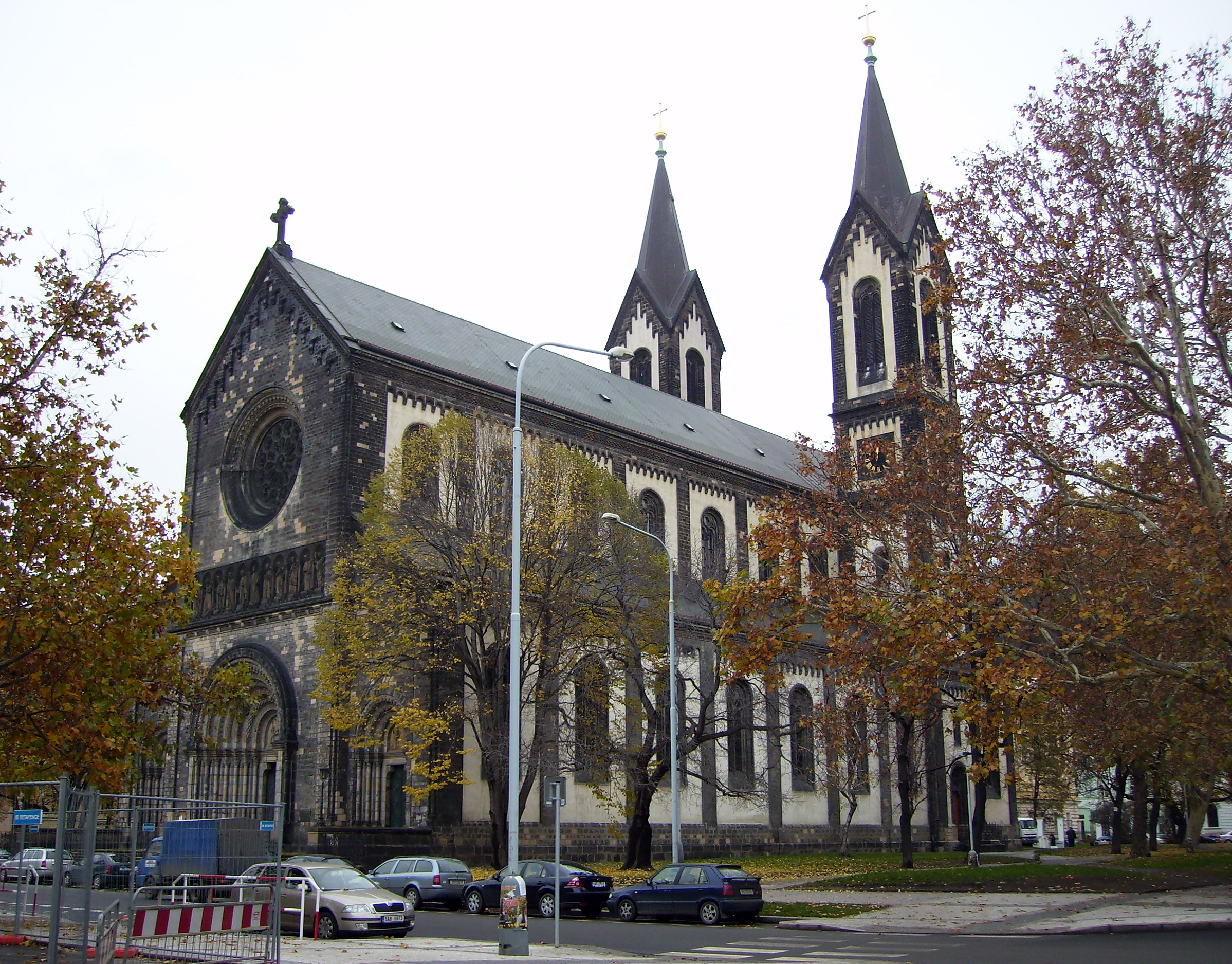
Saints Cyril and Methodius Church

After the demolition of the city walls, the properties in Karlín were counted among the cheapest properties of Prague. For that reason, the number of industrial enterprises and dwellings grew very quickly in the area of "Rohan Island" (Rohanský ostrov). On 1 January 1922 Karlín was incorporated into Prague. At this time, the electrical engineering pioneer and industrialist František Křižík had great influence in the area. He established a streetcar line, which he then sold to the city.

In the 1970s, traffic was rerouted onto the Rohanské nábřeží and the main arterial road was relieved. Since 1990 Karlín is connected to the Prague Metro by Křižíková station named after Křižík, and a pedestrian zone has been established as well. In 2002 Karlín was severely affected by the 100-year flood. It has since recovered and is becoming a new destination for businesses and residences.

== Notable buildings ==
A notable building in Karlín is the Karlín Railway Bridge, which connects the Masaryk Railway Station to the Bubny station. The viaduct (also called Karlín viaduct) was named after Alois Negrelli, it is 1,111 metres (3,645 ft) long and was put into operation on 1 June 1850. It is the longest bridge/viaduct on Czech territory.

Other notable buildings include:

- Theater Karlín (Karlínské hudební divadlo)
- Hotel Olympik
- Hotel Hilton Prague
- House of the Invalid (Invalidovna)
- Church of Saints Cyril and Methodius (Kostel Sv. Cyrila a Metoděje)
- Danube House
- Czech Statistical Office (Český statistický úřad)
- Karlín Synagogue

== Demographics ==
Historical population

Year	Pop.	±%
1869	13,384	—
1880	17,250	+28.9%
1890	19,540	+13.3%
1900	21,555	+10.3%
1910	24,230	+12.4%

Year	Pop.	±%
1921	25,051	+3.4%
1930	24,002	−4.2%
1950	21,779	−9.3%
1961	22,547	+3.5%
1970	21,246	−5.8%

Year	Pop.	±%
1980	17,241	−18.9%
1991	14,240	−17.4%
2001	12,326	−13.4%
2011	11,161	−9.5%
2021	12,261	+9.9%

Source: Censuses

== Notable people ==
- Lucia Moholy (born Schulz 18 January 1894, Karolinenthal bei Prag; died 17 May 1989, Zollikon, Switzerland) photographer, documentarist, publicist
- Franz Baermann Steiner (born 12 October 1909; died 17 November 1952, Oxford, England) ethnologist, polymath, essayist, aphorist, and poet.
