= Černý Most (Prague Metro) =

Prague metro station

Coordinates: 50°06′33″N 14°34′39″E

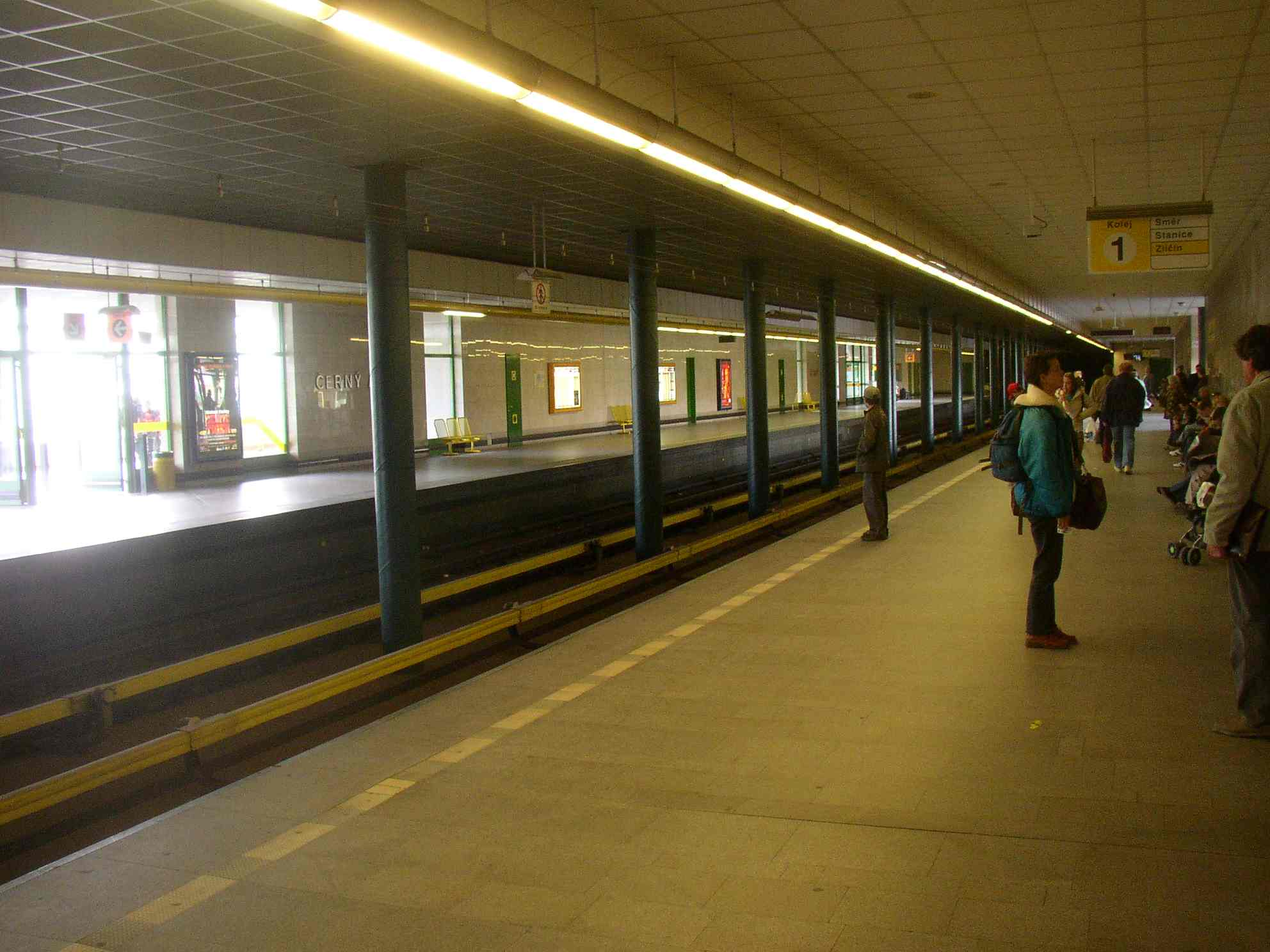

General information
- Location: Chlumecká street Černý Most, Prague 14; Prague; Czech Republic
- System: Prague Metro
- Platforms: 2 side platforms
- Tracks: 2

Construction
- Structure type: At grade
- Depth: 24 m (79 ft)
- Accessible: Yes

Other information
- Fare zone: PID: P

History
- Opened: 8 November 1998; 27 years ago

Services
Preceding station	Prague Metro	Following station
Rajská zahrada toward Zličín	Line B	Terminus
Location

Černý Most (Czech pronunciation: [tʃɛrniː most], English: Black Bridge) is a Prague Metro station and terminus of Line B, serving the Černý Most housing estate and shopping district and nearby suburbs of Prague. The station was opened on 8 November 1998 as the eastern terminus of the extension of Line B from Českomoravská.

The station is directly adjacent to an intercity bus terminal. Not only it is one of few Prague Metro subway stations that is not located underground, its vestibule is located even higher than the main stands and roads of the bus terminal.
