= Prague 8 =

Prague 8 Praha 8
- Municipal District of Prague; Administrative District of Prague
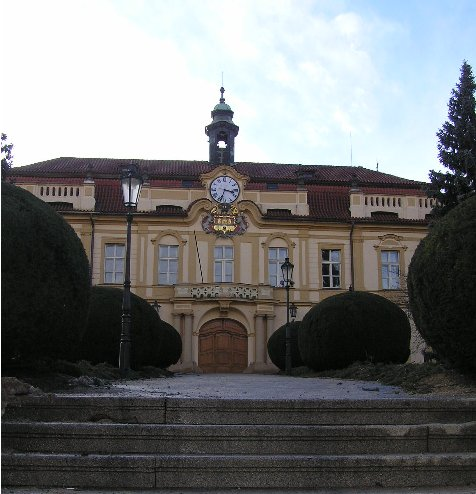
- Chateau Libeň

- Flag Coat of arms

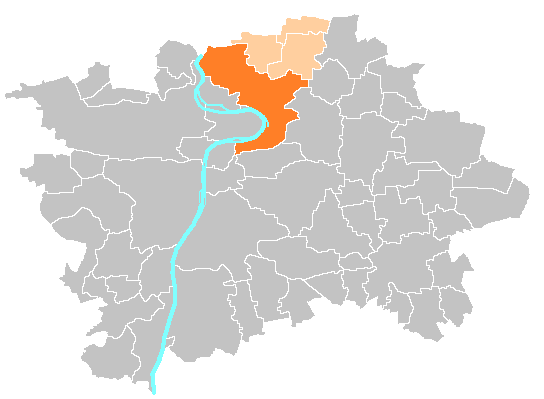
- Location of Prague 8 in Prague
- Coordinates: 50°6′28″N 14°28′17″E
- Country: Czech Republic
- Region: Prague

Government
  - Mayor: Tomáš Hřebík (STAN)

Area
  - Total: 21.80 km^{2} (8.42 sq mi)

Population (2021)
  - Total: 104,921 people 4,958 dogs
  - Density: 4,813/km^{2} (12,470/sq mi)
- Time zone: UTC+1 (CET)
  - Summer (DST): UTC+2 (CEST)
- Postal code: 180 00
- Website: http://www.praha8.cz

Prague 8 is a municipal district (městská část) in Prague, Czech Republic.

The administrative district (správní obvod) of the same name consists of municipal districts Prague 8, Březiněves, Ďáblice and Dolní Chabry.

== Demographics ==
Historical population
Year	Pop.	±%
1869	20,371	—
1880	28,233	+38.6%
1890	33,885	+20.0%
1900	46,128	+36.1%
1910	57,476	+24.6%
1921	61,884	+7.7%
1930	76,642	+23.8%
1950	80,781	+5.4%
1961	78,702	−2.6%
1970	69,446	−11.8%
1980	121,142	+74.4%
1991	112,790	−6.9%
2001	102,761	−8.9%
2011	104,918	+2.1%
2021	104,921	+0.0%
Source: Censuses

== See also ==
- Districts of Prague § Symbols
