= Zličín (Prague Metro) =

Prague metro station

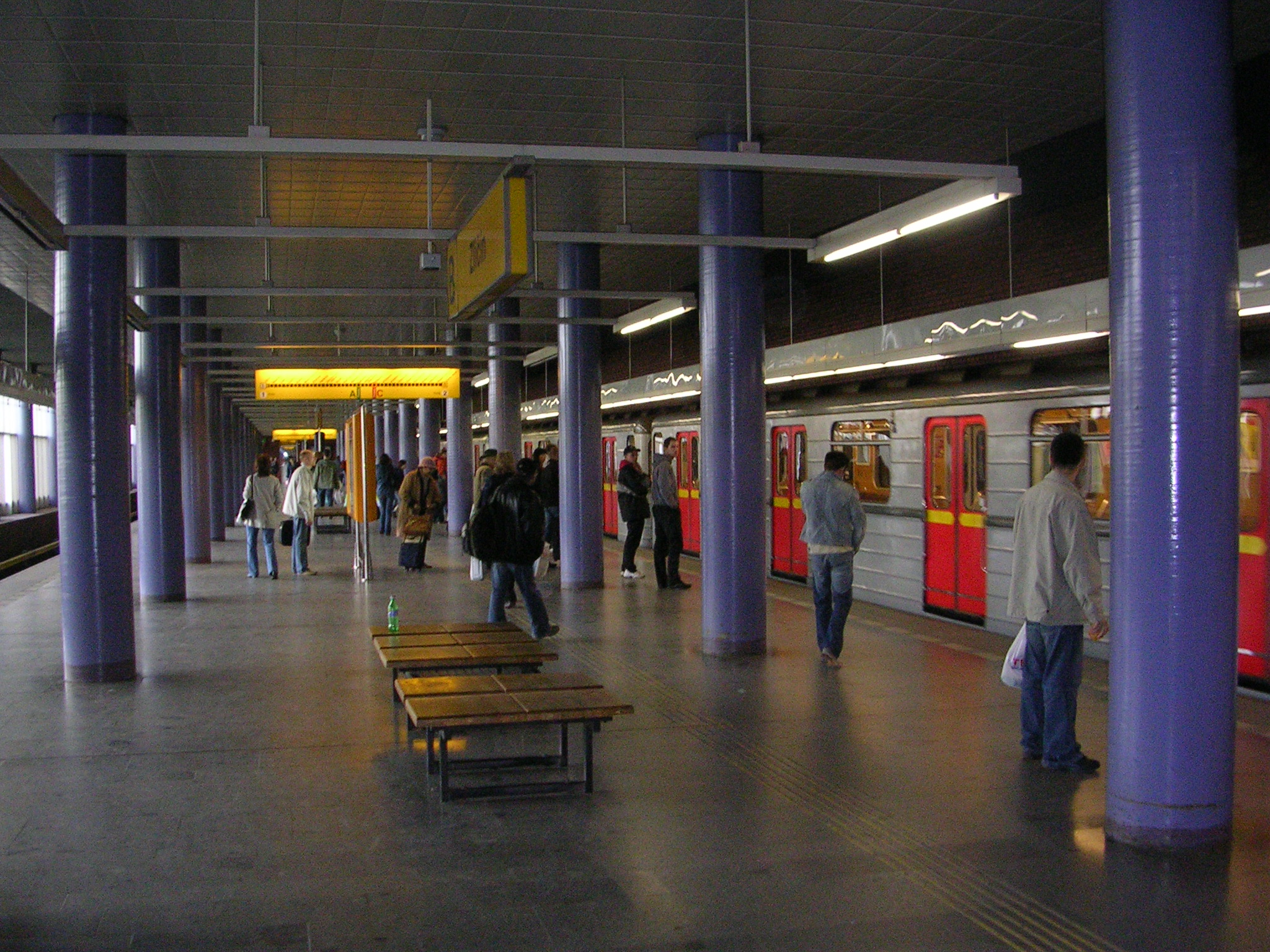
- Platform

General information
- Location: Řevnická; Prague 17 - Třebonice; Prague; Czech Republic
- Coordinates: 50.054°N 14.291°E
- System: Prague Metro
- Owner: Dopravní podnik hl. m. Prahy
- Line: B
- Platforms: Island platform
- Tracks: 2

Construction
- Structure type: At grade
- Depth: 72 m (236 ft)
- Platform levels: 1
- Cycle facilities: No
- Accessible: Yes

Other information
- Fare zone: PID: P

History
- Opened: 11 November 1994; 31 years ago

Services
Preceding station	Prague Metro	Following station
Terminus	Line B	Stodůlky toward Černý Most
Location
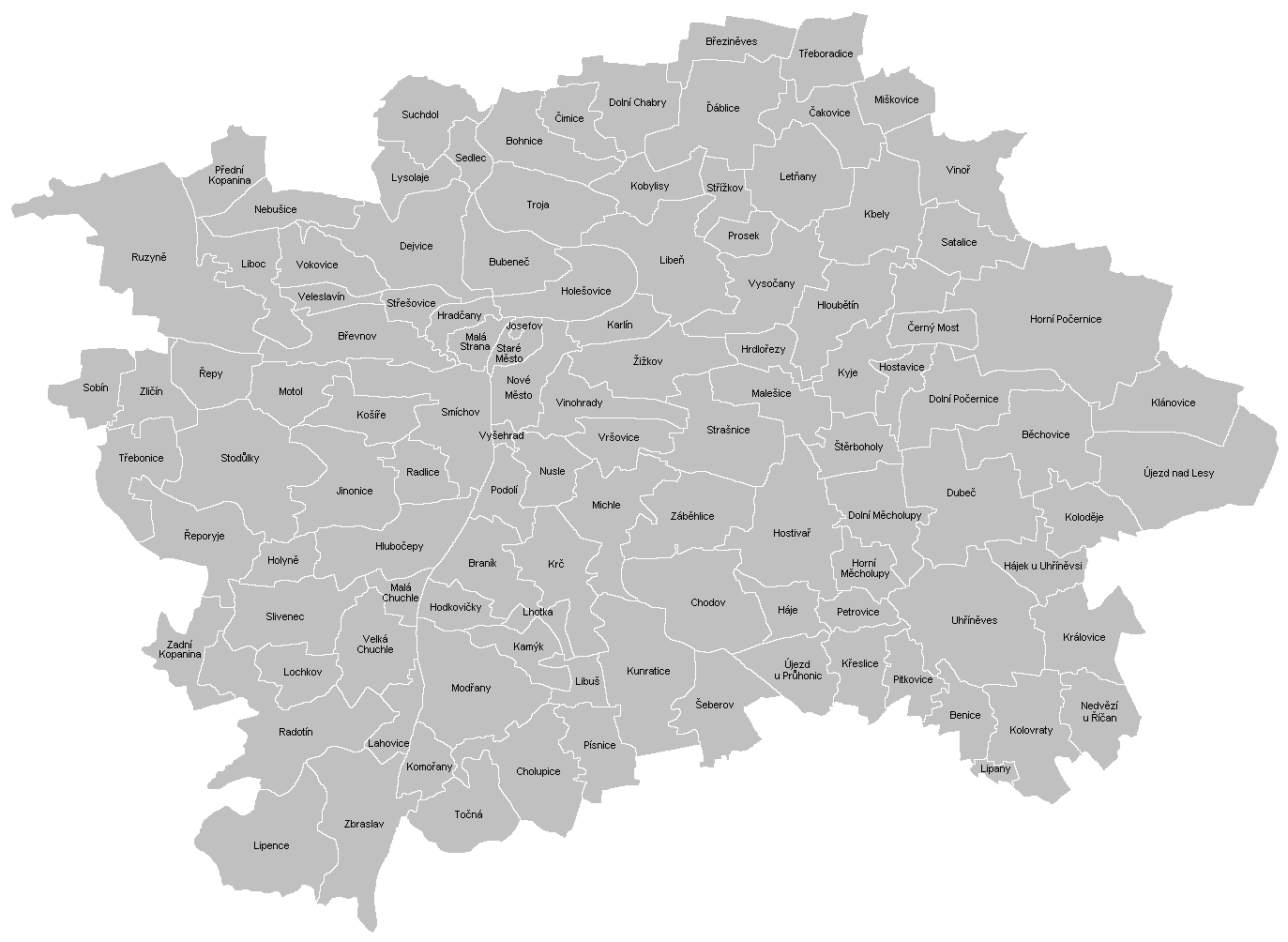
- Location within Greater Prague Location within Czech Republic

Zličín (Czech pronunciation: [ˈzlɪtʃiːn]) is a Prague Metro station and terminus of Line B, located in Třebonice, Prague 17. The station was opened on 11 November 1994 as the western terminus of the extension of Line B from Nové Butovice. Zličín metro station gives direct pedestrian access to the 2004 constructed Metropole shopping mall, and has zero-fare bus links to the nearby Globus, Tesco and Ikea hypermarkets.

The station's metro lines feed into a large shed with direct rail connections to the adjacent former Siemens train and tram factory which was closed in 2009.

Zličín metro station is located next to a junction between the Prague ring road and the D5 motorway and offers direct connections with local, regional and national buses, both public transport and commercial Student Agency Express buses. The nearest Prague tram network hub is at Řepy, reached by bus lines 264 or 180 (4 stops away). Bus line 100 provides frequent connections to Václav Havel Airport, 16 minutes away. Bus line 380 provides connections to Beroun.
