= Line B (Prague Metro) =

Metro line in Prague, Czech Republic

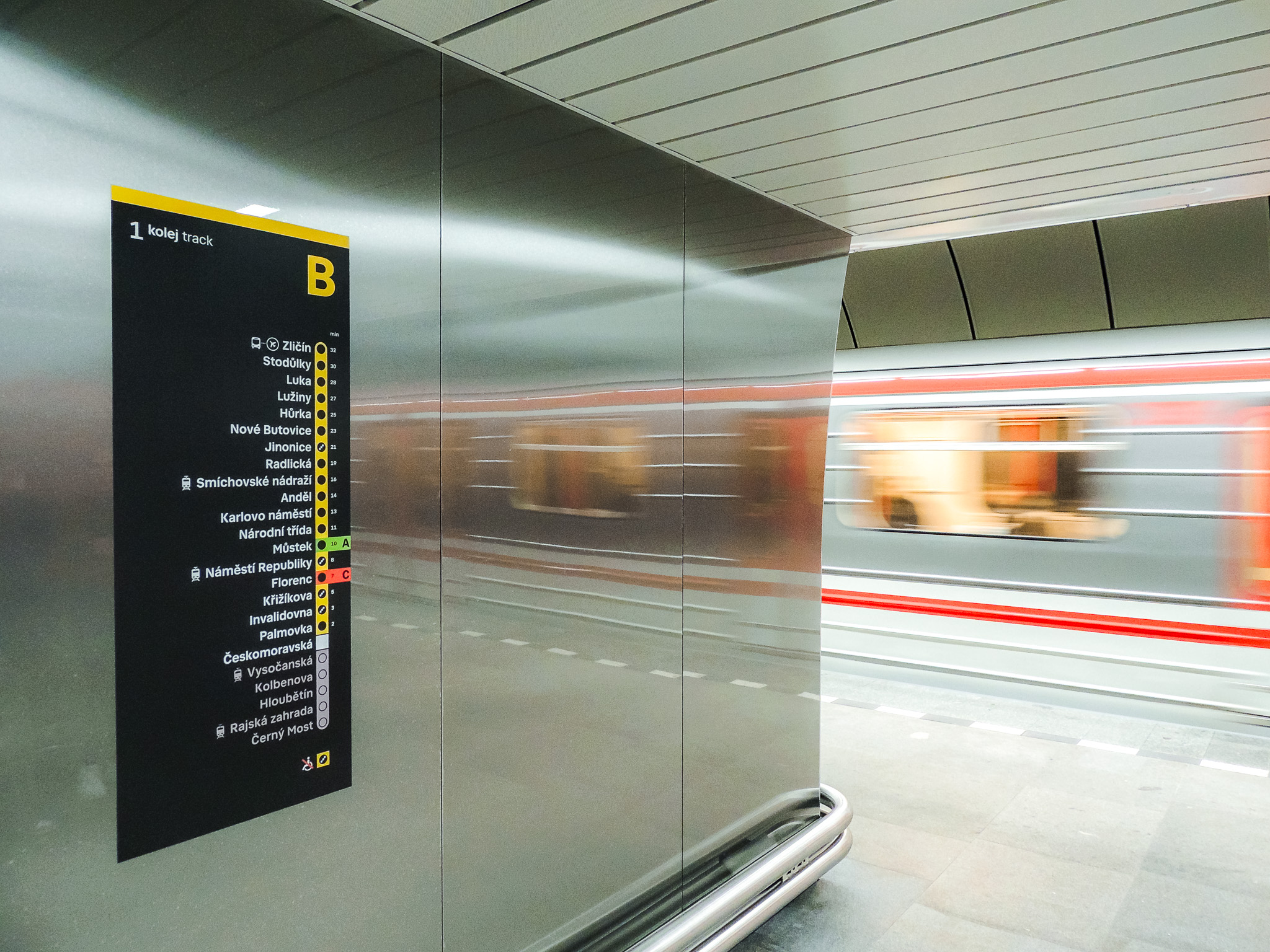
- Českomoravská station

Overview
- Owner: Prague Public Transit Company
- Locale: Prague, Czech Republic
- Stations: 24

Service
- Type: Rapid transit
- System: Prague Metro

History
- Opened: 2 November 1985; 40 years ago
- Last extension: 1998

Technical
- Line length: 25.6 km (15.9 mi)
- Num of tracks: Double
- Character: Underground
- Track gauge: 1,435 mm (4 ft 8 1/2 in) standard gauge

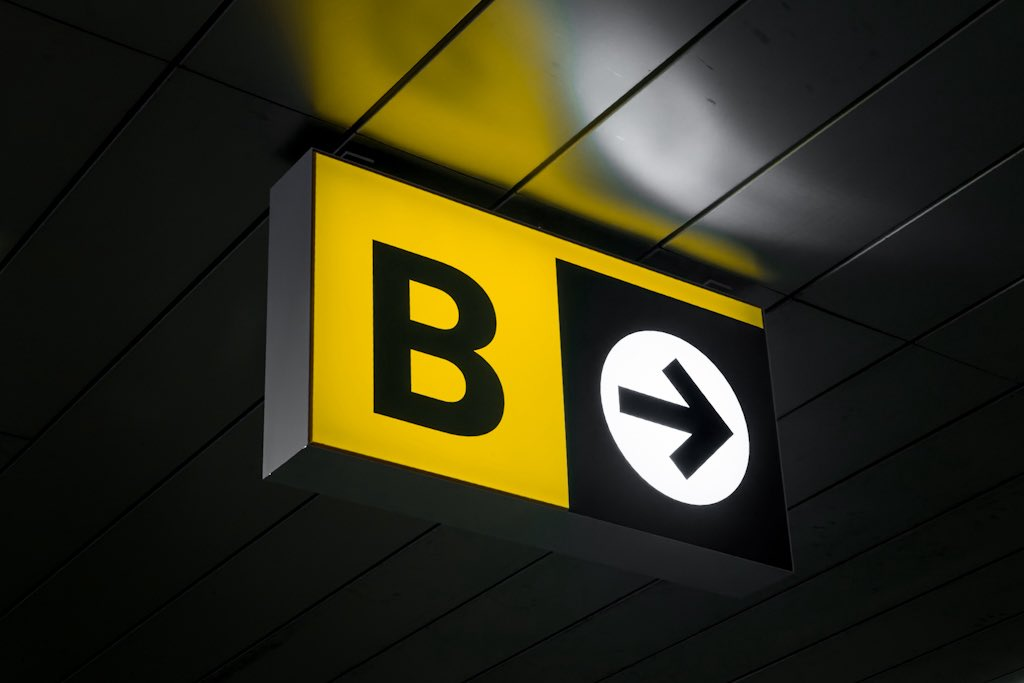
Wayfinding signage on Line B

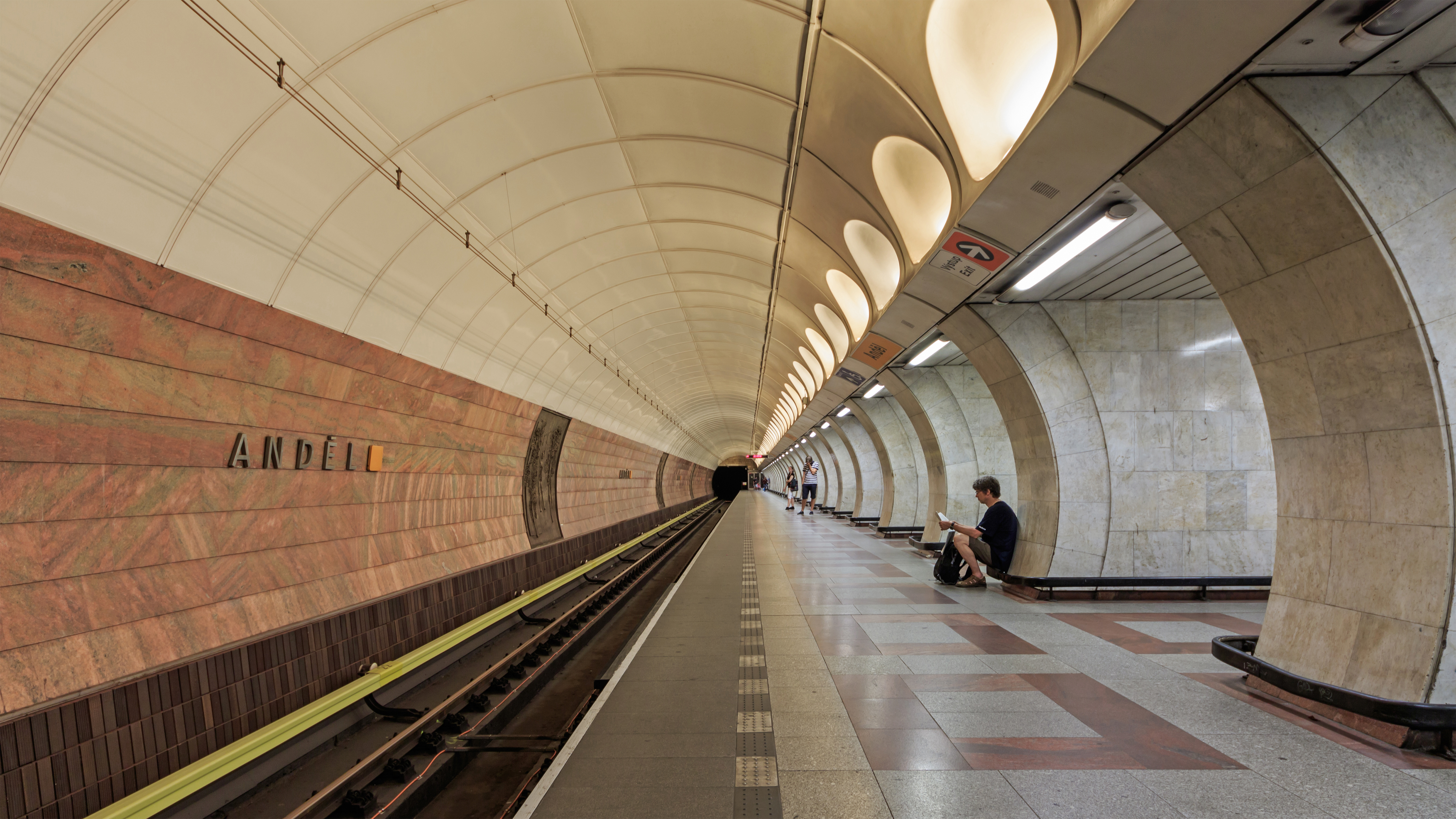
Station Anděl (Angel)

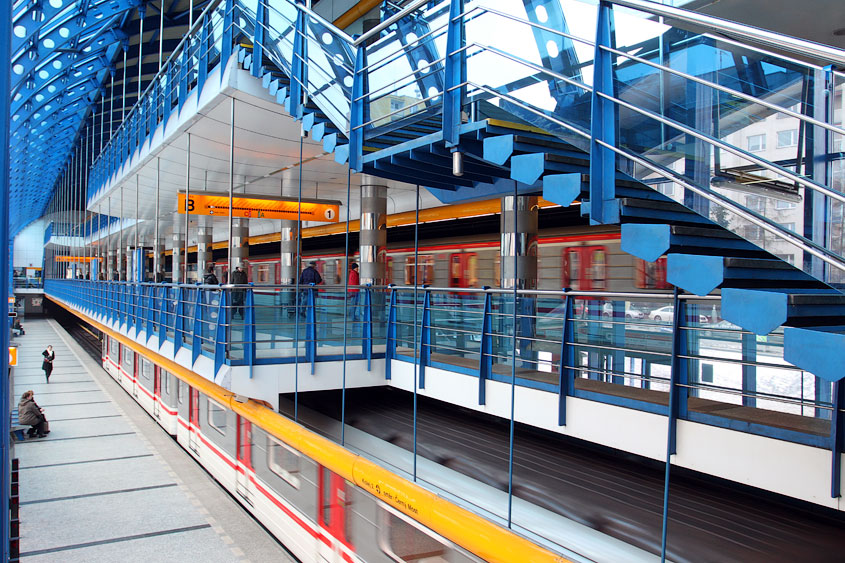
Station Rajská zahrada

Line B (Czech: Linka B) is a line on the Prague Metro. Chronologically the third to open, it was first opened in 1985 and continued to expand in the 1990s. Currently it is the longest line in the network with 24 stations and 25.6 kilometres (15.9 mi) of track.

== History ==
The first section (named the IB) was opened on 2 November 1985 at a length of 4.9 kilometres (3.0 mi). It had seven stations – from Florenc, where it connected to the oldest line C, to Smíchovské nádraží

After a year of renovations, Českomoravská Metro station reopened on 20 March 2026.

| Segment | Date opened | Length |
|---|---|---|
| Florenc-Smíchovské nádraží | November 2, 1985 | 4.9 km (3.0 mi) |
| Smíchovské nádraží-Nové Butovice | October 26, 1988 | 4.9 km |
| Florenc-Českomoravská | November 22, 1990 | 4.4 km (2.7 mi) |
| Nové Butovice-Zličín | November 11, 1994 | 5.1 km (3.2 mi) |
| Českomoravská-Černý Most | November 8, 1998 | 6.3 km (3.9 mi) |
| Hloubětín | June 8, 1999 | N/A |
| Kolbenova | June 26, 2001 | N/A |
| Total: | 24 stations | 25.6 km |
