= Hůrka (Prague Metro) =

Prague metro station

Coordinates: 50.050°N 14.343°E

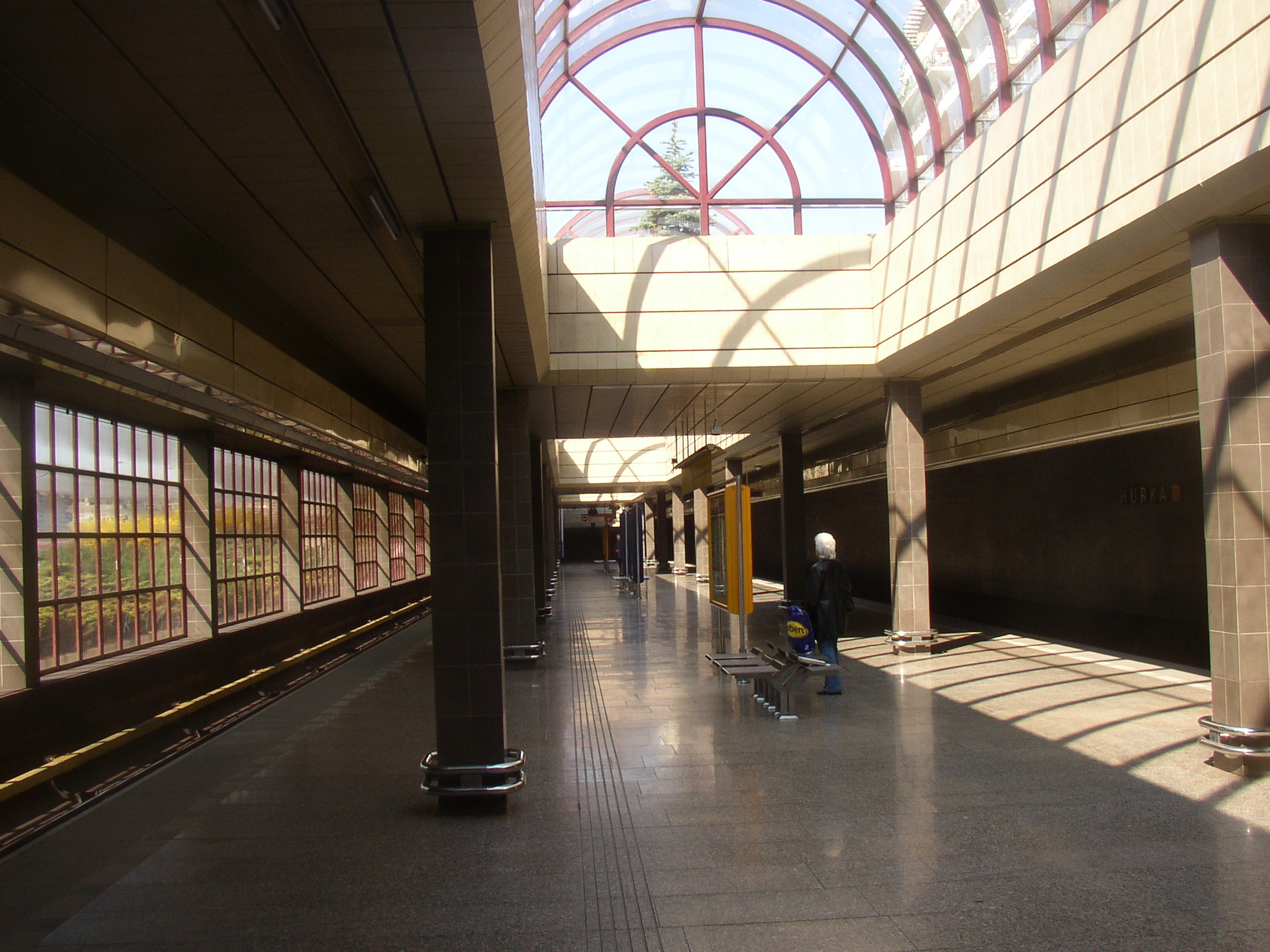

General information
- Location: Sluneční náměstí Stodůlky, Prague 13; Prague; Czech Republic
- System: Prague Metro
- Platforms: 1 island platform
- Tracks: 2

Construction
- Structure type: Below grade
- Depth: 485 m (1,591 ft)
- Accessible: Yes

Other information
- Fare zone: PID: Prague

History
- Opened: 11 November 1994; 31 years ago

Services
Preceding station	Prague Metro	Following station
Lužiny toward Zličín	Line B	Nové Butovice toward Černý Most
Location

Hůrka (Czech pronunciation: [ˈɦuːrka]) is a Prague Metro station on Line B, located in Stodůlky, Prague 13. The station was opened on 11 November 1994 as part of the extension of Line B from Nové Butovice to Zličín.
