= Prague Towers =

Two Czech highrise residential buildings in Prague district

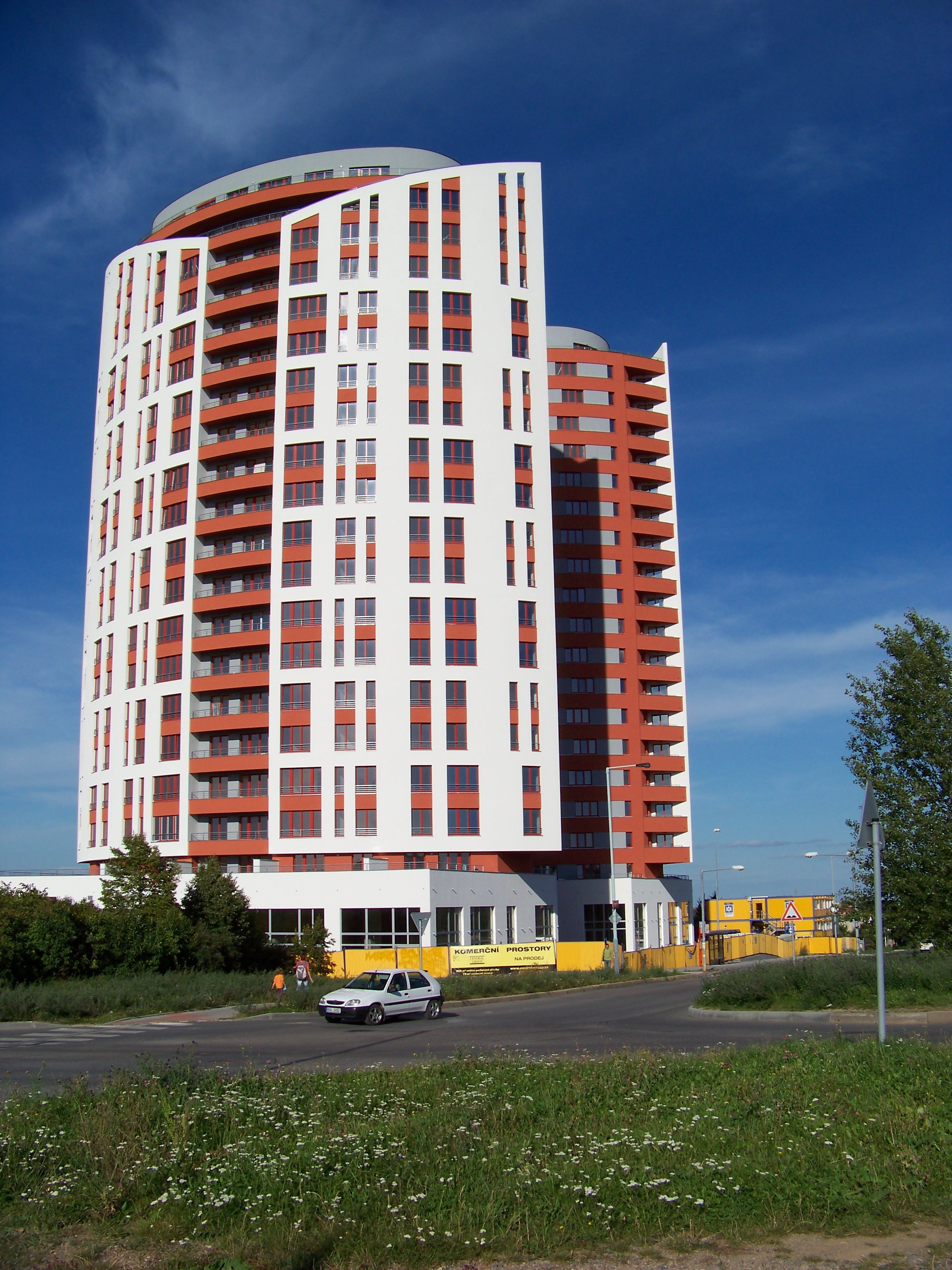
- Interactive map of the Prague Towers area

General information
- Status: Completed
- Type: Residences
- Location: Tlumačovská 2766, Prague, 155 00, Prague, Czech Republic
- Coordinates: 50°2′24.87″N 14°20′10.32″E
- Completed: 2011

Height
- Roof: 65 m (213 ft)

Technical details
- Floor count: 21

Design and construction
- Architects: Zdeněk Frey, Ivan Hořejší

Prague Towers (A and B) are two highrise residential buildings in Prague district Stodůlky, Czech Republic. They're located near Prokop valley and Dalejské údolí (valley). The nearest metro station is Lužiny, 600m far. This building was built by Czech developer Central Group. Both buildings have around 300 flats, height 65m, 21 floors. Towers were built in 2011.
