= Stodůlky =

- Cadastral area of Prague
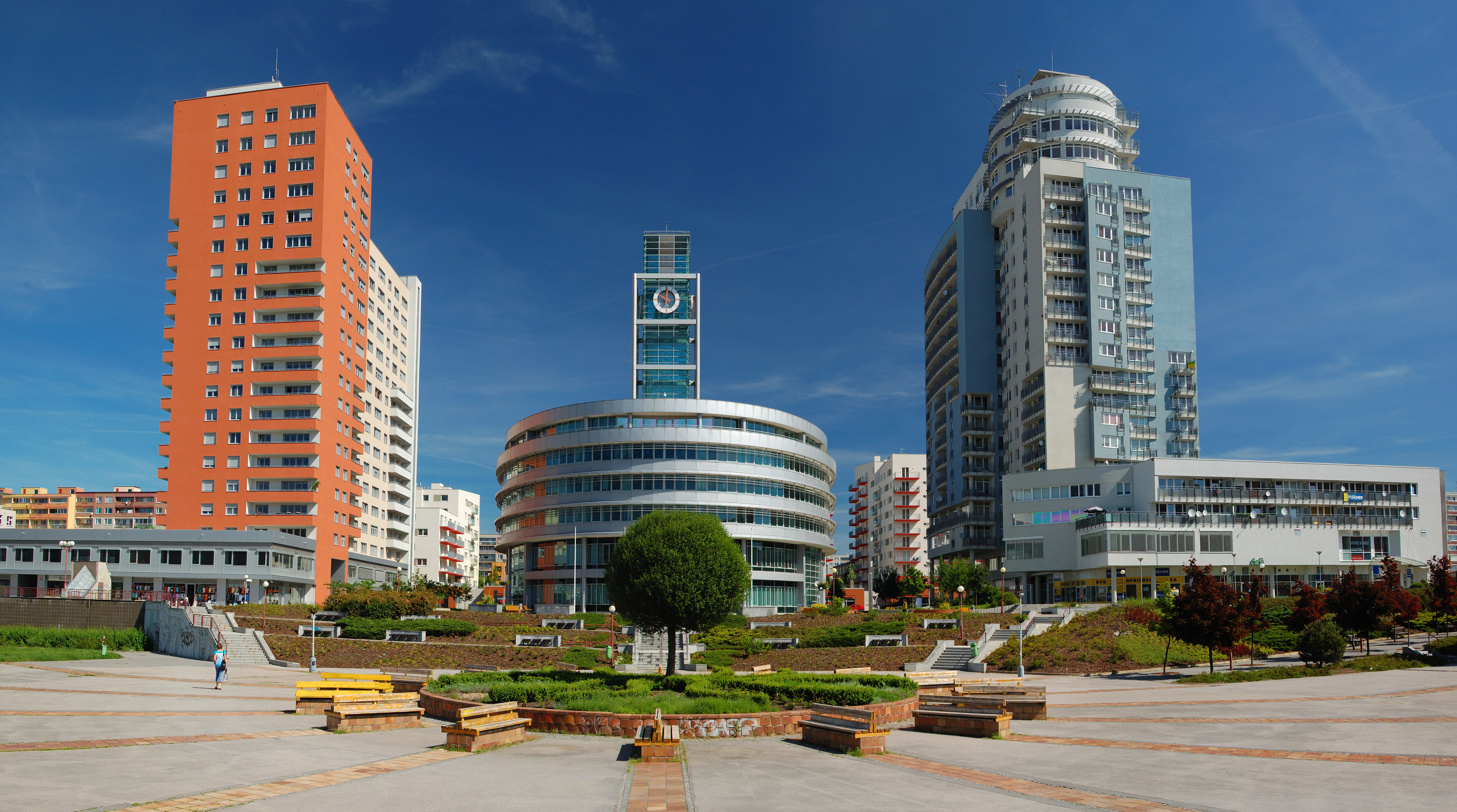
- Town hall of Prague 13 in Sluneční náměstí (Sun Square)

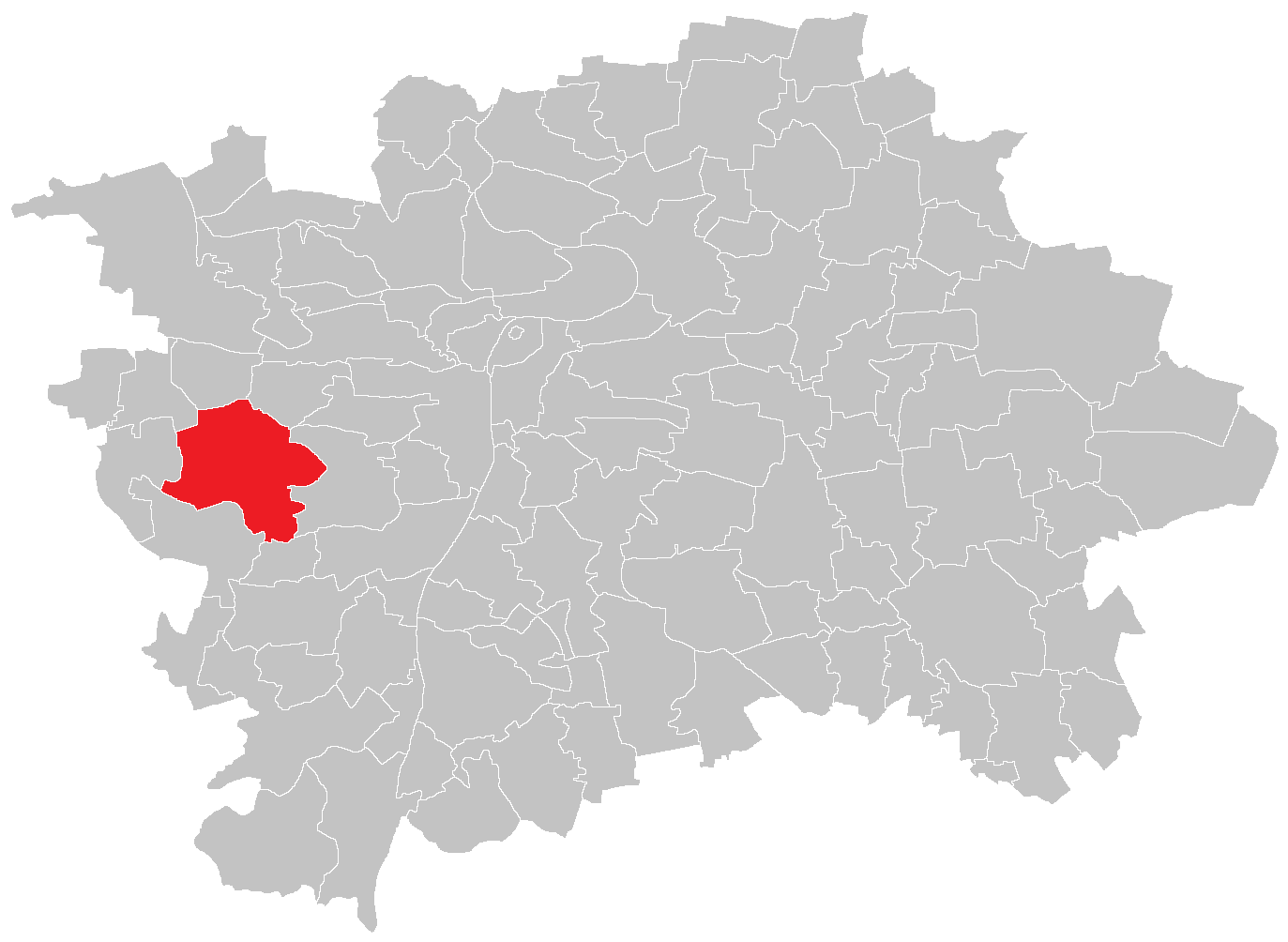
- Location of Stodůlky in Prague
- Coordinates: 50°03′01″N 14°19′30″E
- Country: Czech Republic
- Region: Prague
- District: Prague 13, Prague-Řeporyje

Area
  - Total: 9.62 km^{2} (3.71 sq mi)

Population (2021)
  - Total: 60,758
  - Density: 6,320/km^{2} (16,400/sq mi)
- Time zone: UTC+1 (CET)
  - Summer (DST): UTC+2 (CEST)
- Postal code: 155 00

Stodůlky, Czech pronunciation: [ˈstoduːlkɪ], is a cadastral area in Prague, Czech Republic. Originally a village, first written mention of which dates from 1159, later municipality (since 1849), it remained a predominantly agricultural settlement until the 1960s. Stodůlky became part of Prague in 1974 and the large housing estate of Jihozápadní Město gradually arose on fields in vicinity of the old village in the late 1970s through mid-1990s.

Nowadays, Stodůlky covers an area of 9.62 square kilometres (3.71 sq mi) and has over 60,000 inhabitants, making Stodůlky the most populated cadastral area of Prague. Západní Město, a western extension of the built-up area is currently under construction as of 2011.

== Etymology ==
The name derives from the Czech noun stodola for barn; Stodůlky is then a pluralized diminutive of that word (i.e. meaning "small barns").

== Geography ==
Stodůlky is located at the southwestern outskirts of the city, about 9 kilometres (6 mi) from the centre. It borders cadastral areas of Řepy in the north, Motol in the northeast, Jinonice in the east, Holyně and Řeporyje in the south, Třebonice in the west and Zličín in the northwest. As a whole it belongs to Prague 5 territorial district. For administrative purposes the vast majority of Stodůlky is designated as an administrative district of Prague 13, while a small section of it falls under Prague-Řeporyje.

== Transport ==
Stodůlky is served by Line B of the Prague Metro with five stations being located on its territory (each station in general bears the name of the corresponding housing subdistrict). The stations are (in direction from city centre):

- Nové Butovice
- Hůrka
- Lužiny
- Luka
- Stodůlky

== Demographics ==
Historical population

Year	Pop.	±%
1869	765	—
1880	830	+8.5%
1890	1,017	+22.5%
1900	1,132	+11.3%
1910	1,303	+15.1%

Year	Pop.	±%
1921	1,309	+0.5%
1930	2,641	+101.8%
1950	3,062	+15.9%
1961	3,173	+3.6%
1970	3,506	+10.5%

Year	Pop.	±%
1980	3,414	−2.6%
1991	35,489	+939.5%
2001	52,101	+46.8%
2011	59,742	+14.7%
2021	60,758	+1.7%

Source: Censuses

== Gallery ==
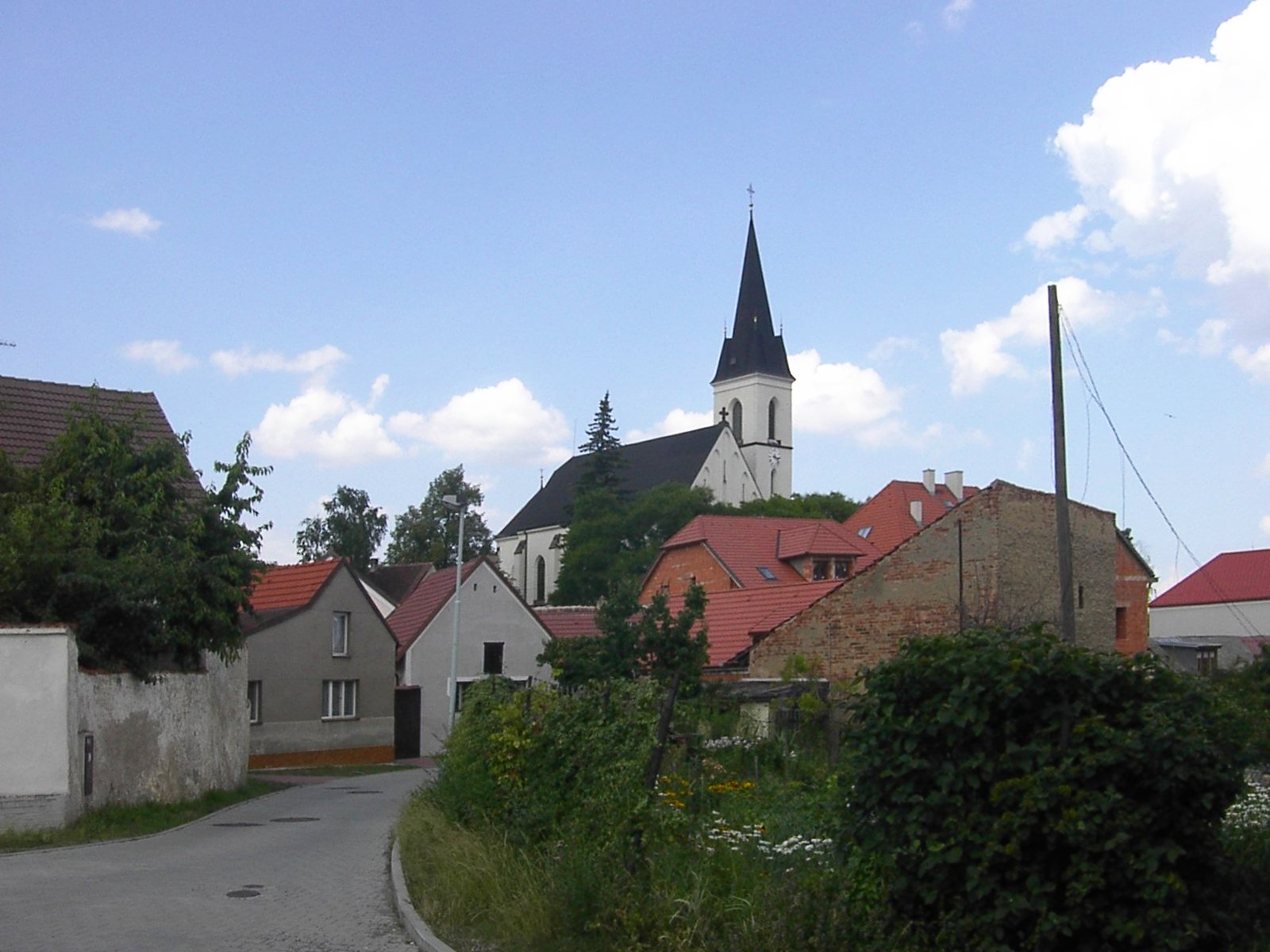
Old part of Stodůlky with church of St. James the Great. History of the church dates at least to 13th century but the current Gothic Revival edifice is much more recent (1902-3)

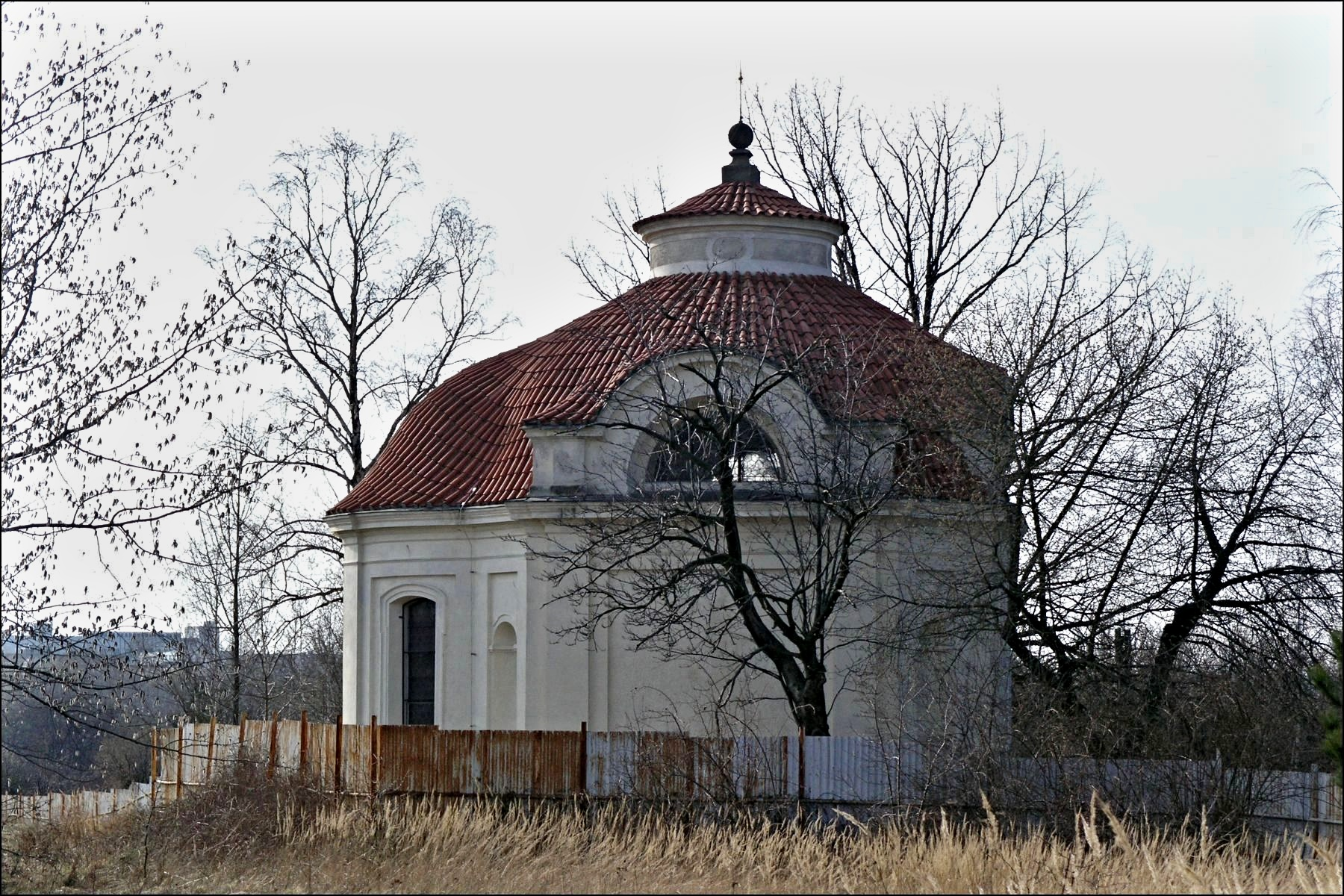
Baroque circular chapel of Finding of the Holy Cross (attributed to K. I. Dientzenhofer and built 1743-1754) stands in a remote location on halfway between Stodůlky and Řepy.

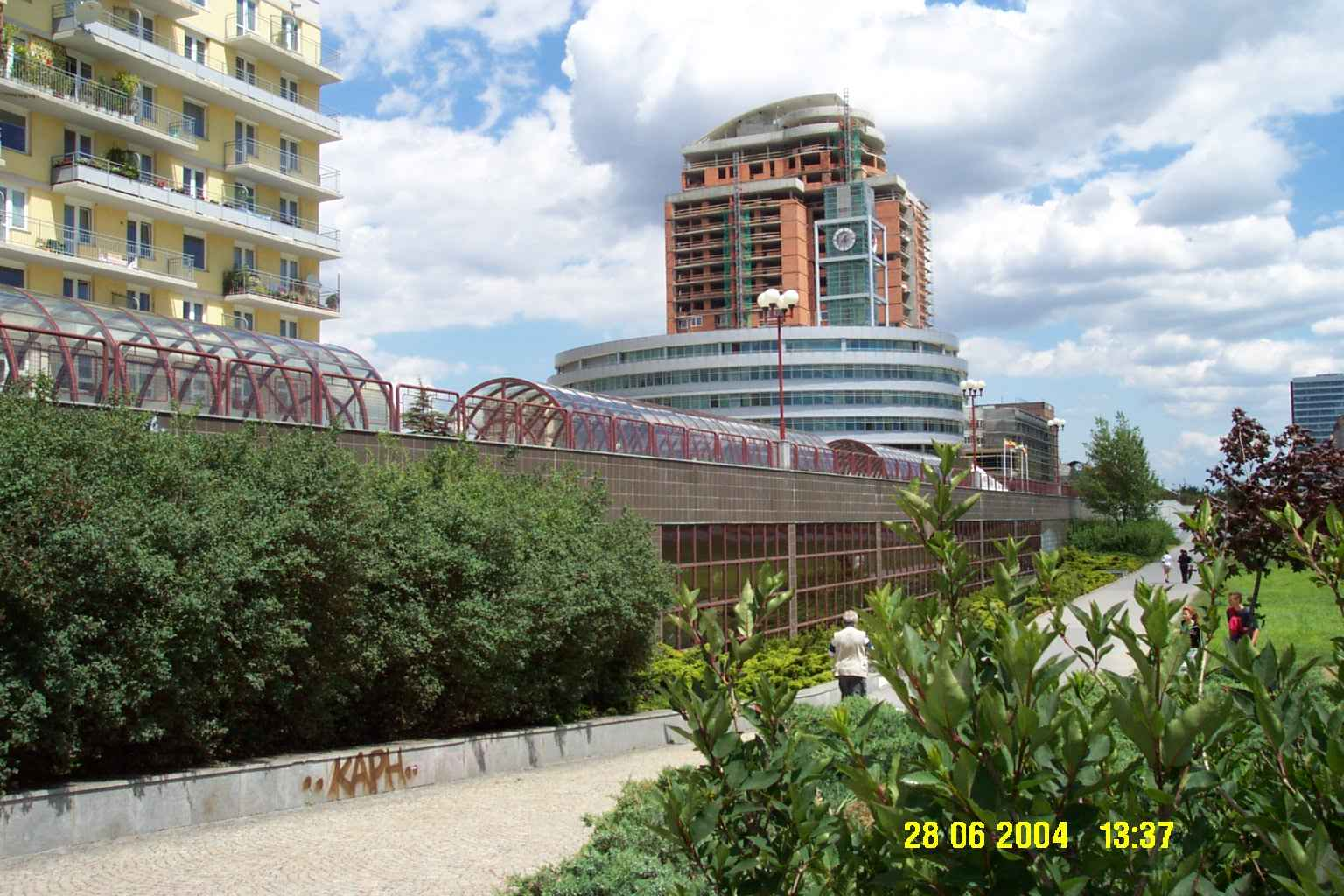
Surface view of Hůrka metro station

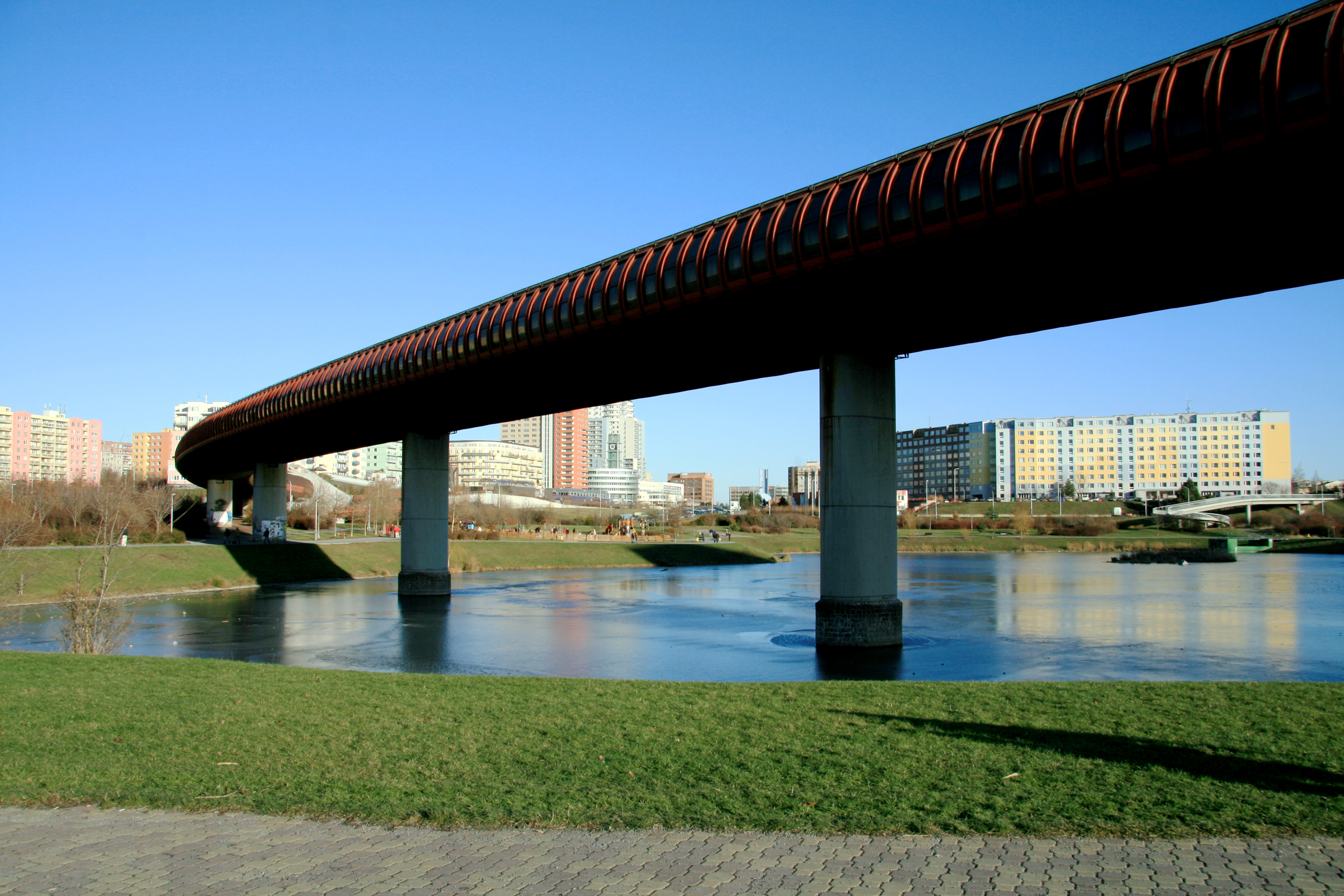
Most of Prague metro network runs underground. Here is a rare surface section in closed tube spanning Central Park in Stodůlky.

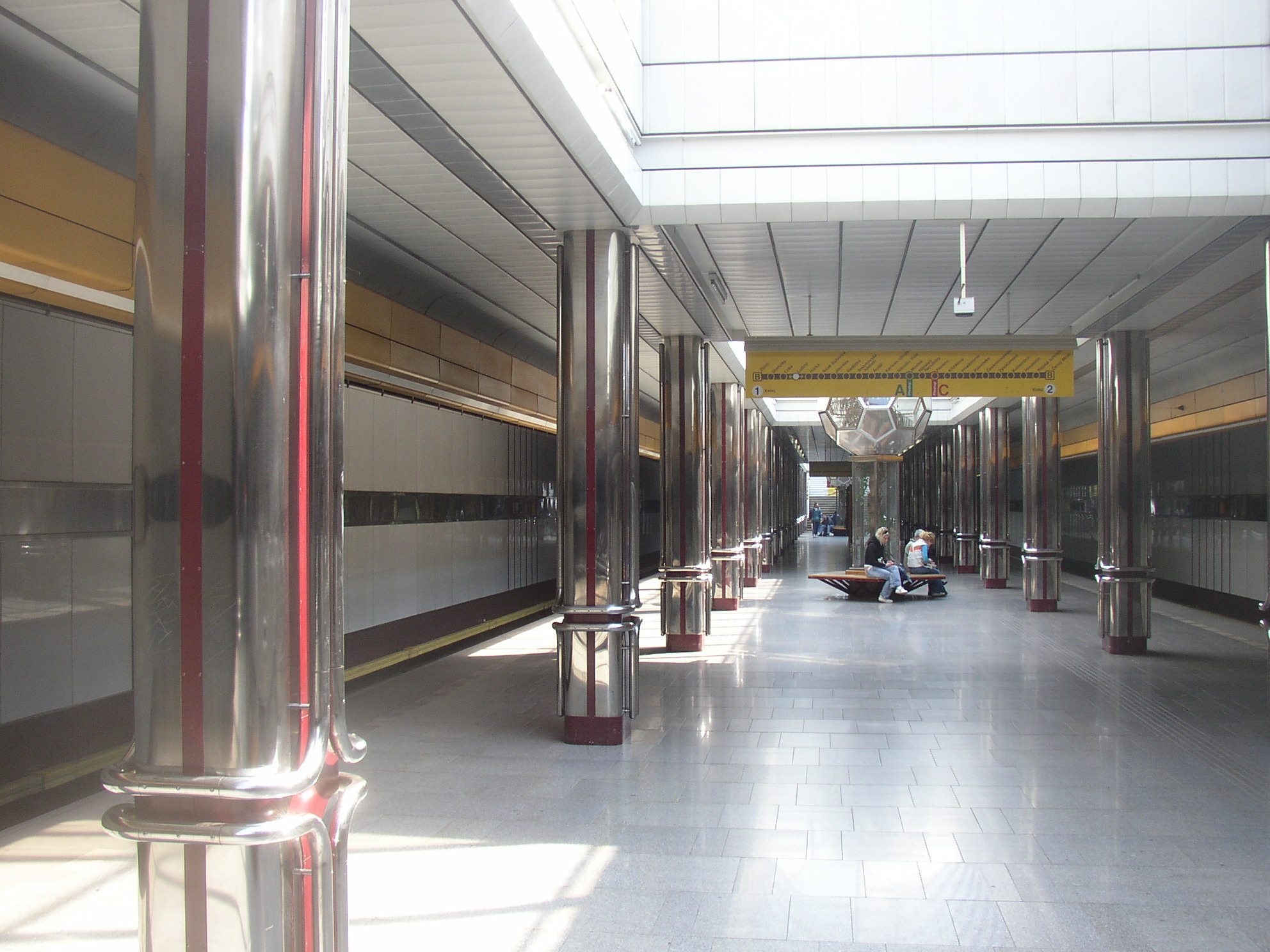
Lužiny metro station

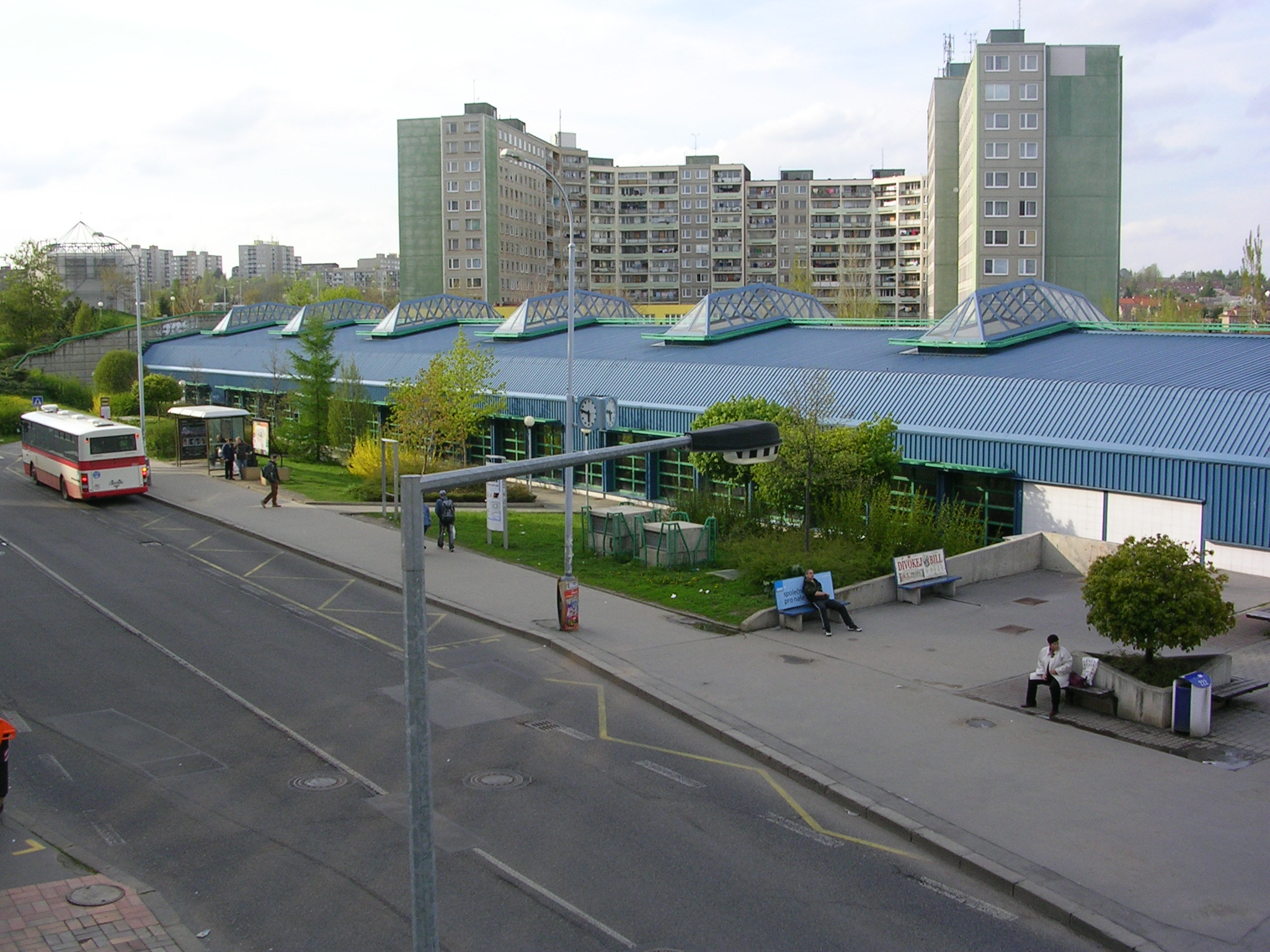
Exterior of Luka metro station

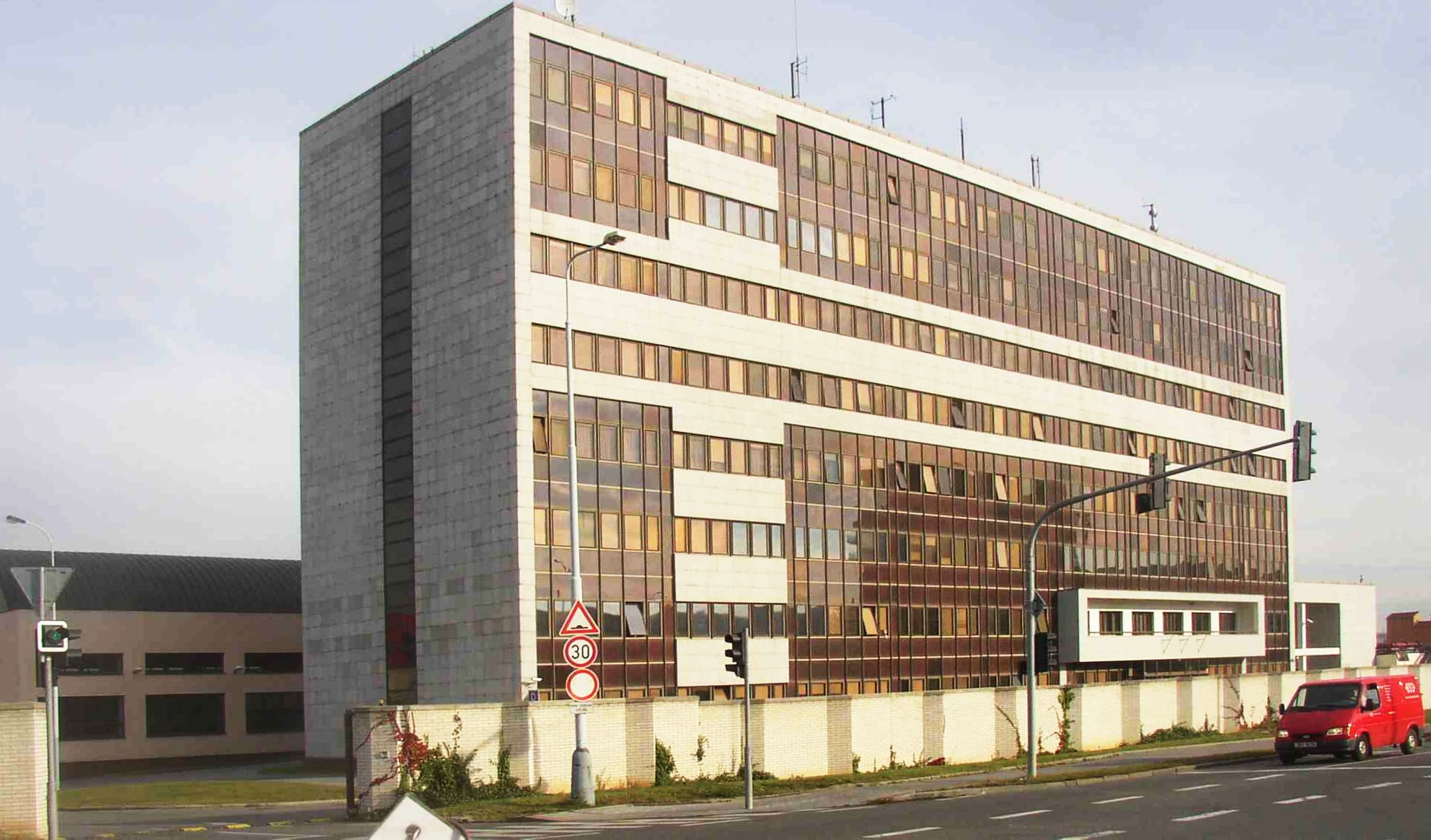
Headquarters of BIS, the domestic secret service of the Czech Republic

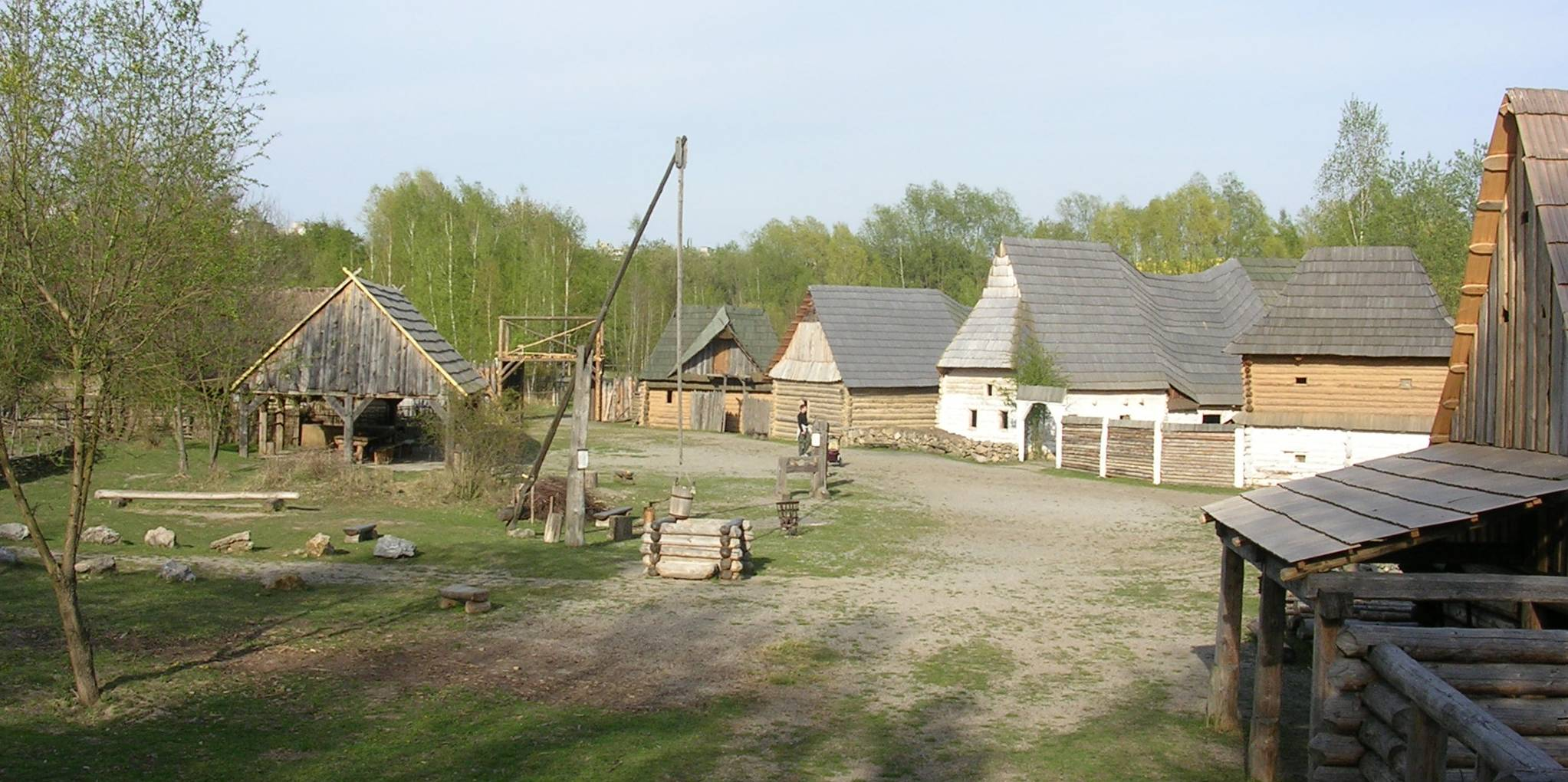
Řepora, a replica of a 14th-century rural settlement, is located in an abandoned claypit between Stodůlky and Řeporyje

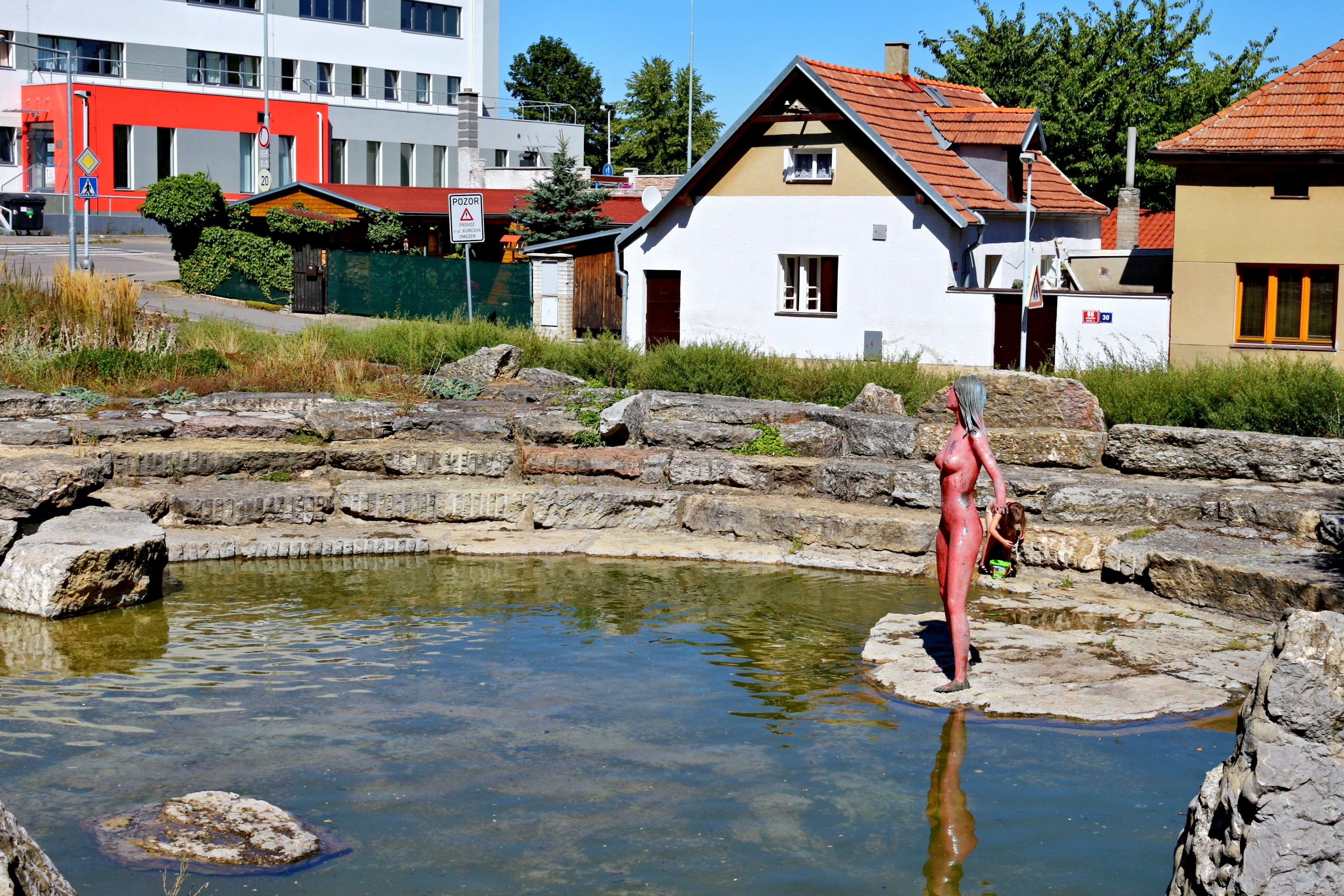
Artificial pond and statue of Rusalka in Stodůlky

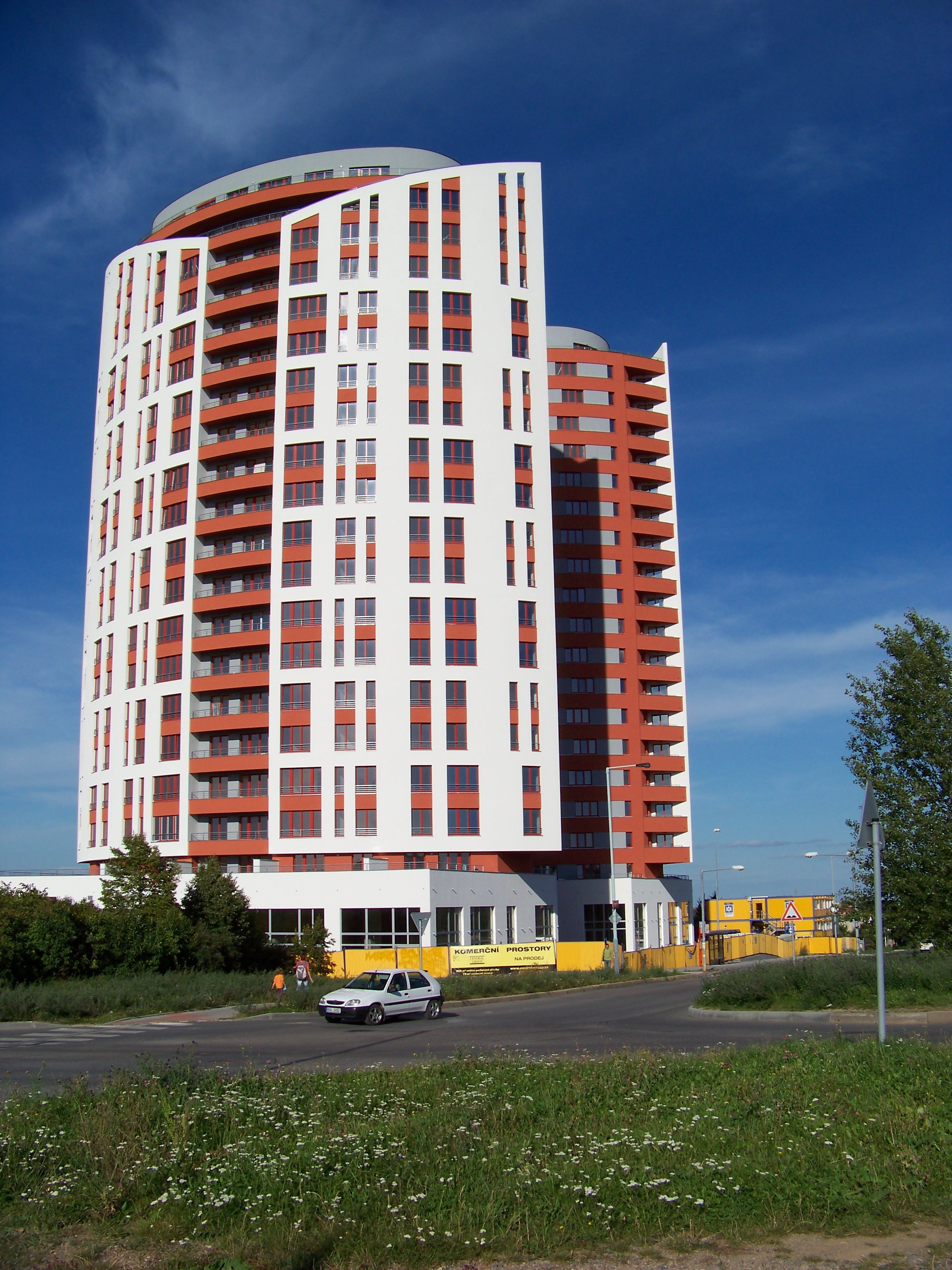
Prague Towers - residential towers
