= Holyně =

- Cadastral Area of Prague
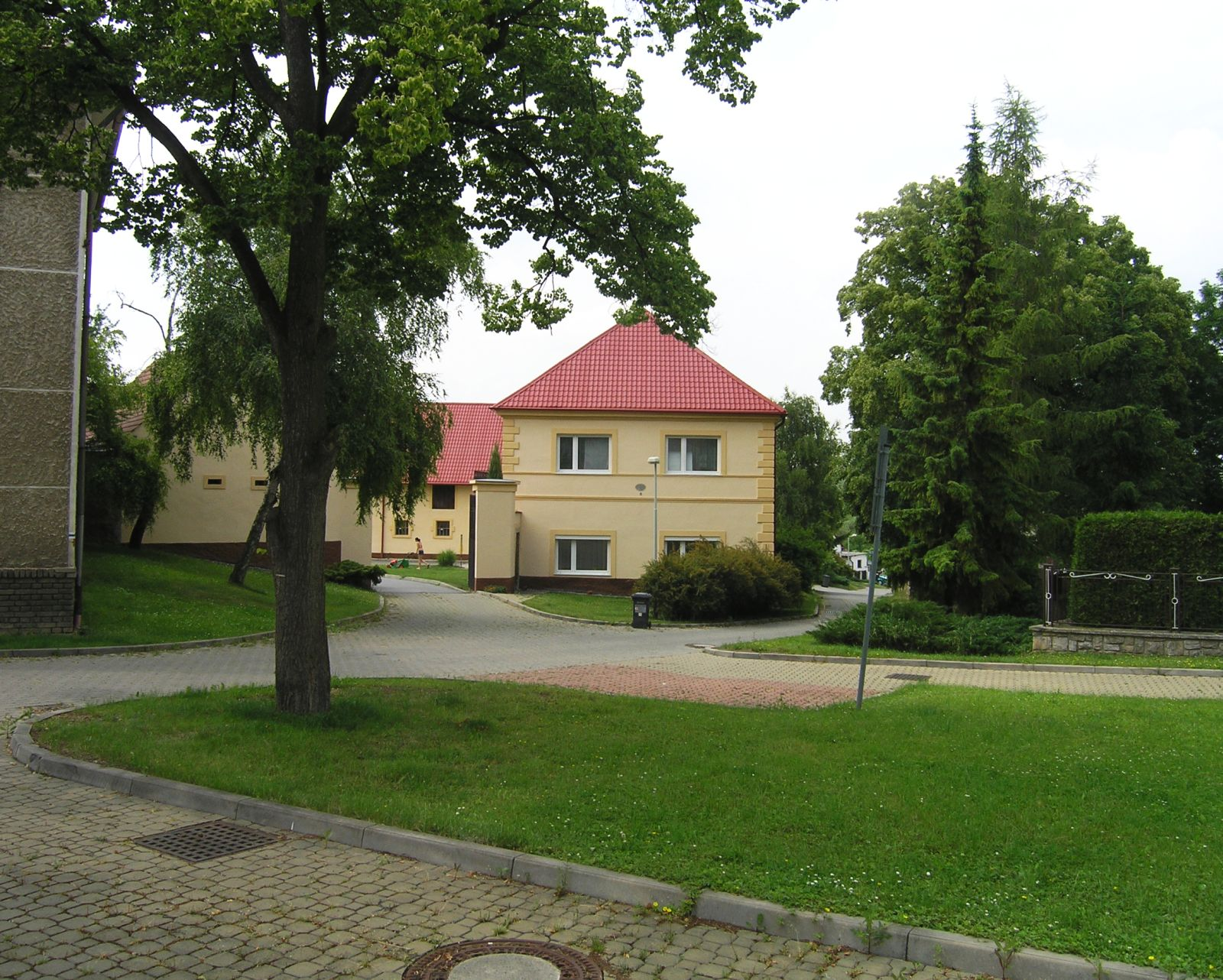
- Pod Lípou Square

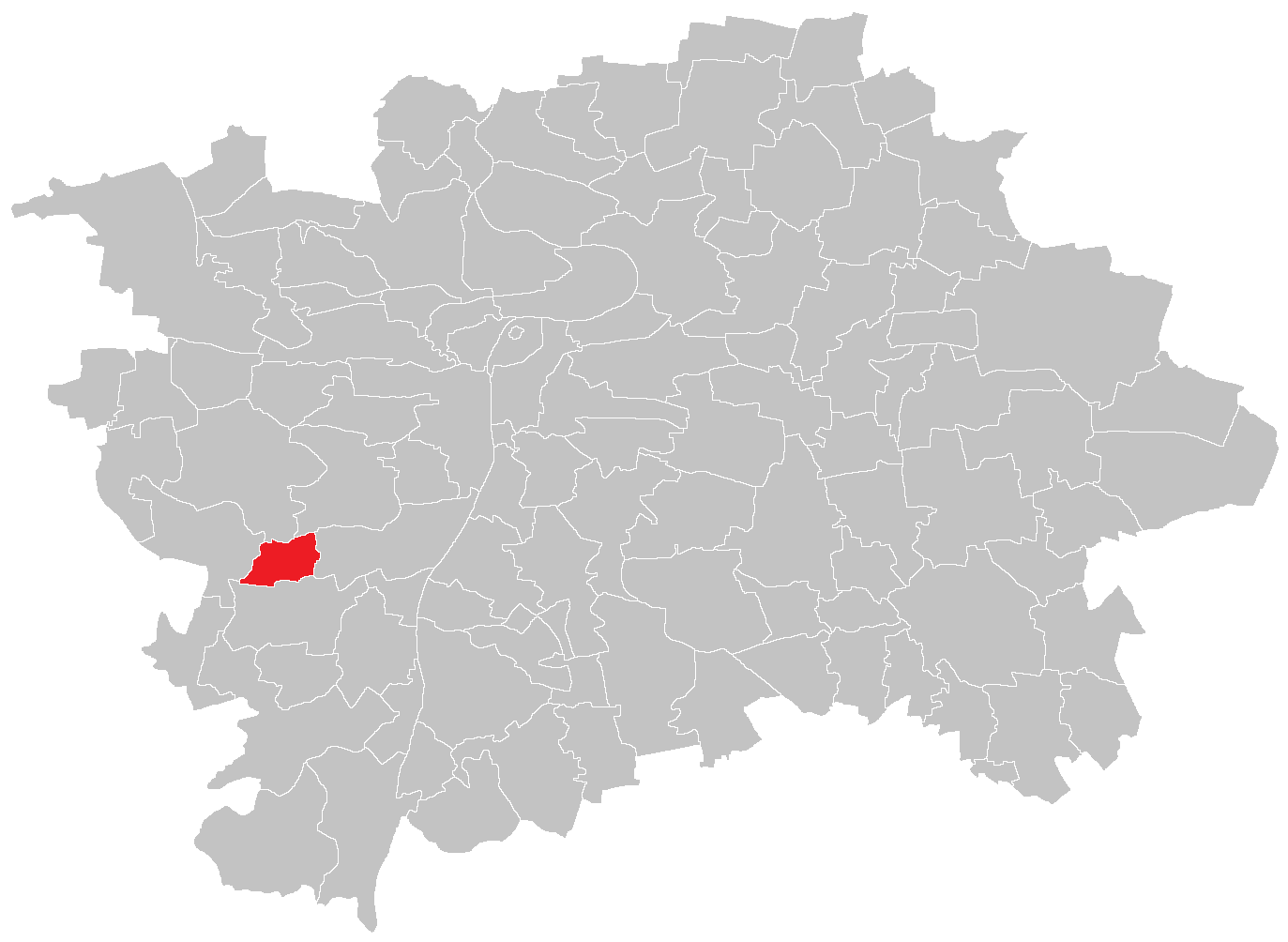
- Location of Holyně in Prague
- Coordinates: 50°1′43″N 14°21′16″E
- Country: Czech Republic
- Region: Prague
- District: Prague-Slivenec

Area
  - Total: 1.93 km^{2} (0.75 sq mi)

Population (2021)
  - Total: 463
  - Density: 240/km^{2} (621/sq mi)
- Time zone: UTC+1 (CET)
  - Summer (DST): UTC+2 (CEST)

Holyně is a village and cadastral area in Prague. It is located in the western part of the city. As of 2021, there were 463 inhabitants living in Holyně.

It is a part of municipal district (městská část) of Praha-Slivenec.

== Demographics ==
Historical population

Year	Pop.	±%
1869	221	—
1880	249	+12.7%
1890	268	+7.6%
1900	394	+47.0%
1910	435	+10.4%
1921	385	−11.5%
1930	395	+2.6%
1950	543	+37.5%

Year	Pop.	±%
1961	490	−9.8%
1970	438	−10.6%
1980	376	−14.2%
1991	328	−12.8%
2001	335	+2.1%
2011	451	+34.6%
2021	463	+2.7%

Source: Censuses

== Neighboring cadastral areas ==
- Řeporyje
- Stodůlky
- Jinonice
- Hlubočepy
- Slivenec

== Gallery ==
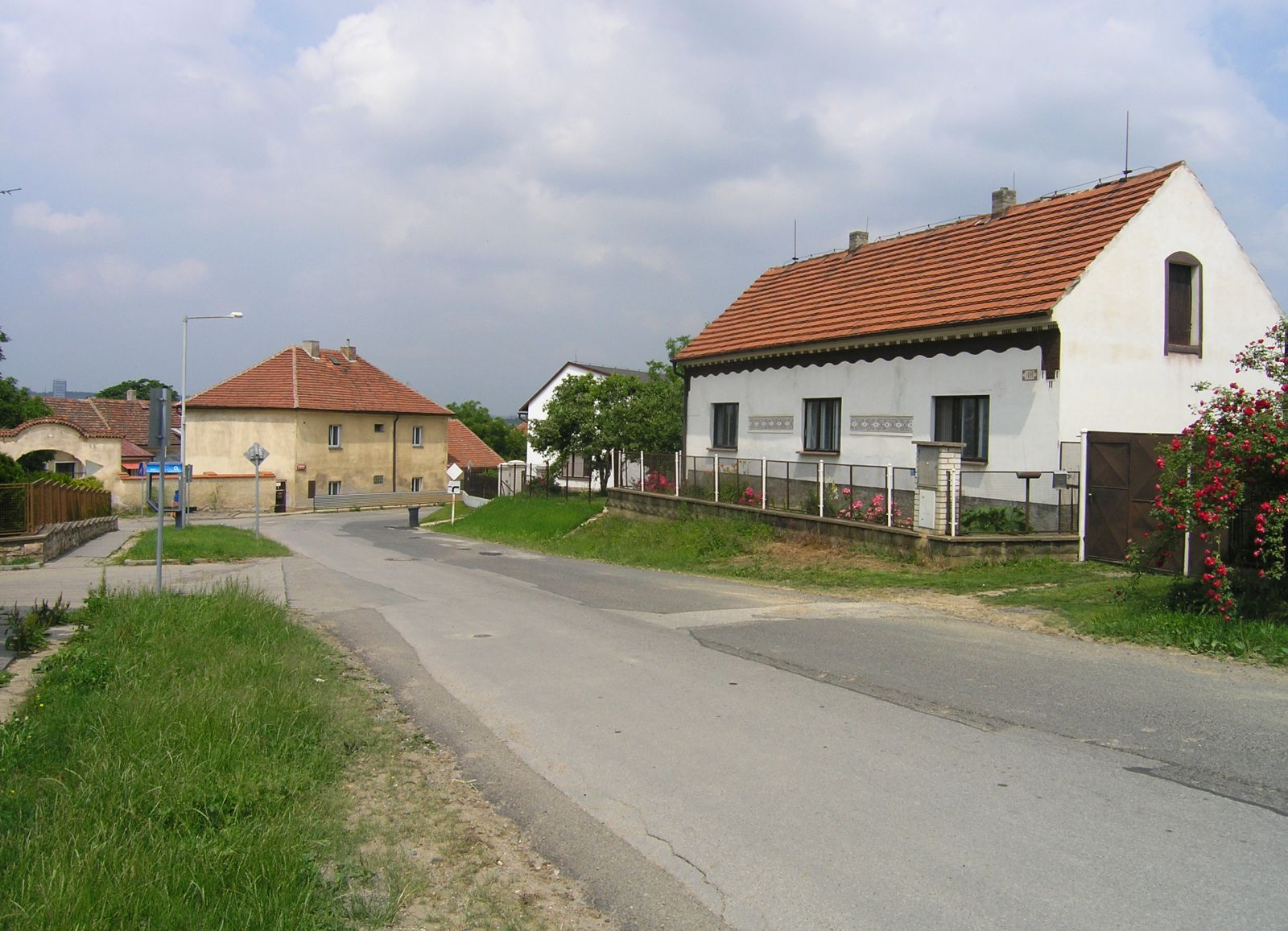
U Náhonu street

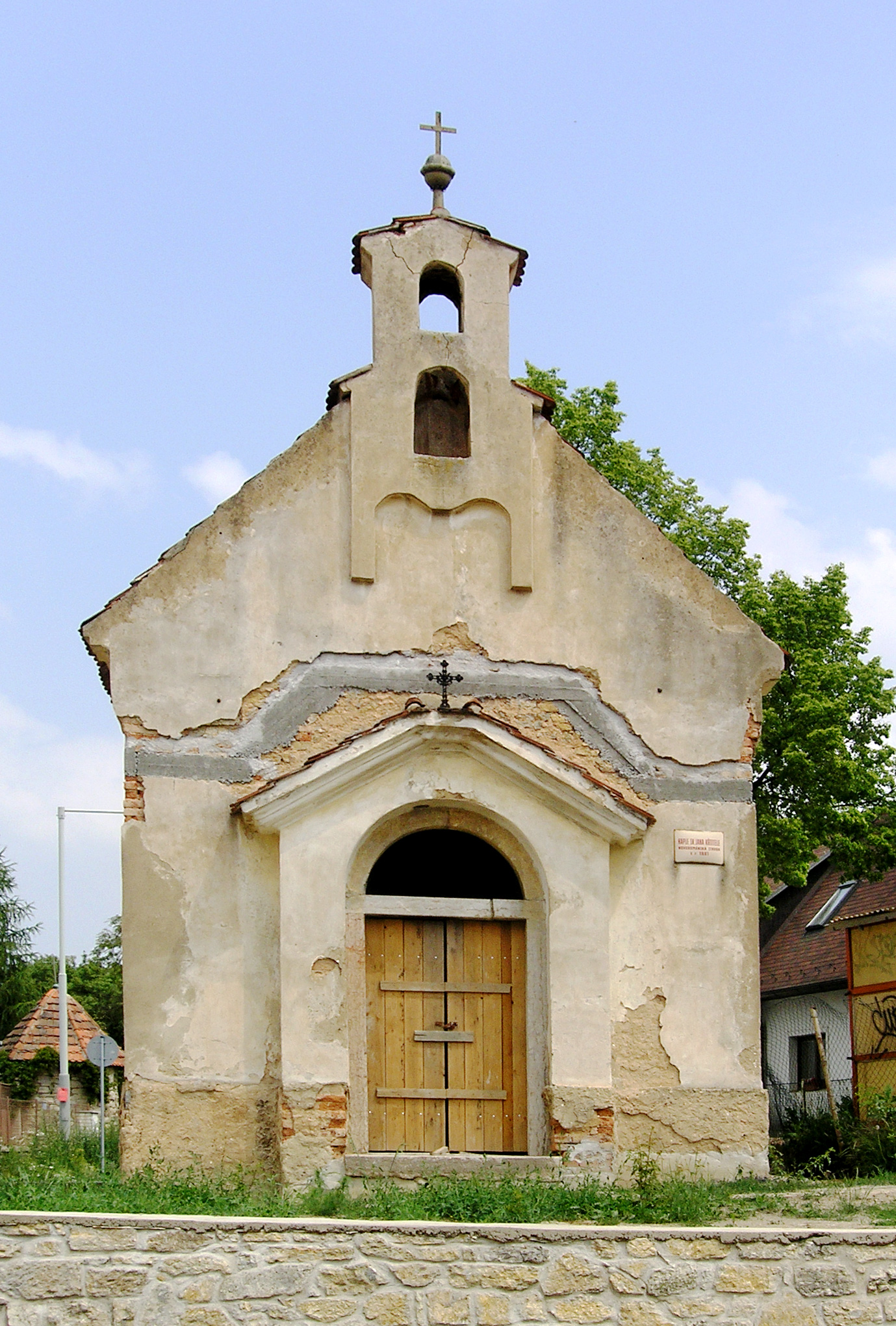
Chapel

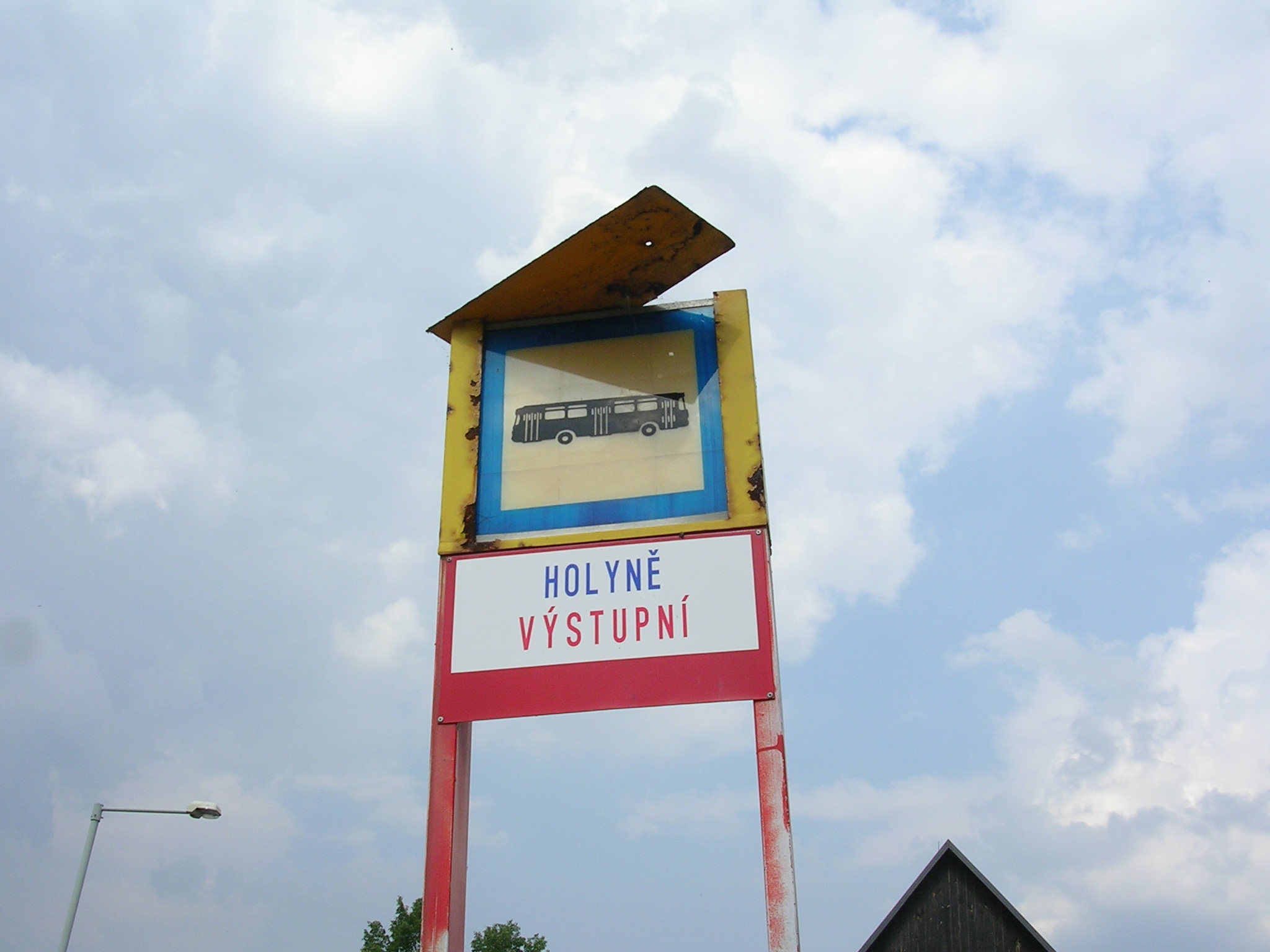
Bus stop
