= Luka (Prague Metro) =

Railway station in Prague, Czech Republic

Coordinates: 50°02′44″N 14°19′20″E

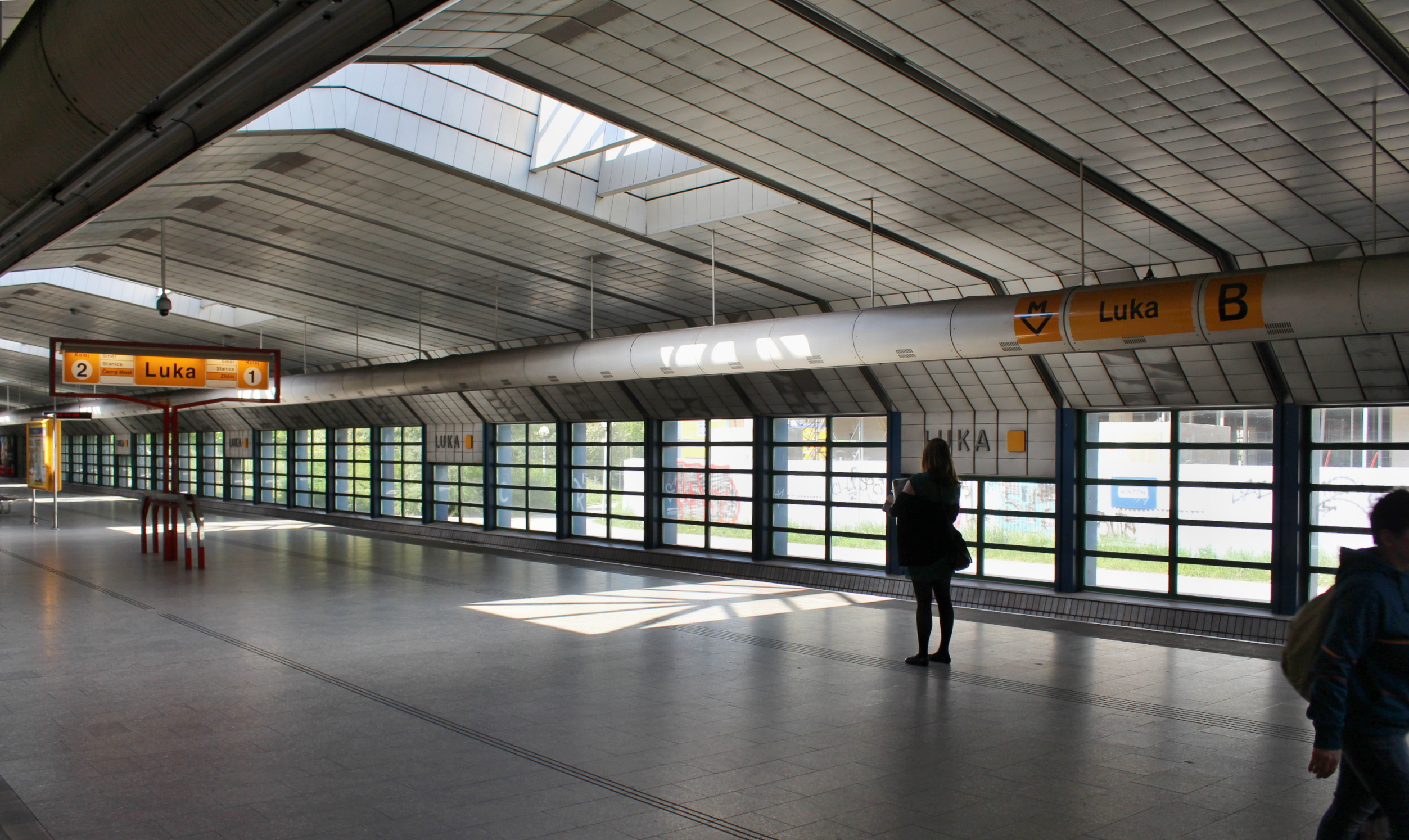

General information
- Location: Mukařovského street Stodůlky, Prague 13; Prague; Czech Republic
- System: Prague Metro
- Platforms: 1 island platform
- Tracks: 2

Construction
- Structure type: At grade
- Depth: 055 m (180 ft)
- Accessible: Yes

Other information
- Fare zone: PID: P

History
- Opened: 11 November 1994; 31 years ago

Services
Preceding station	Prague Metro	Following station
Stodůlky toward Zličín	Line B	Lužiny toward Černý Most
Location

Luka (Czech pronunciation: [ˈluka]) is a Prague Metro station on Line B. The station was opened on 11 November 1994 as part of the extension of Line B from Nové Butovice to Zličín. It is located on Mukařovského street in the suburb of Stodůlky.

Luka is a surface type station with an island platform and one staircase exit. The name, which literally means Meadows, is shared with the surrounding housing estate.

== Gallery ==
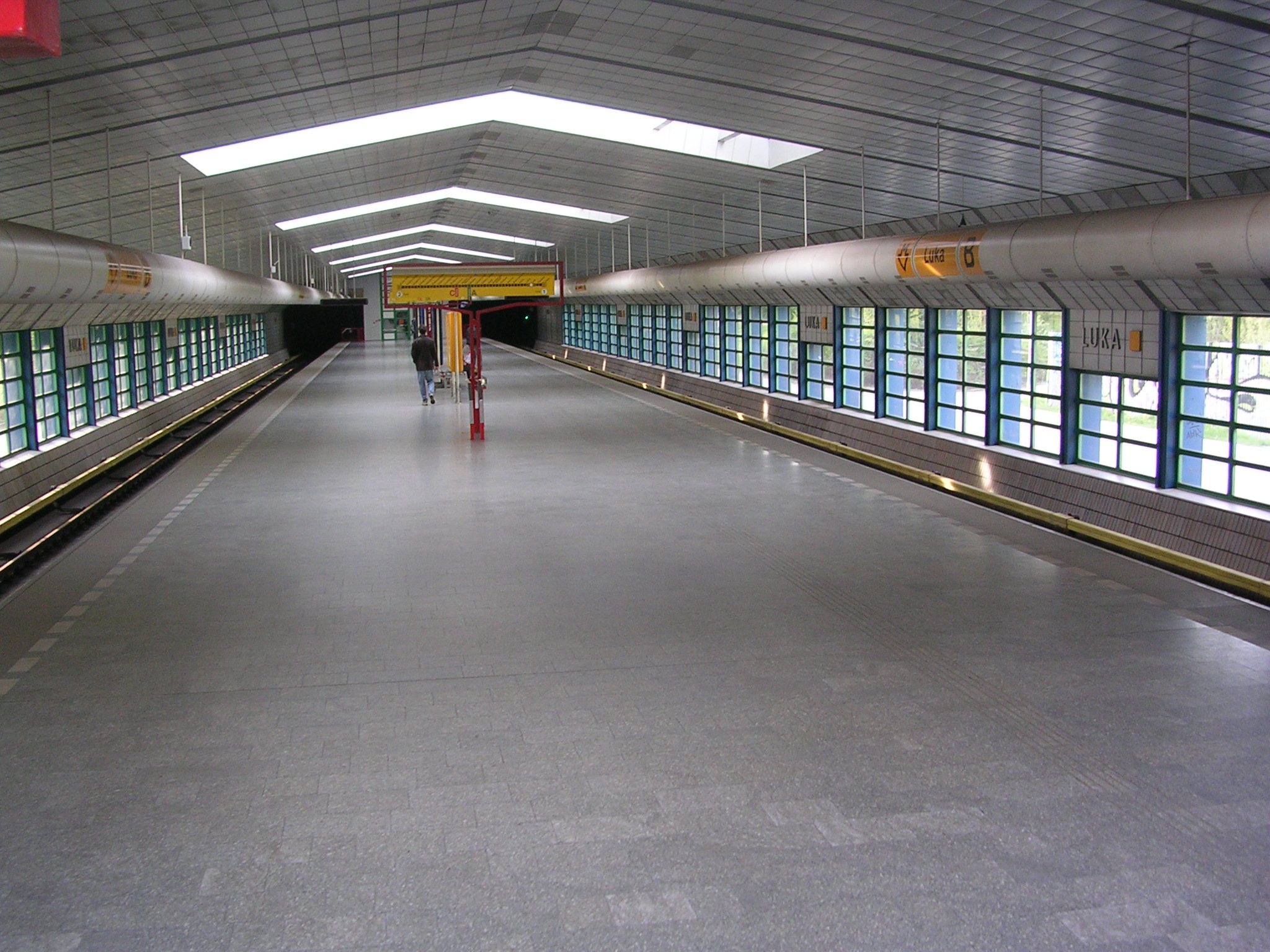
Platform of Luka station

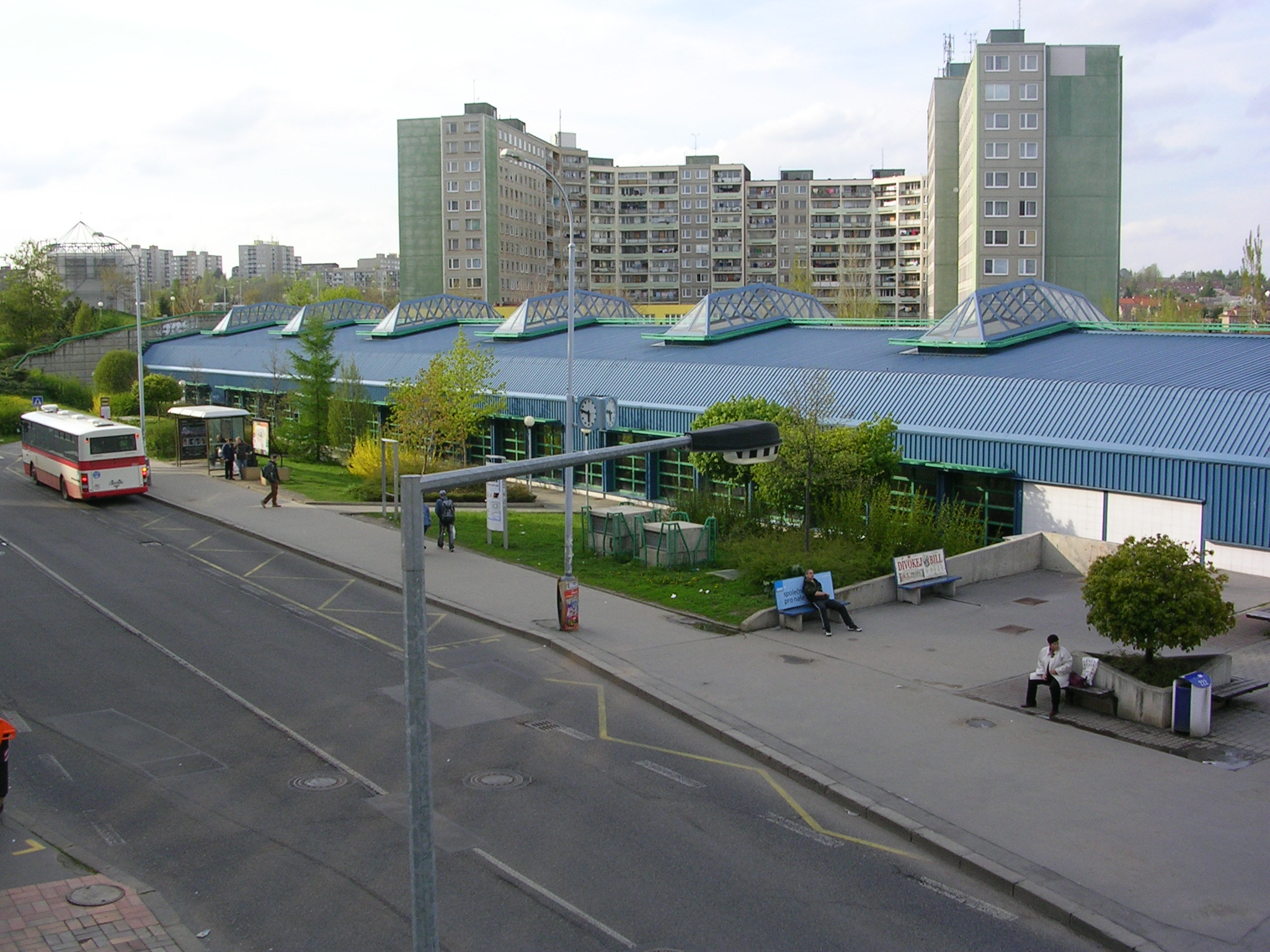
Exterior of Luka station with bus stop

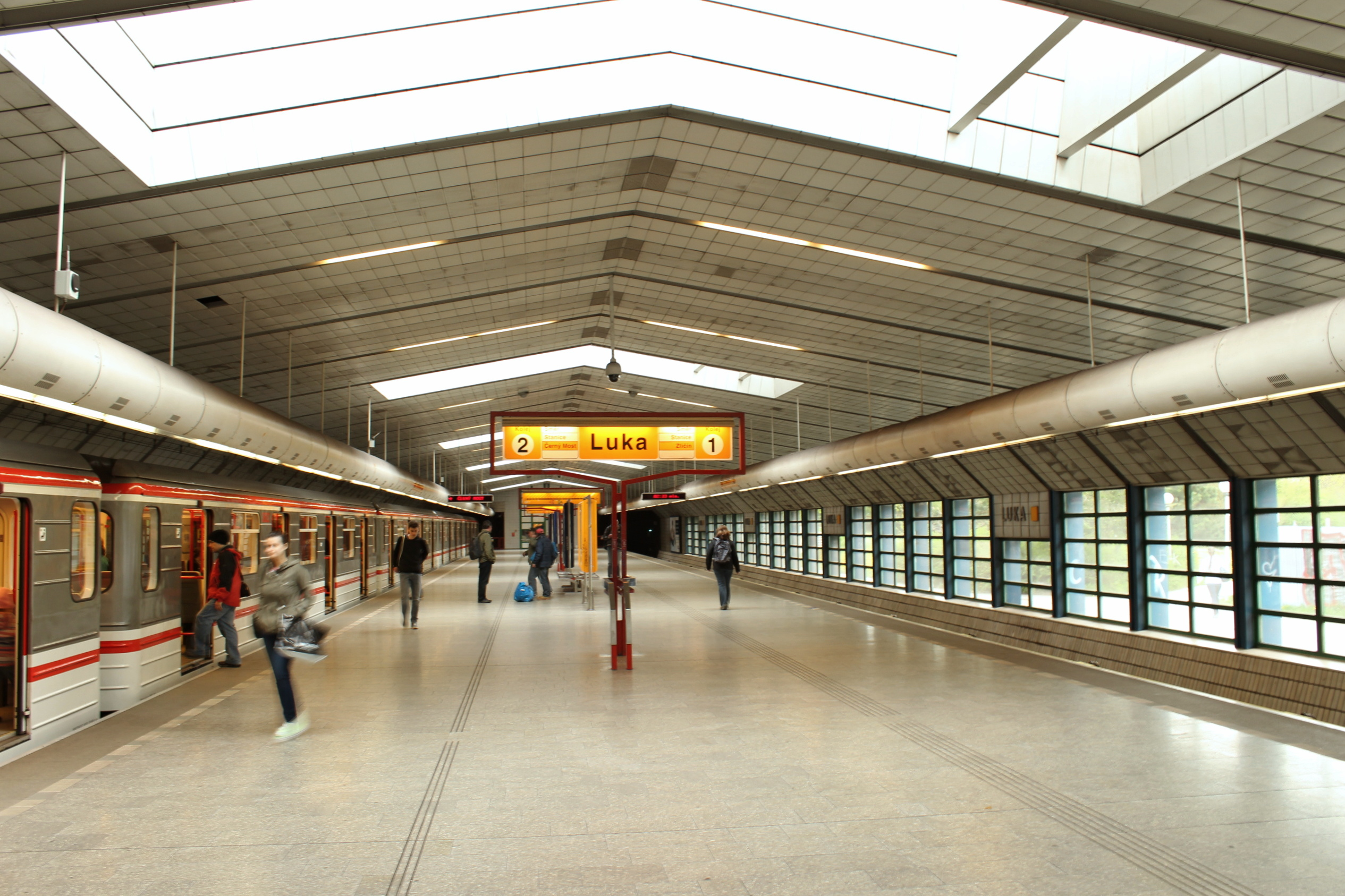
Station platform
