= Stodůlky (Prague Metro) =

Prague metro station

Coordinates: 50°02′49″N 14°18′25″E

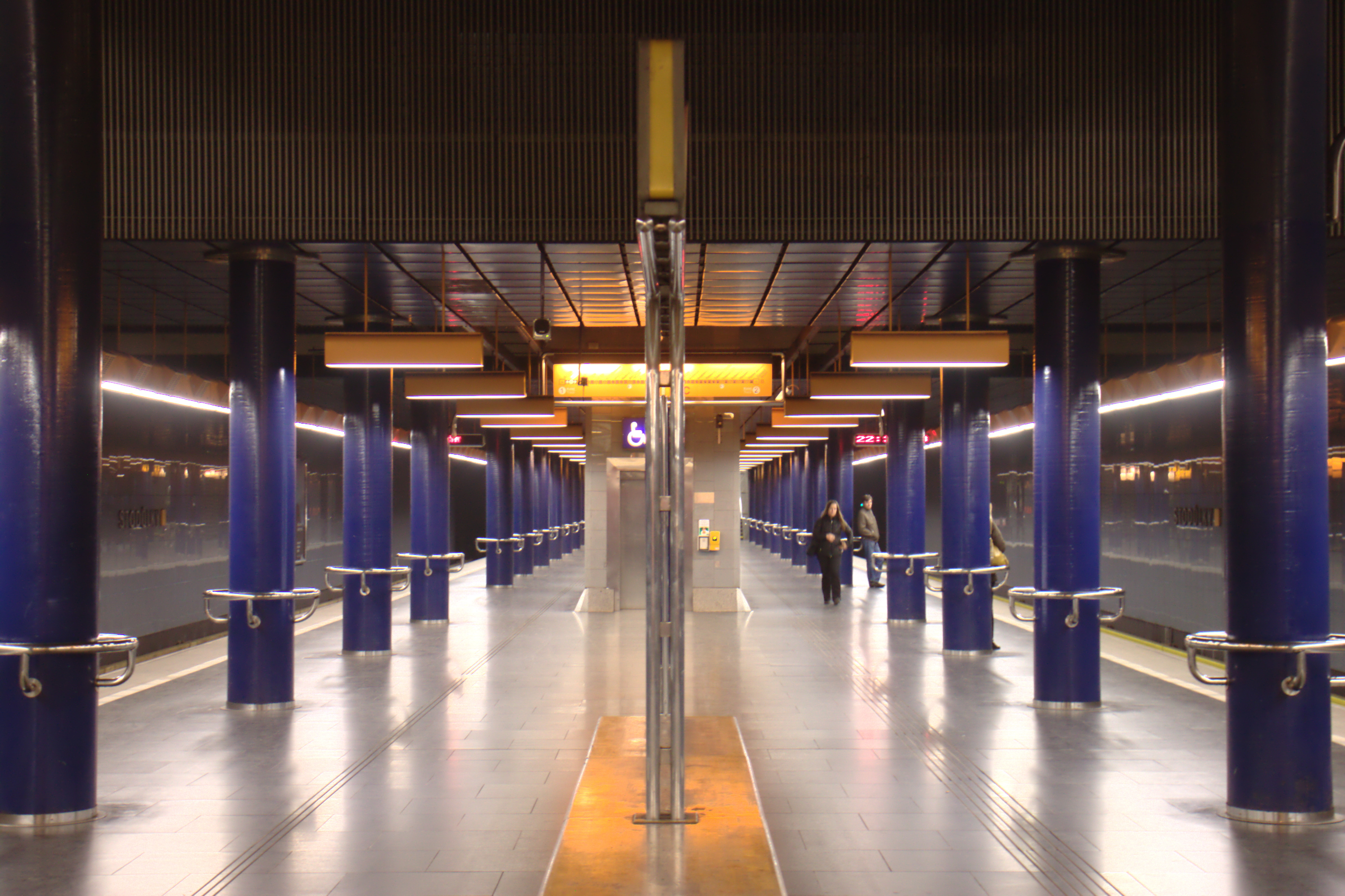

General information
- Location: Jeremiášova street Stodůlky, Prague 13; Prague; Czech Republic
- System: Prague Metro
- Platforms: 1 island platform
- Tracks: 2

Construction
- Structure type: Underground
- Depth: 131 m (430 ft)
- Accessible: Yes

Other information
- Fare zone: PID: P

History
- Opened: 11 November 1994; 31 years ago

Services
| Preceding station | Prague Metro | Following station |
|---|---|---|
| Zličín Terminus | Line B | Luka toward Černý Most |
Location

Stodůlky (Czech pronunciation: [ˈstoduːlkɪ]) is a Prague Metro station on Line B, located in Stodůlky, Prague 13. The station was opened on 11 November 1994 as part of the extension of Line B from Nové Butovice to Zličín.

== Photogallery ==
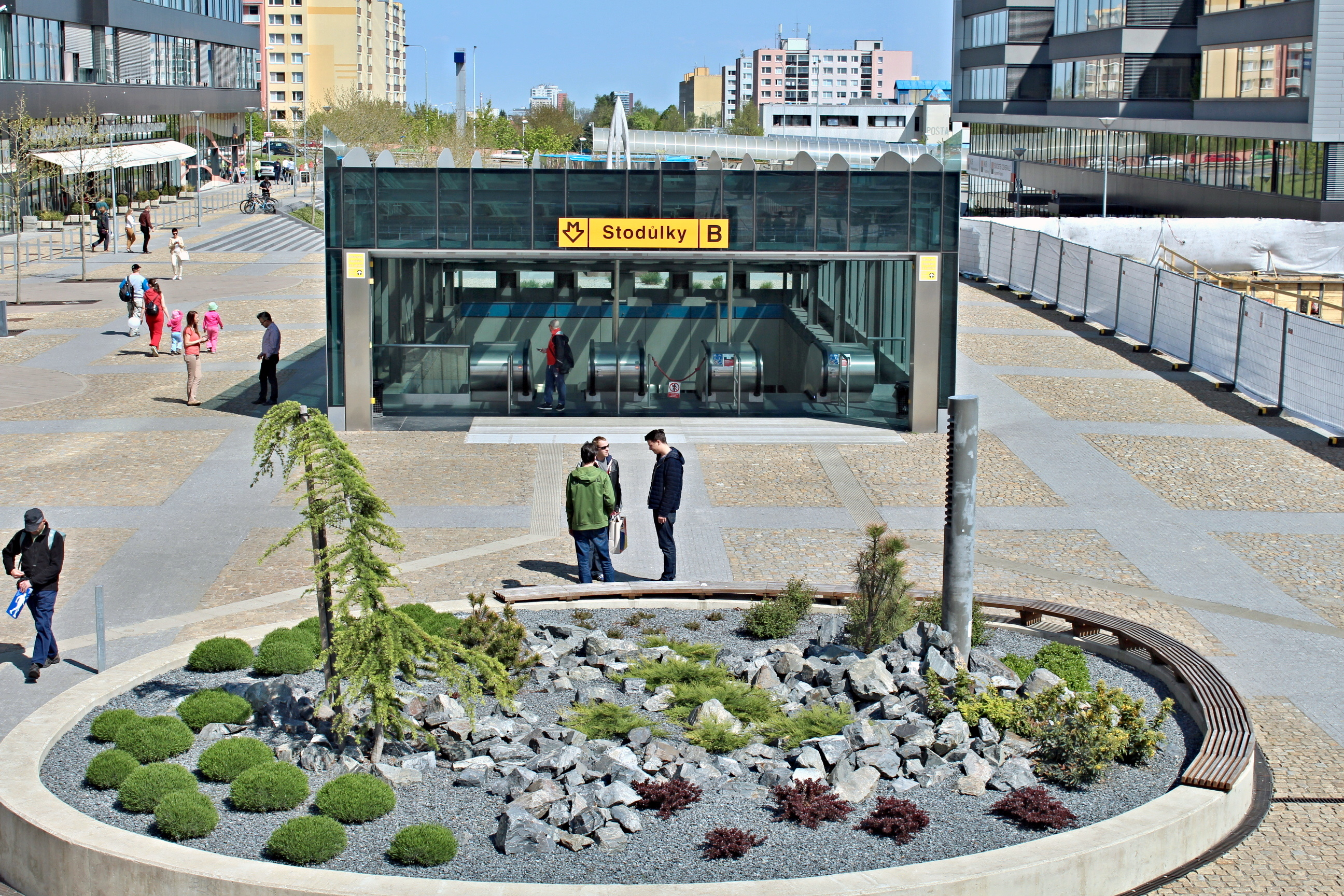
Entrance to the station

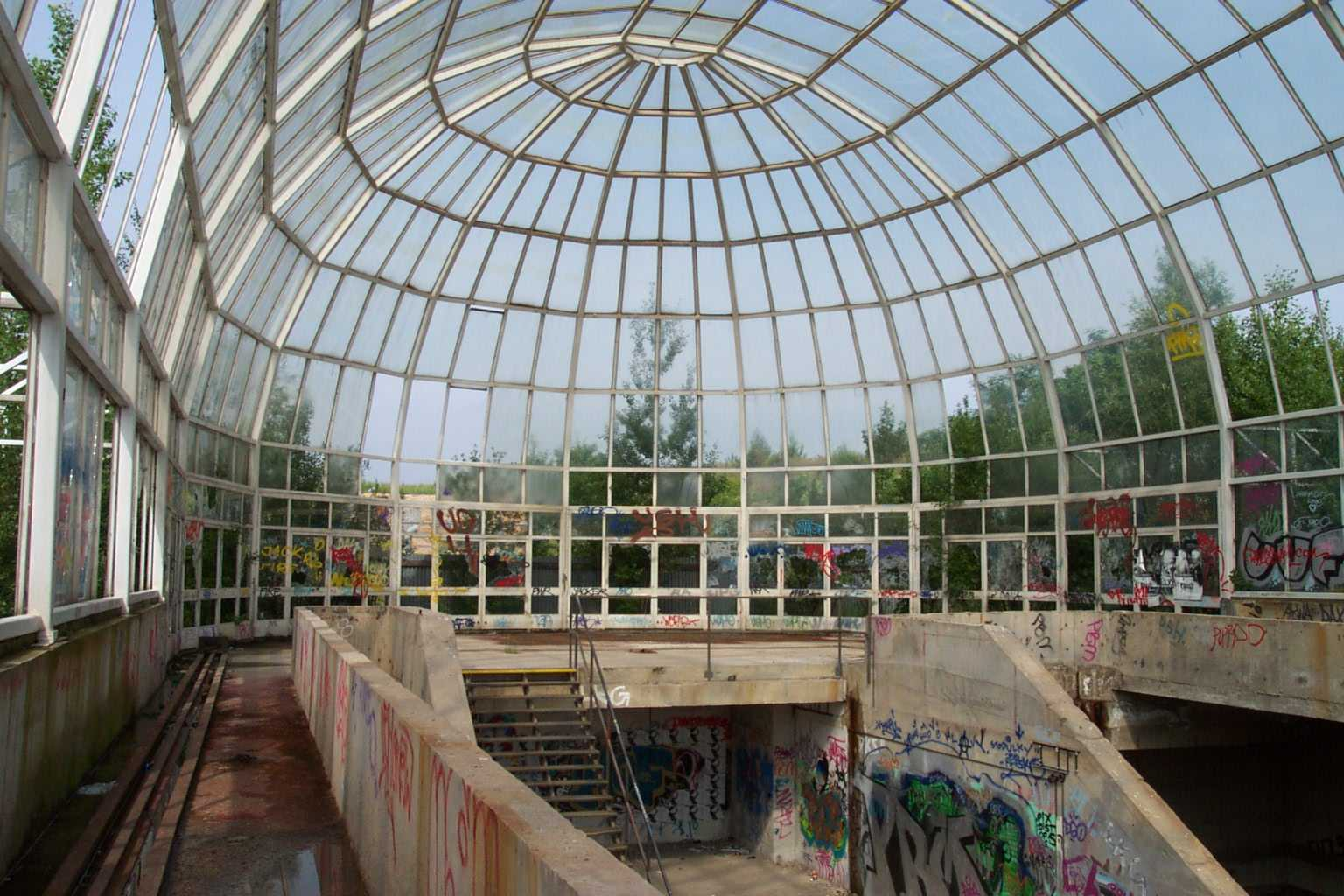
Unfinished west vestibule

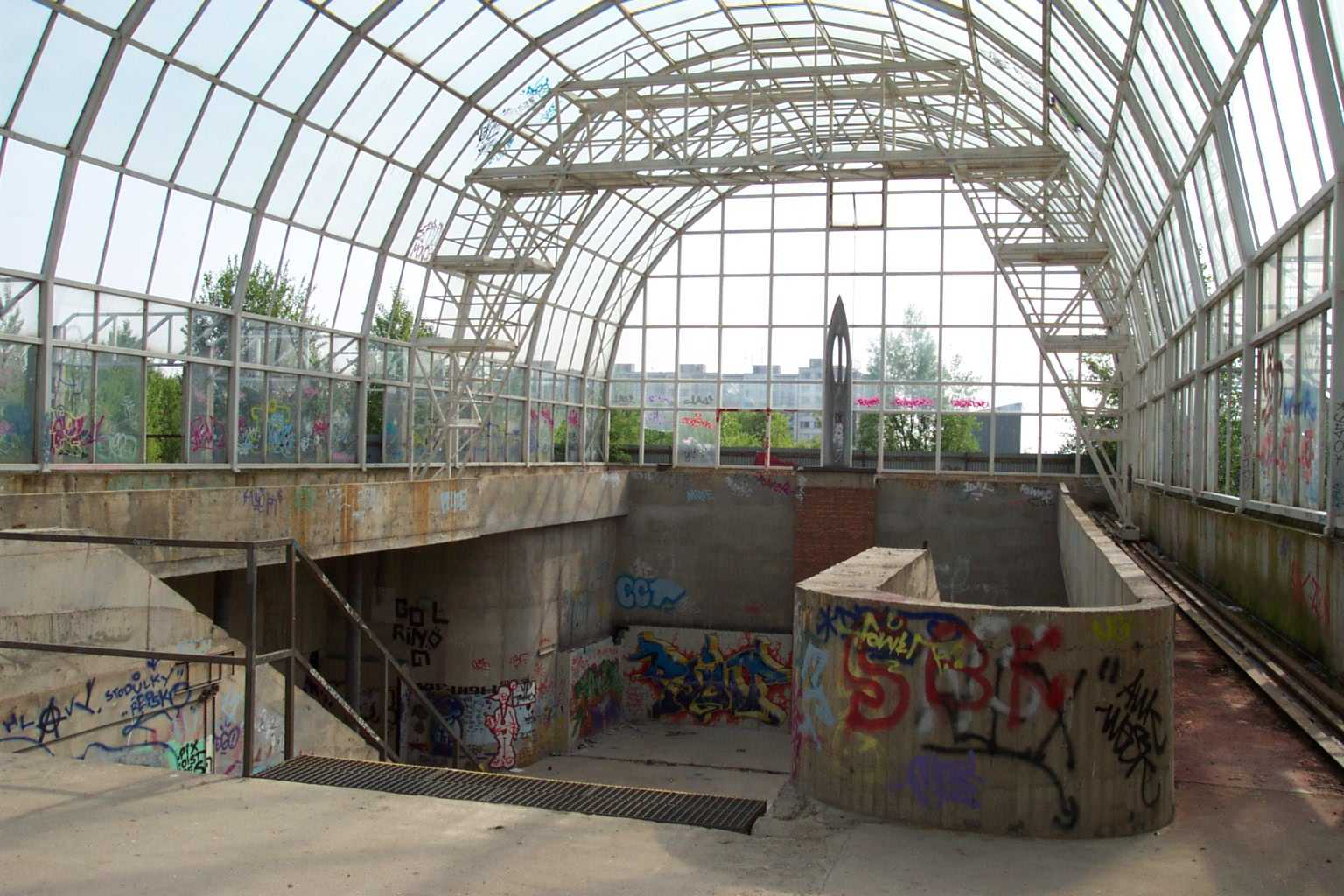
Unfinished west vestibule

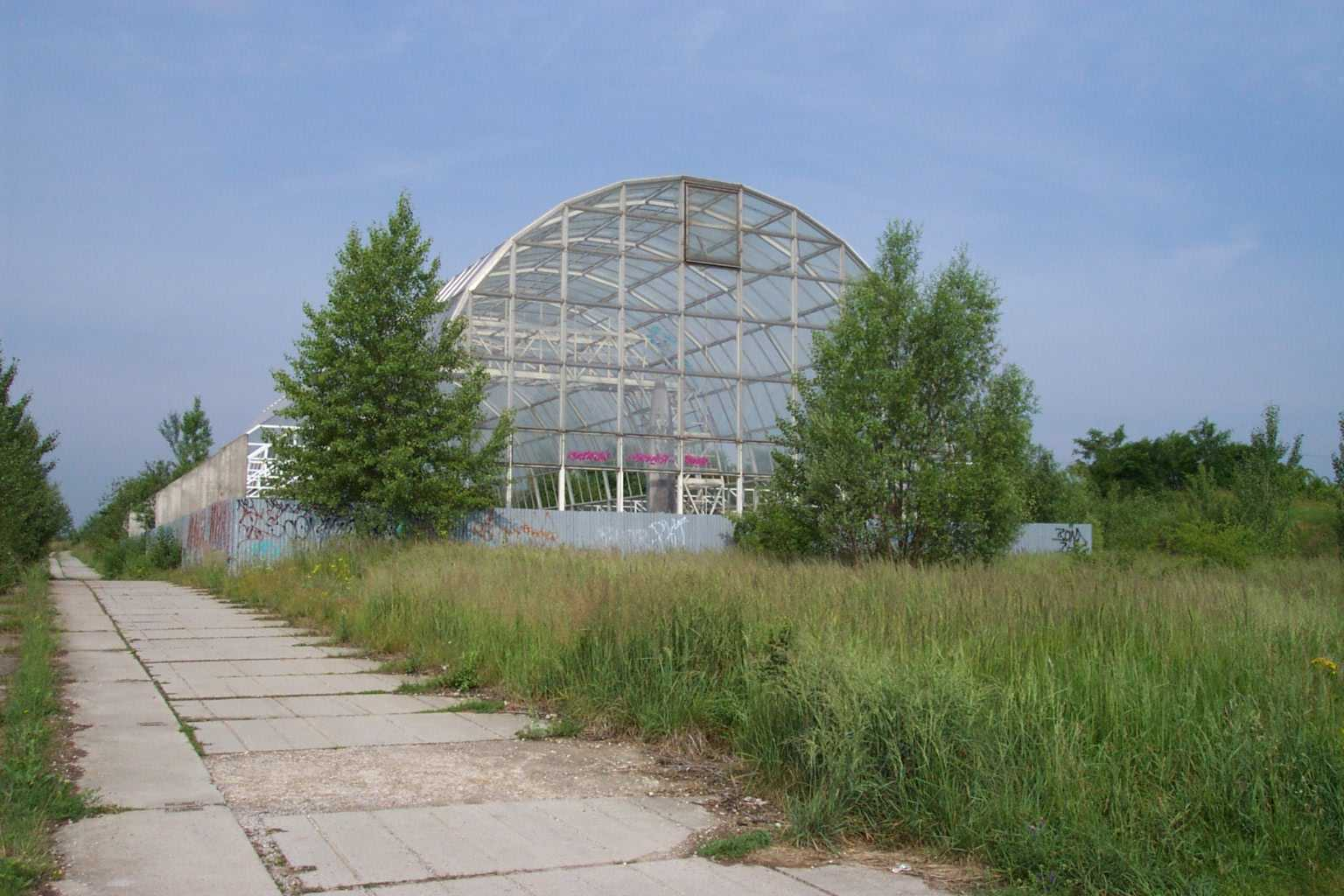
Unfinished west vestibule

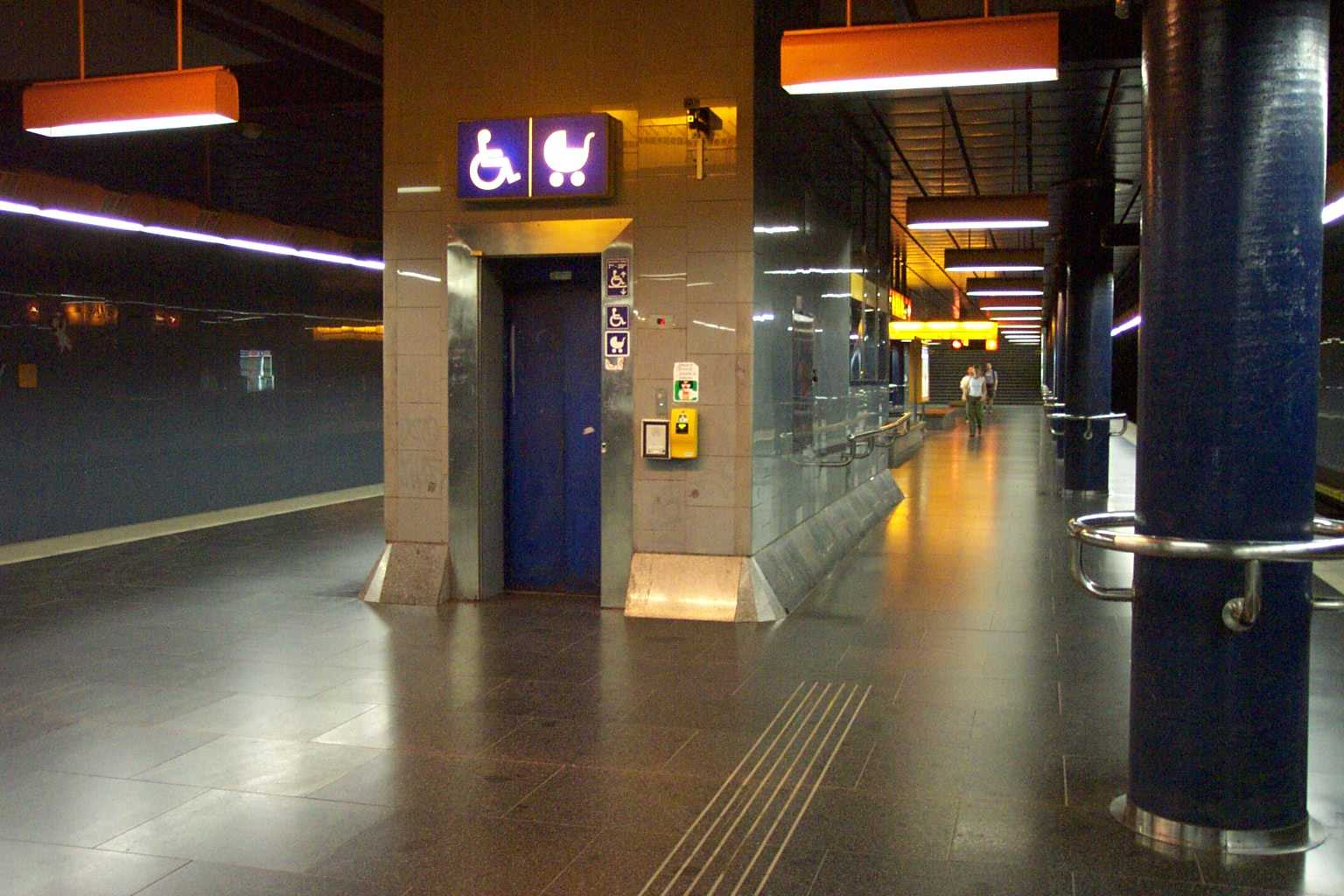
Elevator

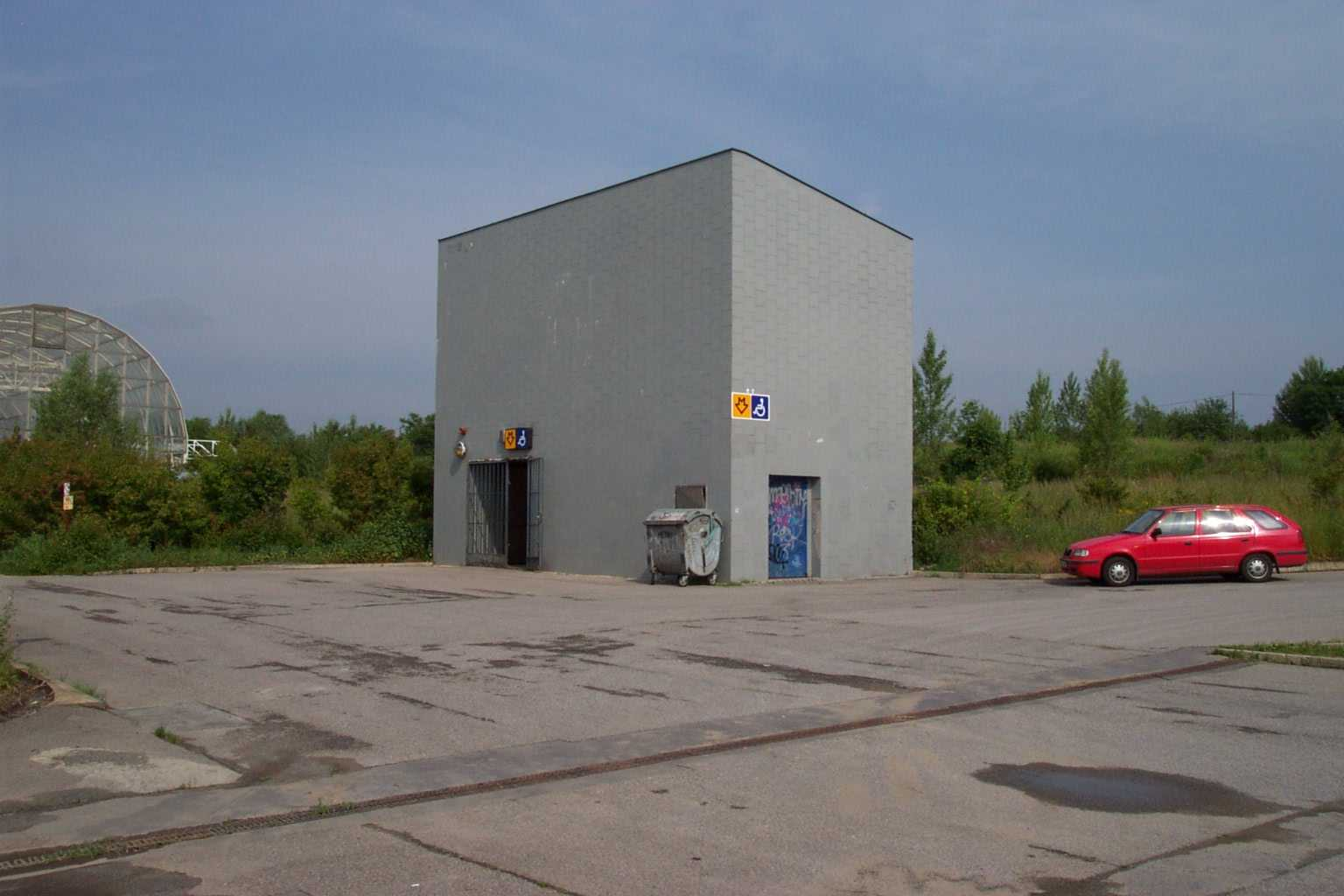
Elevator

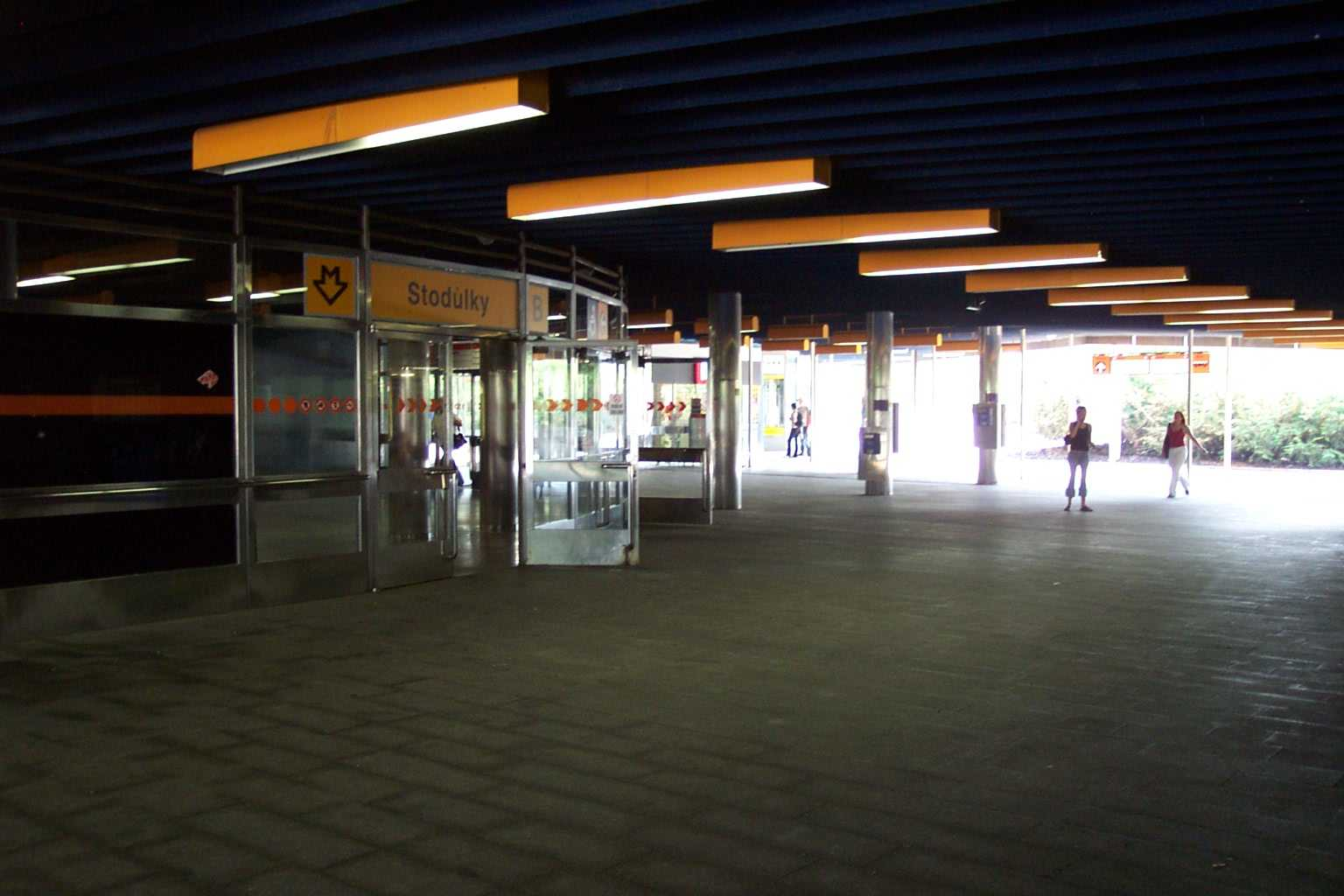
East exit and vestibule

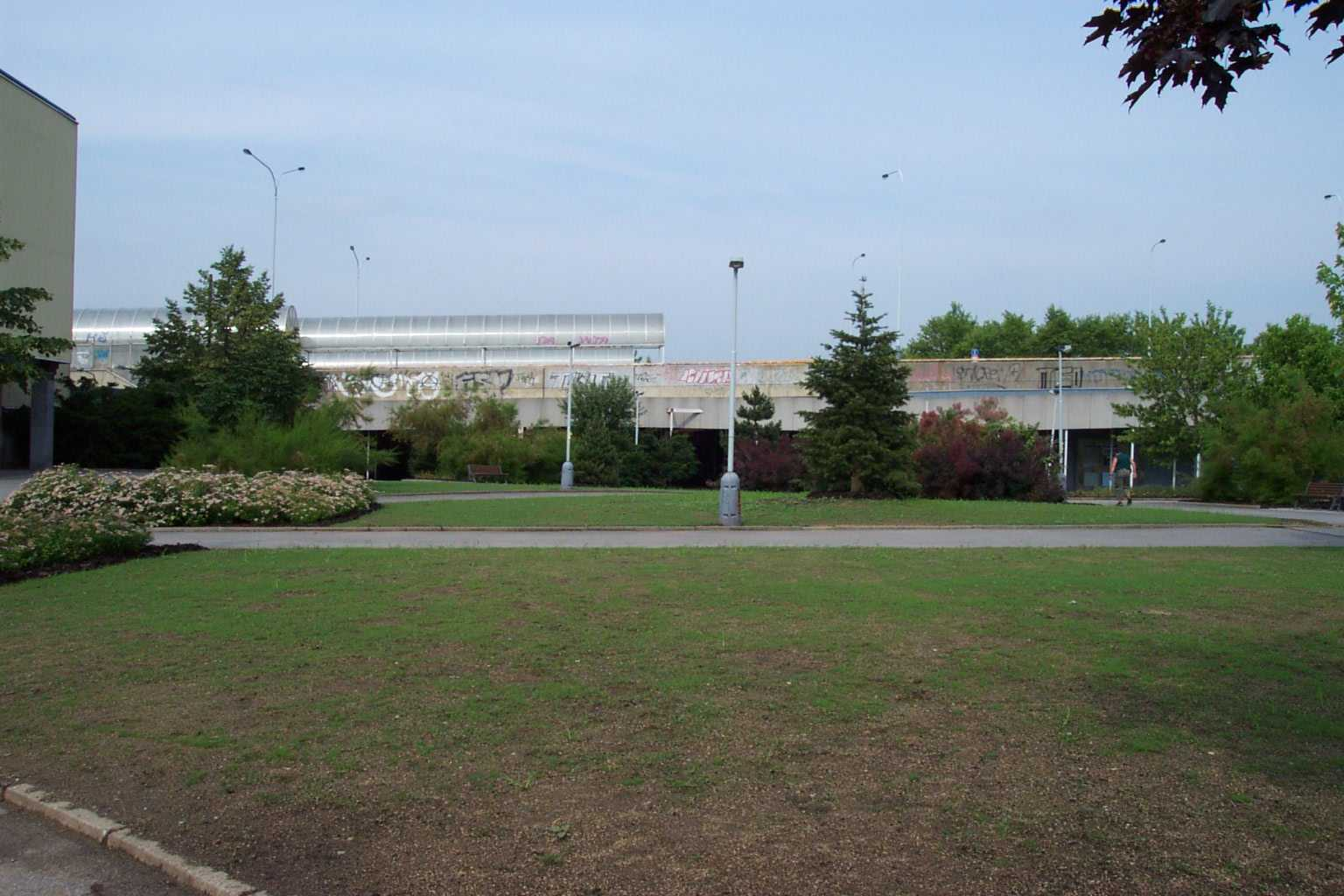
East exit and vestibule

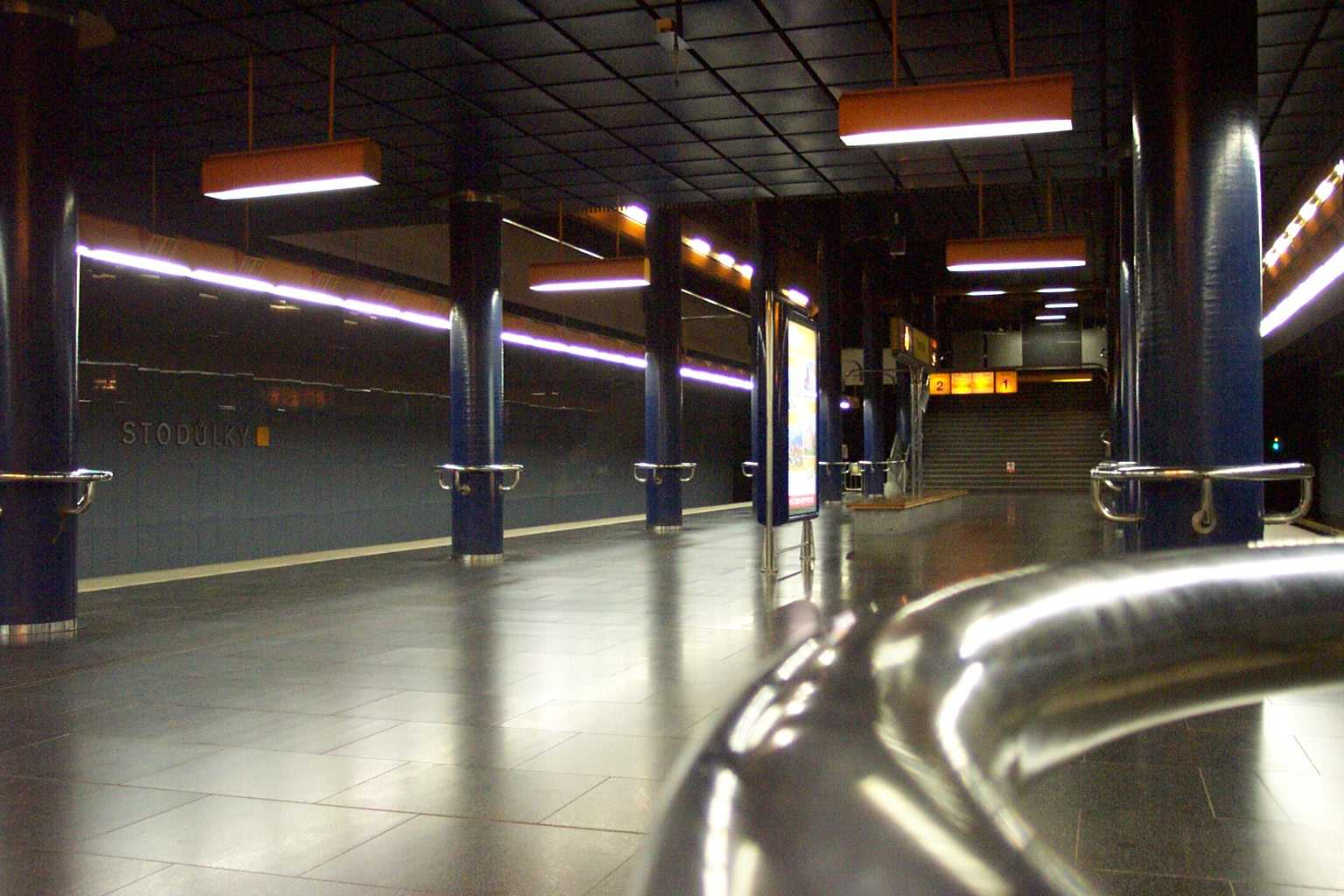
Platform
