= Lužiny (Prague Metro) =

Prague metro station

Coordinates: 50.045°N 14.330°E

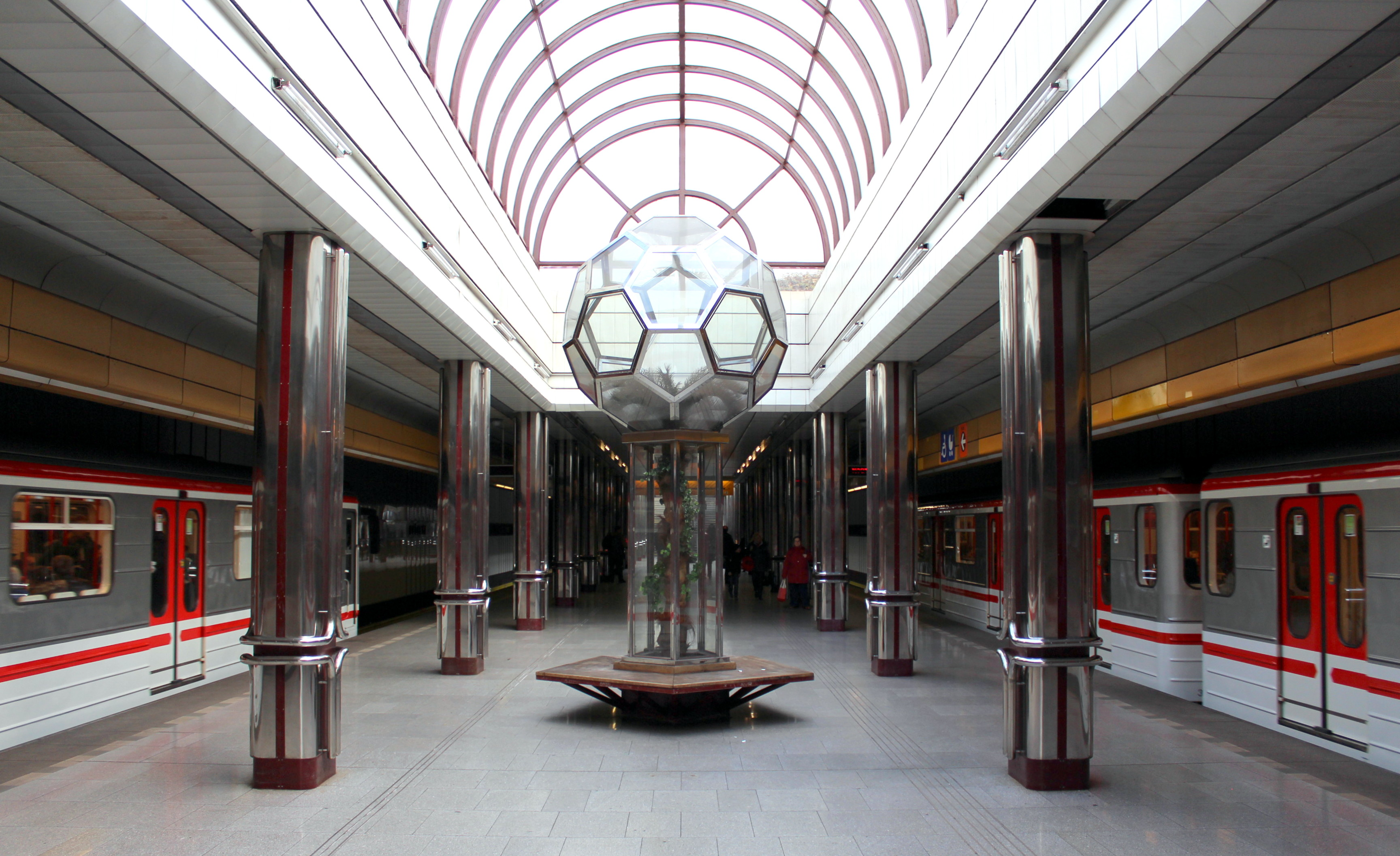

General information
- Location: Archeologická street Stodůlky, Prague 13; Prague; Czech Republic
- System: Prague Metro
- Platforms: 1 island platform
- Tracks: 2

Construction
- Structure type: Below grade
- Depth: 7 m (23 ft)
- Accessible: Yes

Other information
- Fare zone: PID: Prague

History
- Opened: 11 November 1994; 31 years ago

Services
Preceding station	Prague Metro	Following station
Luka toward Zličín	Line B	Hůrka toward Černý Most
Location

Lužiny (Czech pronunciation: [ˈluʒɪnɪ]) is a Prague Metro station on Line B, located in Stodůlky, Prague 13. The station was opened on 11 November 1994 as part of the extension of Line B from Nové Butovice to Zličín.

== Gallery ==
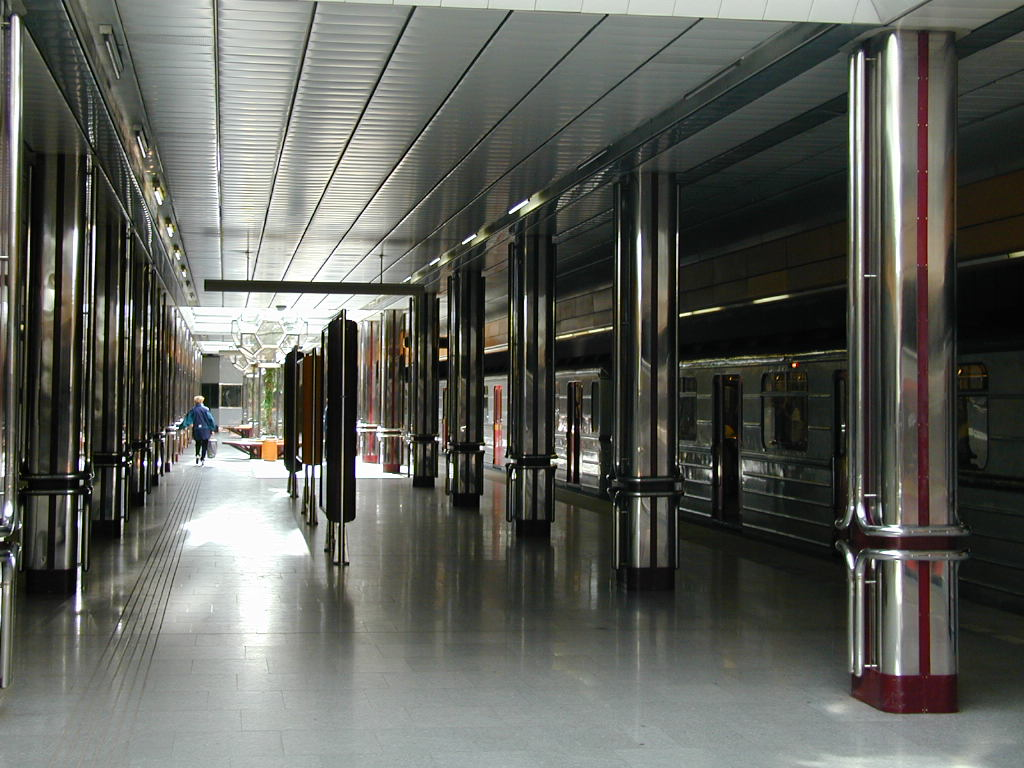
Lužiny metro station

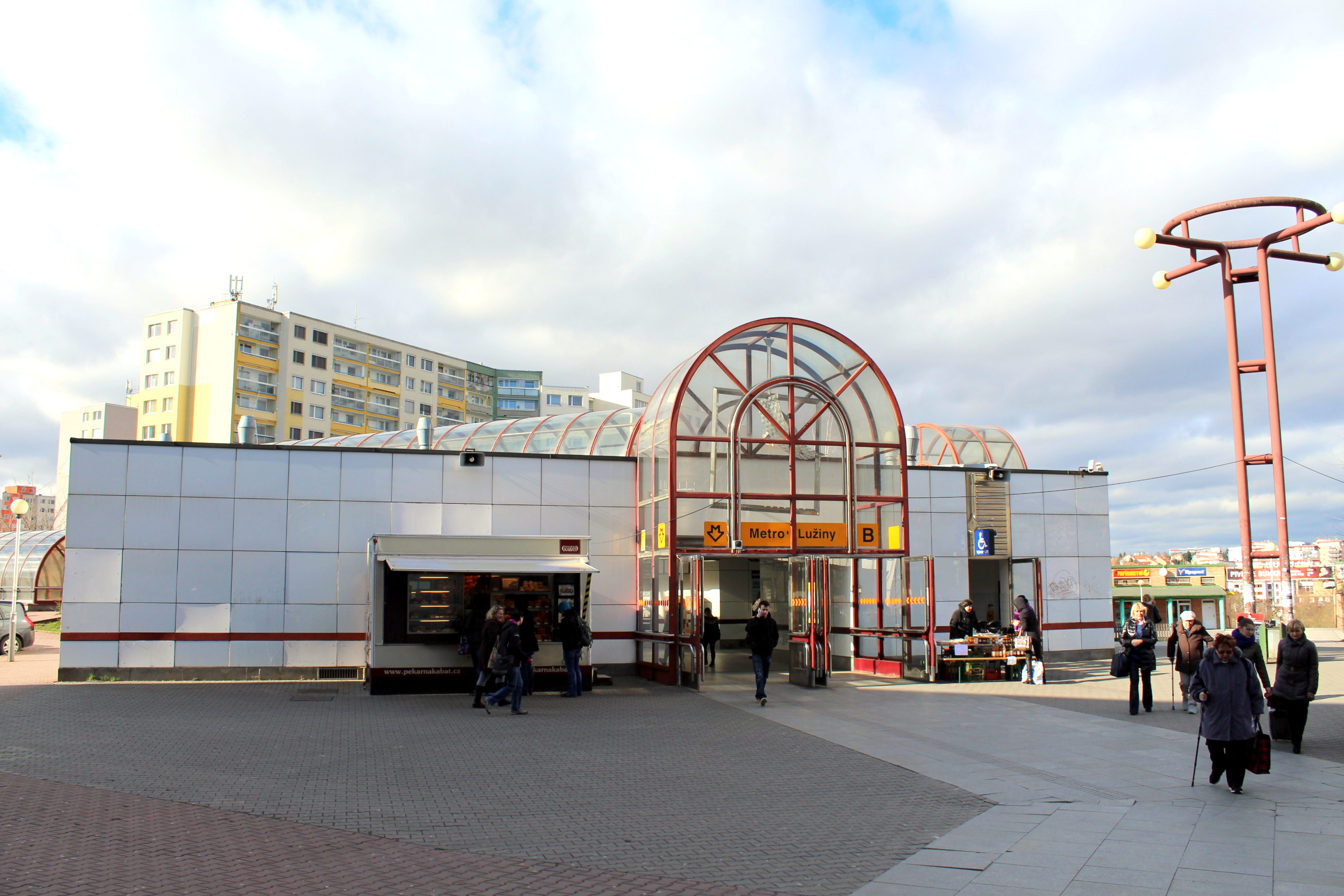
Entrance to the station
