= Slivenec =

- Municipal District of Prague
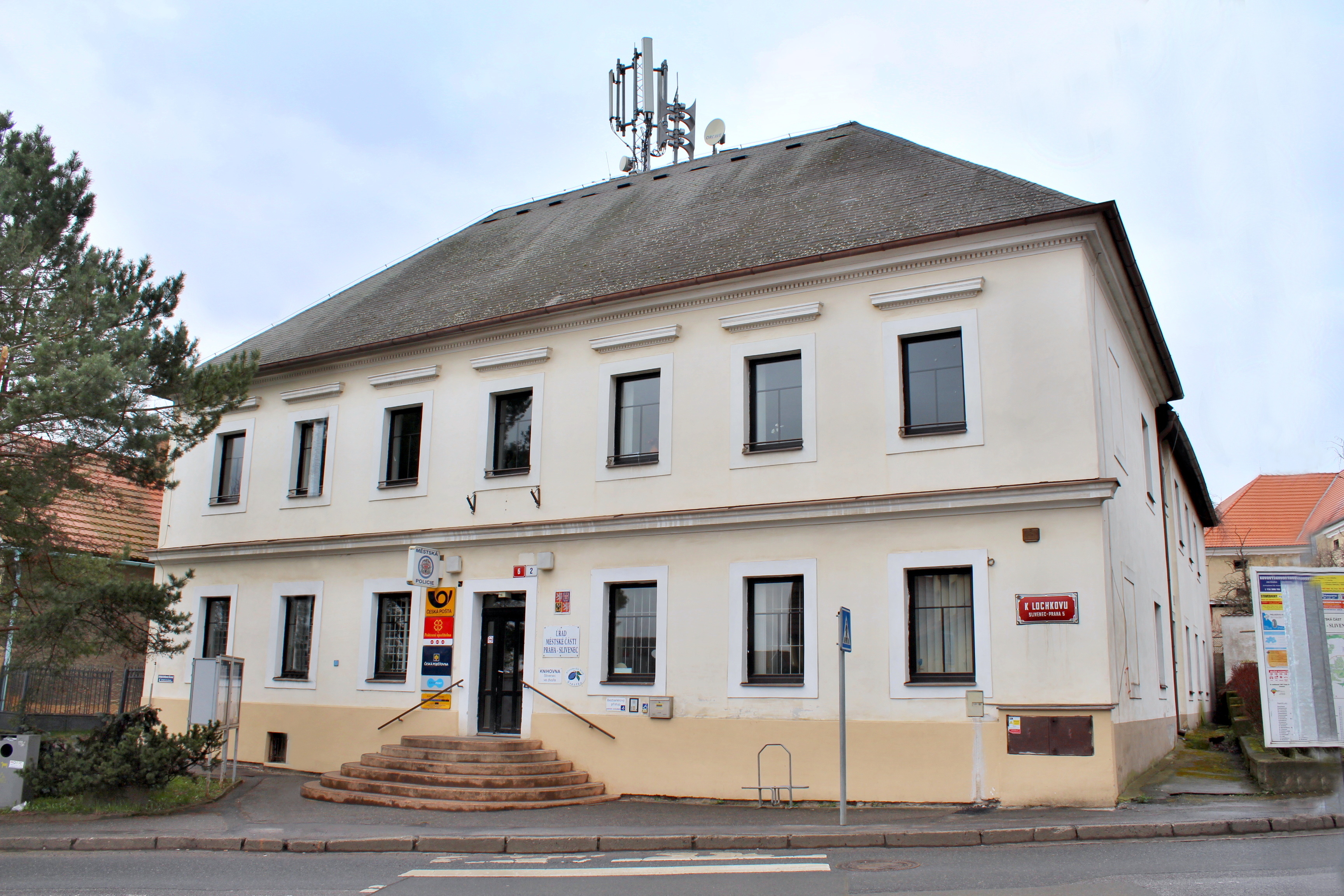
- Municipal office

- Flag Coat of arms
- Interactive map of Slivenec
- Coordinates: 50°1′3″N 14°21′25″E
- Country: Czech Republic
- Region: Prague
- District: Prague 5

Area
  - Total: 5.66 km^{2} (2.19 sq mi)

Population (2021)
  - Total: 3,999
  - Density: 707/km^{2} (1,830/sq mi)
- Time zone: UTC+1 (CET)
  - Summer (DST): UTC+2 (CEST)
- Website: https://www.praha-slivenec.cz/

Slivenec is a municipal district (městská část) in Prague, Czech Republic.

== Demographics ==
Historical population
Year	Pop.	±%
1869	771	—
1880	889	+15.3%
1890	1,098	+23.5%
1900	1,280	+16.6%
1910	1,283	+0.2%
1921	1,222	−4.8%
1930	1,729	+41.5%
1950	2,301	+33.1%
1961	2,294	−0.3%
1970	2,248	−2.0%
1980	2,216	−1.4%
1991	1,870	−15.6%
2001	1,994	+6.6%
2011	3,106	+55.8%
2021	3,999	+28.8%
Source: Censuses
