= Prague 13 =

Prague 13 Praha 13
- Municipal District of Prague; Administrative District of Prague
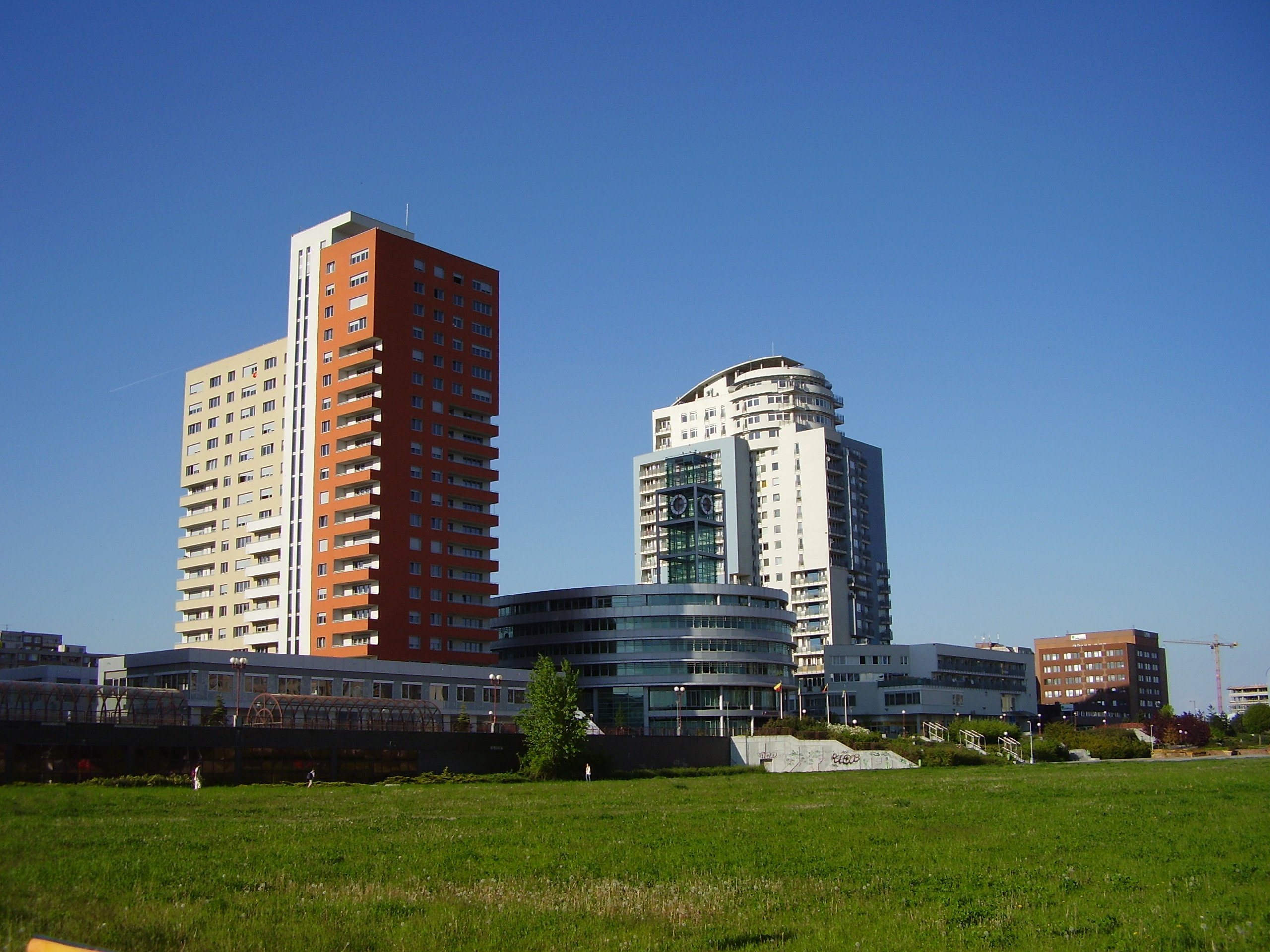
- High-rise buildings in Prague 13

- Flag Coat of arms

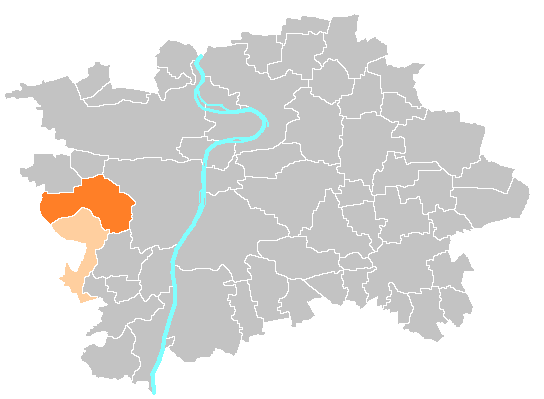
- Location of Prague 13 in Prague
- Coordinates: 50°3′0″N 14°20′40″E
- Country: Czech Republic
- Region: Prague

Government
  - Mayor: David Vodrážka

Area
  - Total: 13.23 km^{2} (5.11 sq mi)

Population (2021)
  - Total: 60,189
  - Density: 4,549/km^{2} (11,780/sq mi)
- Time zone: UTC+1 (CET)
  - Summer (DST): UTC+2 (CEST)
- Postal code: 155 00, 158 00
- Website: http://www.praha13.cz

Prague 13 is a municipal district (městská část) in Prague, Czech Republic.

The administrative district (správní obvod) of the same name consists of municipal districts Prague 13 and Řeporyje.

== Demographics ==
Historical population
Year	Pop.	±%
1869	1,093	—
1880	1,185	+8.4%
1890	1,416	+19.5%
1900	1,591	+12.4%
1910	1,741	+9.4%
1921	1,707	−2.0%
1930	3,245	+90.1%
1950	3,697	+13.9%
1961	3,580	−3.2%
1970	3,935	+9.9%
1980	3,920	−0.4%
1991	35,917	+816.2%
2001	52,457	+46.1%
2011	59,906	+14.2%
2021	60,189	+0.5%
Source: Censuses

== See also ==
- Districts of Prague § Symbols
