= Pražského povstání (Prague Metro) =

Prague metro station

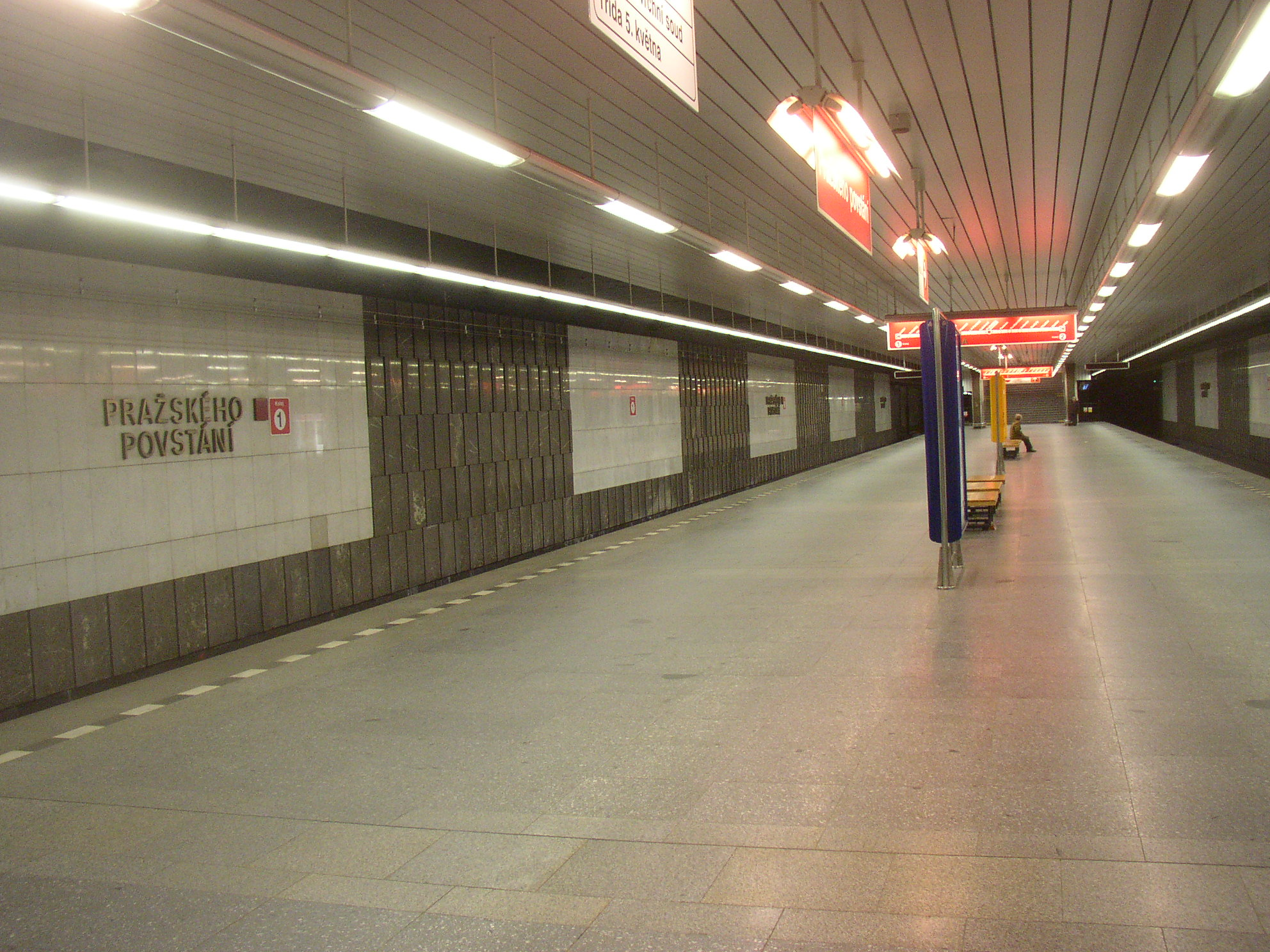
- Platform of the station, exit staircase at the opposite end

General information
- Location: Náměstí Hrdinů; Prague 4 - Nusle; Prague; Czech Republic
- Coordinates: 50.056°N 14.434°E
- Owner: Dopravní podnik hl. m. Prahy
- Line: C
- Platforms: Island platform
- Tracks: 2

Construction
- Structure type: Underground
- Platform levels: 1
- Cycle facilities: No

History
- Opened: 9 May 1974

Services
Preceding station	Prague Metro	Following station
Vyšehrad toward Letňany	Line C	Pankrác toward Háje
Location
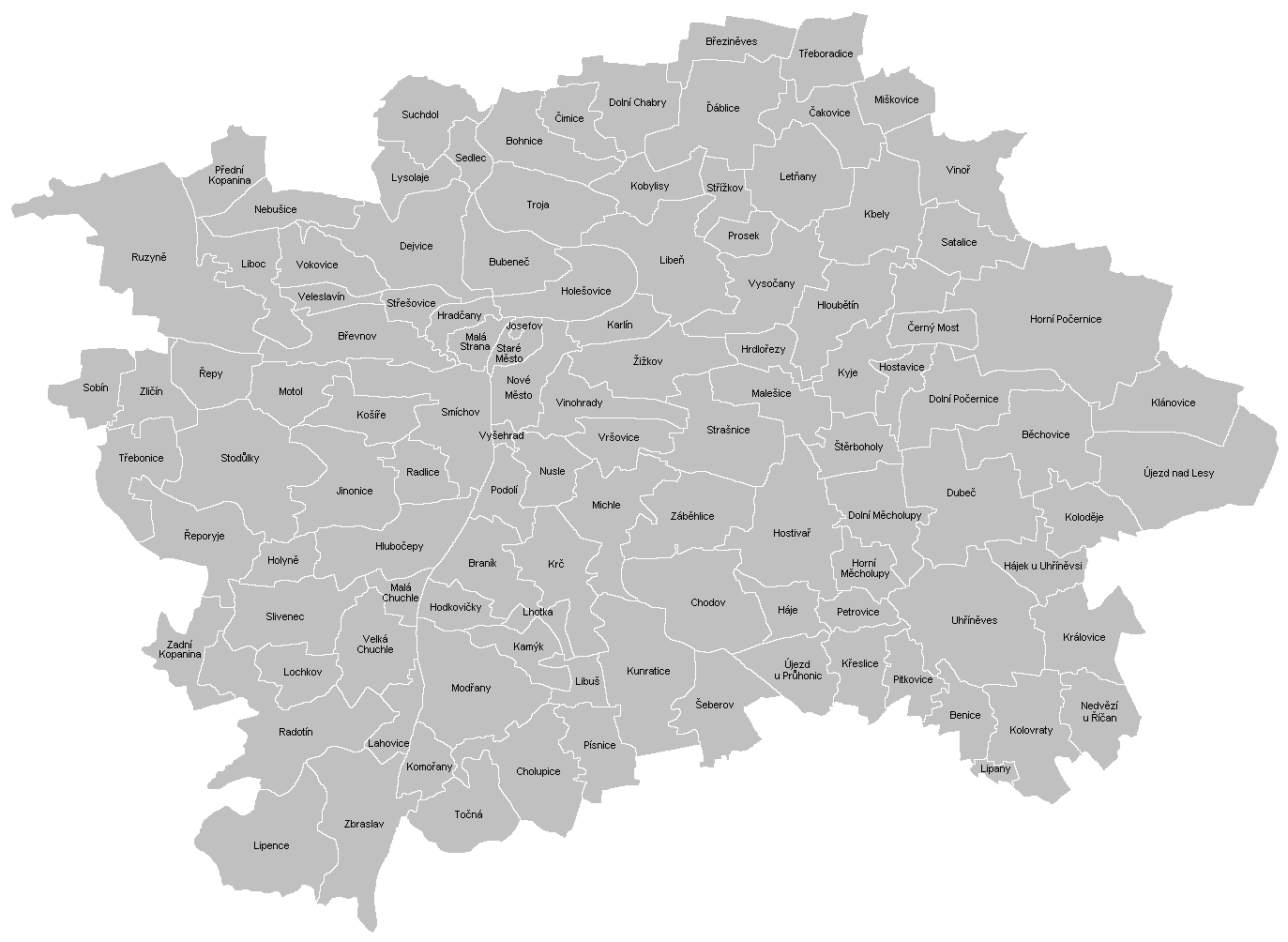
- Location within Prague Location within Greater Prague Location within Czech Republic

Pražského povstání (Czech pronunciation: [ˈpraʃskɛːɦo ˈpofstaːɲiː]) is a Prague Metro station on Line C. It is located below Náměstí Hrdinů in the neighbourhood of Pankrác (part of Nusle). The station was opened on 9 May 1974 with the first section of Prague Metro, between Sokolovská and Kačerov.

The station is a sub-surface type with a straight ceiling and depth of the platform 8 metres (26 ft) under ground level. Its name literally means [station of the] Prague Uprising.

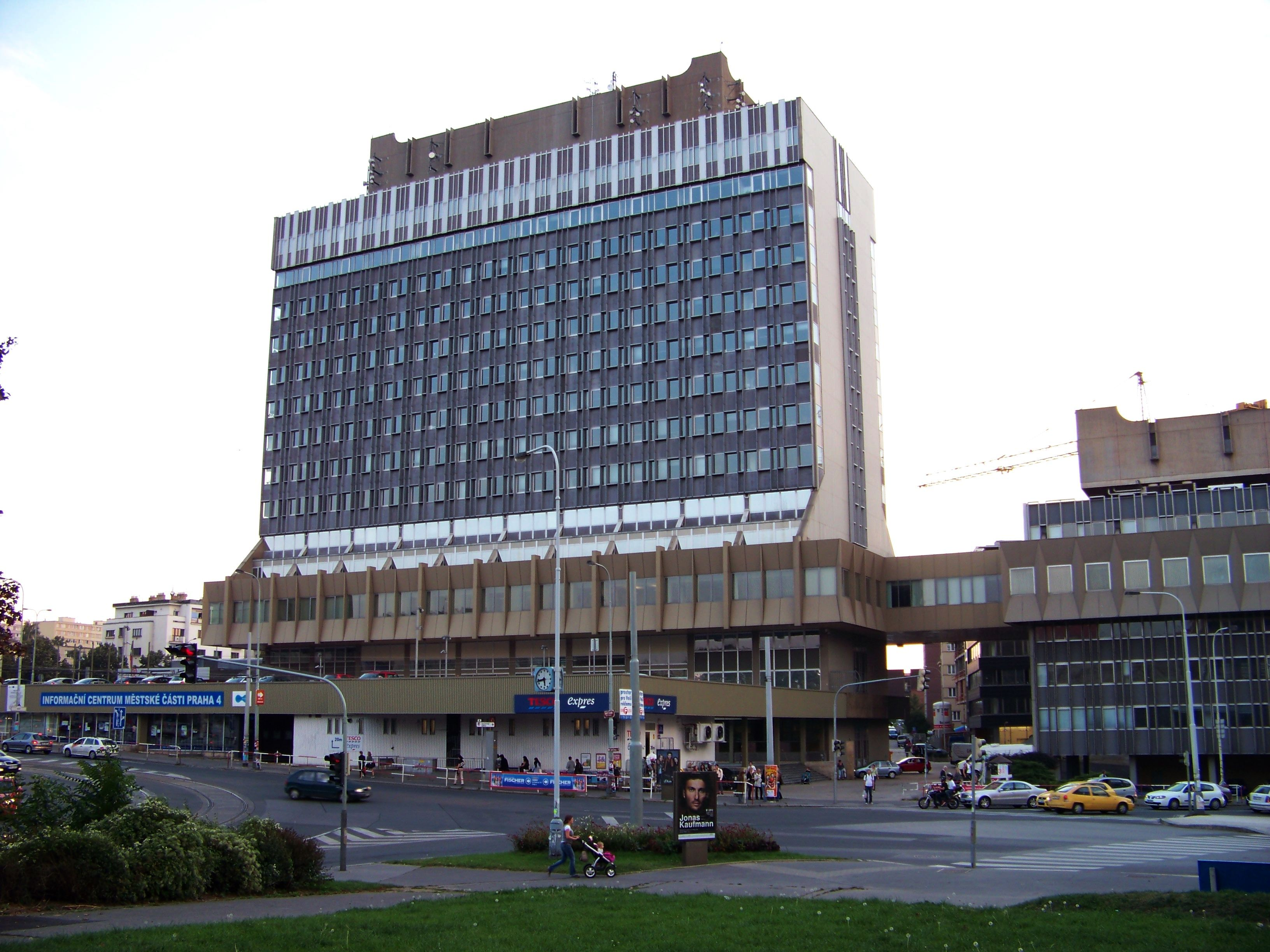
Entrance to the metro station Pražského povstání
