= Krč =

- Cadastral Area of Prague
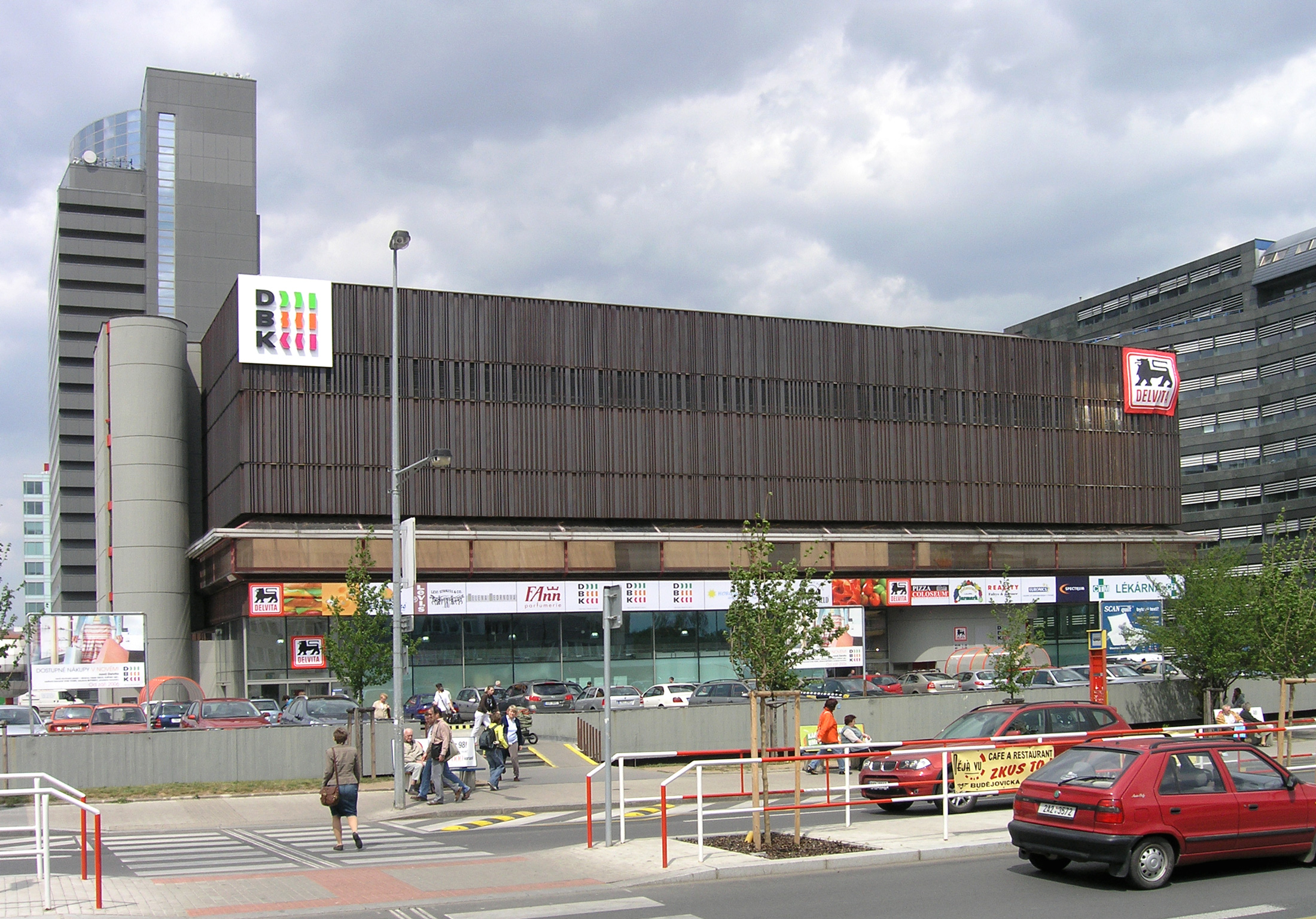
- Budějovice Square

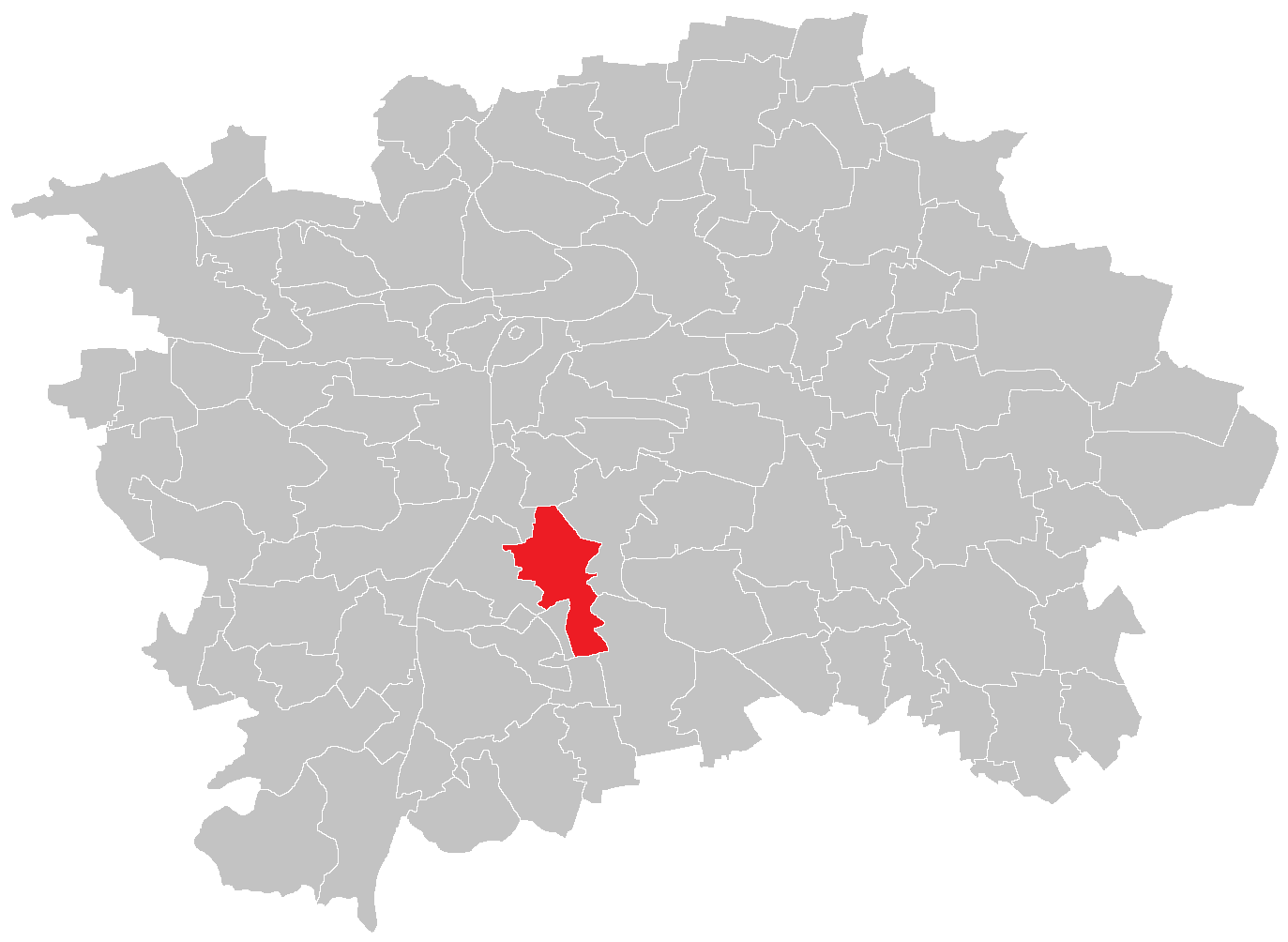
- Location of Krč in Prague
- Coordinates: 50°02′08″N 14°26′45″E
- Country: Czech Republic
- Region: Prague
- District: Prague 4

Area
  - Total: 5.21 km^{2} (2.01 sq mi)

Population (2021)
  - Total: 27,344
  - Density: 5,250/km^{2} (13,600/sq mi)
- Time zone: UTC+1 (CET)
  - Summer (DST): UTC+2 (CEST)
- Postal code: 142 00

Krč is a cadastral district in the south of Prague, located in Prague 4. It became part of the city in 1922.

== History ==
Krč (Latin: Carrium) was first mentioned in written documents in 1222. During the time of the Hussites, the area was seized by the Pražský svaz, the Hussite denomination from Prague. In 1900, Dolní Krč (lower Krč) comprised 1,354 inhabitants, a chateau, a brewery and a brickyard, and was part of the Nusle district, while Horní Krč (upper Krč) and the nearby hamlet Jalové Dvory belonged to Královské Vinohrady. In 1922, when the area became part of Prague, there were 3,700 inhabitants and 323 addresses.

== Krč today ==
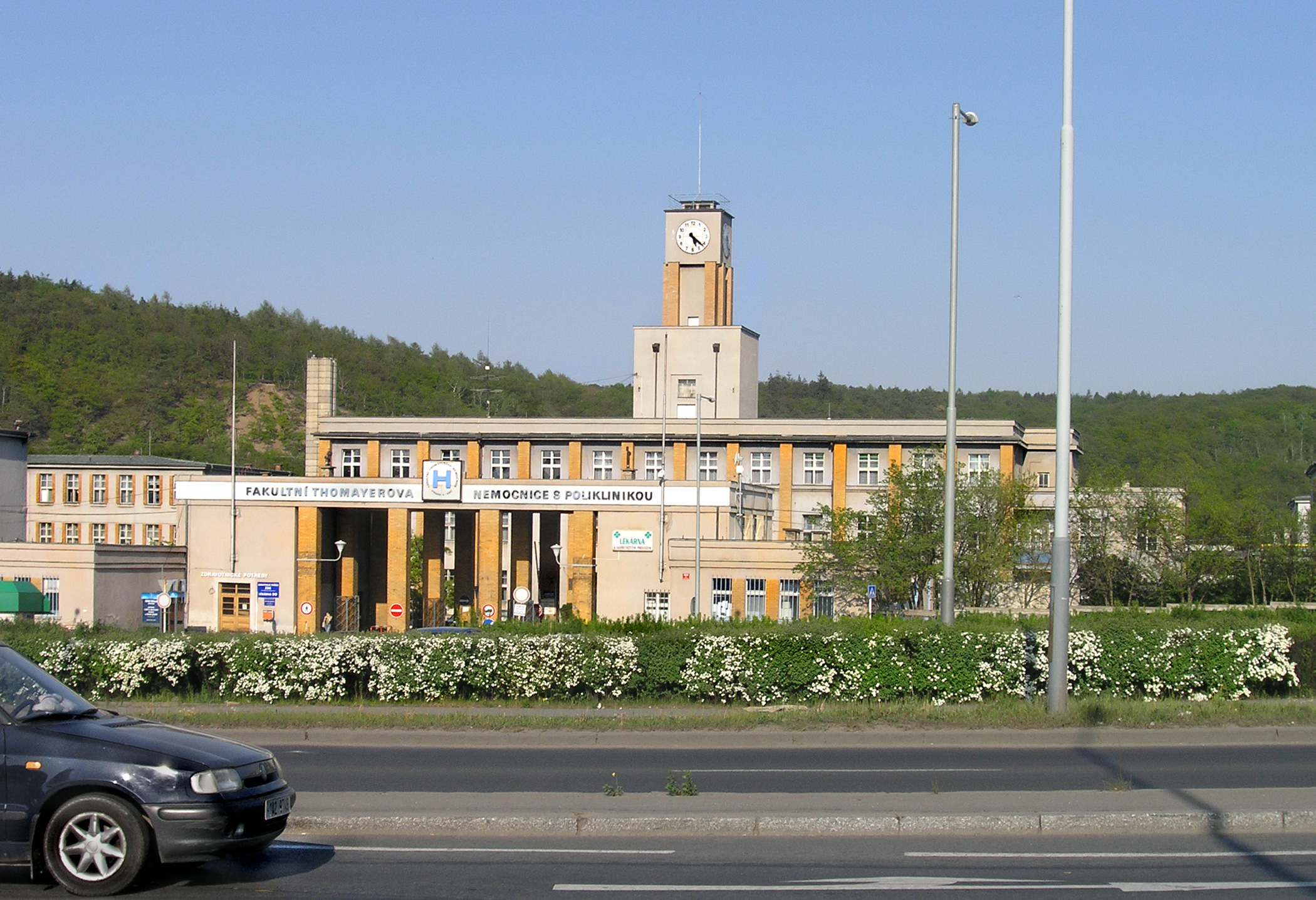
Thomayer hospital

Places of interest in Krč include the neo-gothic Chateau constructed in the mid 19th century, and Thomayer University Hospital, the largest health facility in the south of Prague. The hospital premises are also home to the Institute for Clinical and Experimental Medicine (IKEM). The district is also home to many large office blocks, including the headquarters of Česká Spořitelna (a subsidiary of Erste Group), located around Budějovické náměstí and Budějovická metro station.

== Demographics ==
Historical population

Year	Pop.	±%
1869	1,190	—
1880	1,340	+12.6%
1890	1,903	+42.0%
1900	2,329	+22.4%
1910	3,200	+37.4%
1921	3,723	+16.3%
1930	9,911	+166.2%
1950	18,468	+86.3%

Year	Pop.	±%
1961	22,088	+19.6%
1970	33,333	+50.9%
1980	31,596	−5.2%
1991	27,664	−12.4%
2001	26,978	−2.5%
2011	27,505	+2.0%
2021	27,334	−0.6%

Source: Censuses

== Transport ==
Krč is served by line C of the Prague Metro. Pankrác, Budějovická and Kačerov stations all have onward bus connections to Krč. The planned line D of the Prague Metro will pass through Krč, directly serving Thomayer hospital, and interchanging with Praha-Krč railway station.

== Sport ==
- SK Sparta Krč - football club

== Notable residents ==
Writers Antal Stašek and Ivan Olbracht lived in a villa located in the northern part of Krč. Today, two main roads leading through the district are named in their honour, as well as the Sídliště Antala Staška housing estate, located south-west of Budějovické náměstí.
