= Chodov (Prague Metro) =

Metro station in the Czech Republic

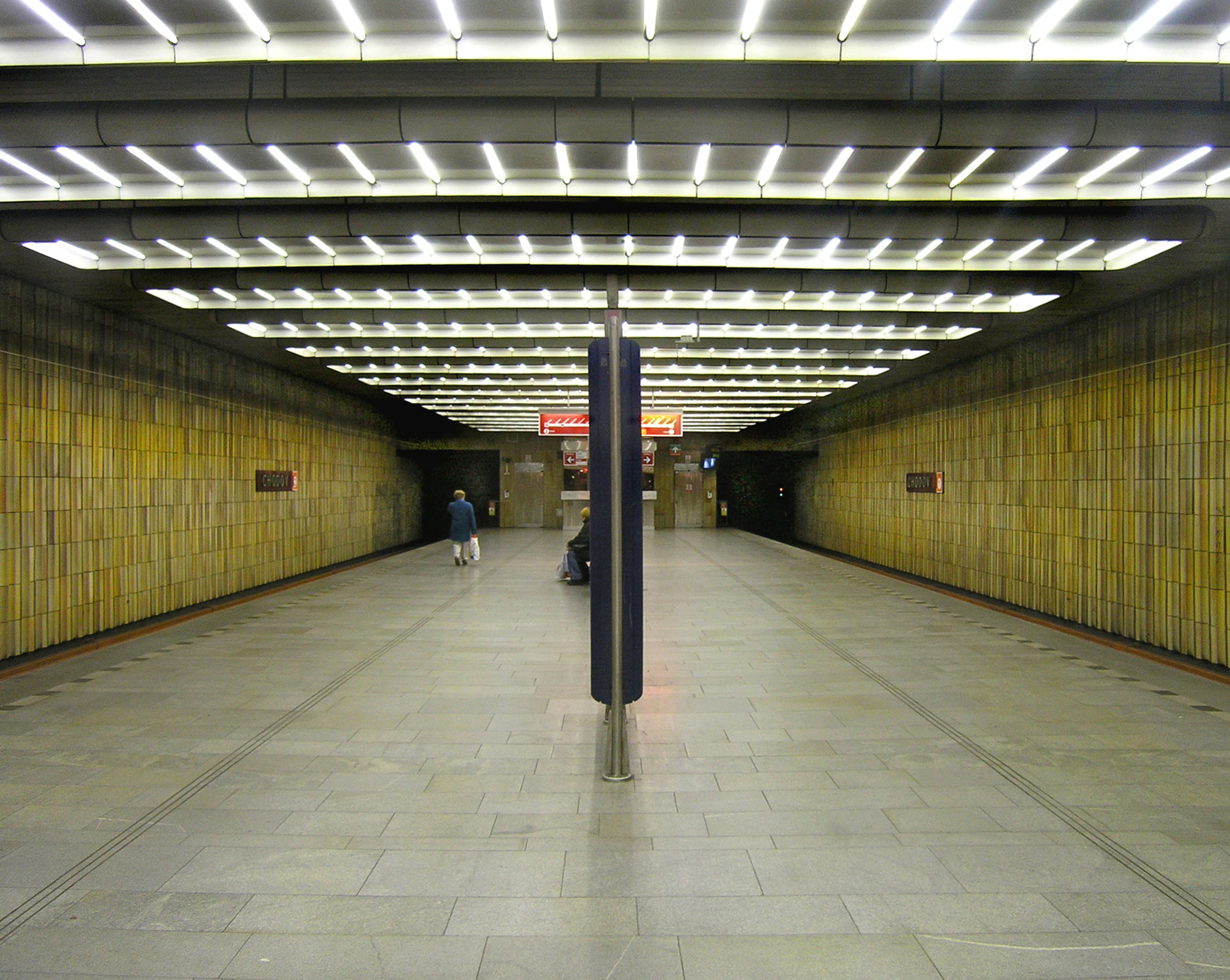
- Platform

General information
- Location: Chodov; Prague 11; Prague; Czech Republic
- Coordinates: 50.031°N 14.491°E
- System: Prague Metro station
- Owner: Dopravní podnik hl. m. Prahy
- Line: C
- Platforms: Island platform
- Tracks: 2

Construction
- Structure type: Underground
- Platform levels: 1
- Cycle facilities: No
- Accessible: Yes

History
- Opened: 7 November 1980

Services
Preceding station	Prague Metro	Following station
Roztyly toward Letňany	Line C	Opatov toward Háje
Location
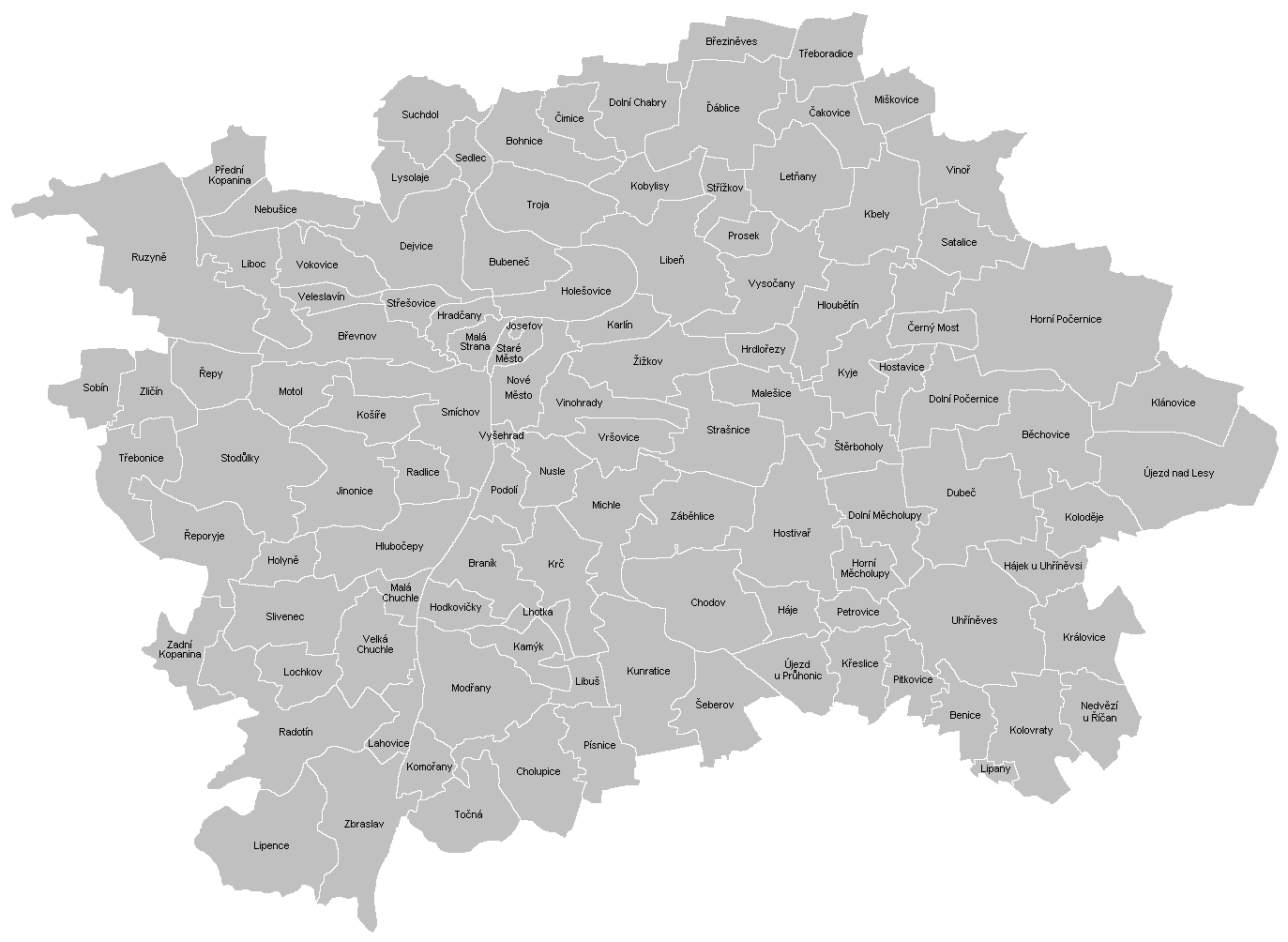
- Location within Prague Location within Greater Prague Location within Czech Republic

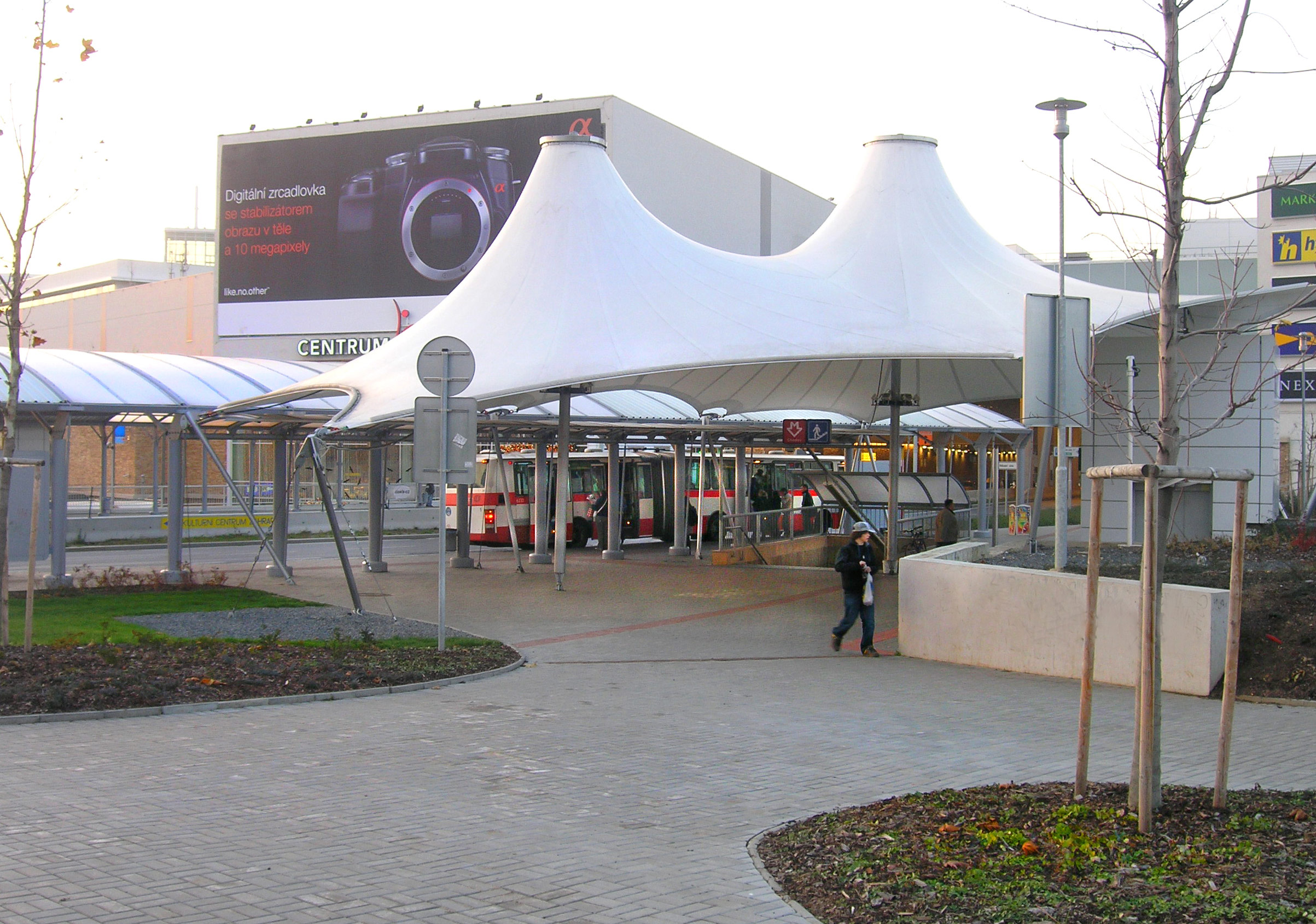
Surface entrance with part of the shopping centre in the background

Chodov (Czech pronunciation: [ˈxodof]) is a Prague Metro station on the second section of Line C. It was opened on 7 November 1980 as part of the extension from Kačerov to Kosmonautů (currently Háje).

The station is located under Roztylská Street in the southwestern part of the Chodov district. It is a shallow sub-surface station with a straight ceiling and an island platform 10 m below ground level. Centrum Chodov, the largest shopping centre in the Czech Republic, was built next to the station in 2005.

The station was named Budovatelů until 1990.
