= Pankrác (Prague Metro) =

Prague metro station

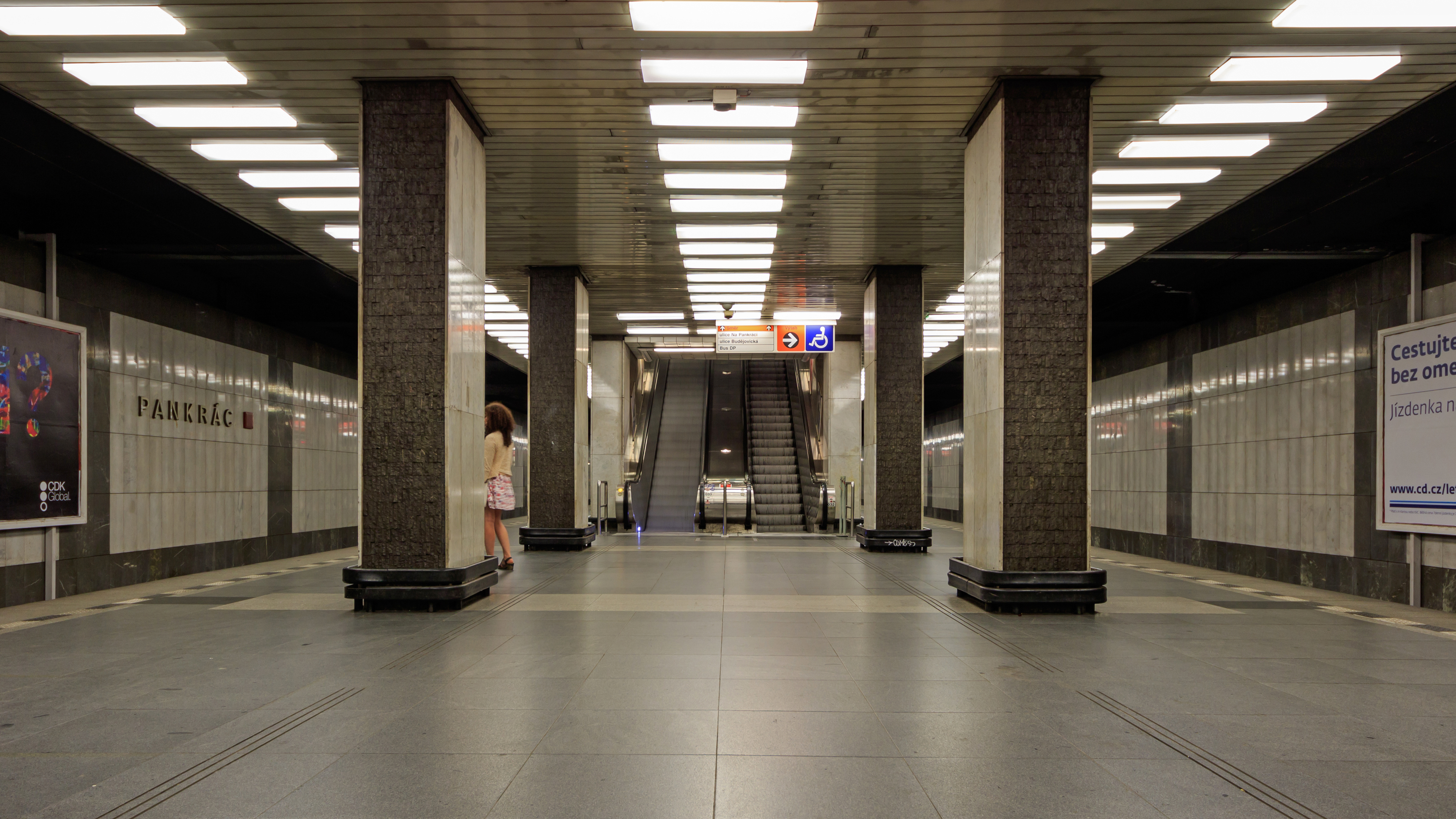
- Pankrác metro station platform

General information
- Location: Na Pankráci; Prague 4 - Nusle; Prague; Czech Republic
- Coordinates: 50.051°N 14.439°E
- System: Prague Metro
- Owner: Dopravní podnik hl. m. Prahy
- Line: C
- Platforms: Island platform
- Tracks: 2

Construction
- Structure type: Underground
- Platform levels: 1
- Cycle facilities: No
- Accessible: Yes

Other information
- Fare zone: 0

History
- Opened: 9 May 1974; 19 December 2025 (reopened)
- Closed: 6 January 2025

Services
Preceding station	Prague Metro	Following station
Pražského povstání toward Letňany	Line C	Budějovická toward Háje
Location
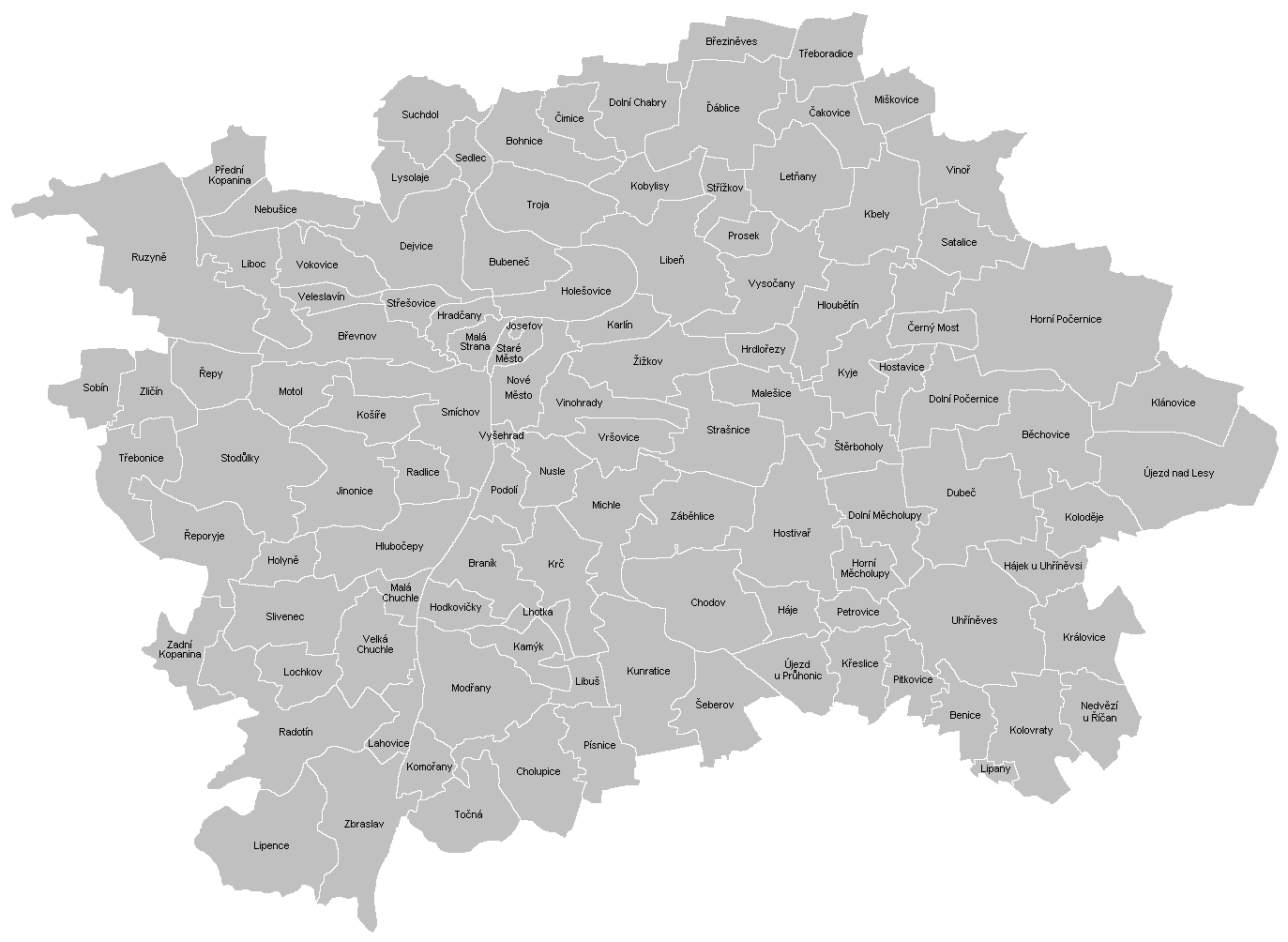
- Location within Prague Location within Greater Prague Location within Czech Republic

Pankrác (Czech pronunciation: [ˈpaŋkraːts]) is a Prague Metro station on Line C, located in the neighbourhood of Pankrác (part of Nusle) in Prague 4. The station was formerly known as Mládežnická. It was opened on 9 May 1974 with the first section of Prague Metro, between Sokolovská and Kačerov. The station serves the Arkády Pankrác shopping centre.

A tram extension was constructed to the station in 2021. The station was closed on January 6, 2025 for a year for renovations in connection with the construction of Line D. After the opening of Line D, Pankrác will become a transfer station. After a long year of renovating, Pankrác was reopened as of December 12, 2025.
