= Roztyly (Prague Metro) =

Prague metro station

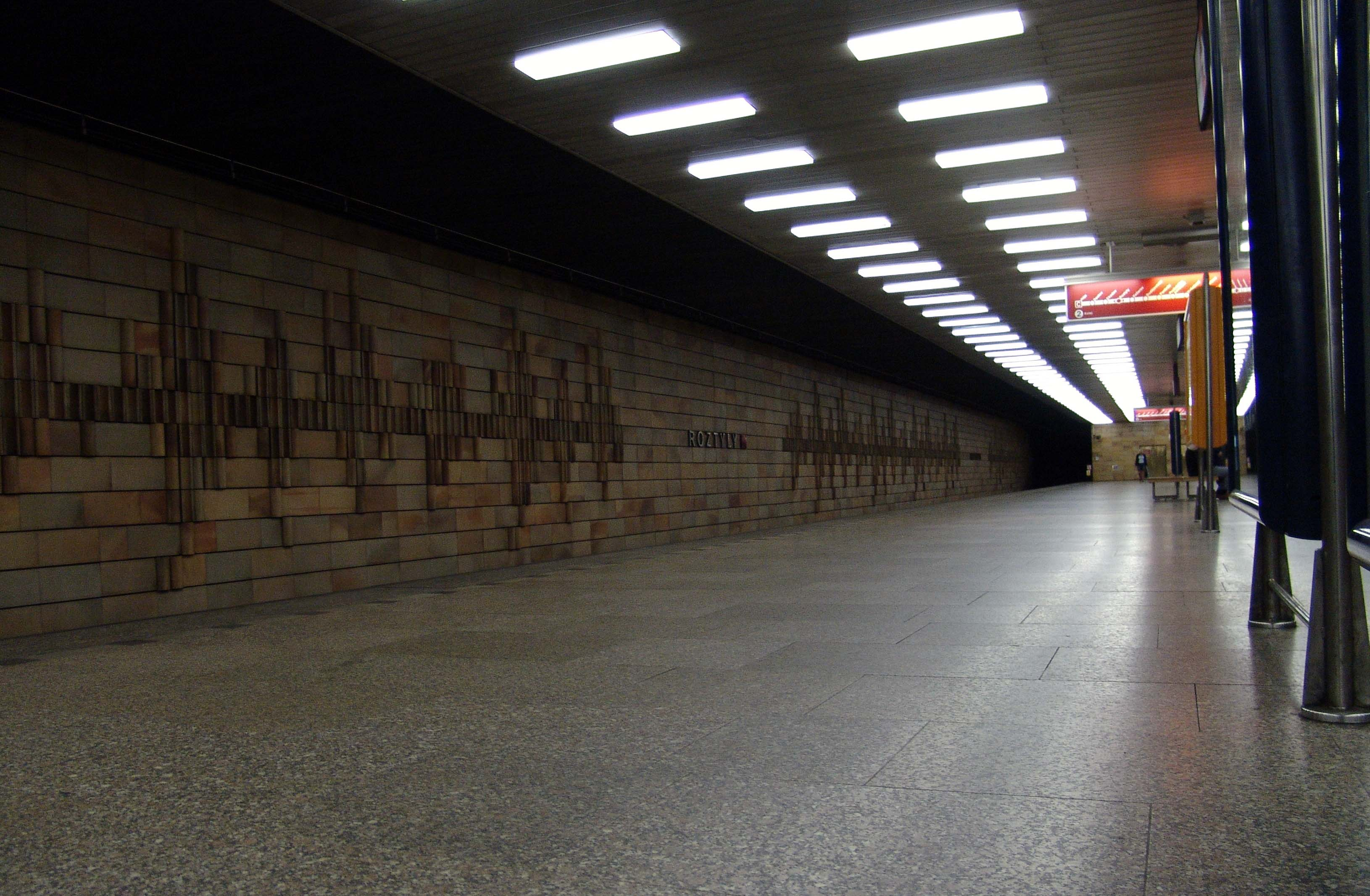
- Platform

General information
- Location: Roztyly; Prague 11; Prague; Czech Republic
- Coordinates: 50.037°N 14.478°E
- System: Prague Metro station
- Owner: Dopravní podnik hl. m. Prahy
- Line: C
- Platforms: Island platform
- Tracks: 2

Construction
- Structure type: Underground
- Platform levels: 1
- Cycle facilities: No
- Accessible: Yes

History
- Opened: 7 November 1980

Services
Preceding station	Prague Metro	Following station
Kačerov toward Letňany	Line C	Chodov toward Háje
Location
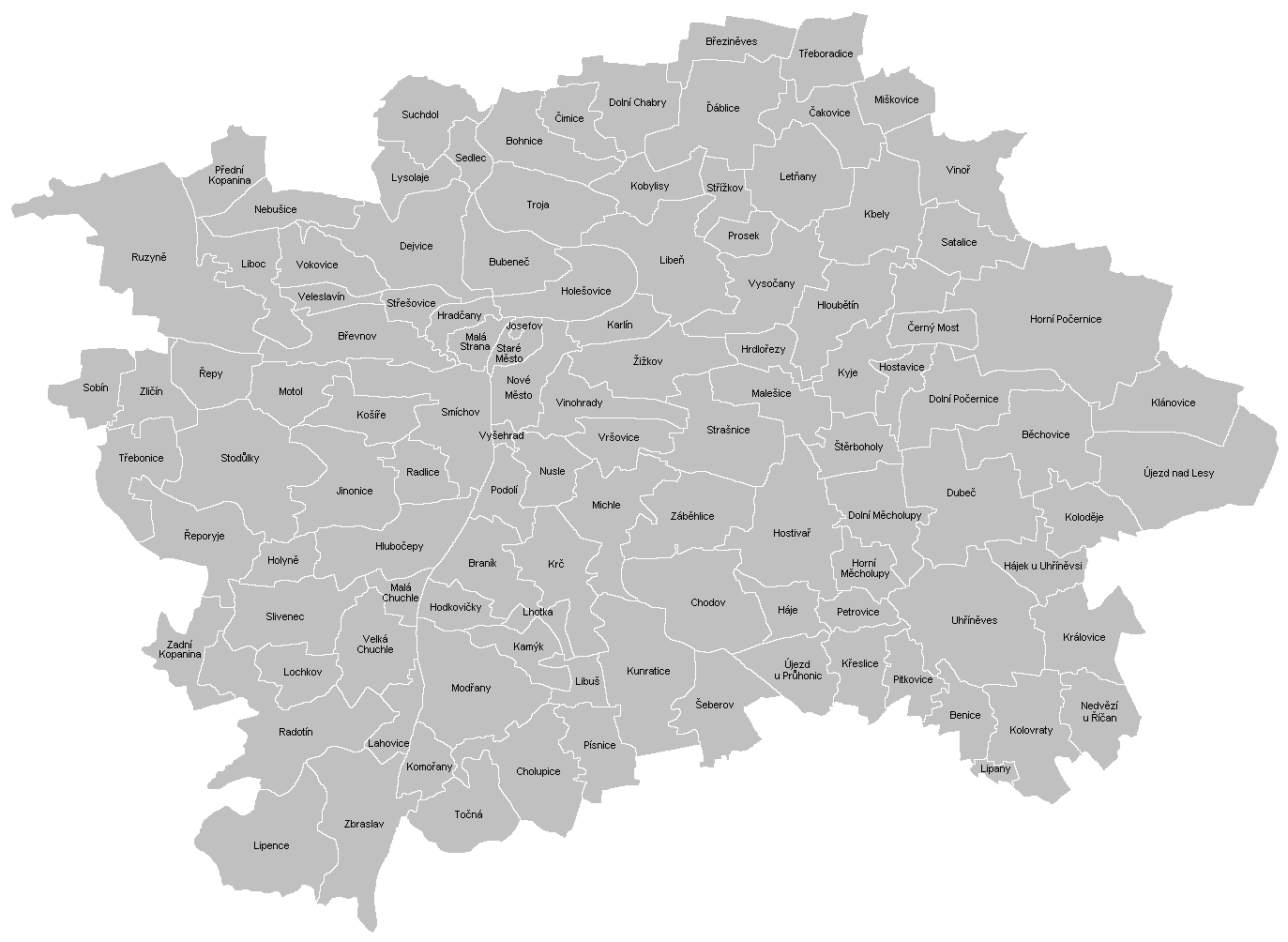
- Location within Prague Location within Greater Prague Location within Czech Republic

Roztyly (Czech pronunciation: [rostɪlɪ]) is a Prague Metro station on Line C, located on the northern edge of Kunratický les in Prague 11. It was opened on 7 November 1980 as part of the extension from Kačerov to Kosmonautů (currently Háje).

The station was formerly known as Primátora Vacka after communist politician Václav Vacek.

Roztyly station is adjacent to a bus station served by intercity and international services.
