= Muzeum (Prague Metro) =

Prague metro station

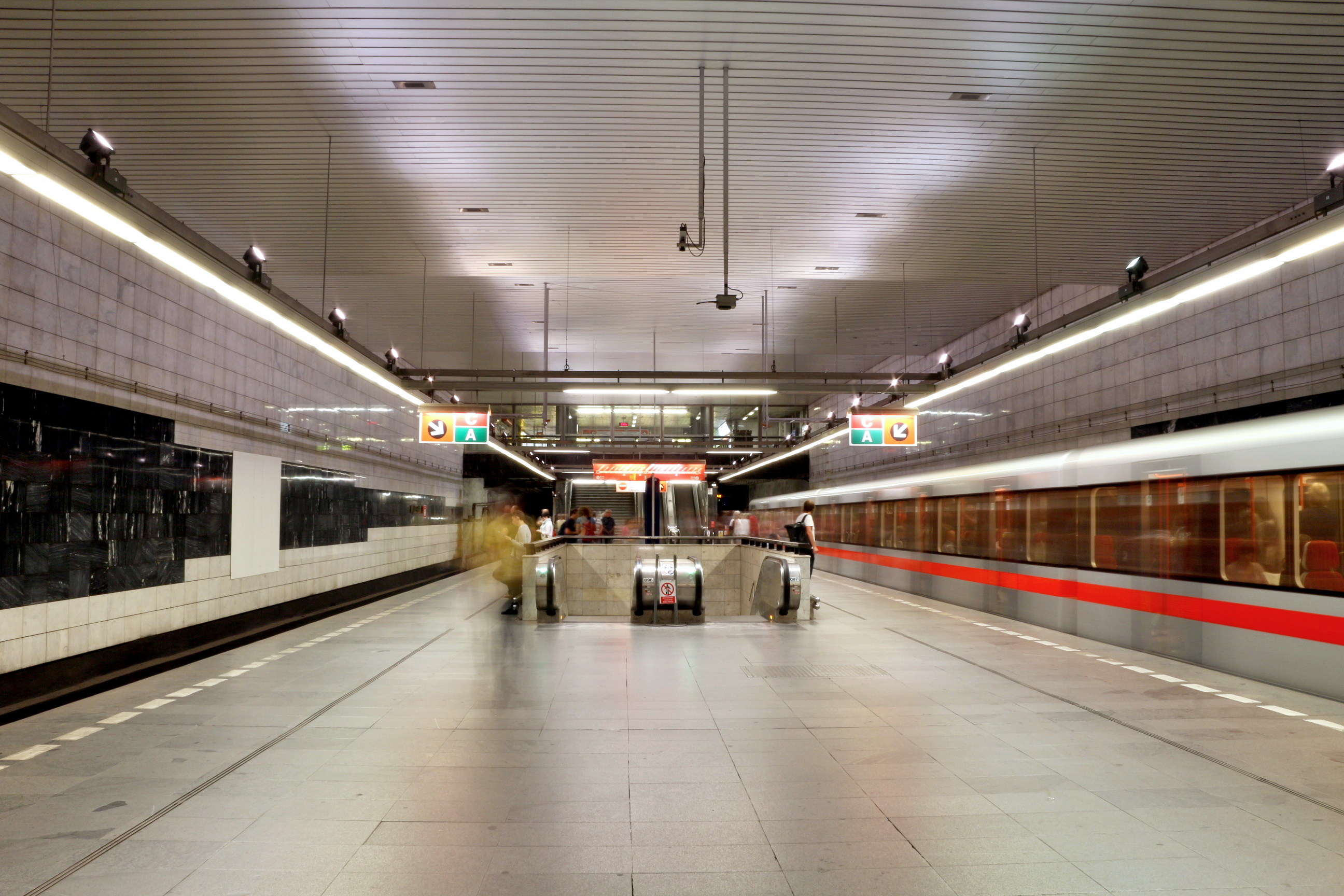
- Platform Line C

General information
- Location: Wenceslas Square / National Museum; Prague 1 – Nové Město; Czech Republic
- Coordinates: 50.0798°N 14.4306°E
- System: Prague Metro
- Owner: Dopravní podnik hl. m. Prahy
- Line: A C
- Platforms: 2 island platforms
- Tracks: 4
- Connections: Tram and bus services at Wenceslas Square

Construction
- Structure type: Underground
- Depth: A: 34 metres C: 10 metres
- Platform levels: 2
- Parking: No
- Cycle facilities: No
- Accessible: Yes

Other information
- Fare zone: PID: Prague

History
- Opened: C 9 May 1974; 52 years ago A 12 August 1978; 48 years ago

Services
Preceding station	Prague Metro	Following station
Můstek toward Nemocnice Motol	Line A	Náměstí Míru toward Depo Hostivař
Hlavní nádraží toward Letňany	Line C	I. P. Pavlova toward Háje
Location
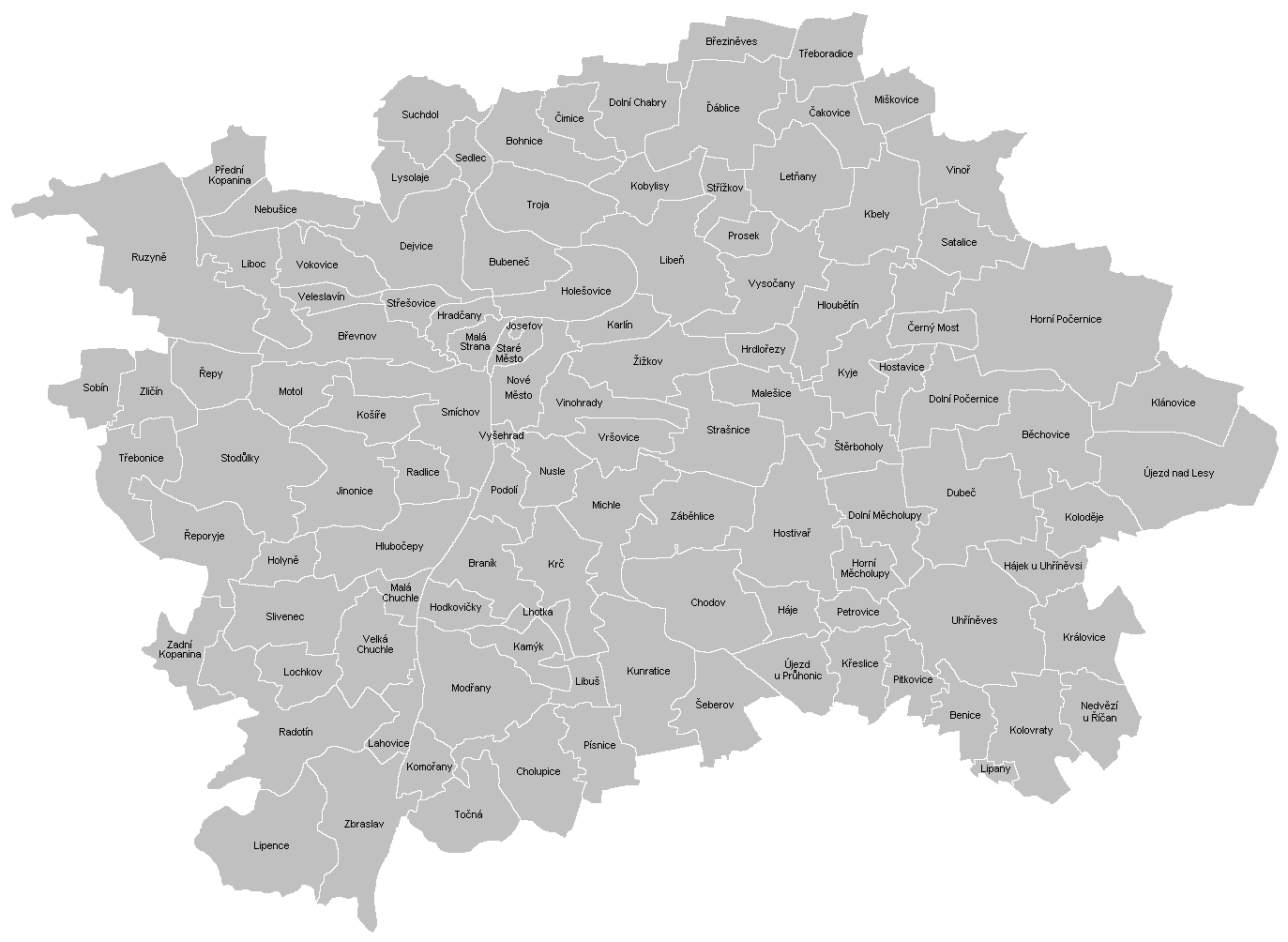
- Location within Prague Location within Greater Prague Location within Czech Republic

Muzeum (Czech pronunciation: [ˈmuzɛu̯m]) is a major interchange station on the Prague Metro, located directly beneath Wenceslas Square and the historic building of the National Museum. It serves as a transfer point between Line A and Line C. The station opened in two phases: the Line C part on 9 May 1974 and the Line A part on 12 August 1978.

== Line A station ==
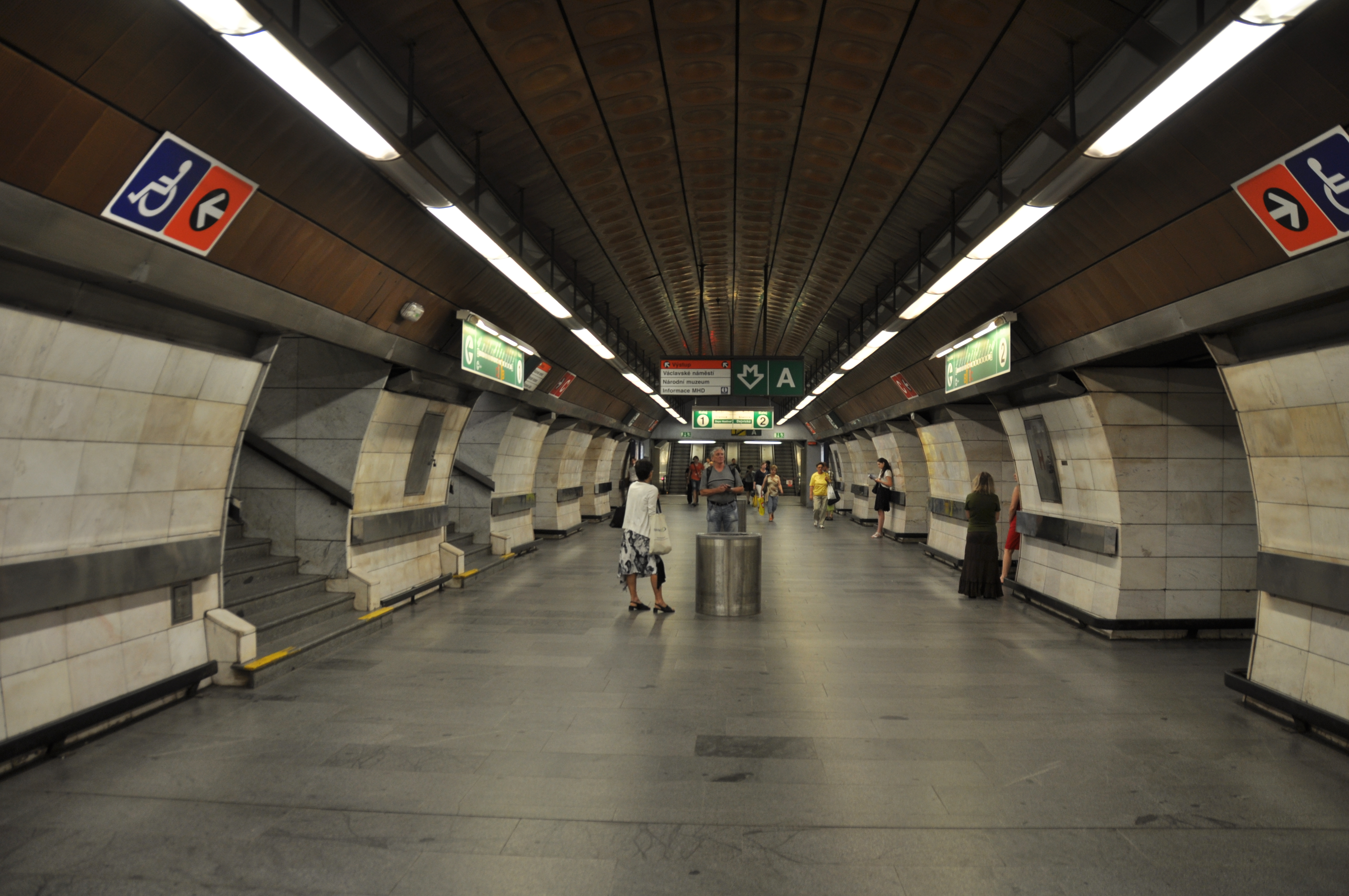
View on Platform Line A

The Line A station is a mined, three-aisled, column-type structure. Its central nave is shortened to 69.1 metres and connects to the side platforms through nine pairs of cross-passages. The station lies 34 metres below the surface. From the central nave, an escalator tunnel descends beneath the Line C platform, where short escalators provide direct access to the Line C island platform.

The station's exit is located laterally above the southern track in a separate escalator tunnel outside the main station axis; it connects to the platform via a corridor and stairs. The interior features brown anodised aluminium cladding and marble panels. Construction costs for the Line A part, excluding lifts, amounted to 230 million Czechoslovak crowns.

From July 2017 to May 2018, the Line A platform underwent reconstruction while remaining in operation. Sections of the platform were temporarily closed: the Depo Hostivař-bound side from 11 July to 11 December 2017, and the Nemocnice Motol-bound side from 3 January to 20 May 2018. During these periods, trains served the station in only one direction, passing through in the opposite direction.

== Line C station ==
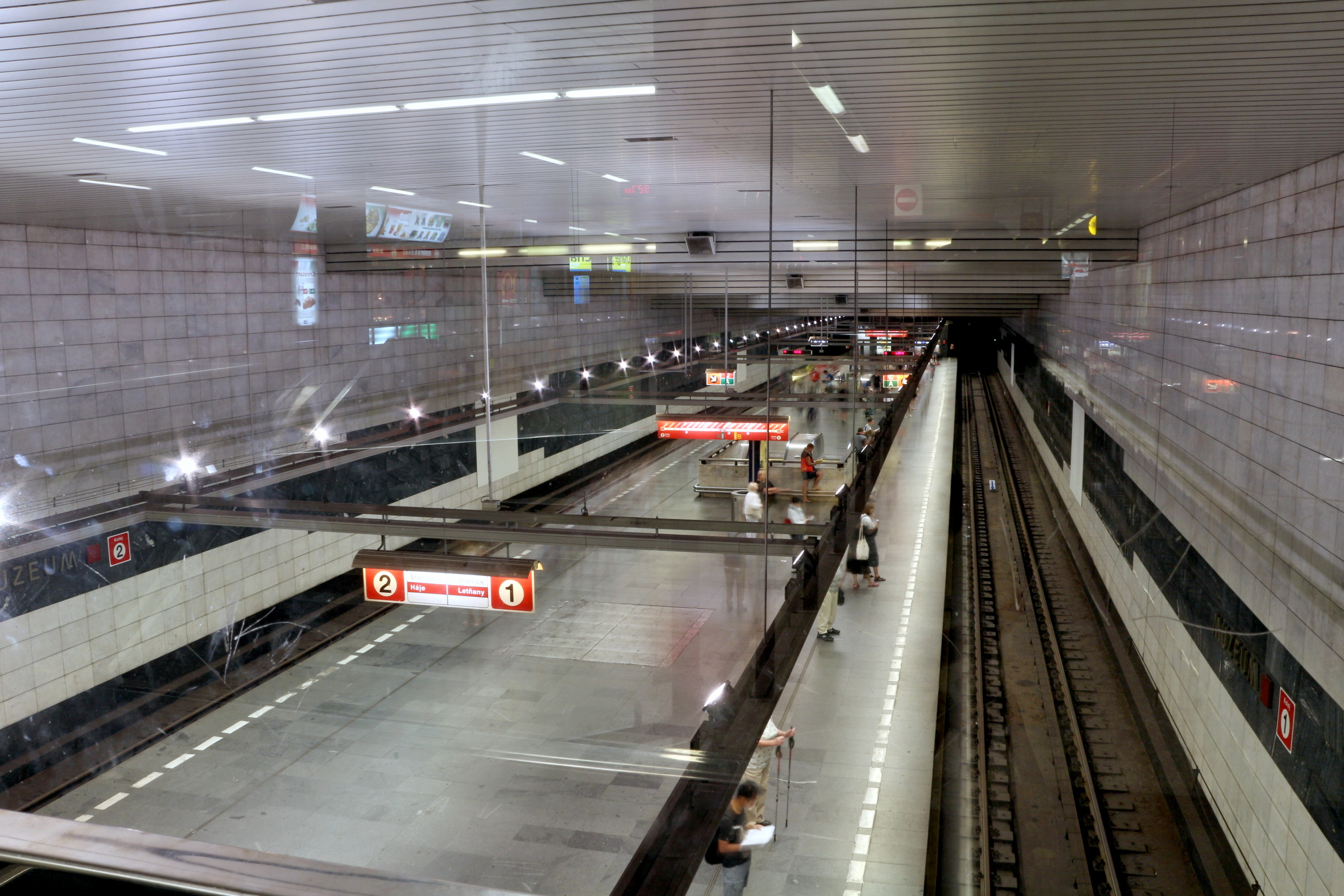
View on Platform Line C

The Line C station lies close to the surface and runs longitudinally beneath the main north–south road (Wilsonova). The platform hall, located 10 metres underground, is a large open space without internal columns. A staircase leads from the platform to a shared underground concourse serving both Line A and Line C. In the centre of the hall are the escalator landings for transfers from Line A.

The walls are clad in marble, and the ceiling descends in a stepped pattern toward Hlavní nádraží. The station is built using diaphragm walls with a prefabricated roof.

Construction proceeded in three stages. The first included the section between Wilsonova (then Vítězného Února) and Washingtonova streets. The second covered the area between the statue of Saint Wenceslas and the National Museum; shafts were driven and foundations for steel columns were concreted, supporting prefabricated roof beams while excavation continued beneath. The third stage comprised the deepest central section, which includes the transfer to Line A. To preserve groundwater levels, a hydrological gallery was constructed, and the station required extensive waterproofing.

Construction involved the removal of 89,300 m^{3} of soil and rock, installation of 10,920 m^{2} of diaphragm walls and 600 m^{2} of bored pile walls, and the placement of 14,170 m^{3} of cast-in-place concrete and 2,500 m^{3} of prefabricated components. The ceiling reinforcement was designed by Professor Josef Wünsche, and in 1973 a Mi-8 helicopter assisted with placing steel columns. After structural work, final lining and finishing followed.

== Reconstruction ==
On 19 August 1993, the short two-flight escalator on Line C was replaced: the original Transporta unit was removed and a new OTIS escalator installed. The station also received upgrades to its technological systems and low-voltage wiring. In the late 1990s the ceiling panels were replaced, and the original ceiling-mounted luminaires were substituted with two rows of suspended lighting units.

Between 16 June and 10 November 2001, the transfer corridor was reconstructed, including replacement of the transfer escalators with new units from Schindler and Thyssen.

== Accessibility ==
Originally, Muzeum station was equipped only with escalators. In the late 1990s a lift was planned to improve accessibility.

From 9 March to 22 June 1999, a lift for mobility-impaired passengers was installed at the Line C part of the station. In 2003, construction began on a lift for the Line A section, which required extending the central nave and excavating a new shaft to the surface. In 2005 the lift was placed into service; it emerges outside Wenceslas Square near the National Museum and is widely used by both disabled and non-disabled passengers.

== Inter-line connections ==
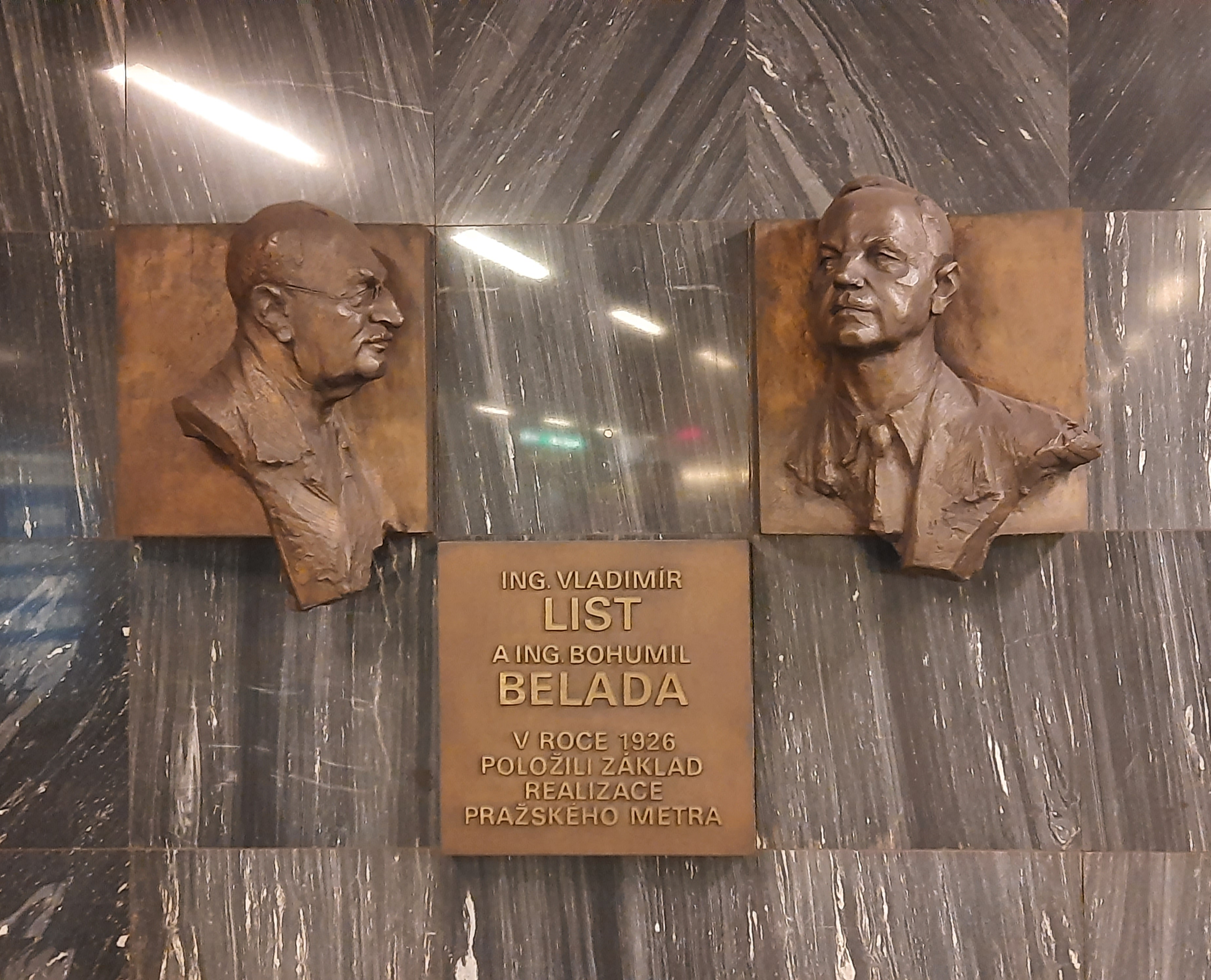
Busts of Vladimír List (left) and Bohumil Belada (Right) in the station vestibule.

Track connecting tunnels exist between Vyšehrad and I. P. Pavlova (near Line C) and between Muzeum and Náměstí Míru (Line A). These house two single-track operational links enabling rolling stock transfers between Lines A and C without reversing direction.

A widened tunnel section between Muzeum and Hlavní nádraží originates from a 1960s proposal for a subsurface tram route beneath Wenceslas Square. The design envisioned future transfers to a Dobřichovice–Poříčany railway corridor, with stations at Karlovo náměstí, Hlavní nádraží, and Florenc. The short widened section would have formed part of this line.

In 1992, busts of early 20th-century metro designers Vladimír List and Bohumil Belada were installed in the vestibule.

== Salon ==
Since 1974, the station has contained a representative salon used for hosting delegations and formal meetings. Its reconstruction was completed in 2015.

== Crime ==
On 2 August 2002, in the Line C section of the station, police officer Ján Mato was murdered while attempting to subdue a man armed with a spear. The perpetrator, Russian immigrant Alexandr Kručinin, committed suicide 27 days later in his cell.
