= Budějovická (Prague Metro) =

Prague metro station

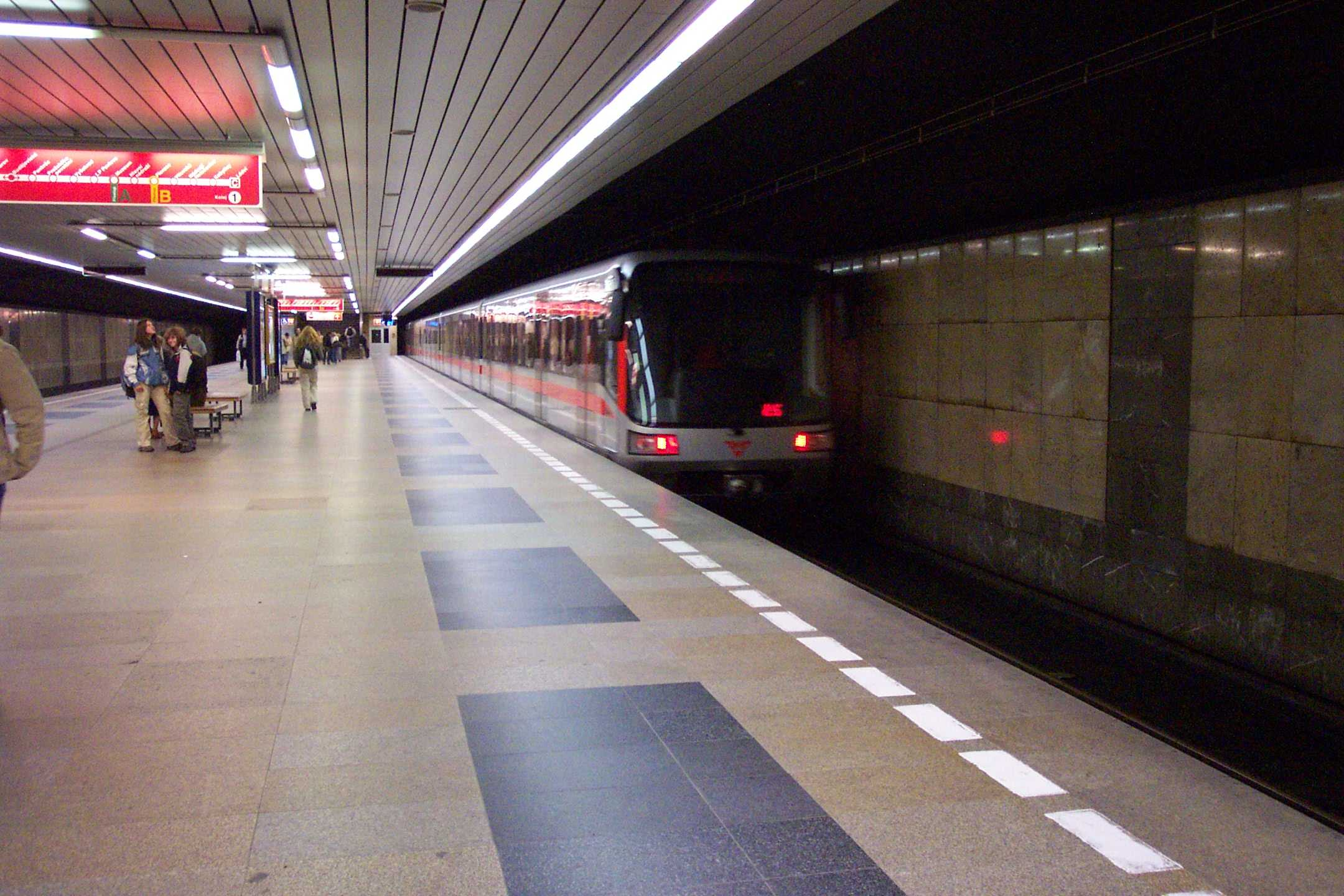
- Budějovická metro station

General information
- Location: Olbrachtova; Prague 4 - Krč; Prague; Czech Republic
- Coordinates: 50.044°N 14.449°E
- System: Prague Metro
- Owner: Dopravní podnik hl. m. Prahy
- Line: C
- Platforms: Island platform
- Tracks: 2

Construction
- Structure type: Underground
- Platform levels: 1
- Cycle facilities: No
- Accessible: Yes

History
- Opened: 9 May 1974

Services
Preceding station	Prague Metro	Following station
Pankrác toward Letňany	Line C	Kačerov toward Háje
Location
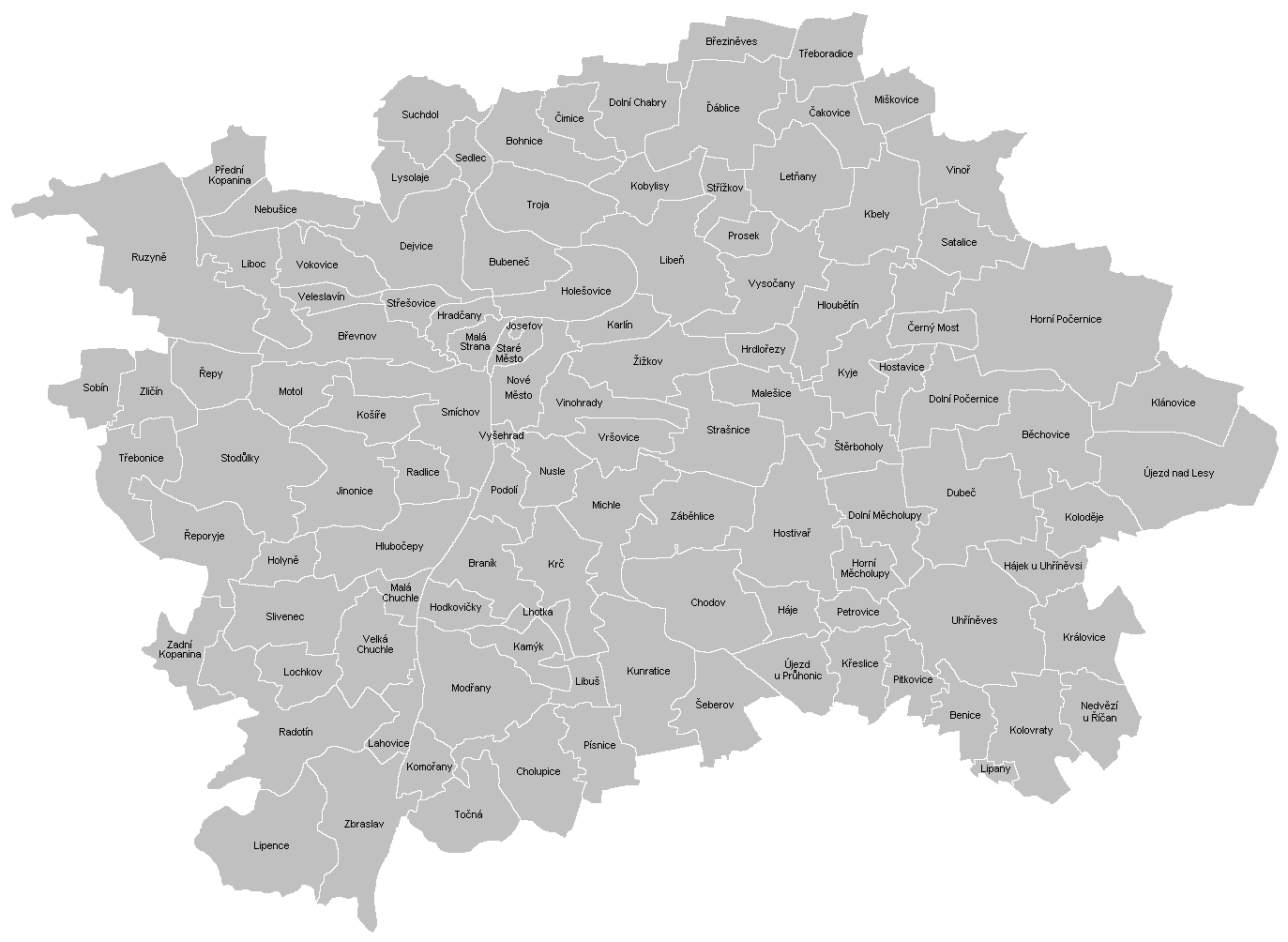
- Location within Prague Location within Greater Prague Location within Czech Republic

Budějovická (Czech pronunciation: [ˈbuɟɛjovɪtskaː]) is a Prague Metro station on Line C, located in Krč, Prague 4. It was opened on 9 May 1974 with the first section of Prague Metro, between Sokolovská (Florenc) and Kačerov.

The station has two exits, one leading to Olbrachtová street and the other to Antala Staška street. They are connected by a walkway under the DBK shopping centre.
