= Opatov (Prague Metro) =

Prague metro station

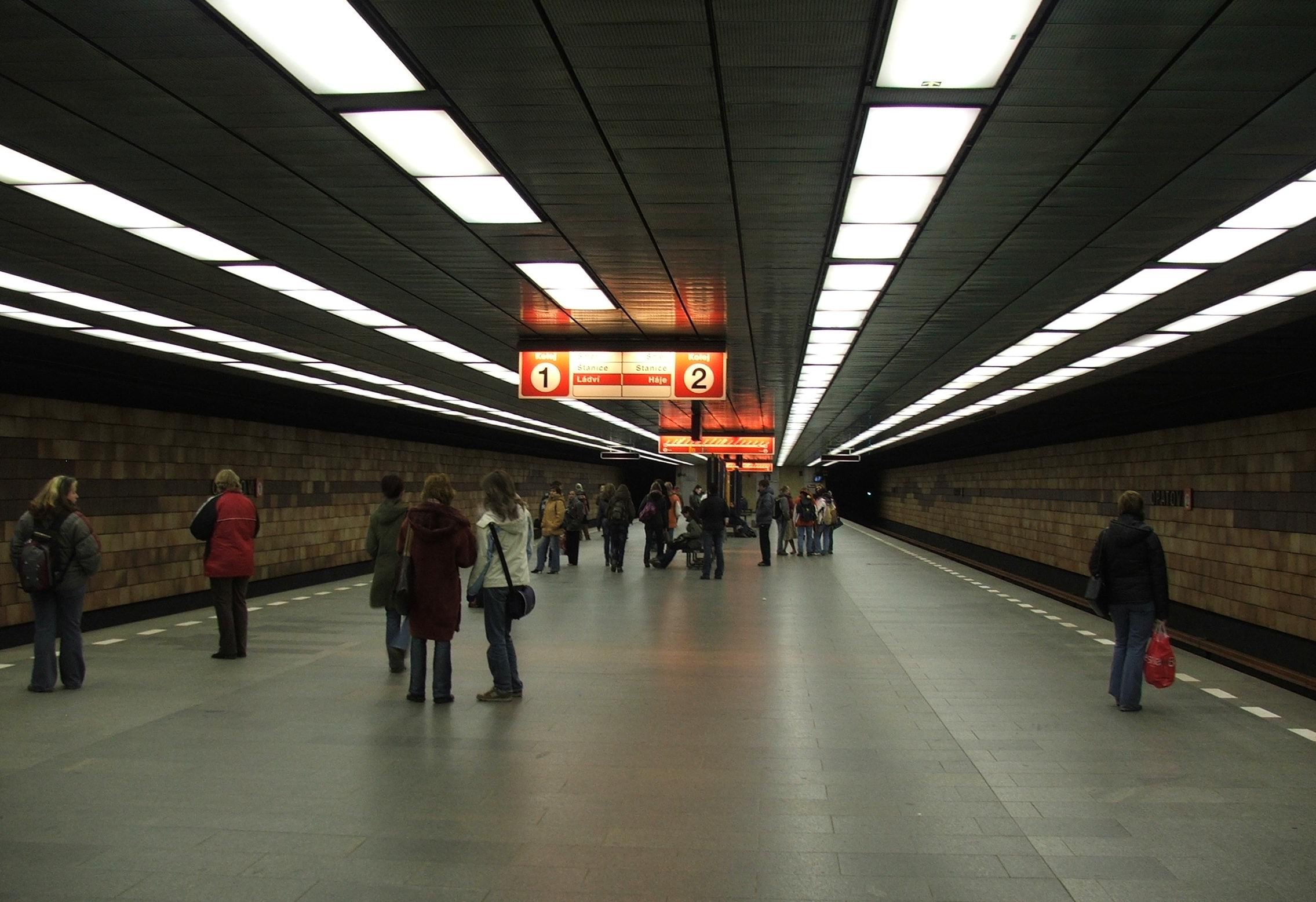
- Platform

General information
- Location: Opatov; Prague 11; Prague; Czech Republic
- Coordinates: 50.028°N 14.508°E
- System: Prague Metro station
- Owner: Dopravní podnik hl. m. Prahy
- Line: C
- Platforms: Island platform
- Tracks: 2

Construction
- Structure type: Underground
- Platform levels: 1
- Cycle facilities: No
- Accessible: Yes

History
- Opened: 7 November 1980

Services
| Preceding station | Prague Metro | Following station |
|---|---|---|
| Chodov toward Letňany | Line C | Háje Terminus |
Location
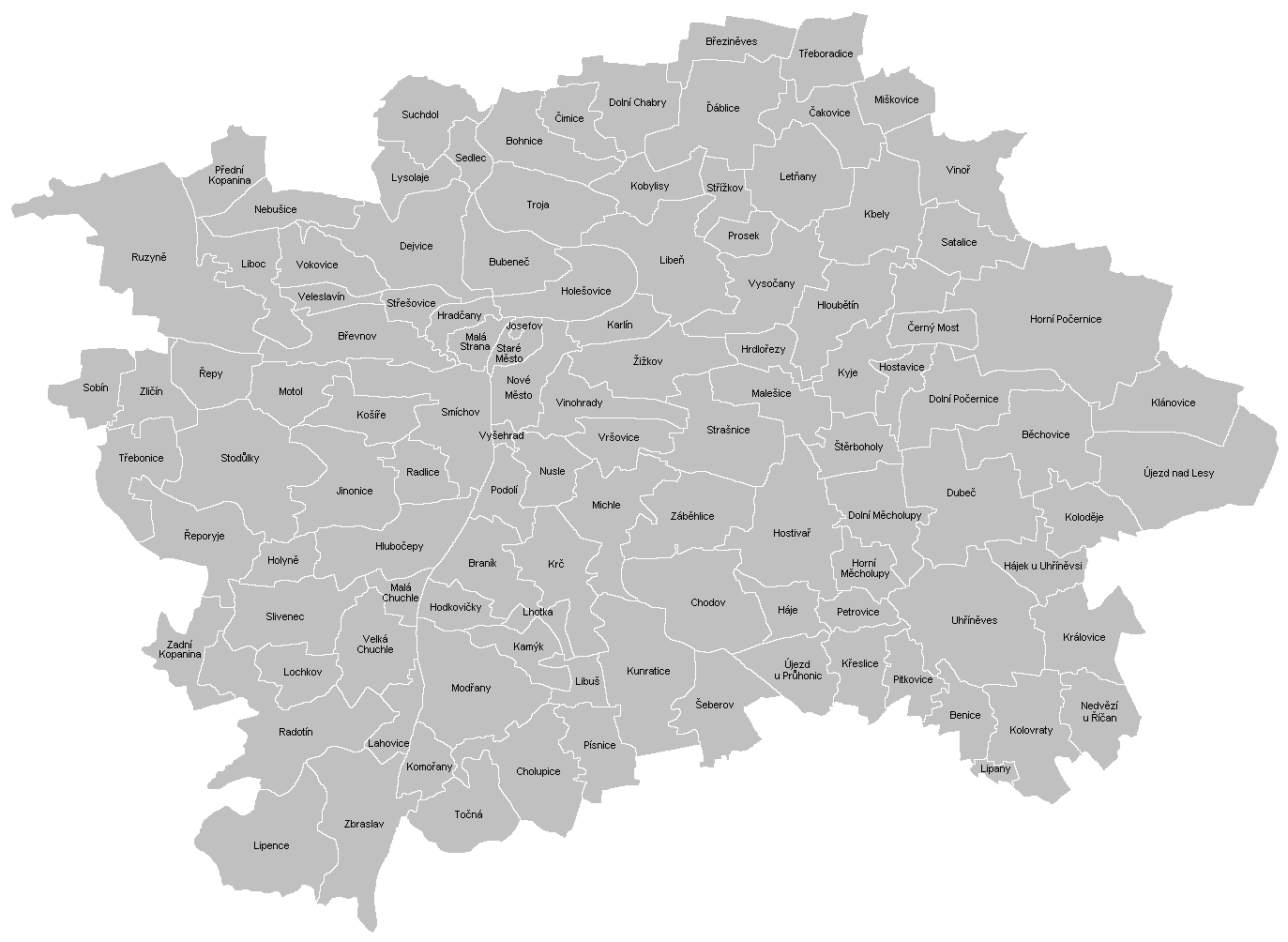
- Location within Prague Location within Greater Prague Location within Czech Republic

Opatov (Czech pronunciation: [ˈʔopatof]) is a Prague Metro station on Line C, serving Jižní Město. The station was formerly known as Družby. It was opened on 7 November 1980 as part of the extension from Kačerov to Kosmonautů (currently Háje).
