= Chodov (Prague) =

Suburb in Czechia

- Cadastral Area of Prague
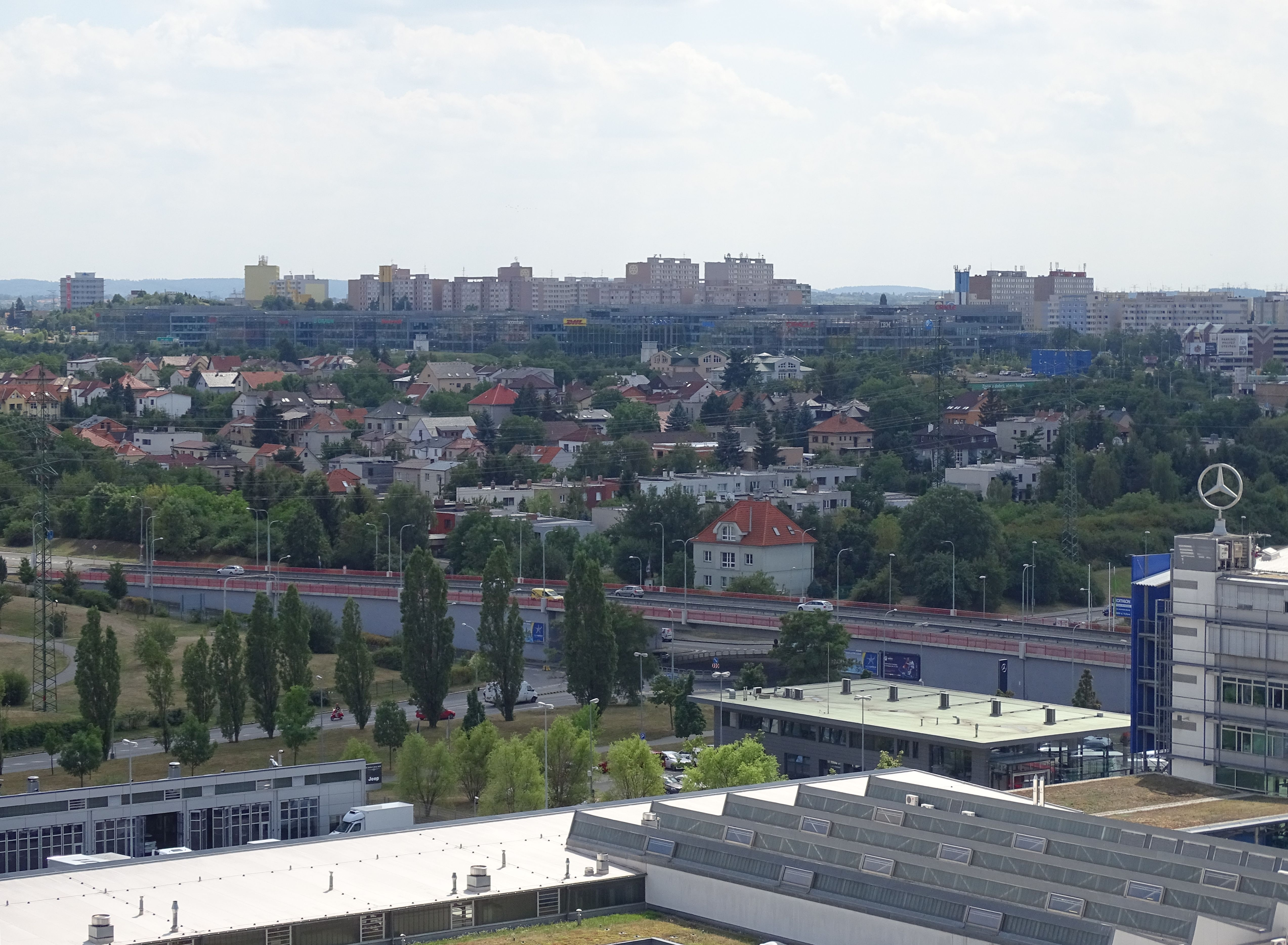
- View of Chodov, Jížní Město

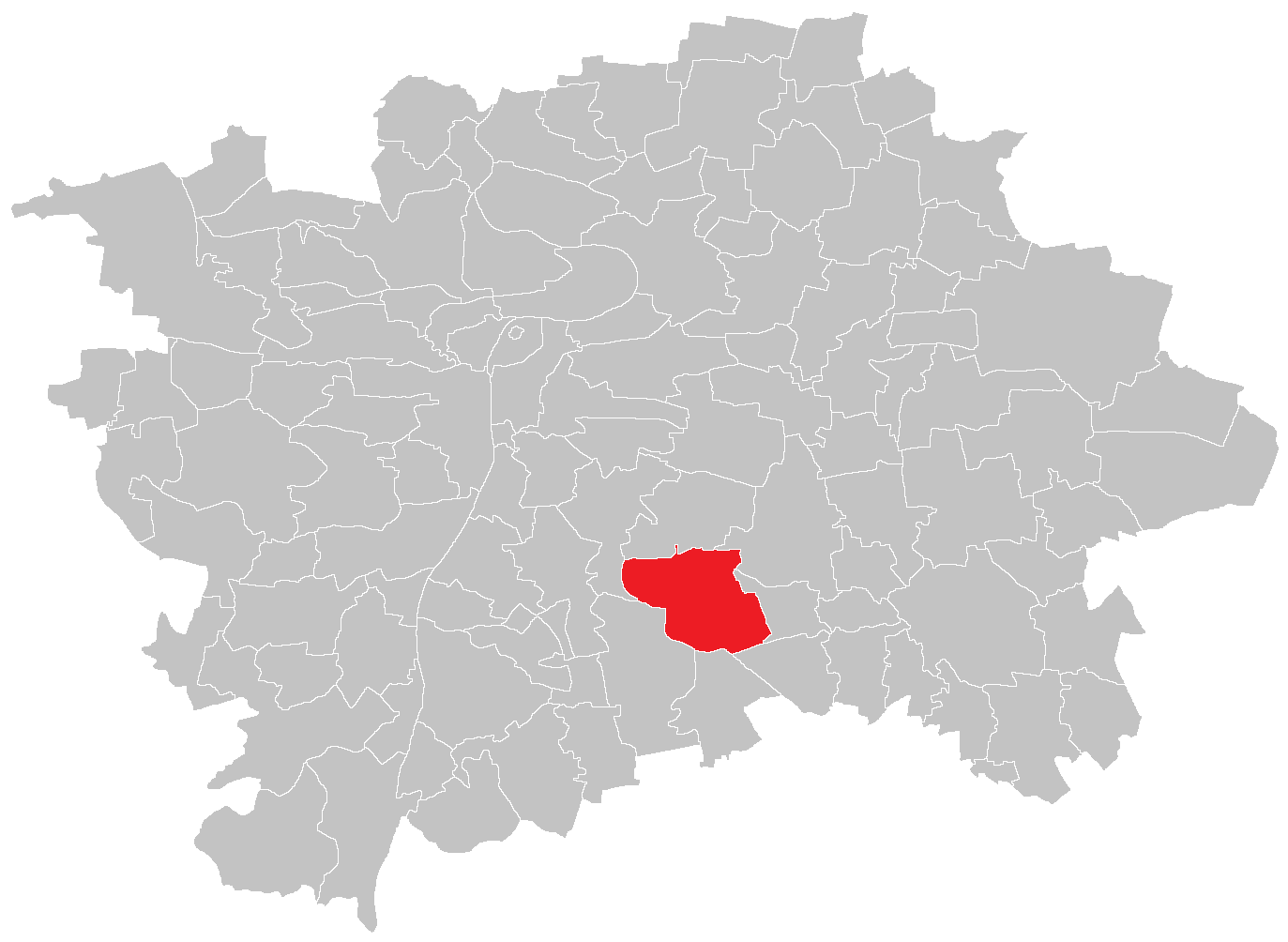
- Location of Chodov in Prague
- Coordinates: 50°01′58″N 14°30′06″E
- Country: Czech Republic
- Region: Prague
- District: Prague 11

Area
  - Total: 7.43 km^{2} (2.87 sq mi)

Population (2021)
  - Total: 50,043
  - Density: 6,740/km^{2} (17,400/sq mi)
- Time zone: UTC+1 (CET)
  - Summer (DST): UTC+2 (CEST)
- Postal code: 148 00, 149 00

Chodov (Czech pronunciation: [ˈxodof]) is a district and cadastral area of Prague, capital of the Czech Republic. It lies in the south-east of the city, and became part of the Prague municipality in 1968. In terms of the Prague districts defined in 1960, it lay in administrative district 4, and its postal address is still Prague 4. However, since 2001 it has been placed in the administrative district Prague 11; within that, it lies in the Prague 11 municipal district. It has a Metro station, on the C line. It is principally an area of large high-rise post-Second World War housing developments, but since the Velvet Revolution of 1989 there has been rapid development of commercial sites such as car dealerships; there are also some areas of detached housing. There are a number of hotels in the district, some of them large establishments catering to the congress and package holiday trade.

== Notable buildings ==
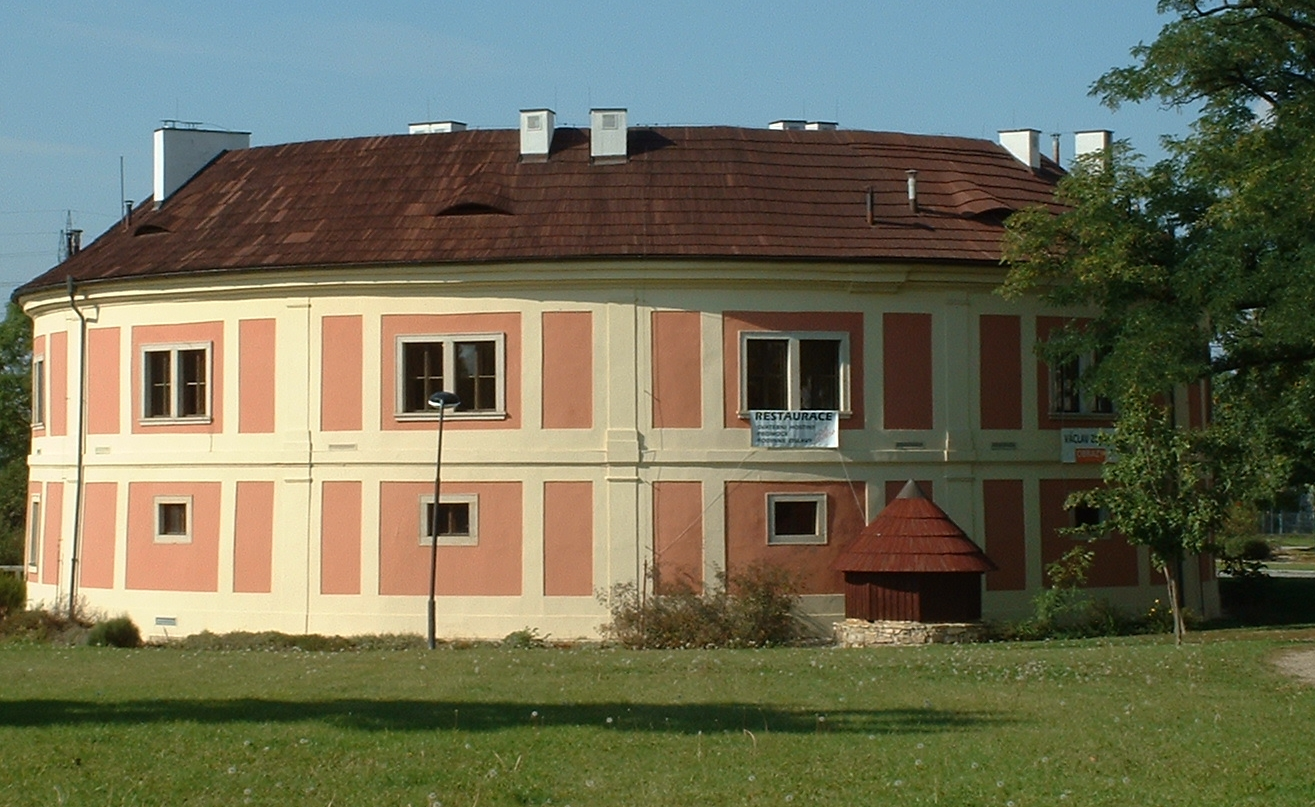
Rear view of Chodov fort

- the Chodovská vodní tvrz or Chodov fort, a round building with its origins in the 13th century (though heavily restored) which now serves as a cultural centre and includes a gallery and a small recital room.
- the new location (opened on 1 January 1999) of the National Archives, in a striking modern building
- Westfield Chodov, the Chodov Shopping Center – one of the biggest shopping malls in Prague and in the whole Czech Republic with more than 210 stores; located above the Chodov metro station.

== Demographics ==
Historical population

Year	Pop.	±%
1869	596	—
1880	621	+4.2%
1890	704	+13.4%
1900	801	+13.8%
1910	909	+13.5%

Year	Pop.	±%
1921	790	−13.1%
1930	1,795	+127.2%
1950	4,236	+136.0%
1961	4,513	+6.5%
1970	4,349	−3.6%

Year	Pop.	±%
1980	33,004	+658.9%
1991	60,522	+83.4%
2001	58,140	−3.9%
2011	54,535	−6.2%
2021	50,043	−8.2%

Source: Censuses
