= Line D (Prague Metro) =

Future Metro line in the Czech Republic

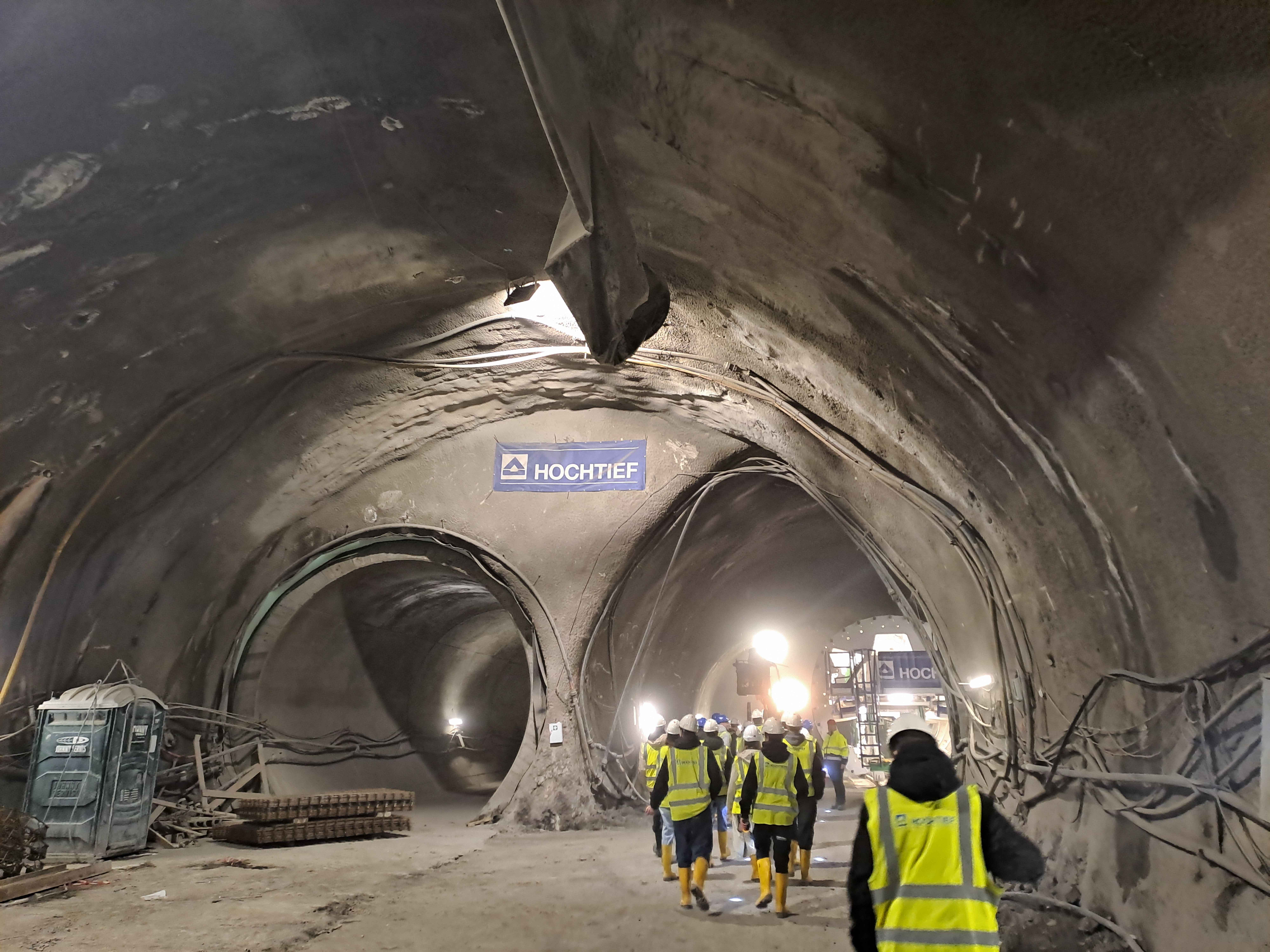
- Construction of Line D (2025)

Overview
- Owner: Prague Public Transit Company
- Locale: Prague, Czech Republic
- Stations: 10 (planned)

Service
- Type: Rapid transit
- System: Prague Metro

History
- Opened: 2032; 6 years' time (planned)

Technical
- Line length: 10.6 km (6.6 mi)
- Number of tracks: Double
- Character: Underground and Overground
- Track gauge: 1,435 mm (4 ft 8 1/2 in) standard gauge

Map of metro Line D

Line D (Czech: Linka D) is an under-construction line of the Prague Metro. The planned line will be 10.6 km (6.6 mi) long and have ten stations, running from Náměstí Míru to Depo Písnice. It will connect with Line A at Náměstí Míru and Line C at Pankrác.

Construction began in April 2022. The line is being built in stages, with the first section between Pankrác and Nové Dvory expected to open in the second half of 2032. Line D is planned to operate with fully automated driverless trains.

== History ==
Construction of Line D was originally expected to begin around 2010. In 2012, after the original plans were considered too expensive, the city examined a cheaper alternative that would have connected Line D directly with Line C at Pankrác. The Prague City Council approved the Line D project in October 2013. In July 2015, the city decided that the line would use automated driverless trains.

The planned route from Náměstí Míru to Depo Písnice is 10.6 km (6.6 mi) long and includes ten stations. The estimated cost rose from at least CZK 25 billion in the early planning stages to CZK 43 billion in 2018 and CZK 73 billion in 2020.

Construction began on 21 April 2022 with the section between Pankrác and Olbrachtova. Olbrachtova became the first station on the line to be fully excavated in 2025. Construction of the next section, from Olbrachtova to Nové Dvory, began in June 2026; it includes the stations Nádraží Krč, Nemocnice Krč and Nové Dvory.

The Pankrác–Nové Dvory section is expected to become the first part of Line D to enter passenger service, with opening planned for the second half of 2032. Later stages are planned to extend the line south to Depo Písnice and north from Pankrác to Náměstí Míru.

== Stations ==
- Náměstí Míru (transfer to Line A)
- Nusle (provisionally called Náměstí bratří Synků) (cs)
- Pankrác (transfer to Line C)
- Ryšánka (provisionally called Olbrachtova) (cs)
- Nádraží Krč (cs)
- Nemocnice Krč (cs)
- Nové Dvory
- Libuš (cs)
- Písnice (cs)
- Depo Písnice (cs)
