= Line C (Prague Metro) =

Metro line in Prague, Czech Republic

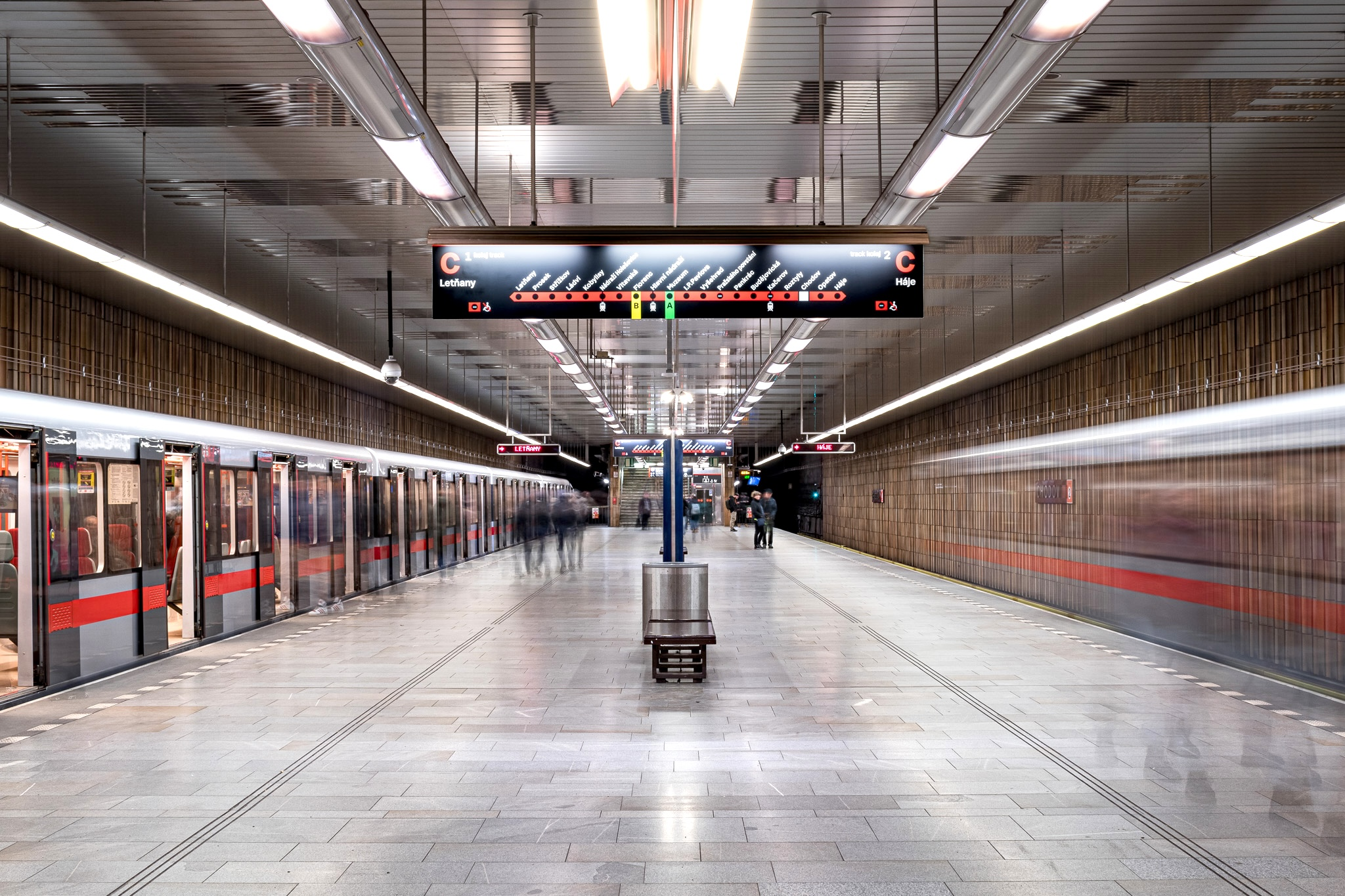
- Chodov station

Overview
- Owner: Prague Public Transit Company
- Locale: Prague, Czech Republic
- Stations: 20

Service
- Type: Rapid transit
- System: Prague Metro

History
- Opened: 9 May 1974; 52 years ago
- Last extension: 2008

Technical
- Line length: 22.4 km (13.9 mi)
- Number of tracks: Double
- Character: Underground
- Track gauge: 1,435 mm (4 ft 8 1/2 in) standard gauge

Line C (Czech: Linka C) is a line on the Prague Metro. It crosses the right-bank half of the city center in the north-south directions and turns to the east at both ends of the line. It is the system's oldest and most used line, being opened in 1974 and transporting roughly 26,900 persons per hour in the peak. The line is 22.41 kilometres (13.92 mi) long and includes 20 stations, journey from one end to the other taking approx. 35 min.

== History ==
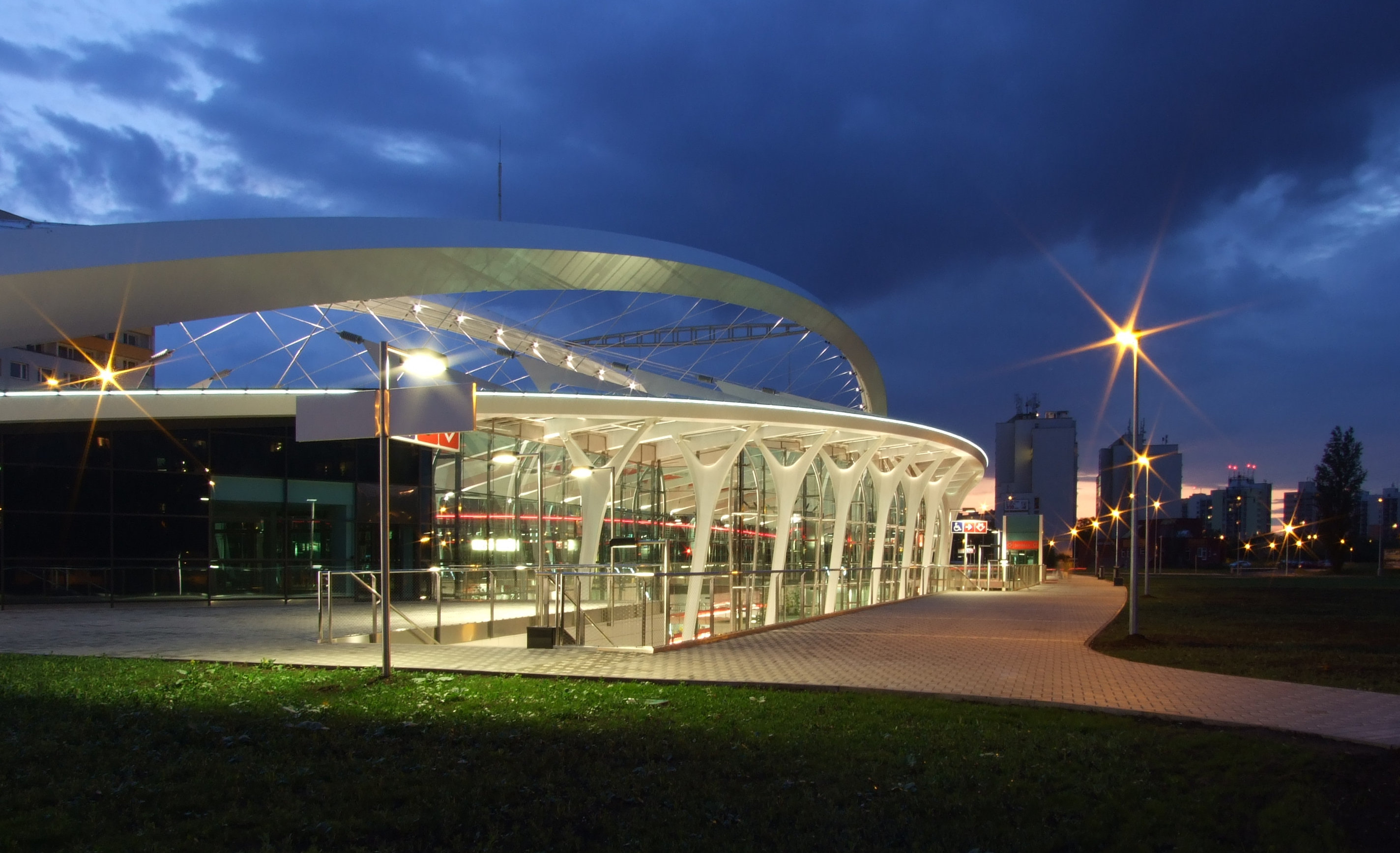
Exterior entrance to Střížkov station

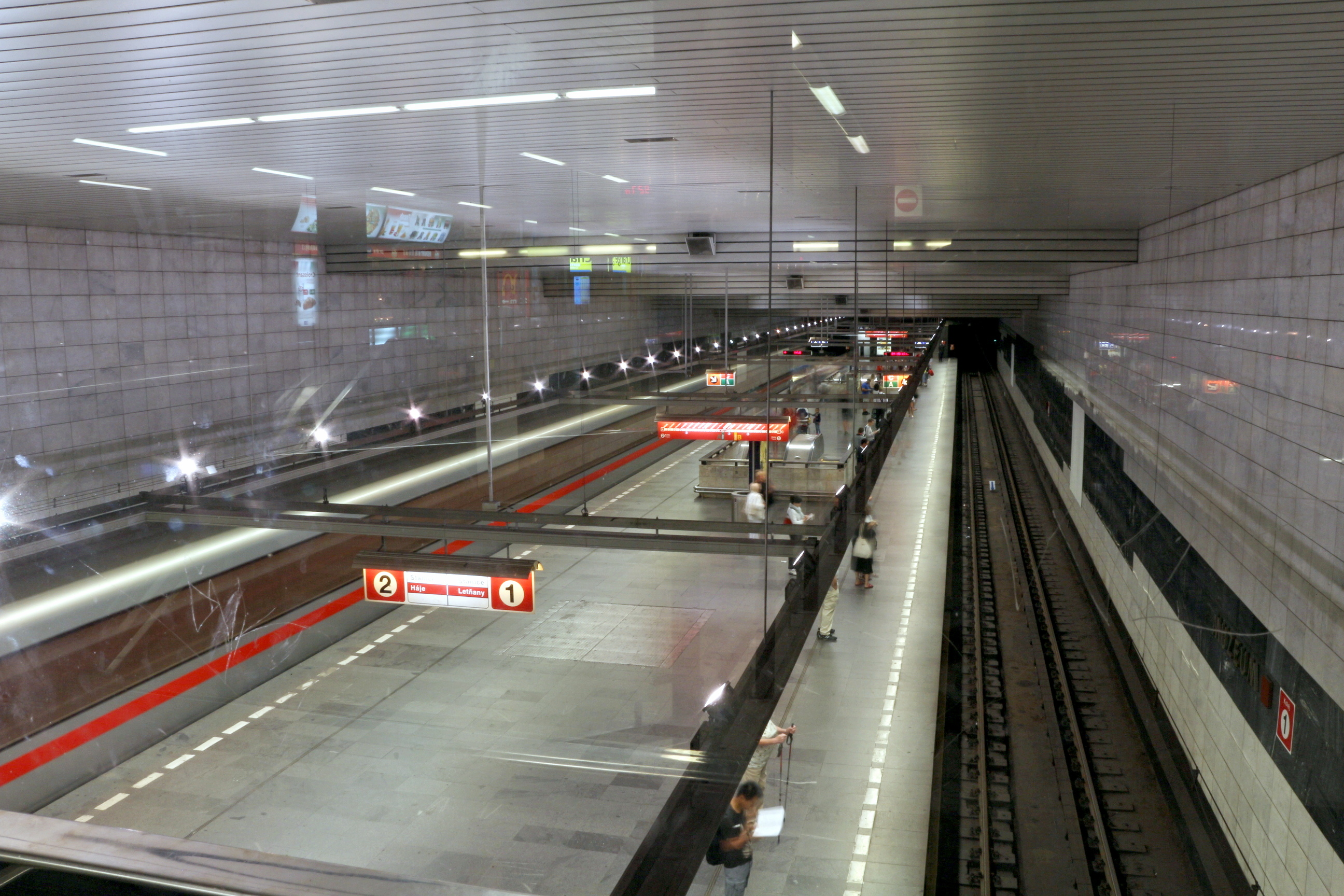
The line C platform at Muzeum

=== Segment I.C ===
Construction was started in 1966 on an underground rapid tram line. One year later, the project was changed to a metro line. This segment, leading from Florenc to Kačerov, was opened on 9 May 1974. It is 6.6 kilometres (4.1 mi) long and includes 9 stations and a train depot at Kačerov. It is mostly built using cut-and-cover technology, except for bored tunnels around the Pankrác station and crossing of the Nusle valley inside the Nusle Bridge. Between the Muzeum and Hlavní nádraží stations is the shortest distance in the system (ca. 400 m).

Interior of the stations on this segment is made mostly using marble blocks, the main exceptions being Vyšehrad with large glass windows and Budějovická with limestone blocks.

=== Segment II.C ===
In 1975 commenced the construction of the second segment, going from Kačerov to large housing estates in the southern parts of the city. It is 5.3 kilometres (3.3 mi) long and includes five stations. Interior decoration consists mostly of ceramic tiles, except the end station Háje, using limestone blocks and aluminium tiles.

=== Segment III.C ===
The third segment, connecting Holešovice district with the city center, was opened in 1984. It is 2.2 kilometres (1.4 mi) long and includes two stations. Its stations are decorated by ceramic tiles similar to the second segment, but here they are larger.

=== Segment IV.C ===
The fourth segment is the only one in the history of Prague metro, which has been divided into two construction segments

==== Segment IV.C1 ====
The segment IV.C1, opened in 2004, extends from Nádraží Holešovice to the then temporary terminus Ládví. It is 4.0 kilometres (2.5 mi) long and contains two stations. Construction of this segment, which began in 2000, is perhaps the most difficult in the history of the Metro. Unique technology was used in constructing the tunnel under the river Vltava: The concrete tunnel tubes were made in a dry dock on the shore, the riverbed was excavated and the tubes were then laid down into the pits. The tunnels were due to the elimination of the piston effect, which is unpleasant to passengers in the stations, built as double-track. Station Kobylisy is the first and as of 2008 only single-vaulted bored station in the prague metro. This segment holds several records in the Prague metro:

- Longest distance between two stations – Nádraží Holešovice and Kobylisy, 2,748 m
- Highest above-sea-level station – Ládví, 282 metres (925 ft)
- deepest station below surface on line C – Kobylisy, 31 metres (102 ft)
- Highest climb between two stations – Nádraží Holešovice and Kobylisy, 120 metres (390 ft)

==== Segment IV.C2 ====
After opening of the previous segment, the construction immediately continued in the direction of Prosek and Letňany. The construction lasted almost 4 years until it was opened on May 8, 2008. The segment from Ládví to Prosek is built using cut-and-cover methods, while the segment from Prosek to Letňany is mostly bored. It is 4.6 kilometres (2.9 mi) long and contains 3 stations.

=== Summary ===
Segment	Date opened	Length
Florenc-Kačerov	May 9, 1974	6.6 km
Kačerov-Háje	Nov 11, 1980	5.3 km
Florenc-Nádraží Holešovice	Nov 3, 1984	2.2 km
Nádraží Holešovice-Ládví	Jun 26, 2004	4.0 km
Ládví-Letňany	May 8, 2008	4.6 km
Total:	20 stations	22.7 km

== Rolling stock ==
- Ечс: 1974 - 1997
- 81-71: 1978 - 2003
- 81-71M: 1996 - 2005
- Siemens M1: 2001 - present

== Name changes ==
Station	Previous name(s)	Years
Florenc	Sokolovská	1974–1990
Vyšehrad	Gottwaldova	1974–1990
Pankrác	Mládežnická	1974–1990
Roztyly	Primátora Vacka	1980–1990
Chodov	Budovatelů	1980–1990
Opatov	Družby	1980–1990
Háje	Kosmonautů	1980–1990
Nádraží Holešovice	Fučíkova	1984–1990
