= Kačerov (Prague Metro) =

Prague metro station

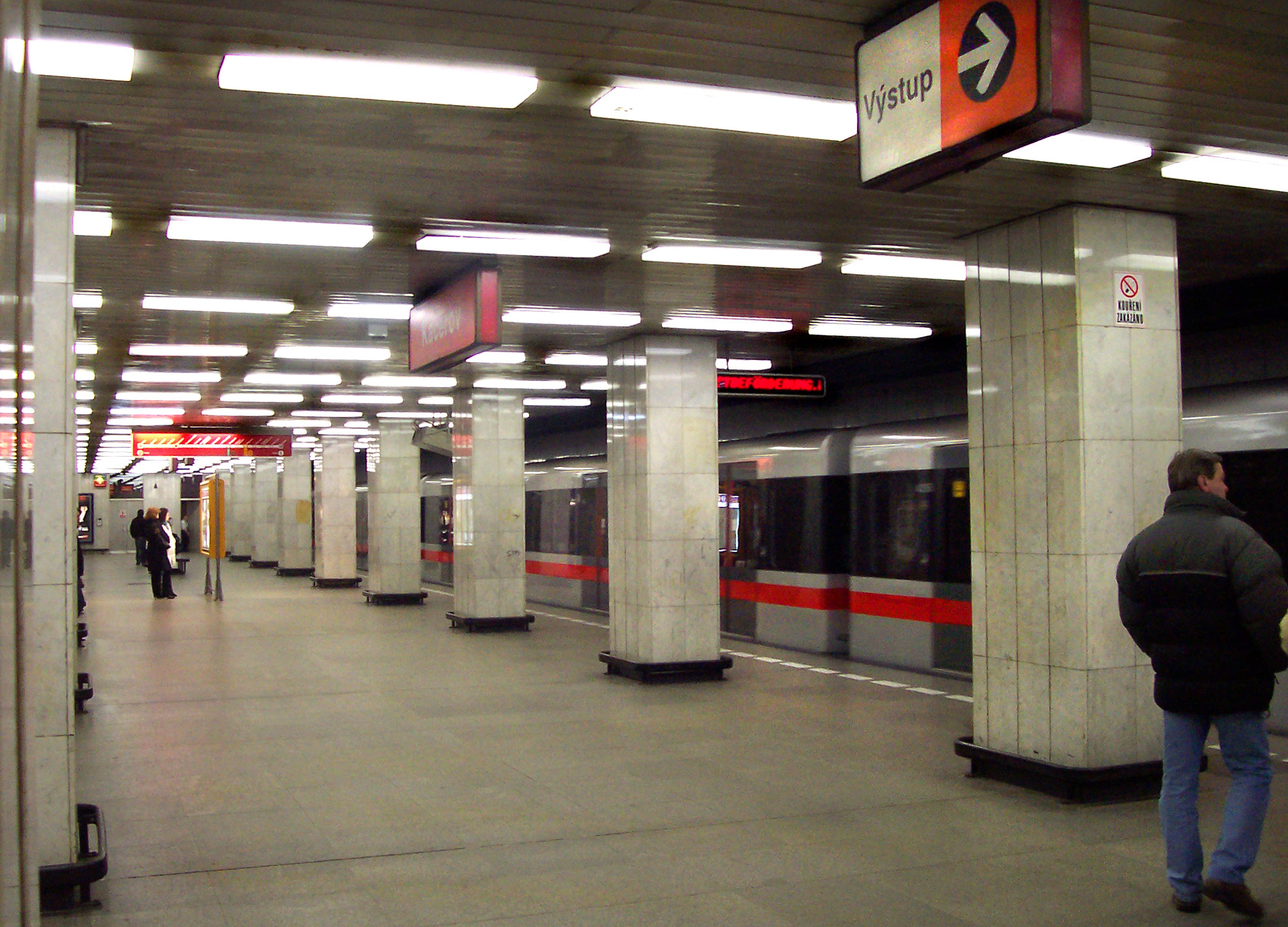
- Kačerov metro station

General information
- Location: Michelská; Prague 4 - Michle; Prague; Czech Republic
- Coordinates: 50.042°N 14.460°E
- System: Prague Metro
- Owner: Dopravní podnik hl. m. Prahy
- Line: C
- Platforms: Island platform
- Tracks: 2

Construction
- Structure type: Underground
- Platform levels: 1
- Cycle facilities: No

History
- Opened: 9 May 1974

Services
Preceding station	Prague Metro	Following station
Budějovická toward Letňany	Line C	Roztyly toward Háje
Location
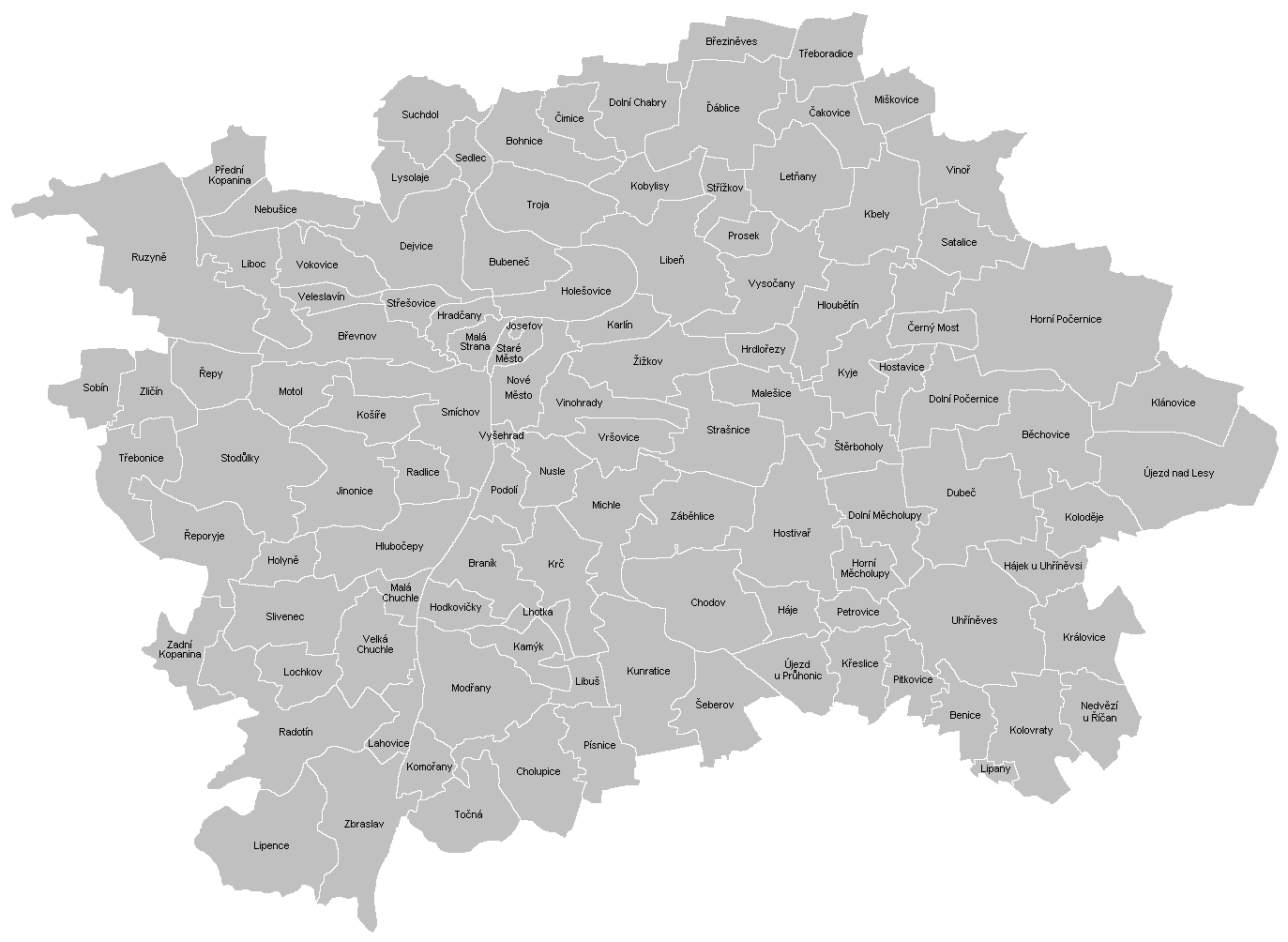
- Location within Prague Location within Greater Prague Location within Czech Republic

Kačerov (Czech pronunciation: [ˈkatʃɛrof]) is a Prague Metro station on Line C, located between Michle and Krč in Prague 4. It was opened on 9 May 1974 as the southern terminus of the first section of Prague Metro, between Sokolovská and Kačerov. On 7 November 1980, the line was extended to Kosmonautů (currently Háje).
