= Háje (Prague Metro) =

Prague metro station

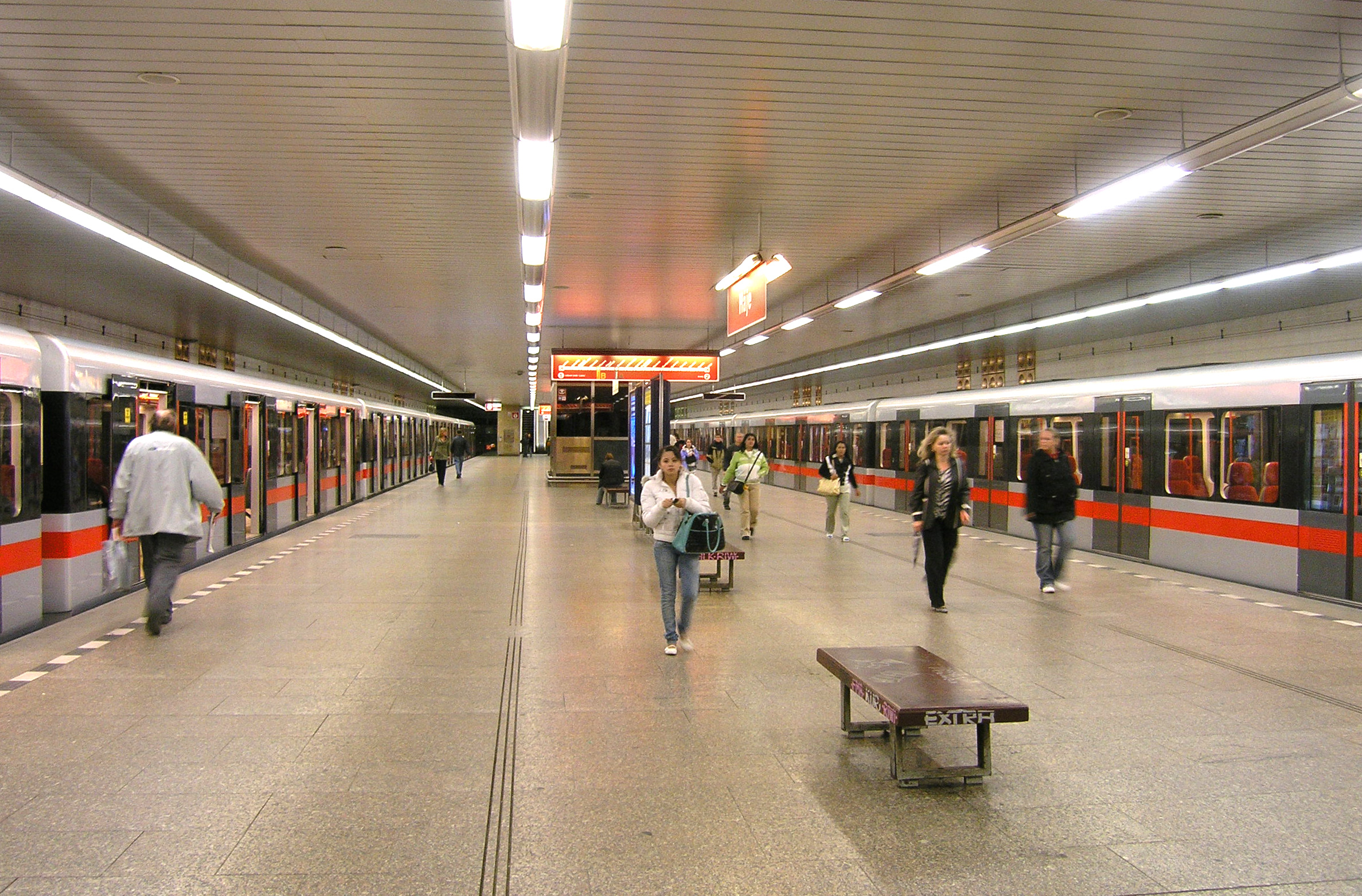
- Platform

General information
- Location: Háje; Prague 11; Prague; Czech Republic
- Coordinates: 50.031°N 14.527°E
- System: Prague Metro station
- Owner: Dopravní podnik hl. m. Prahy
- Line: C
- Platforms: Island platform
- Tracks: 2

Construction
- Structure type: Underground
- Platform levels: 1
- Cycle facilities: No
- Accessible: Yes

History
- Opened: 7 November 1980

Services
Preceding station	Prague Metro	Following station
Opatov toward Letňany	Line C	Terminus
Location
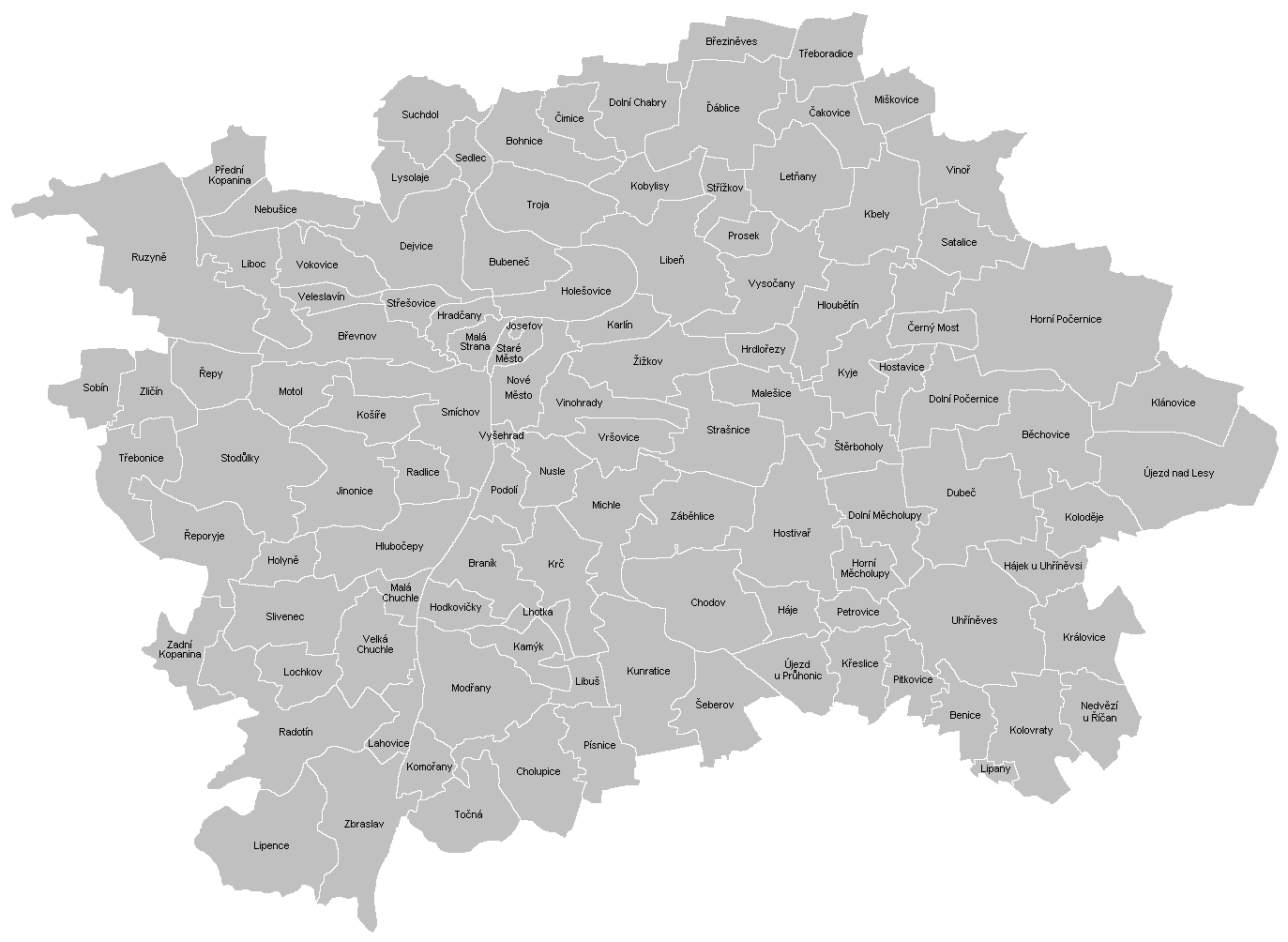
- Location within Prague Location within Greater Prague Location within Czech Republic

Háje (Czech pronunciation: [ˈɦaːjɛ]) is a Prague Metro station and the terminus of Line C. It is named after a local neighborhood, whose name in English literally means groves. Háje station, along with the two stations preceding it, serve Jižní Město, the largest housing estate in the Czech Republic.

The station was opened on 7 November 1980 as the southern terminus of the extension from Kačerov and was formerly known as Kosmonautů (meaning [station of] the cosmonauts) until 1990.
