= Odolen Kodym =

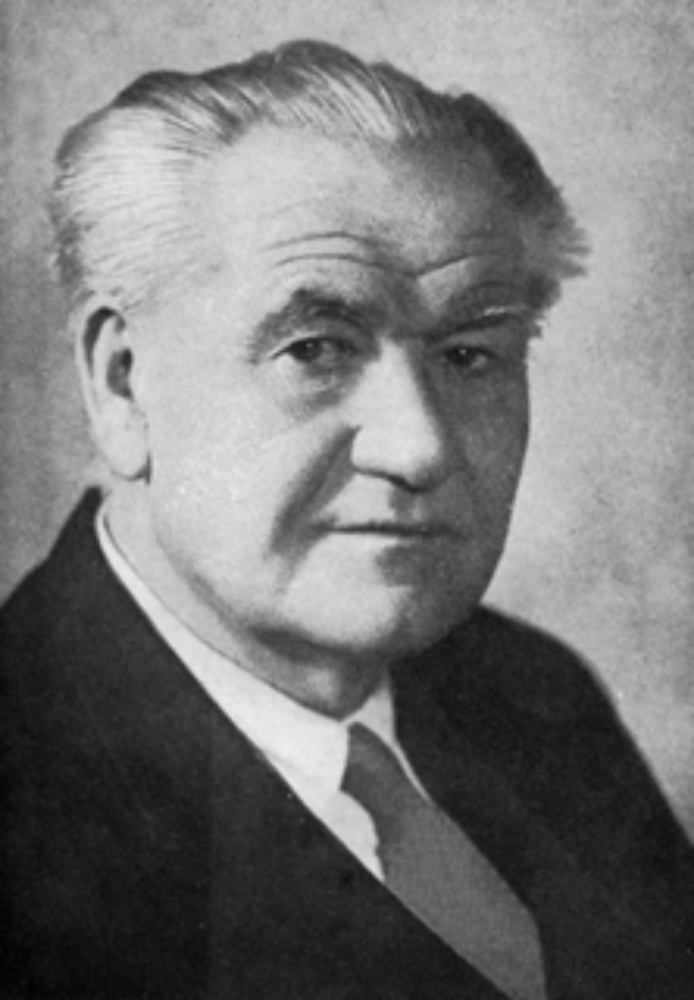
Kodym in 1955

Odolen Kodym (14 April 1898 – 3 July 1963) was a Czech geologist and mineralogist. He studied the geology of the Prague region, particularly the Barrandian region.

== Life and career ==
Kodym was born in Prague, the son of medical doctor Odolen Kodym. He went to the Jirásek Gymnasium and then the Real School after which he studied at the Charles University. He also attended lectures in geology by Cyril Purkyně at the Technical University. He studied the Barrandian region for his doctorate and then became an assistant to Purkyně in 1919. He then worked with the State Geological Institute and at the same time with the Technical University. In 1925 he became an associate professor of geology at the University of civil engineering. Kodym also travelled around Bohemia and Slovakia and was involved in mapping the geology. His work was applied to search for oil and the construction of dams and railway lines. He produced a geological map of the Prokop Valley in 1918, and of the Barrandian between 1922 and 1925. He published several textbooks on geology for secondary schools while serving as a commissioner for teacher exams at secondary schools from 1939. He became a member of the Czech National Research Council in 1934 and in 1956 he headed the Czechoslovak Society for Mineralogy and Geology. He was the second professor of geology at Charles University from 1946. He received a doctoral title in 1956. His students included Blanka Pacltová.

His son, also Odolen Kodym, took an interest in entomology and the beetle Cerambyx kodymi is named after him.
