= Ferdinand Leffler =

Czech designer and author (born 1978)

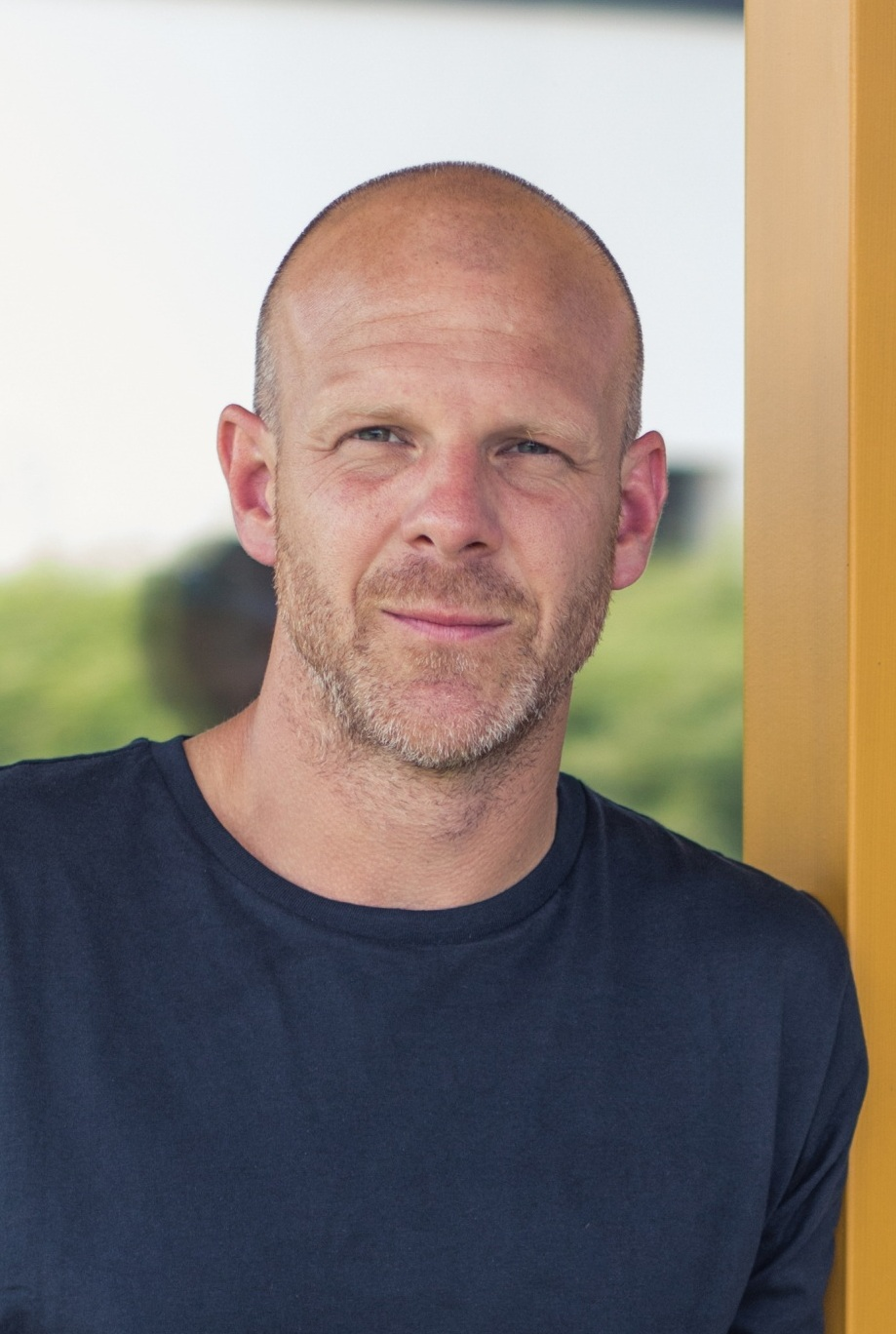
- Leffler in 2018
- Born: 12 December 1978 (age 47); Kadaň, Czechoslovakia
- Education: Czech University of Life Sciences Prague
- Occupation: garden designer
- Television: Ferdinand's Gardens (Czech TV)

Ferdinand Leffler (born 12 December 1978) is a Czech garden and landscape designer. He is the founder of Flera landscape architecture studio. His projects have won many awards and can be found all over the world. In addition to garden design, he promotes garden architecture. He was a host and a co-author of the TV show Ferdinandovy zahrady on Czech Television channel, he has published books Green Rooms and Live in Your Garden, he regularly creates video content on Flera TV YouTube channel, organizes seminars as a part of Flera Academy project and in spring 2021 he launched online course "Live in Your Garden" in which he teaches how to plan a garden.

== Life and career ==
Leffler was born on born 12 December 1978 in Kadaň. He graduated in Landscape Planning and Garden Engineering from the Czech University of Life Sciences Prague. In 2009, he founded Flera landscape studio, in which he collaborates with more than 30 landscape architects. Together they form projects in the private and public space in the largest landscape architecture studio in Central Europe. You can also find his work overseas – in Canada, Costa Rica and Zanzibar in Africa. Many of his projects have won numerous awards, such as Garden of the Year and TOP Destination in the Czech Republic 2017.

In 2017, he acted as co-author and host on the Czech Television TV show Ferdinandovy zahrady ("Ferdinand's Gardens"). The TV show ran for two series with a total of 16 episodes. The individual episodes deal with different types of gardens, from a small urban garden to a large rural one. The TV show received positive audience feedback and was the impetus for the creation of the Flera TV YouTube channel. More than 40 educational and inspirational videos have been made there since the launch of the channel.

== Projects ==
=== Czech Republic ===
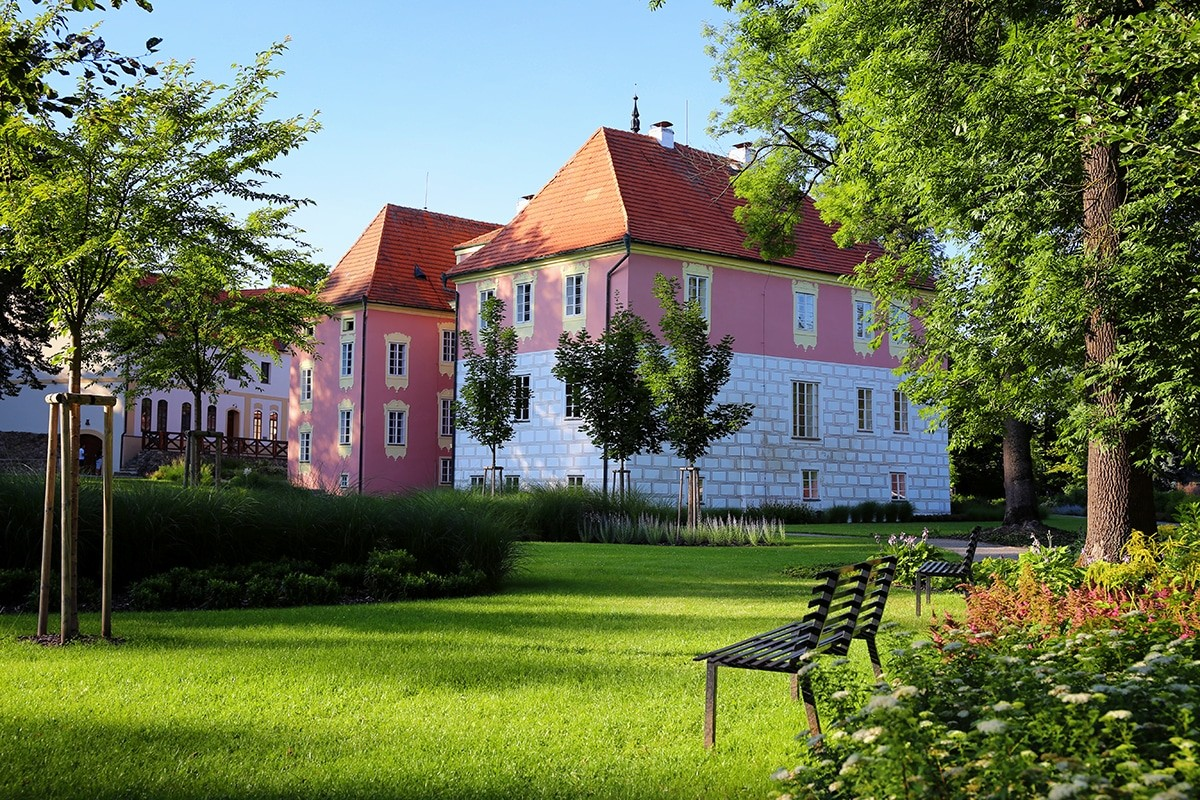
Mitrowitz Castle

- Mitrowitz Castle, Koloděje nad Lužnicí (2015) - authors: Ferdinand Leffler, Anna Chomjaková
- Castle Park in Žďár nad Sázavou (2015-2017) - authors: Ferdinand Leffler, Martina Imramovská, Jana Pyšková in collaboration with Flera studio
- Vila Na Petřinách, Prague 6 (2016) - authors: Ferdinand Leffler, Martina Imramovská, Markéta Hadačová in cooperation with Flera studio - Real Estate Project of the Year 2020 Award - Best of Realty 2020
- Barrandovská zahrada (2016) - authors: Ferdinand Leffler, Martina Sarvašová, Markéta Šindlarová, Lukáš Rábek, Kasia Dorda in collaboration with Flera studio
- Project Sakura, Prague (2017) - authors: Ferdinand Leffler, Markéta Šindlarová, Kasia Dorda and Martina Imramovská in collaboration with Flera studio
- Troja Chateau (2017) - authors: Ferdinand Leffler, Tomáš Sklenář, Jitka Ulwerová, Kasia Dorda in collaboration with Flera studio
- Pentagon Park for Škoda Auto, Mladá Boleslav (2018) - authors: Ferdinand Leffler and Lenka Kožíšková in cooperation with Flera studio
- Urban conception of the city of Harrachov (2018) authors: Ferdinand Leffler, Helena Lišková, Jitka Ulwerová in cooperation with Flera studio
- Zahálka Modřany, Riverpark Modřany (2018-2021) - authors: Ferdinand Leffler, Tomáš Sklenář, Lenka Kožíšková in collaboration with Flera studio
- The winning design for the renewal of the Žižkovo náměstí park (2018-2021) - authors: Ferdinand Leffler, Tomáš Sklenář, Lenka Kožíšková, Katarína Gloneková in cooperation with Flera studio

=== Other countries ===
- Hotel complex Zuri, Zanzibar (2014-2017) - authors: Ferdinand Leffler and Jana Pyšková in collaboration with Flera studio
- Art Villa, Costa Rica (2017) - authors: Ferdinand Leffler and Anna Chomjaková in collaboration with Flera studio
- Private Garden in Canada (2016) - authors: Ferdinand Leffler, Anna Chomjaková and Lukáš Rábek in collaboration with Flera studio
- Resort Veerhoeve, The Netherlands (2018) - authors: Ferdinand Leffler and Lenka Kožíšková in collaboration with Flera studio

== Books ==
Together with Tereza Frcalová, he wrote the book Live in Your Garden (2017), which describes a modern approach to garden planning. Two years later, the book Green Rooms (2019) followed, in which they compared individual parts of the garden in terms of their functions to the rooms in the house.

== Awards ==
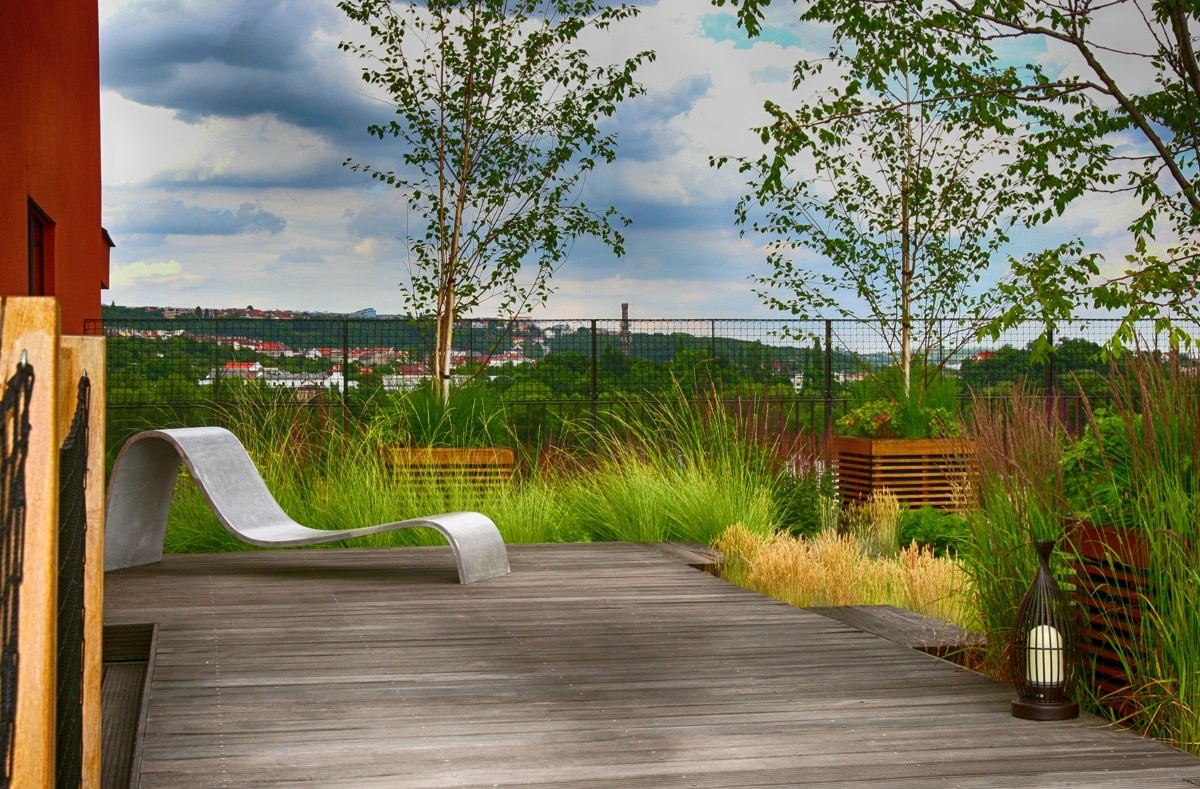
Garden of the Year 2014

- Garden of the Year 2014
- Garden of the Year 2014; 1st place: Roof private garden in Prague - Holešovice
- Garden of the Year 2016; 2nd place: Private Garden with Player, Olomouc
- Garden of the Year 2017; 3rd place: Garden of three tasks, Říčany
- Garden of the year 2022, 3rd place, Private family garden at Stará Lípa
- Public anonymous landscape - architectural competition Renovation of Janko Kráľ Park in Trnava; 3rd place; 2017
- TOP Destinations in the Czech Republic 2017, category Phoenix, private investor, Chateau Mitrowicz
- Sakura, REALISM development group, nominated for the final shortlist of the WAN Awards 2017, in the Future Projects Residential category. Nomination for the final shortlist of the World Architecture Festival, category Residential - Future Projects
- Inhabited garden, private investor, Swimming pool of 2019, category Bio-pool
- Garden full of joy, private investor, Swimming pool of 2019, category Other
- Barrandovská zahrada, Small-scale residential projects - 1st place, developer: T. E group, competition: Best of Realty 2019
- Vila Na Petřinách, The best project in the Czech Republic, absolute winner, developer: All New Development, competition: Best of Realty 2020

== Work style ==
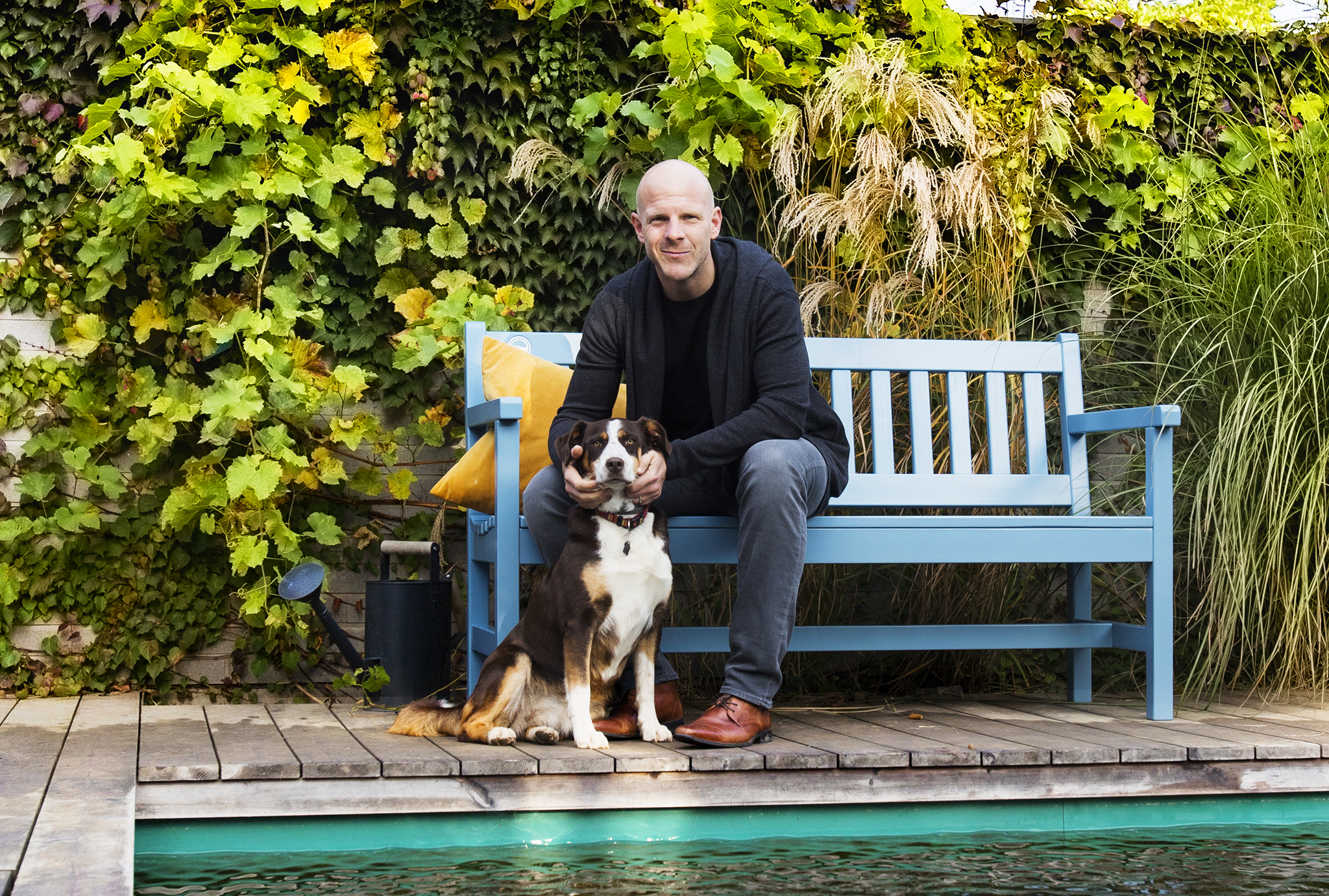
Leffler in 2017

While studying at university, he spent a year in the United States, traveling and pursuing various professions. He attended several lectures on architecture in Boston and worked in garden-architectural studios in California. Thanks to this experience, he began to perceive gardens more freely than according to the traditional European approach. American garden architecture does not have such a connection to history and can afford more experiments with space and material. Freedom in the creation of American gardens allows him to create natural projects without reference to the convulsive shapes of historic gardens.

He is interested in the needs of the people who will live in the garden before the actual designing itself. He does not create gardens that are just meant to be admired by people passing by, but gardens that pull their owners out of their house and make them enjoy the environment of the garden just as that of the living room. Gardens must entertain their owner. He considers understanding space very important. This allows him to work with the garden in such a way as to fulfill its potential.

== Gallery ==
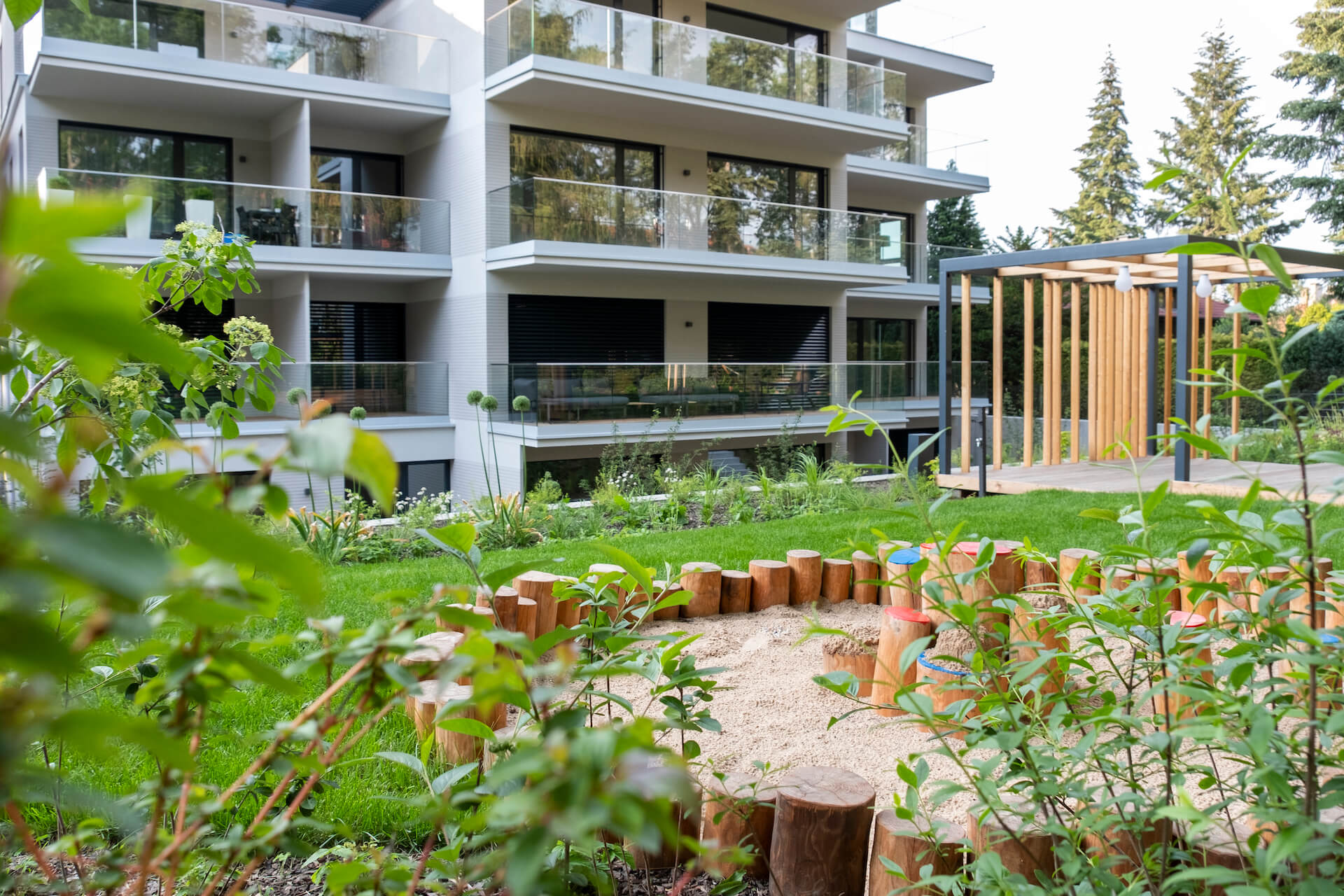
Villa Na Petřinách

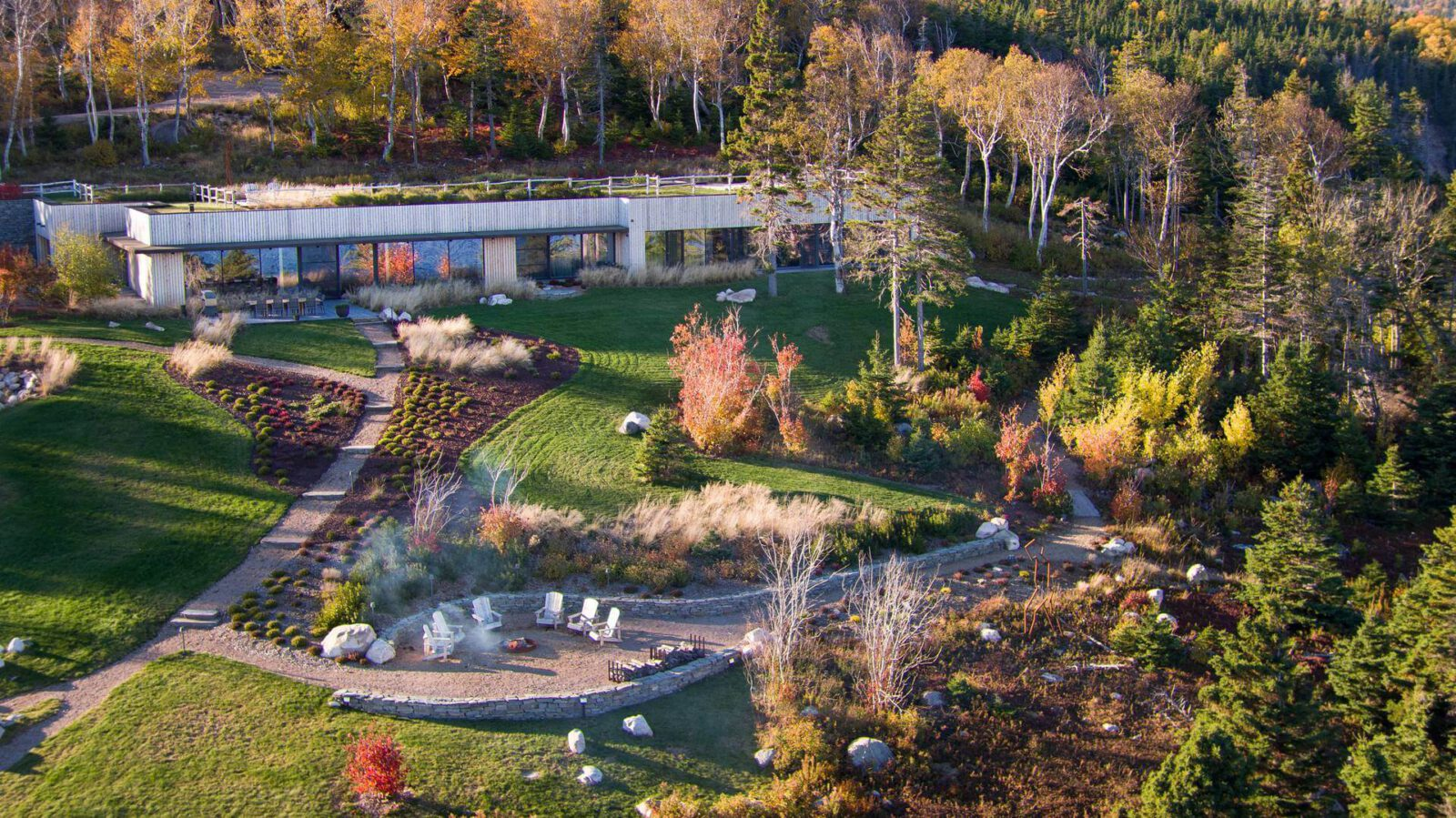
Private garden by the Atlantic Ocean

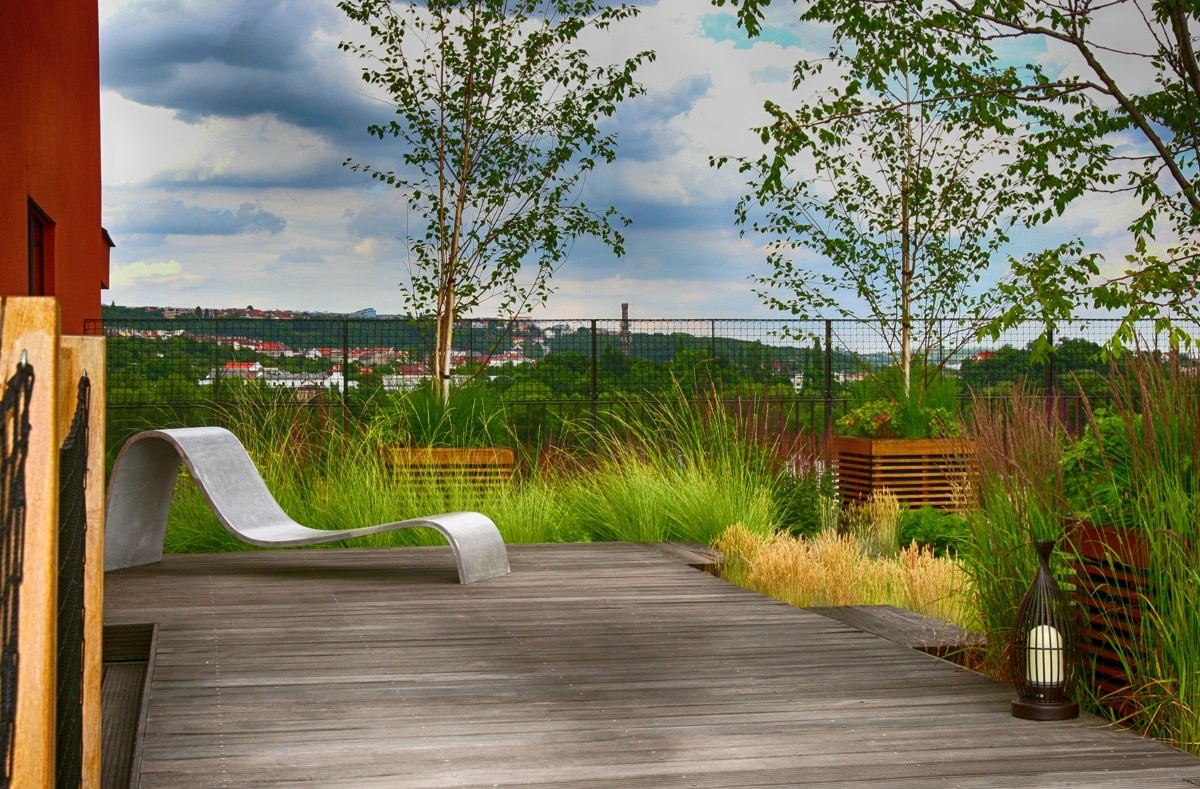
Garden along the Vltava River (Garden of the Year 2014)

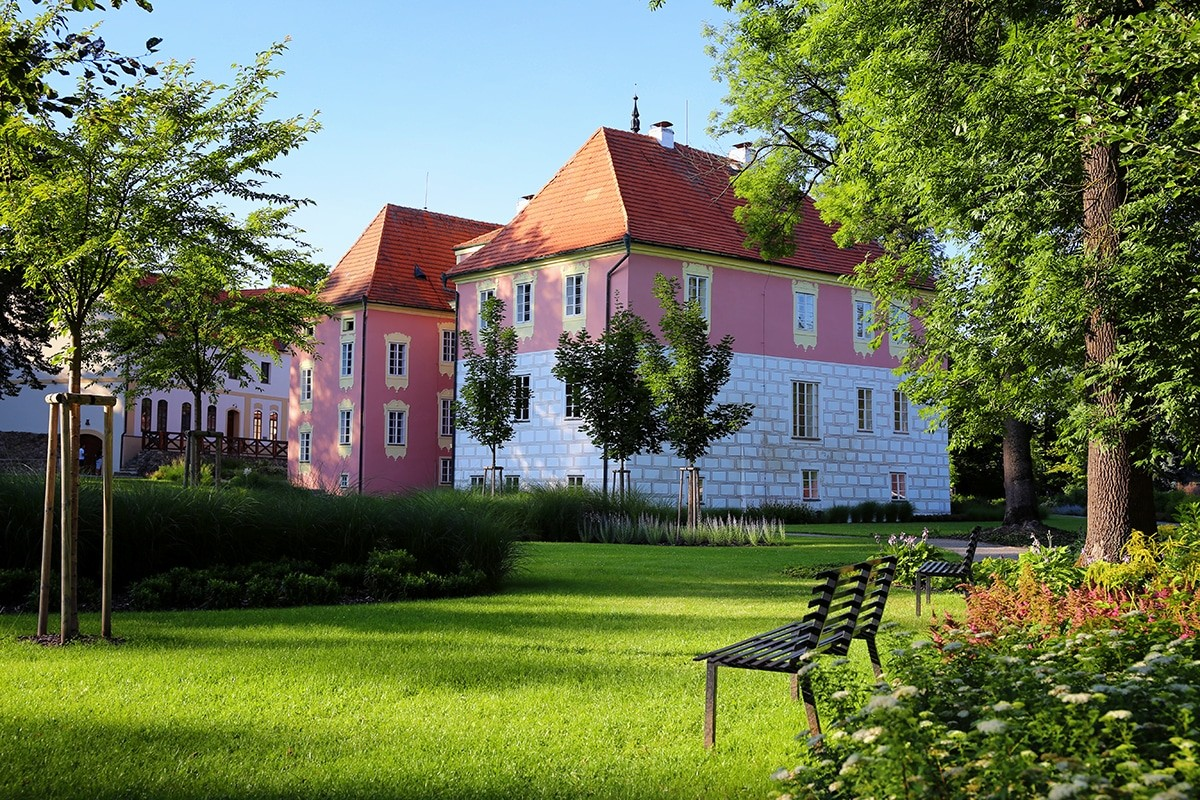
Mitrowitz Castle garden
