= Prague-Řeporyje =

Praha-Řeporyje
- Municipal District of Prague
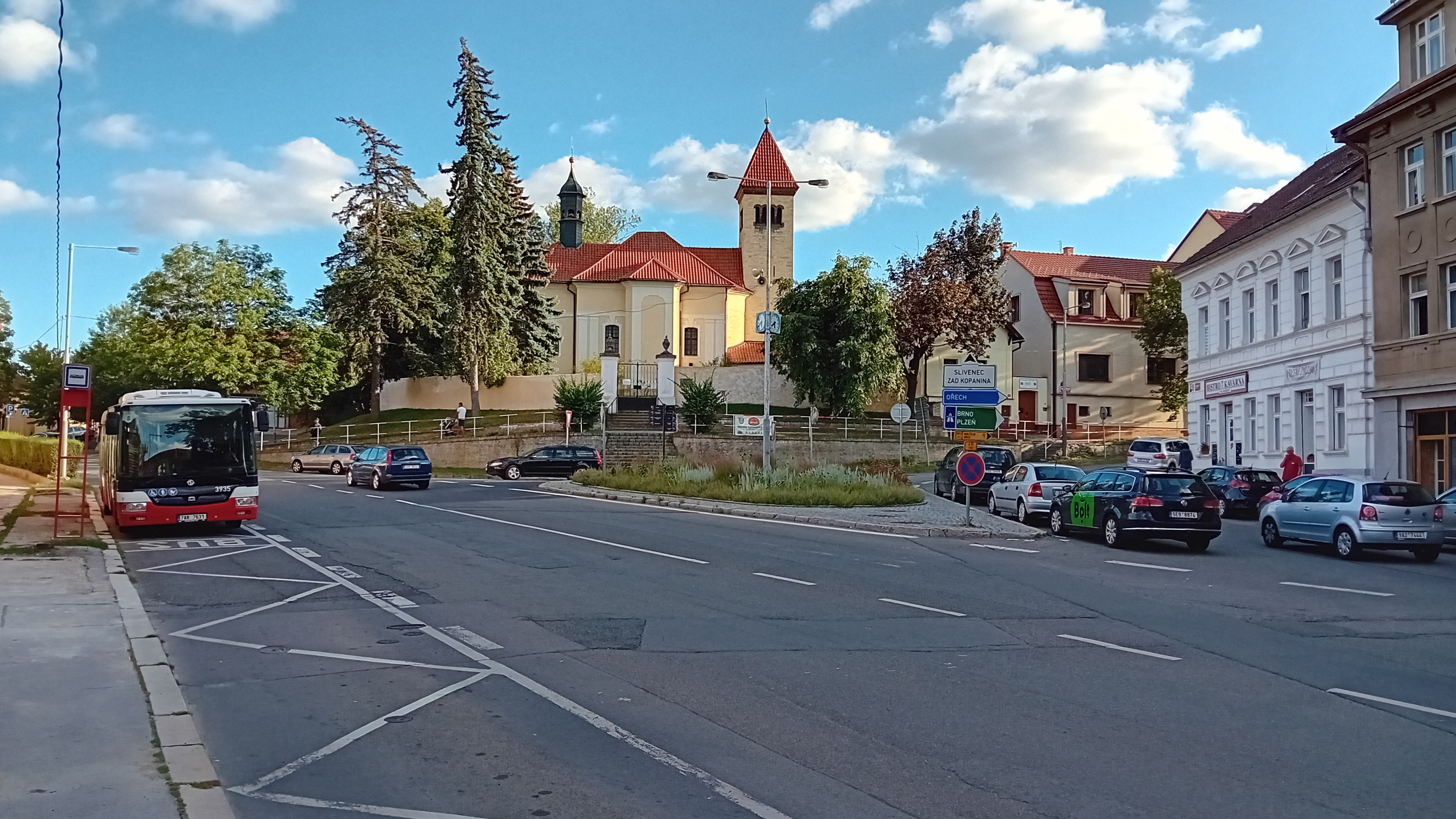
- Square in Prague-Řeporyje

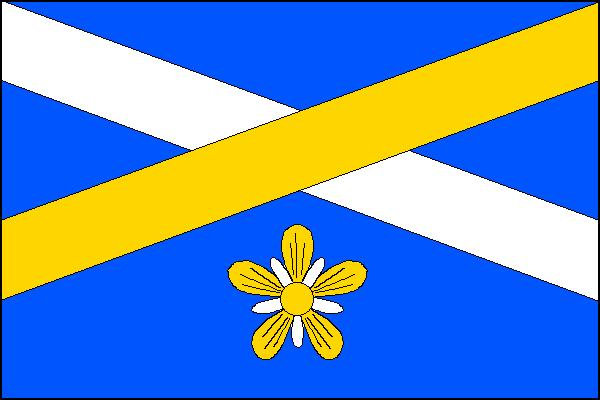
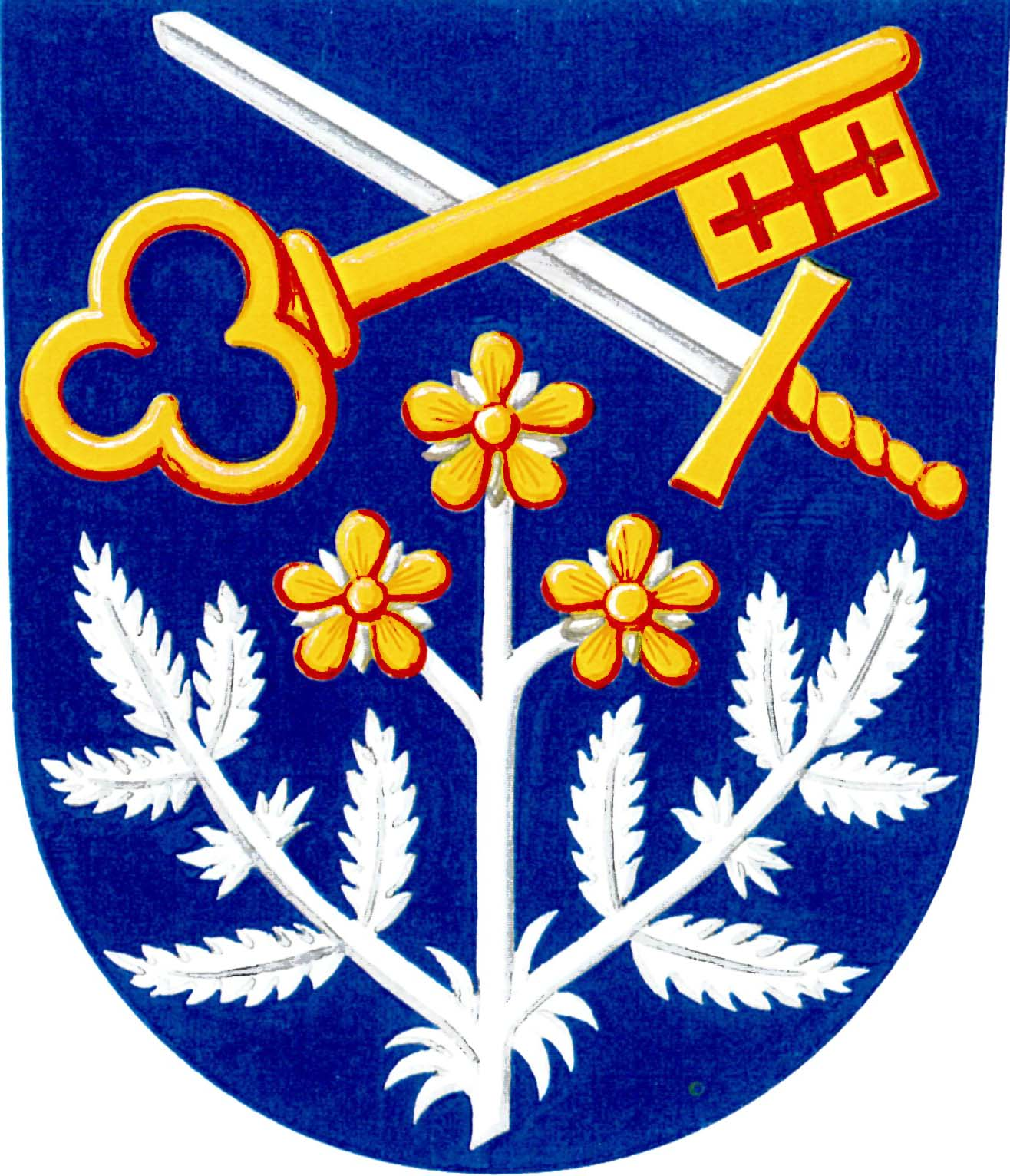
- Flag Coat of arms

- Location of Prague-Řeporyje in Prague
- Coordinates: 50.03306°N 14.31167°E
- Country: Czech Republic
- Region: Prague
- Administrative district: Prague 13
- Municipal district: Prague 5

Area
  - Total: 9.87 km^{2} (3.81 sq mi)

Population (2021)
  - Total: 6,075
  - Density: 616/km^{2} (1,590/sq mi)
- Time zone: UTC+1 (CET)
  - Summer (DST): UTC+2 (CEST)
- Postal code: 155 00

Prague-Řeporyje is a district in Prague, Czech Republic. It is situated in the eastern part of the city, in the administrative district Prague 13. The cadastral area Řeporyje is part of this district.
