= Řeporyje =

- Cadastral area of Prague
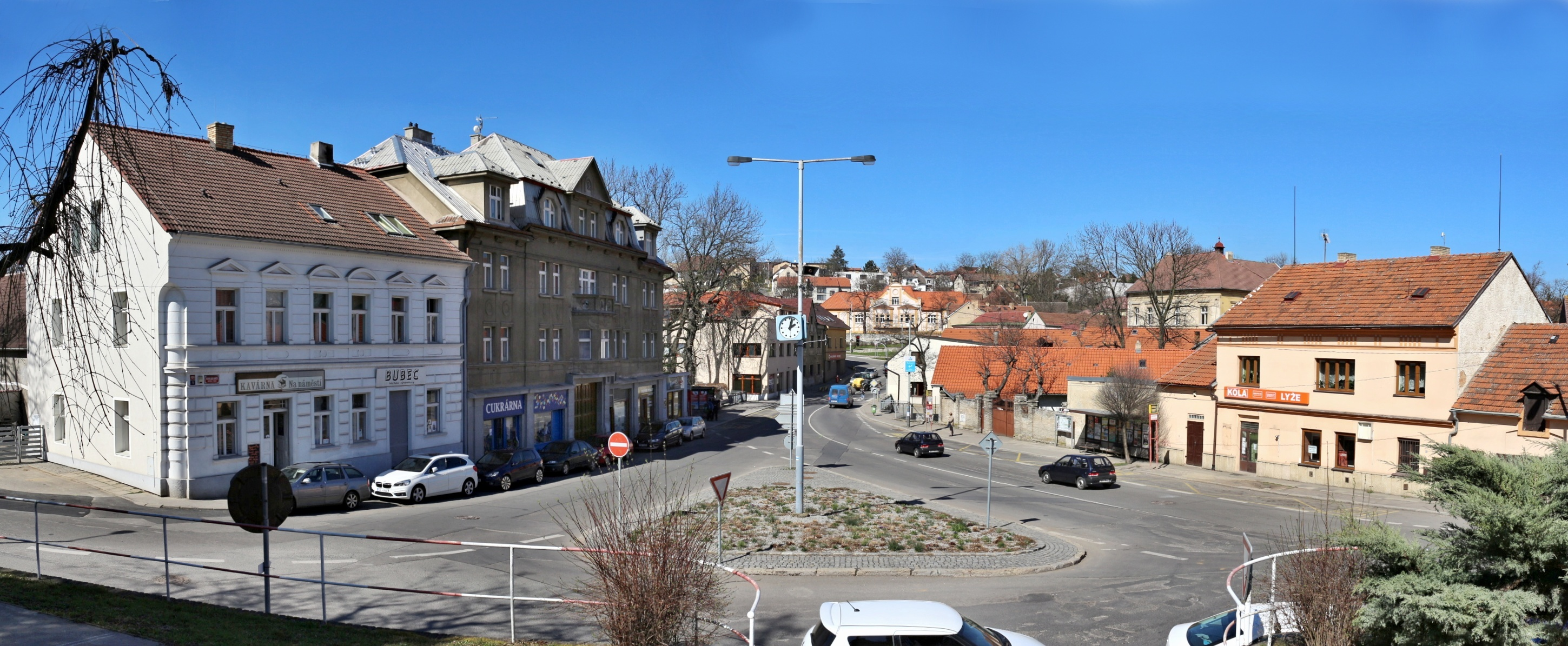
- Řeporyje town square

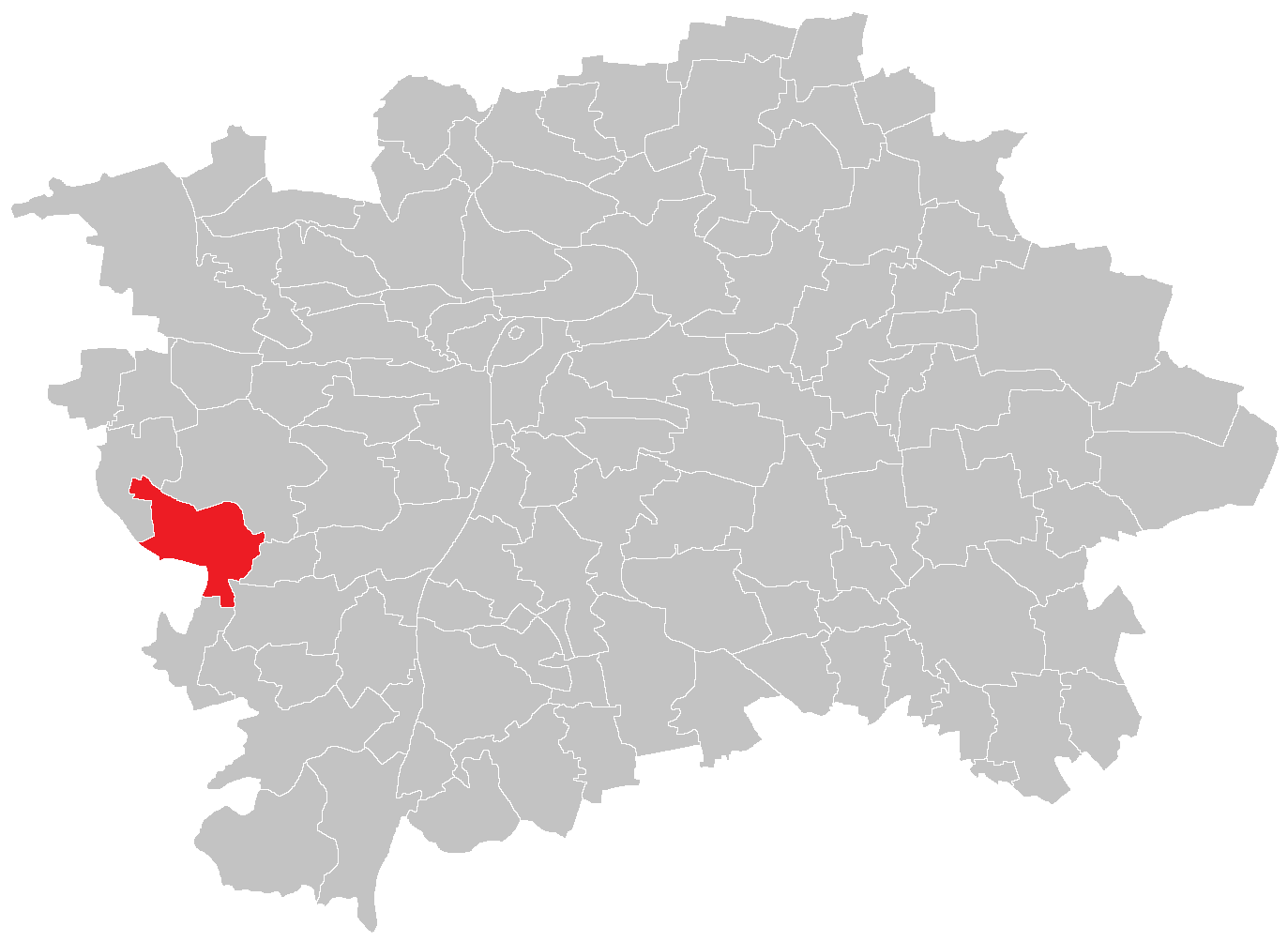
- Location of Řeporyje in Prague
- Coordinates: 50°1′56″N 14°18′45″E
- Country: Czech Republic
- Region: Prague
- District: Prague 13, Prague-Řeporyje

Area
  - Total: 5.66 km^{2} (2.19 sq mi)

Population (2021)
  - Total: 4,729
  - Density: 836/km^{2} (2,160/sq mi)
- Time zone: UTC+1 (CET)
  - Summer (DST): UTC+2 (CEST)
- Postal code: 155 00

Řeporyje is a cadastral area of Prague. Most of it belongs to the municipal district of Prague-Řeporyje, the rest belonging to Prague 13. Řeporyje became part of Prague in 1974, before which it was recorded as a market town.

The district is situated on Dalejský potok and borders Prokopské údolí to the east. The western part of Řeporyje is an industrial area, marked by the visually prominent silo belonging to Soufflet Agro a.s. The district is served by Praha-Řeporyje railway station, a passing point on the Praha – Rudná – Beroun railway line.

== Demographics ==
Historical population

| Year | Pop. | ±% |
|---|---|---|
| 1869 | 525 | — |
| 1880 | 682 | +29.9% |
| 1890 | 899 | +31.8% |
| 1900 | 1,411 | +57.0% |
| 1910 | 1,823 | +29.2% |
| 1921 | 1,880 | +3.1% |
| 1930 | 2,816 | +49.8% |
| 1950 | 2,949 | +4.7% |

| Year | Pop. | ±% |
|---|---|---|
| 1961 | 2,942 | −0.2% |
| 1970 | 2,399 | −18.5% |
| 1980 | 2,559 | +6.7% |
| 1991 | 2,122 | −17.1% |
| 2001 | 2,174 | +2.5% |
| 2011 | 3,727 | +71.4% |
| 2021 | 4,729 | +26.9% |

Source: Censuses

== Global stratigraphic boundary ==
Řeporyje is home of a global stratigraphic boundary for the Silurian. The base boundary for the Přídolí epoch and stage is located in a quarry southwest of Řeporyje (50.0277°N 14.3249°E).

== Gallery ==
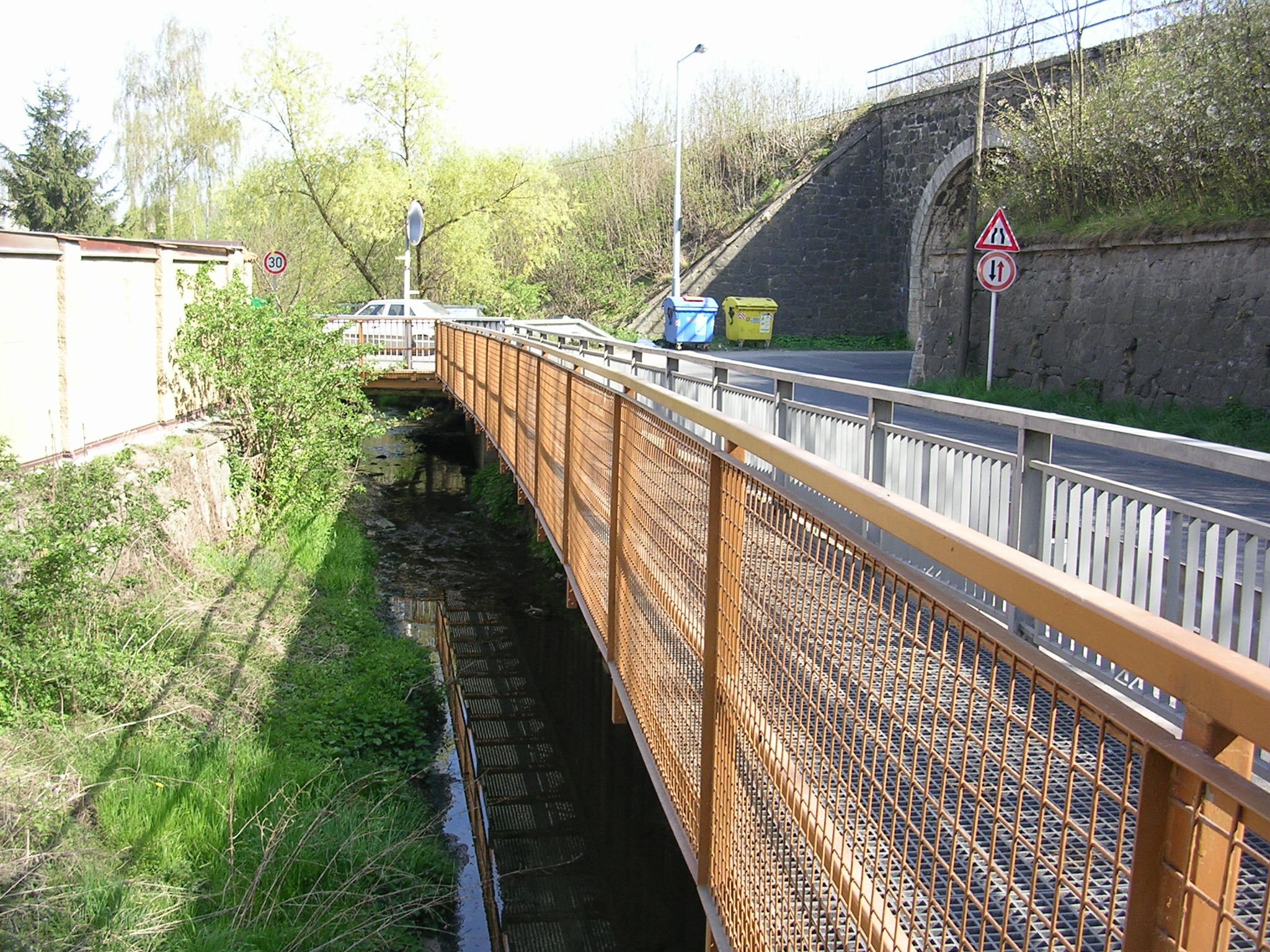
Viaduct over Dalejský potok

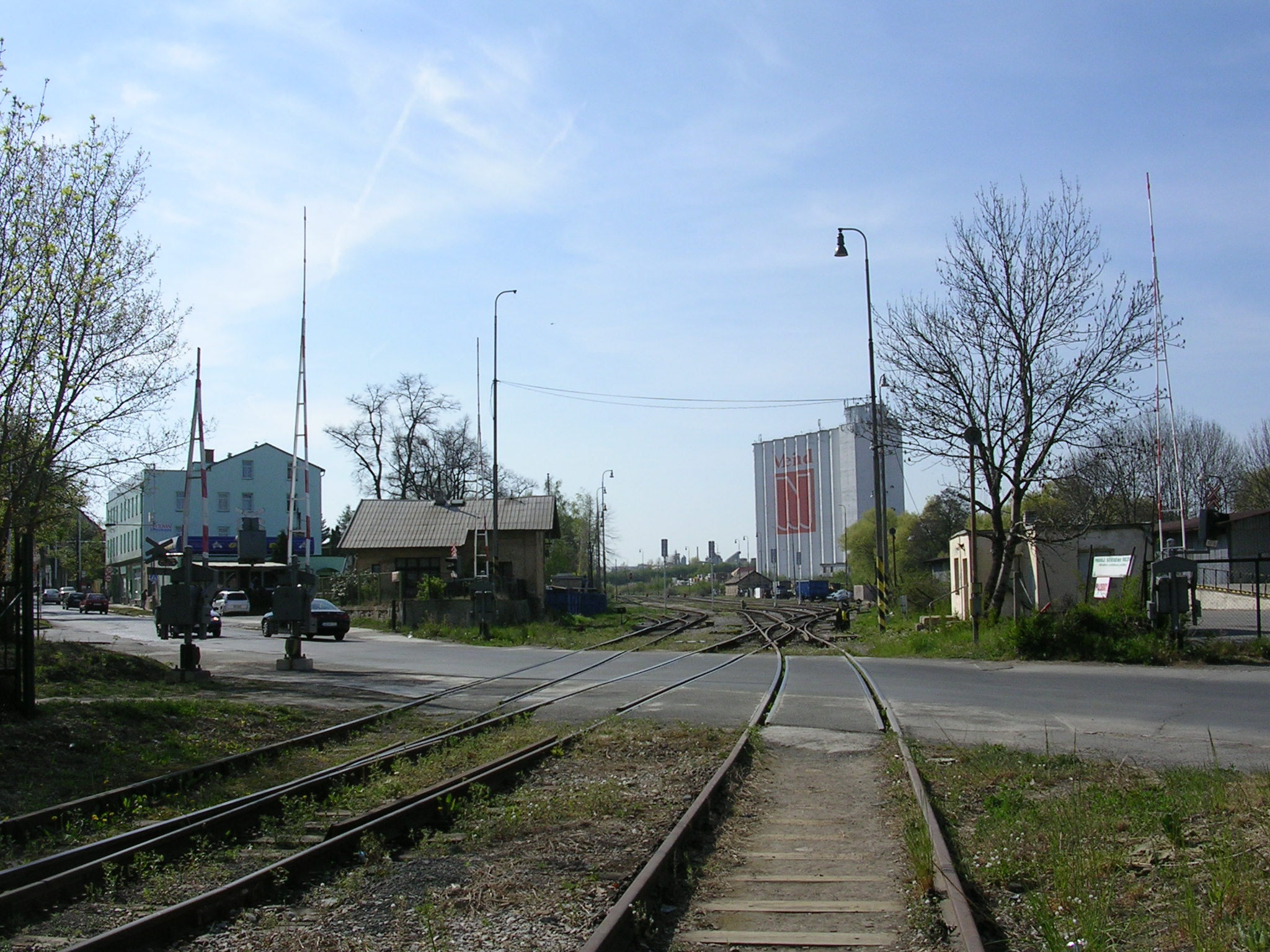
The passing loop before Praha-Řeporyje station

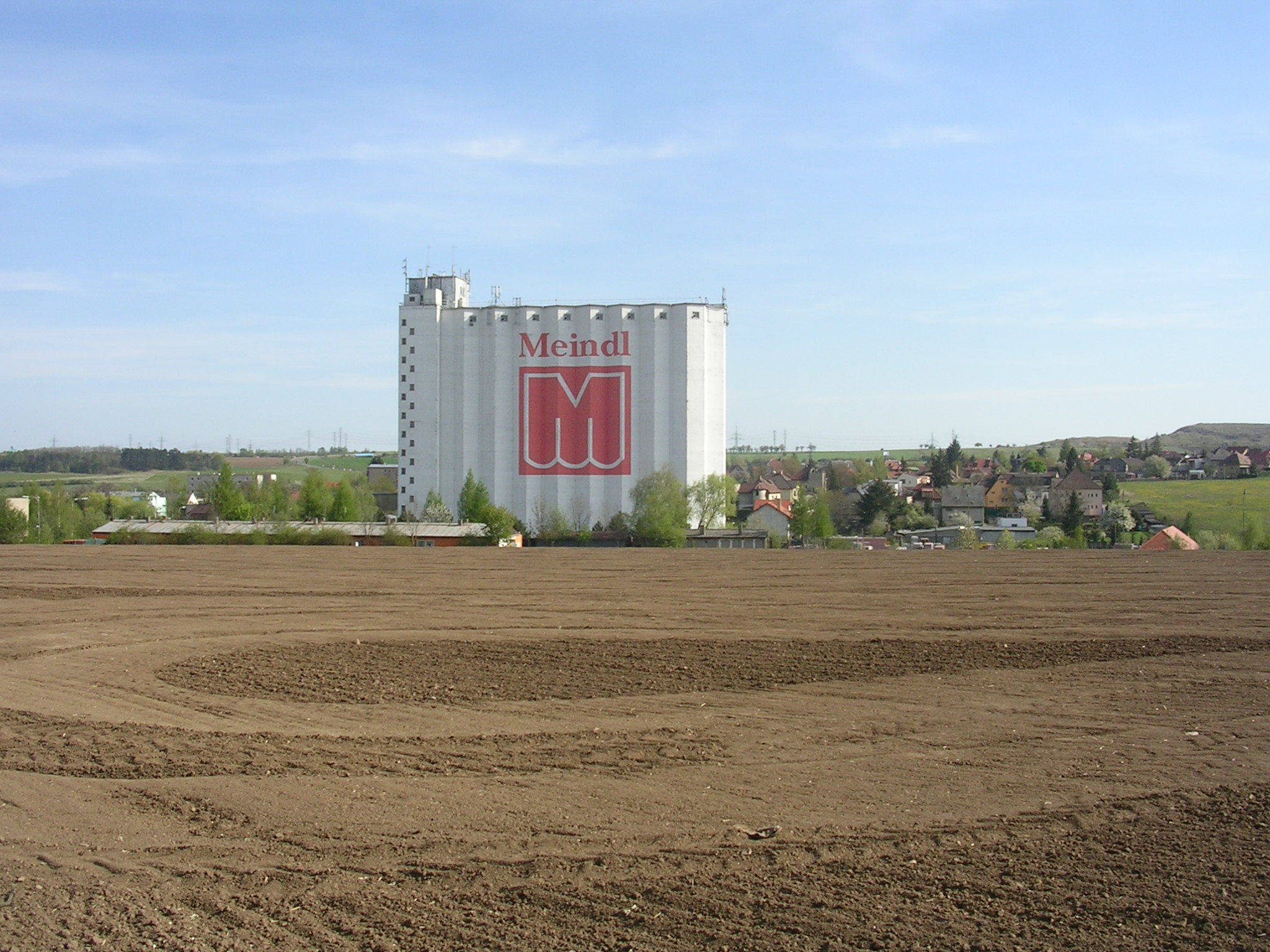
Soufflet Agro silo

== Twin town ==
Řeporyje is twinned with:

- Hostomel, Ukraine
