= Barrandov =

Neighbourhood in Prague, Czech Republic

Coordinates: 50°02′02″N 14°22′59″E

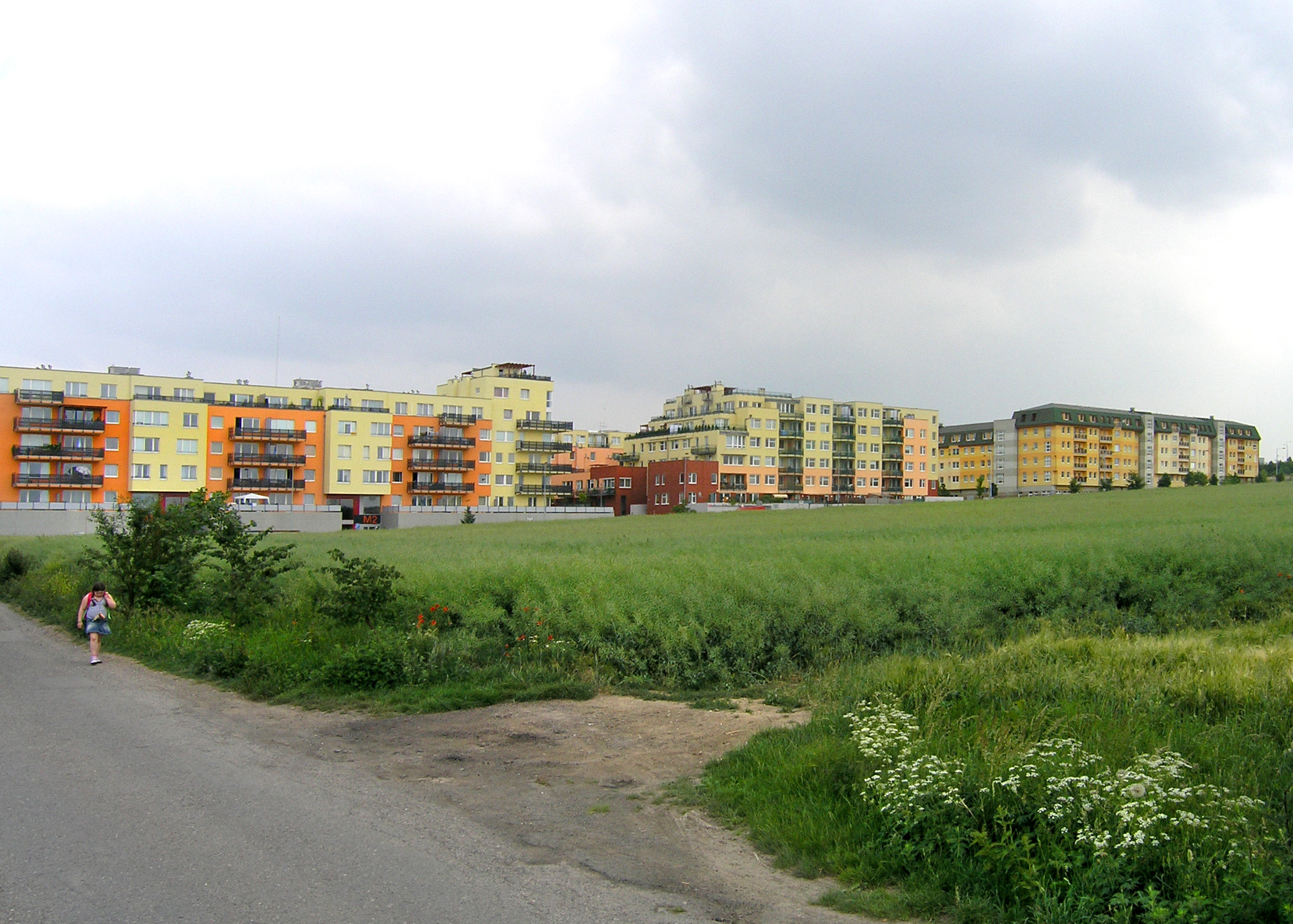
West part of Barrandov housing estate in Hlubočepy, Prague – view from Holyně

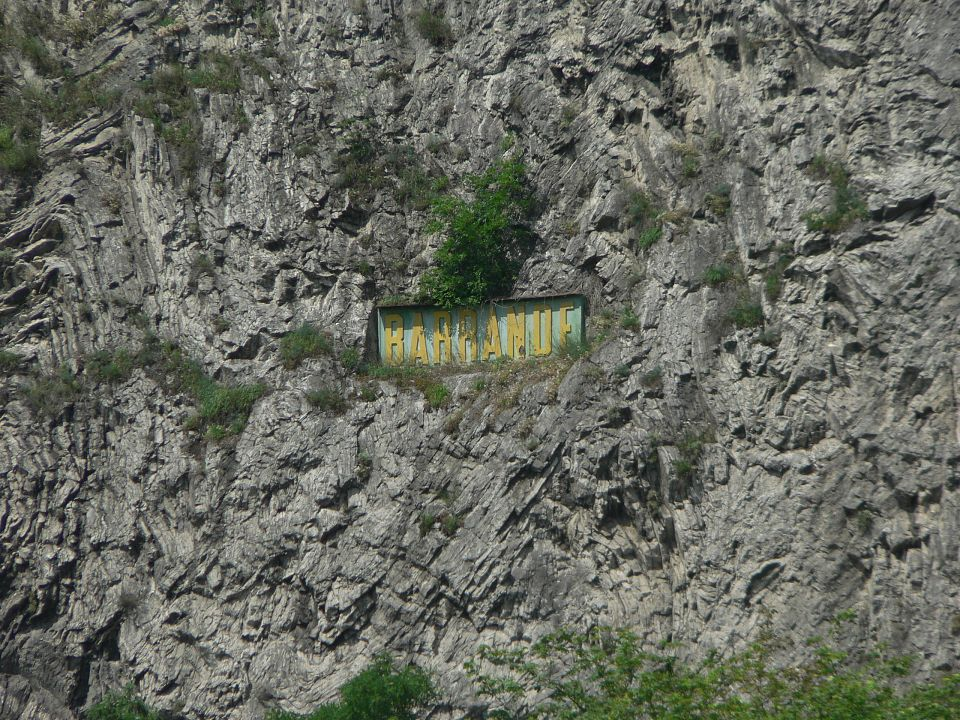
Plaque with Barrande's name in the Barrandov rock

Barrandov is a neighbourhood in southwest Prague, Czech Republic, located in the cadastral district of Hlubočepy, in Prague 5. It is situated on and around some rock formations above the Vltava River. Barrandov is known for its film industry and the film studios located in the old part of the district. The Czech nationwide television services Nova and Barrandov TV broadcast from here. Old Barrandov consists of the villa quarter, Barrandov Terraces, and Barrandov Studios, and New Barrandov is located to the west of the old part. Barrandov has a population of about 20,000. A new tram line into New Barrandov was built in 2003.

The name Barrandov is derived from the fossil-rich rocks that were studied by French geologist Joachim Barrande. The district was named in honour of Barrande on 24 February 1928.

== See also ==
- Prokop valley
