= Prokop Valley =

Recreational area in southwestern Prague, Czechia

Coordinates: 50°02′N 14°22′E

Prokop Valley (Czech: Prokopské údolí) is a recreational area in southwestern Prague, located in the districts of Barrandov, Holyně, Řeporyje, Stodůlky and Hlubočepy. It encompasses two streams, Dalejský potok and Prokopský potok, the latter of which is surrounded by a valley, despite the fact that it is much shorter. The area includes a natural reserve which encompasses a far wider area than the valley.

In the valley there was once a limy open-cast mine, therefore a lake and a cave cropped up. The first attempts to gain lime were in the year 1860. The territory is equipped with benches.

== Illustrations ==
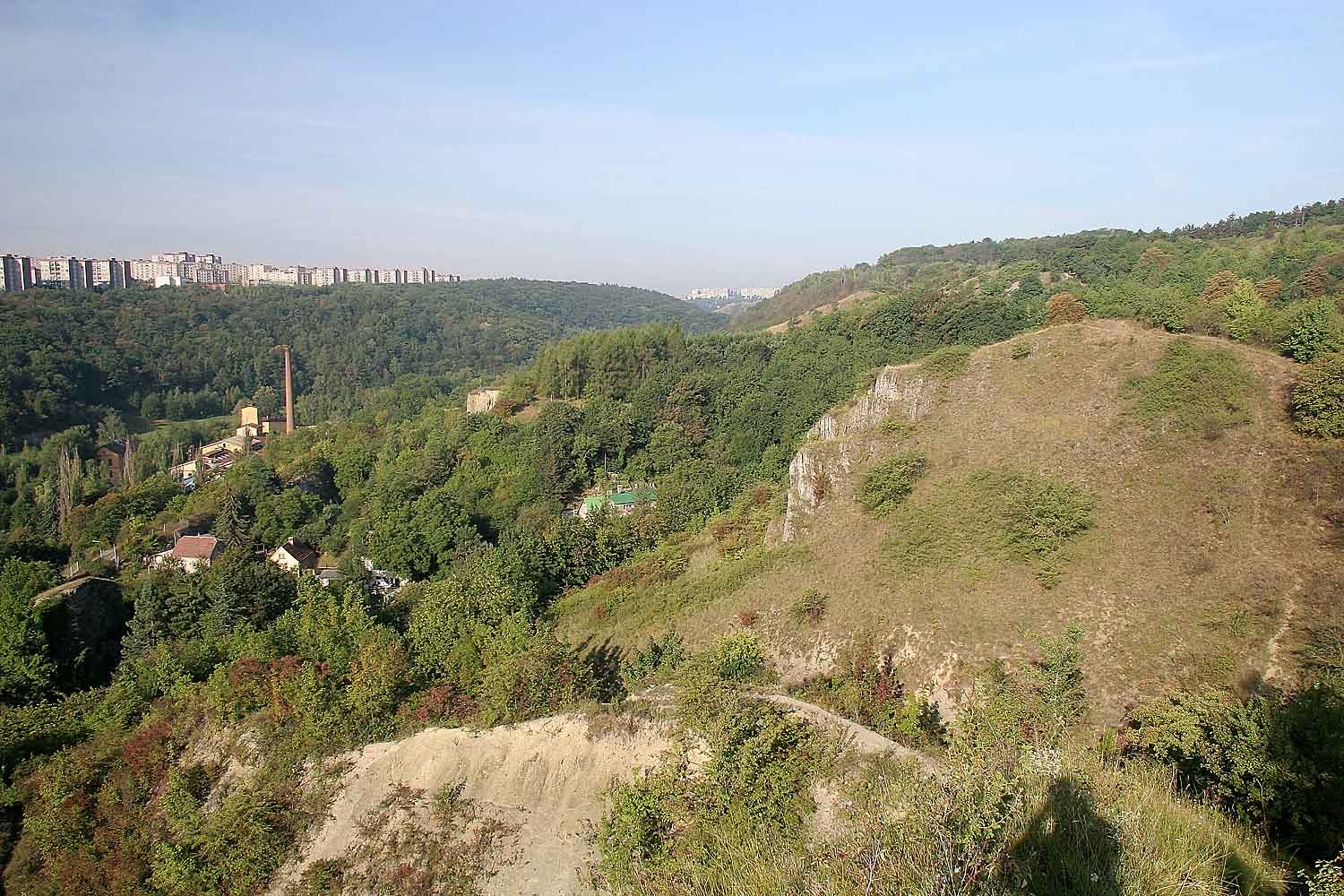
Prokop valley nature reserve

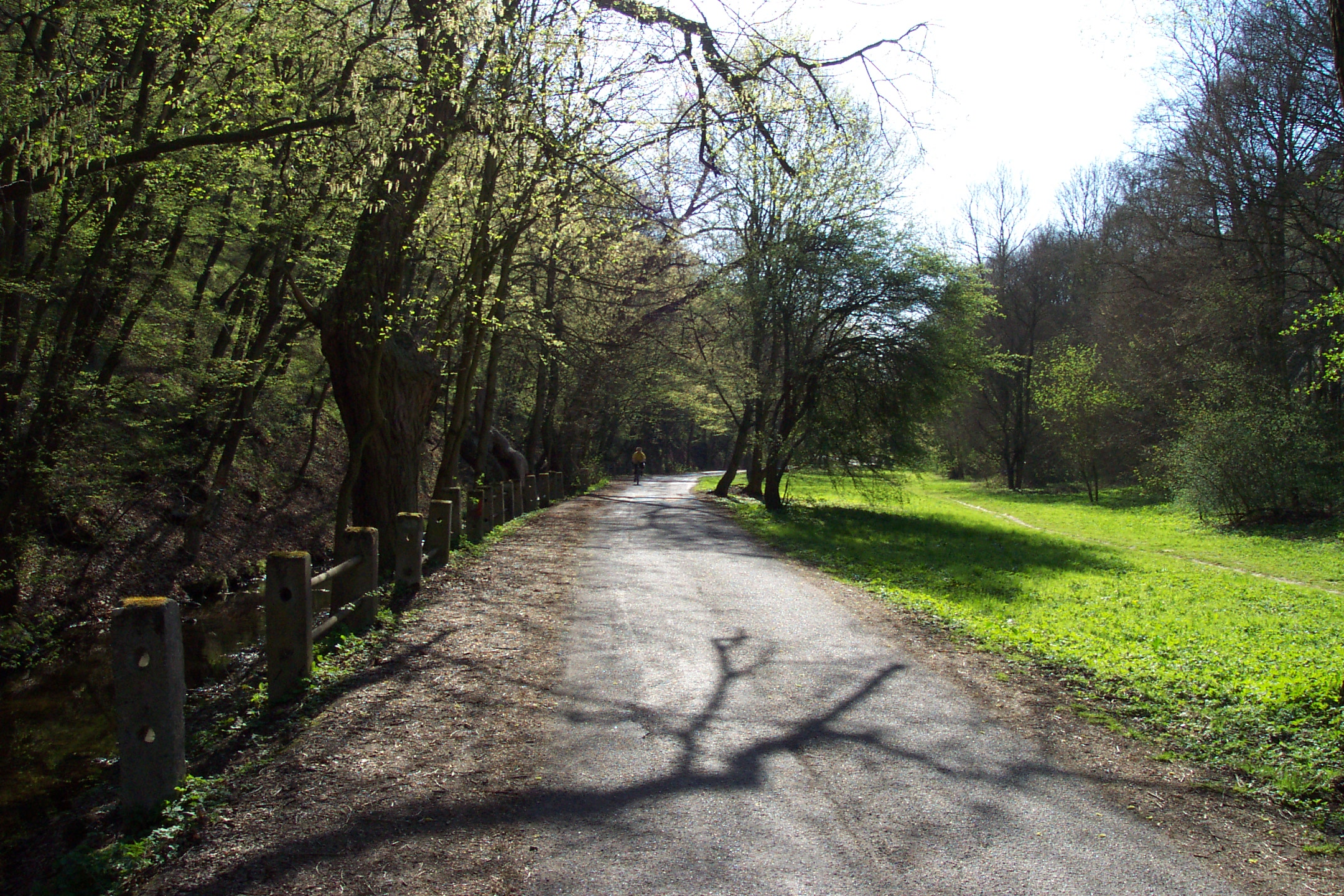
The valley

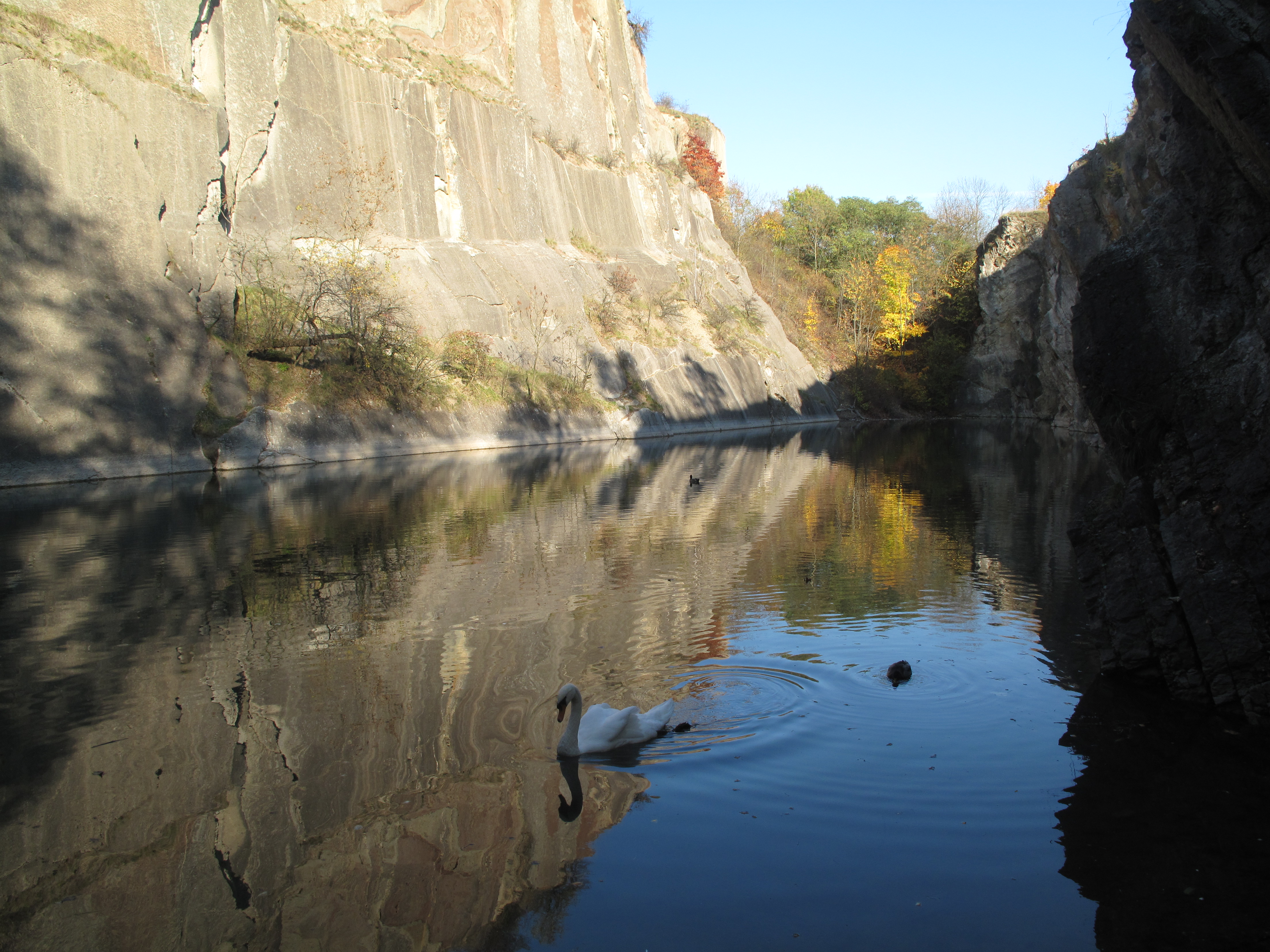
A lake that tourists like

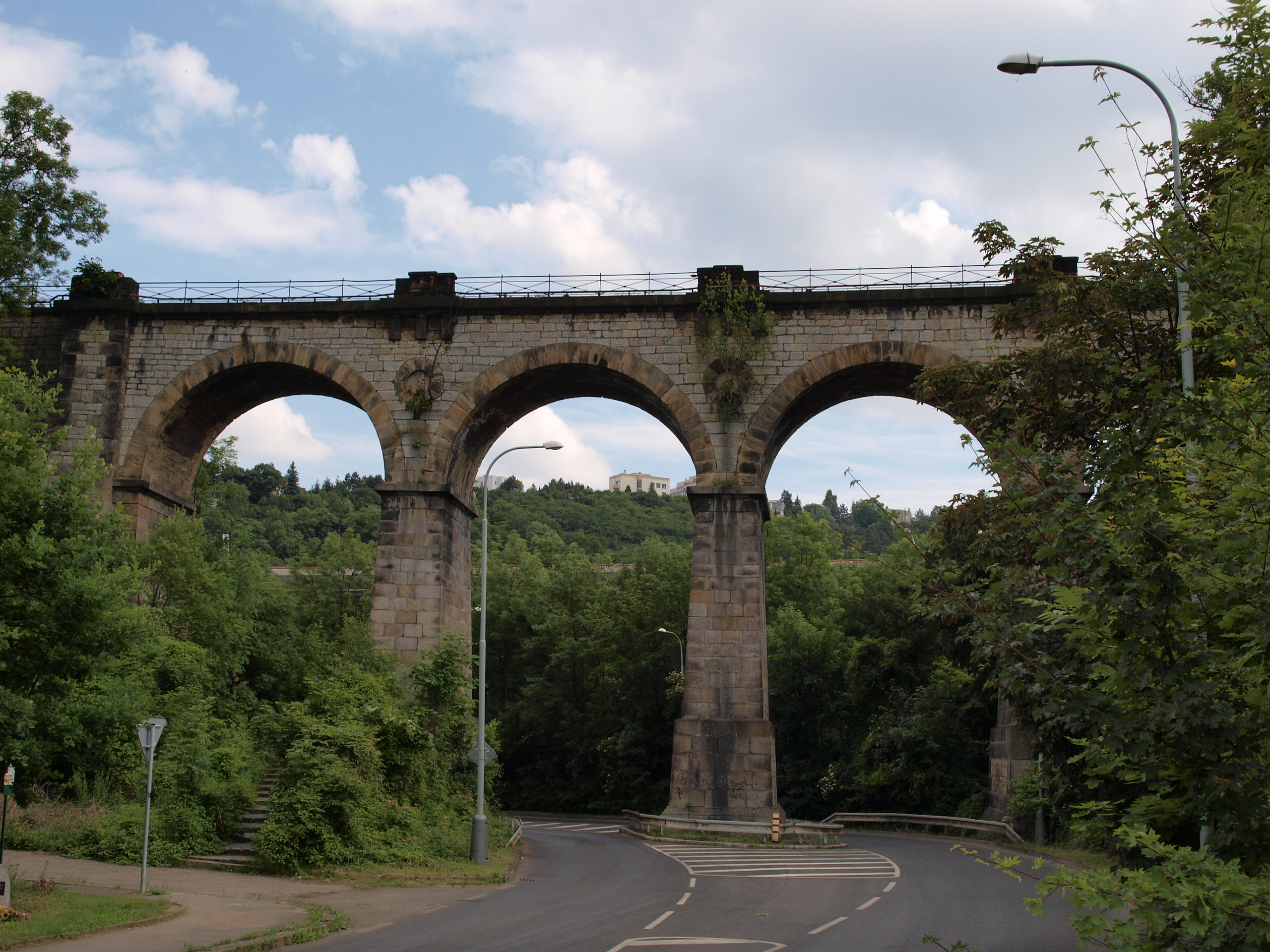
Viaduct on the Prague Semmering railway line

Panorama

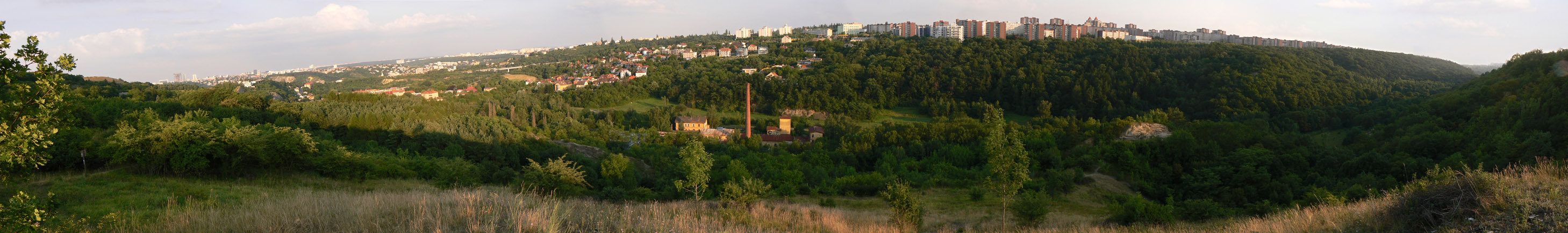

A view over all the surroundings, through the Vltava river to Vyšehrad, which be seen far away to the left
