= Prague Metro =

Rapid transit network in the Czech Republic

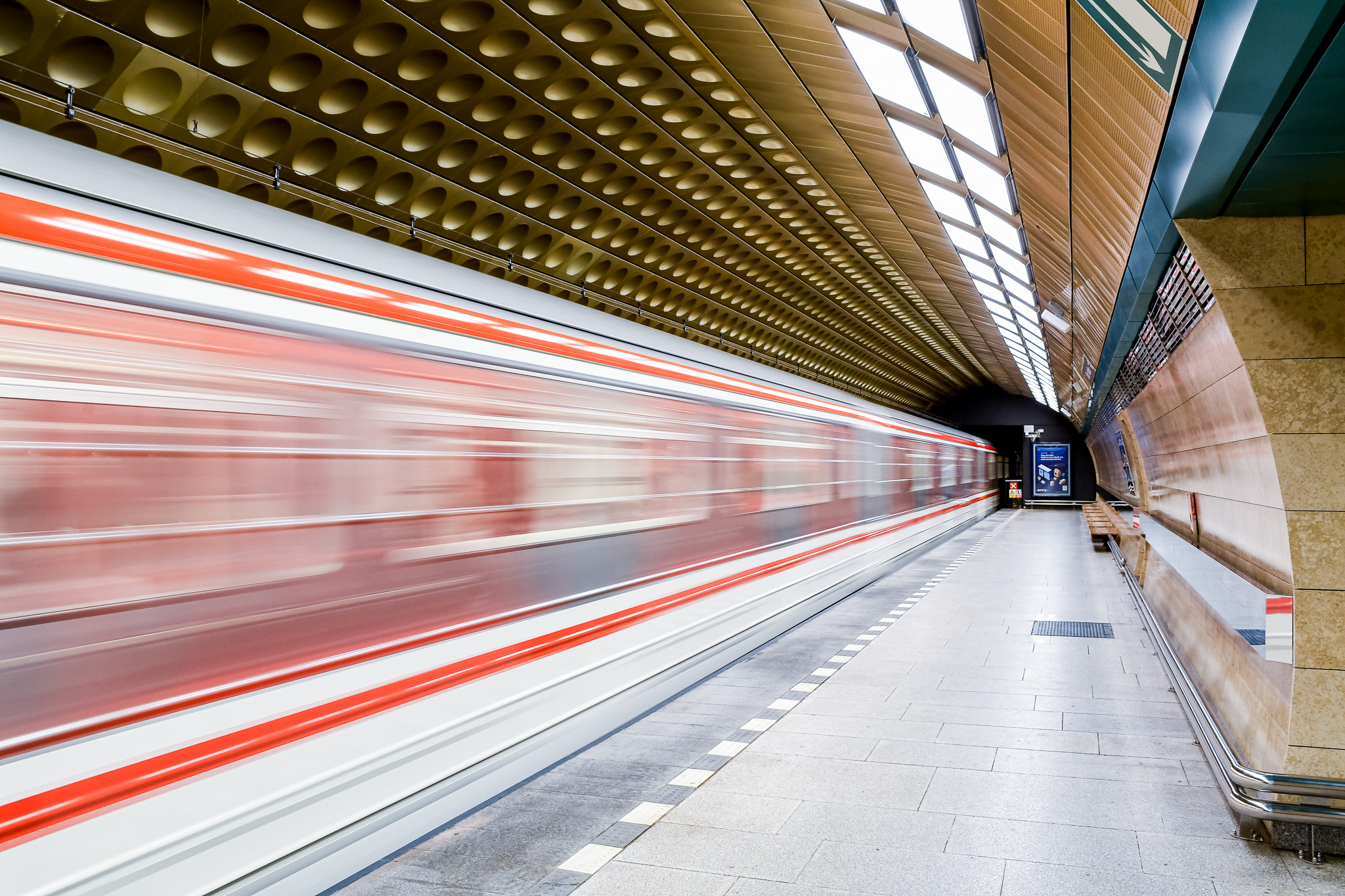
- Jiřího z Poděbrad station on Line A

Overview
- Native name: Pražské metro
- Locale: Prague, Czech Republic
- Transit type: Rapid transit (subway)
- Number of lines: 3 (plus 1 under construction)
- Number of stations: 61 (Note: Counting the three interchange stations, Můstek, Muzeum, and Florenc, twice. If they are counted only once, the total number of stations is 58.)
- Daily ridership: 1.55 million (2021)
- Annual ridership: 589.2 million (2012)
- Website: pid.cz/en/metro/

Operation
- Began operation: 9 May 1974; 52 years ago
- Operator: Prague Public Transit Company
- Number of vehicles: 730
- Train length: 5 cars

Technical
- System length: 65.4 km (40.6 mi)
- Track gauge: 1,435 mm (4 ft 8 1/2 in)
- Electrification: 750 V DC third rail
- Average speed: 36 kilometres per hour (22 mph)
- Top speed: 80 kilometres per hour (50 mph)

The Prague Metro (Czech: Pražské metro) is the rapid transit network of Prague, Czech Republic. Founded in 1974, the system consists of three lines (A, B and C) serving 61 stations (predominantly with island platforms), and is 65.2 kilometres (40.5 mi) long. The system served 568 million passengers in 2021 (about 1.55 million daily). The metro is part of Prague Integrated Transport system (Pražská integrovaná doprava, PID) and is operated by the Prague Public Transit Company.

Two types of rolling stock are used on the Metro: the 81-71M (a completely modernized variant of the original 81-717/714.1), and the Metro M1. All the lines are controlled automatically from the central dispatching, near I. P. Pavlova station.

== Basic information ==
The system is run by the Prague Public Transit Company which also manages the other means of public transport around the city, including the trams, buses, five ferries, the funicular to Petřín Hill, and the chairlift inside the Prague Zoo.

Since 1993, the system has been connected to commuter trains and buses, and also to "park-and-ride" parking lots. Together, they form an extensive public transport network reaching further from the city, called Prague Integrated Transport (Czech: Pražská integrovaná doprava, PID). Whilst the large system is zonally priced, the Metro is entirely inside the central zone.

=== Lines ===
The Prague Metro has three lines and one "Line D" under construction, each represented by its own colour on the maps and signs: Line A (green, 17 stations, 17 km (10.6 mi)), Line B (yellow, 24 stations, 26 km (16.2 mi)) and Line C (red, 20 stations, 22 km (13.7 mi)). There are 58 stations in total (three of which are transfer stations) connected by nearly 66 kilometres of mostly underground railways. Service operates from 4–5 am until midnight, with two- to three-minute intervals between trains during rush hours and four to ten minutes between trains at other times. Nearly 600 million passengers use the Prague Metro every year (about 1.6 million daily).

Prague Metro
| Line | Color | Opened | Year of last expansion | Route | Length | Stations |
|---|---|---|---|---|---|---|
| A Line A | Green | 1978 | 2015 | Nemocnice Motol ↔ Depo Hostivař | 17.1 km (10.6 mi) | 17 |
| B Line B | Yellow | 1985 | 1998 | Zličín ↔ Černý Most | 25.6 km (15.9 mi) | 24 |
| C Line C | Red | 1974 | 2008 | Letňany ↔ Háje | 21.4 km (13.3 mi) | 20 |
| D Line D | Blue | Scheduled for 2031 | n/a | Náměstí Míru ↔ Depo Písnice | 0 km (0 mi) | (10 expected when opened in 2031) |
| Total | | | | | 63.1 km (39.2 mi) | 61 |

Prague Metro map

=== System layout and stations ===
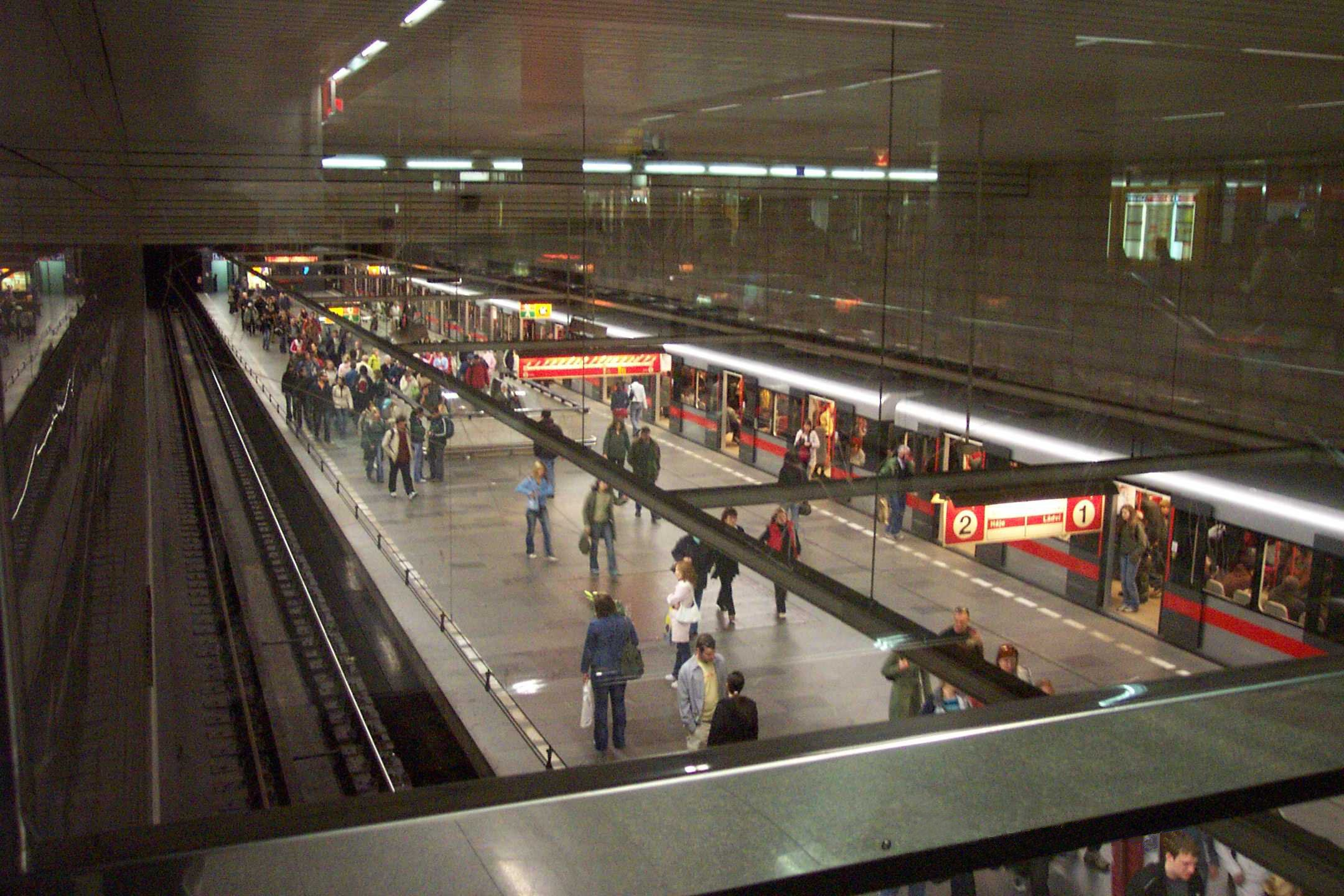
Muzeum station on Line C

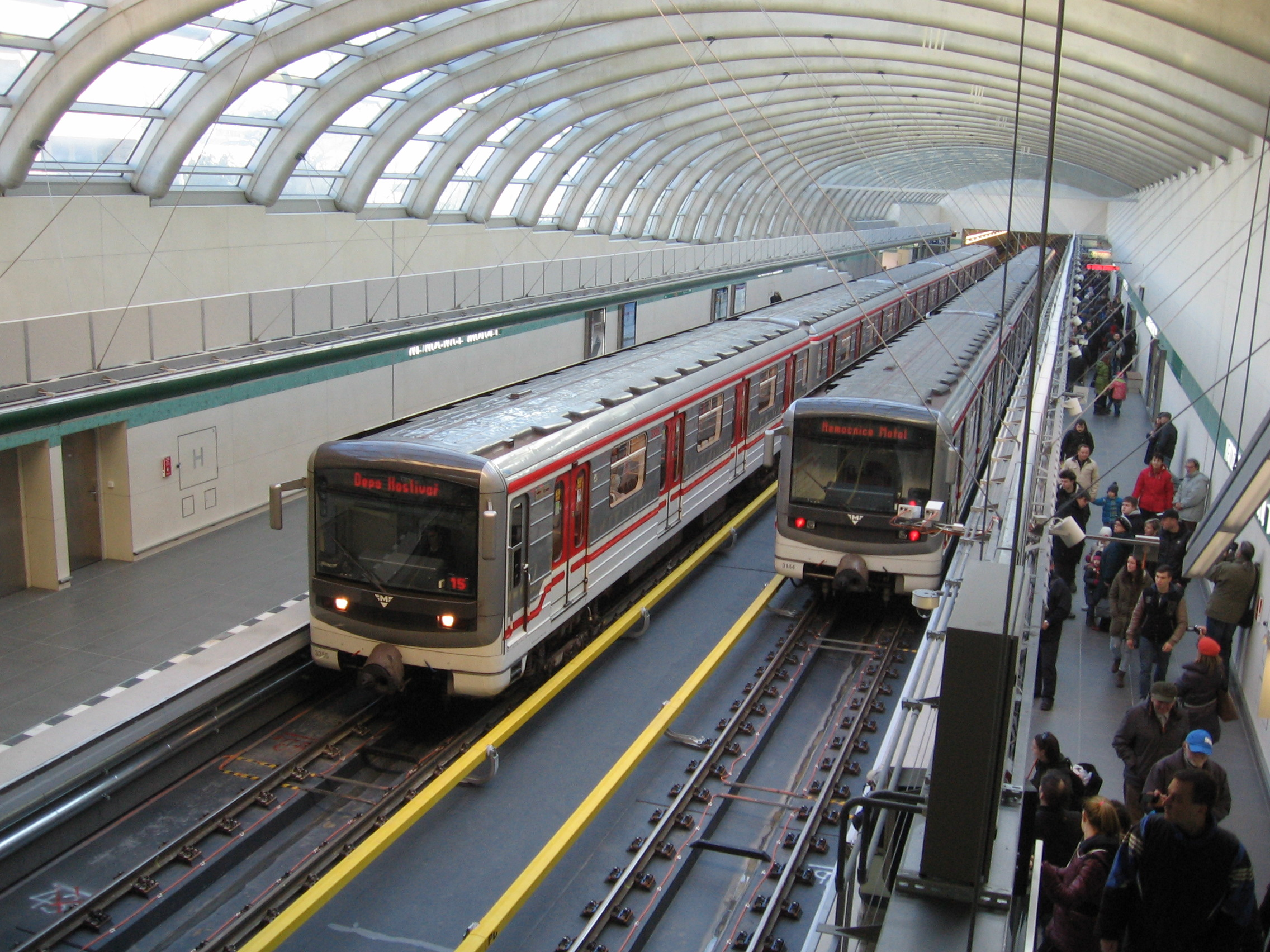
Nemocnice Motol (Motol Hospital) station on Line A

The Prague Metro system is radial, with each line running through the city centre from termini in the outskirts; however, the lines do not meet at a single central station. Rather, the three lines form a triangle in the centre of the city, with three interchange stations at the vertices of the triangle: Florenc, Můstek, and Muzeum. Each interchange station has two halls, one hall for each line.

The depth of the stations (and the connecting lines) varies considerably. The deepest station is Náměstí Míru, located 52 metres (171 ft) under the ground. Parts of the tracks in the city centre were mostly bored using a tunnelling shield. Outer parts were dug by a cut-and-cover method, and these stations are only a few metres under the surface. Part of Line B runs in a glassed-in tunnel above the ground.

Most stations have a single island platform in the centre of the station hall (tunnel) serving both directions. The sub-surface stations have a straight ceiling sometimes supported by columns, while the deep-level stations are larger tunnels with the track tunnels on each side. The walls of many stations are decorated using coloured aluminium panels; each station has its own colour. Some stations are considered among the finest in Europe.

Many stations are quite large, with several entrances spaced relatively far apart. This can often lead to confusion for those unfamiliar with the system, and a solution to resolve this is being implemented; a new wayfinding system in several phases across Prague, and its public transportation, called Legible Prague.

== Rolling stock ==
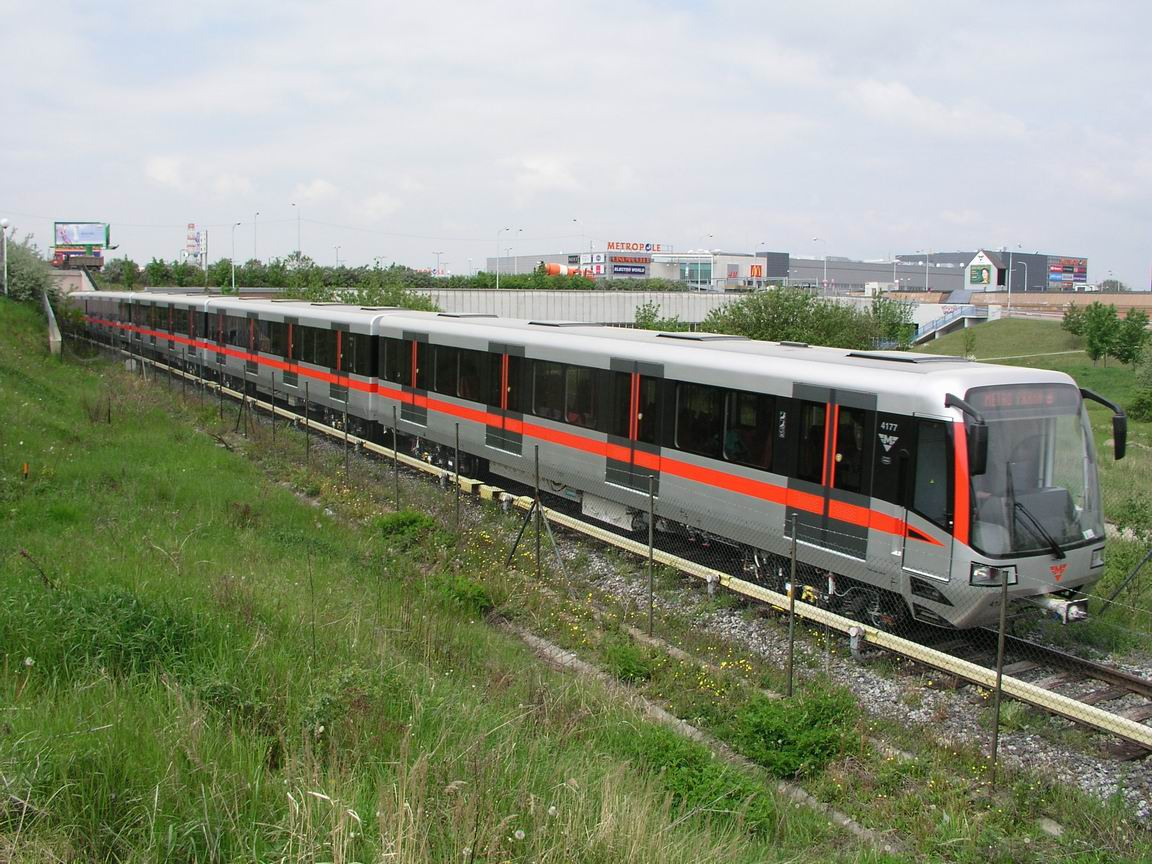
Metro M1 train on a test track

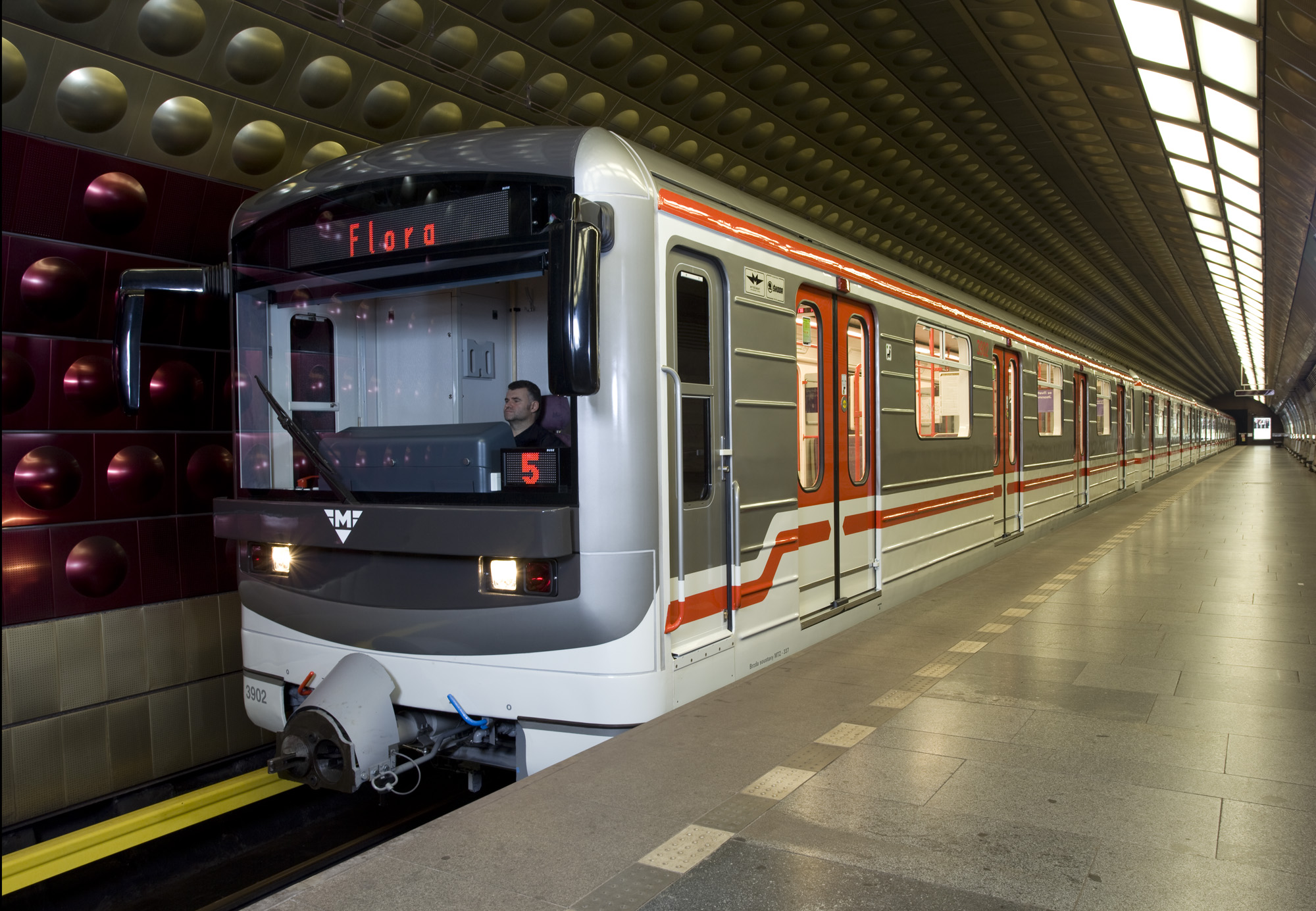
81-71M train

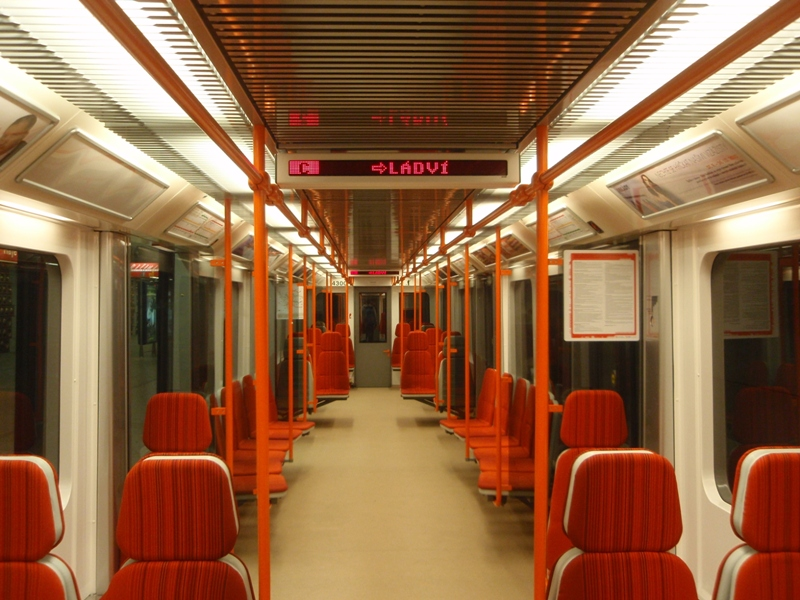
Inside a Metro M1 car

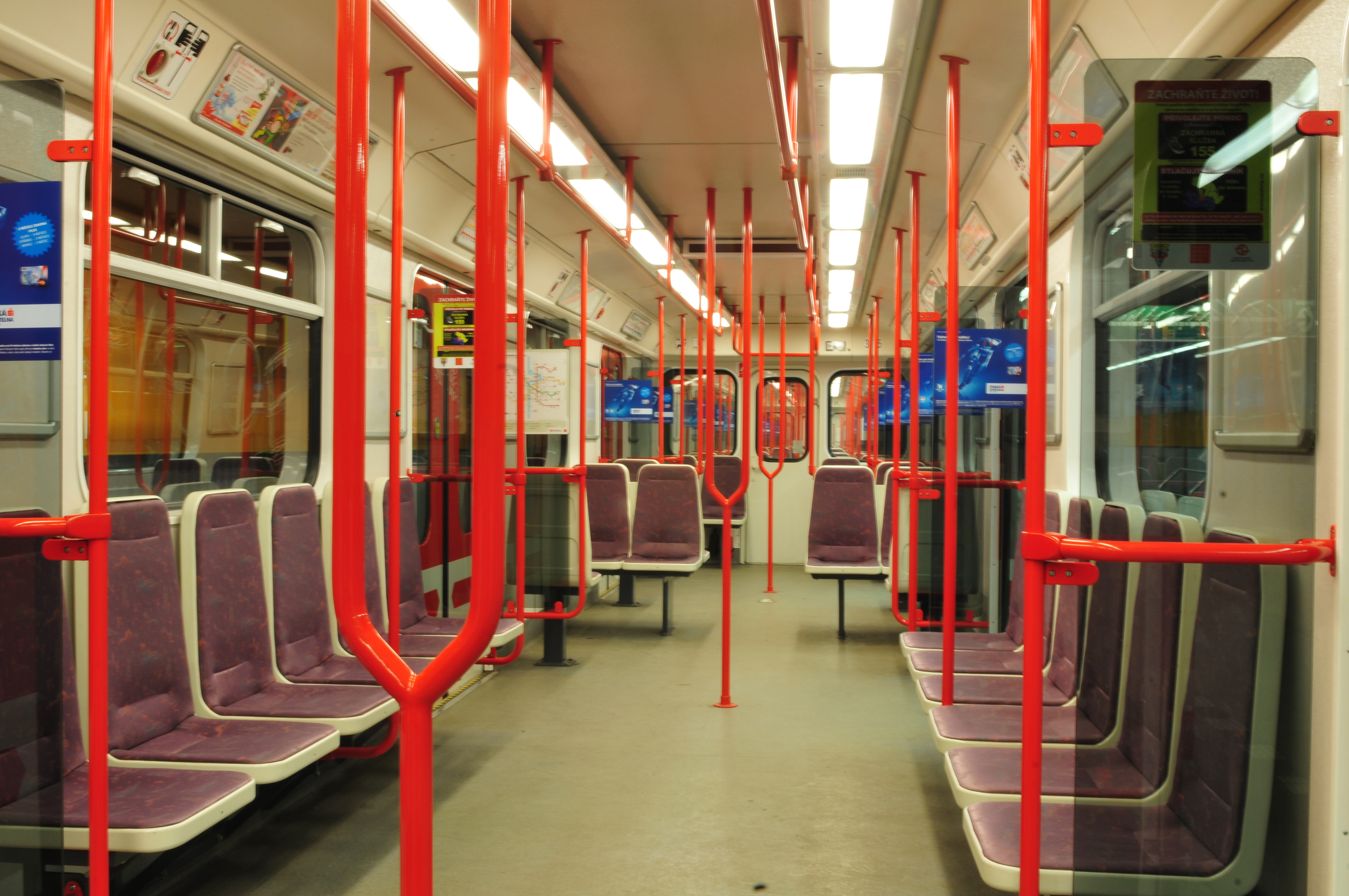
Inside an 81-71M car

=== Metro M1 ===
Metro M1 trains have operated on Line C since 2000; they completely replaced older cars on this line in 2003. DPP owns 265 of these cars, which form 53 five-car trains. These cars were developed specially for Prague, and were manufactured there between 2000 and 2003 by a consortium consisting of ČKD Praha, ADtranz and Siemens (during the contract, Siemens acquired ČKD Praha). The total length of the train is 96.66 metres (317 ft 2 in), the acceleration is 1.3 m/s^{2} (4.3 ft/s^{2}), and the total capacity of the train is 1,464 people (224 sitting, 1,240 standing). This unit was also adapted for use in Venezuela on the Maracaibo Metro.

=== 81-71M ===
81-71M trains are a modernized variant of the old Soviet 81-717 trains with new traction motors, technical equipment, interiors, and exteriors. They have operated on Lines A and B since 1996. The modernization was conducted by Škoda Transportation and ČKD between 1996 and 2011. DPP owns 465 81-71M cars, which form 93 five-car trains. The total length of the train is 96.11 metres (315 ft 4 in), and the acceleration is identical to that of the Metro M1 cars, at 1.3 m/s^{2} (4.3 ft/s^{2}). Similar reconstructions were also made on the Tbilisi Metro and Yerevan Metro, as well as a near-identical version exported to Kyiv from Metrowagonmash as part of the Slavutich project, designated 81-553.1, 81–554.1 and 81-555.1.

=== Previously in service ===
81-71 manufactured by Metrovagonmash were gradually phased out and replaced by the modernized versions, with their service ending on 2 July 2009. One vehicle is stored in the Museum of Prague public transport, while one fully-operational train of five cars stays in the Zličín (B) depot for special occasions.

The Ečs trains manufactured by Metrovagonmash, that ran on Line C, were in service from 1974 to 1997. One vehicle is also stored in the Prague Public Transport Museum, while one fully-operational train of three cars is stored in the Zličín (B) depot.

== History ==
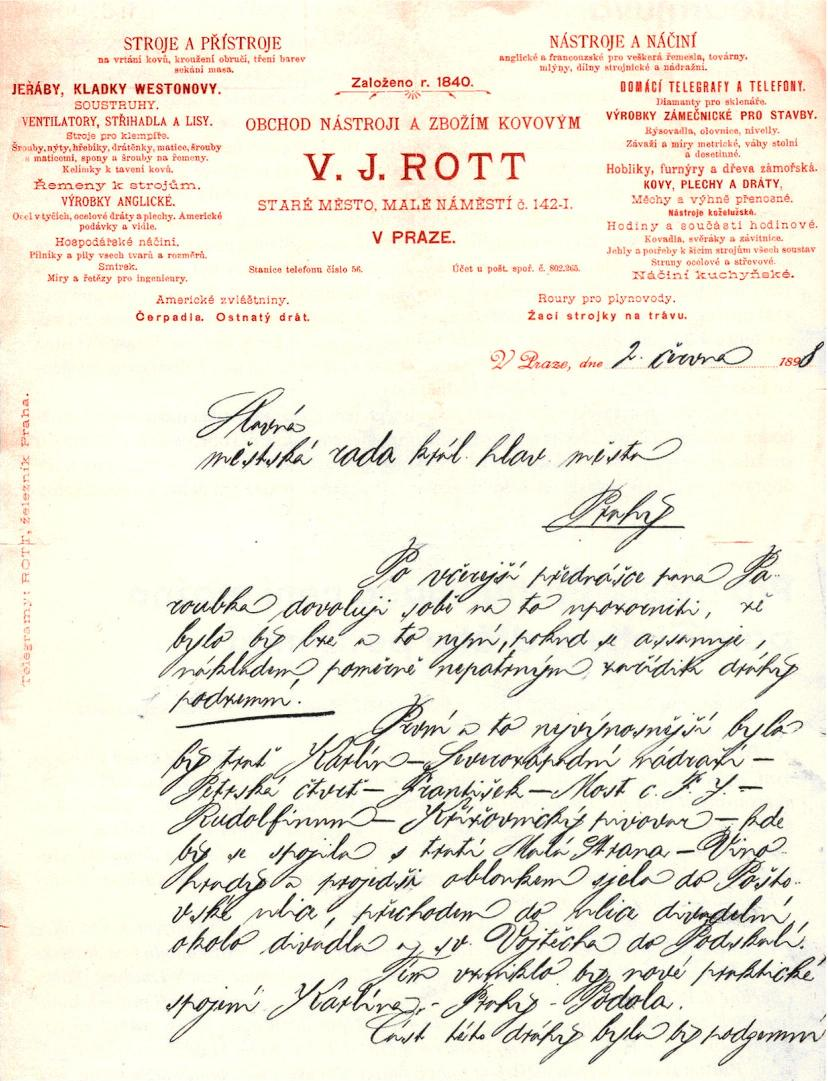
Ladislav Rott's proposal to the Prague City Council

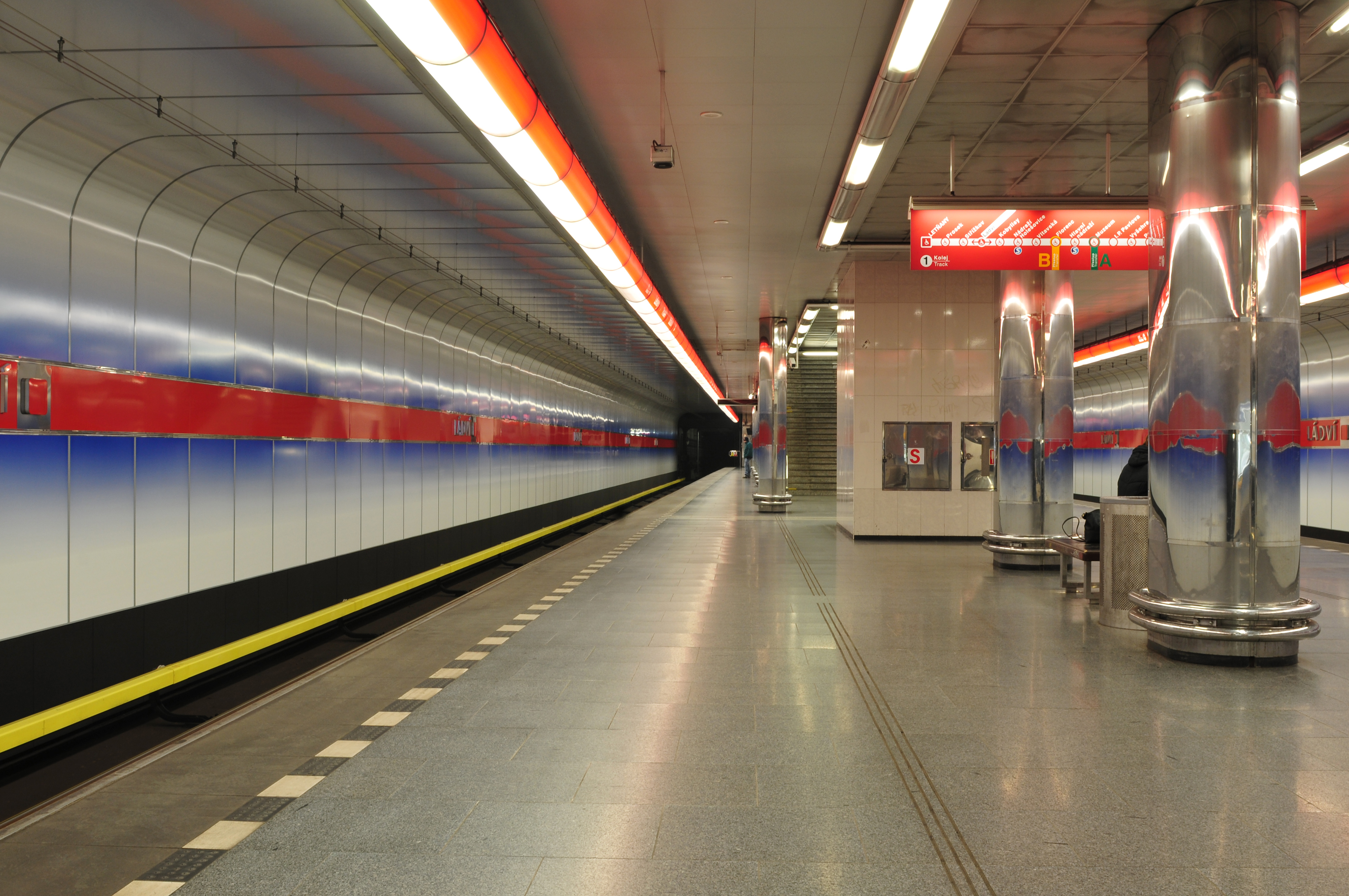
Ládví, Line C

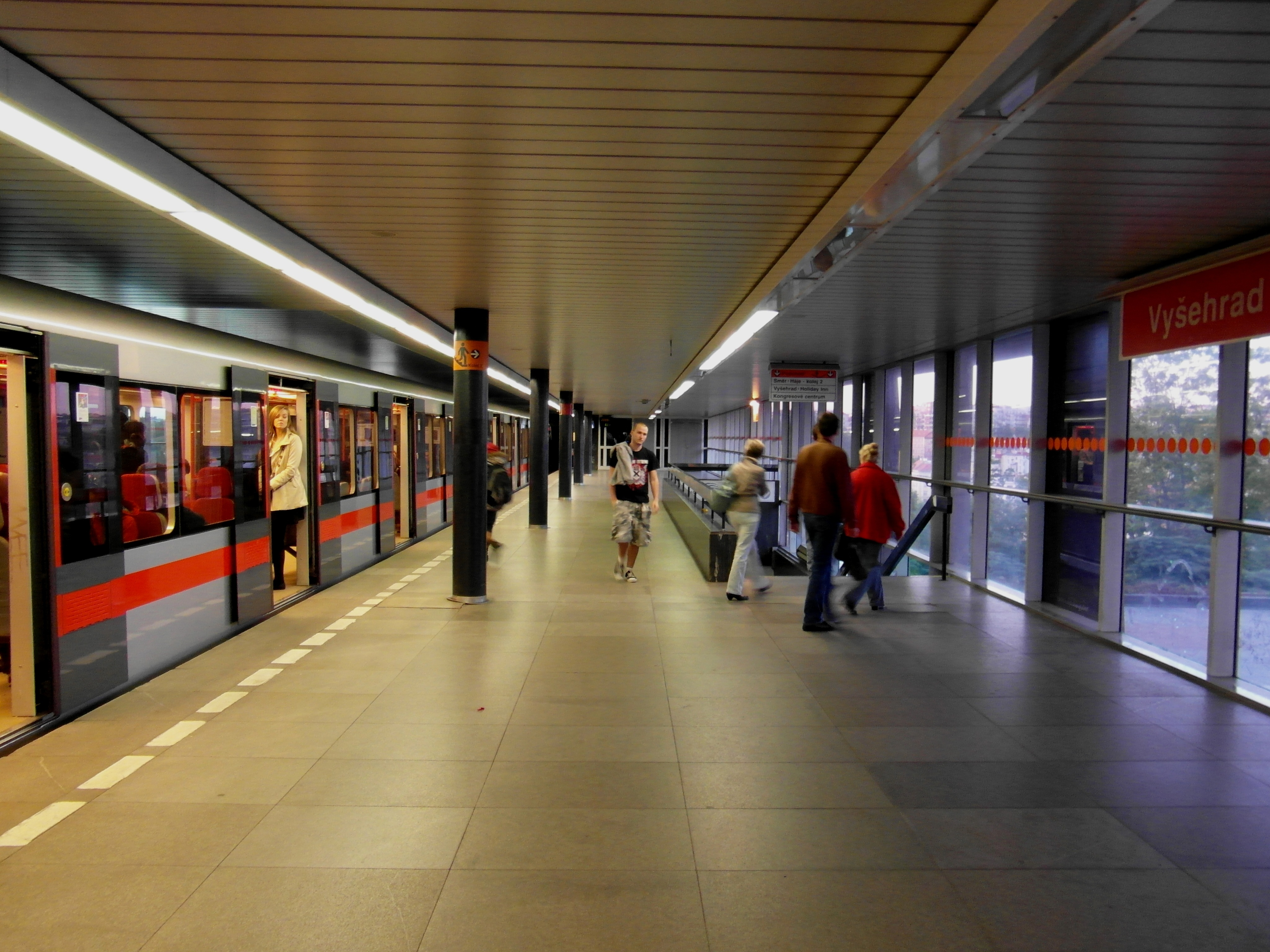
Vyšehrad station on Line C

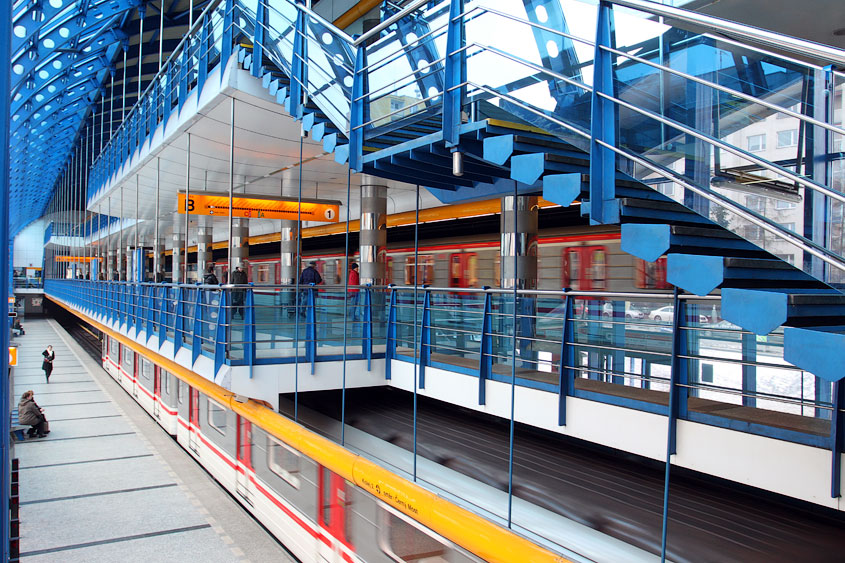
For its unorthodox three-level platform design, Rajská zahrada station was named Czech Building of the Year in 1999.

Although the Prague Metro system is relatively new, the idea of underground transport in Prague dates back many years. The first proposal to build a sub-surface railway was made by Ladislav Rott in 1898. He encouraged the city council to take advantage of the fact that parts of the central city were already being dug up for sewer work. Rott wanted them to start digging tunnels for the railway at the same time. However, the plan was denied by the city authorities. Another proposal in 1926, by Bohumil Belada and Vladimír List, was the first to use the term "Metro", and though it was not accepted either, it served as an impulse for moving towards a real solution of the rapidly developing transport in Prague.

In the 1930s and 1940s, intensive projection and planning works took place, taking into account two possible solutions: an underground tramway (regular rolling stock going underground in the city centre, nowadays described as a "premetro", "Stadtbahn" or "subway-surface line") and a "true" metro having its own independent system of railways. After World War II, all work was stopped due to the poor economic situation of the country, although the three lines, A, B and C, had been almost fully designed.

In the early 1960s the concept of the sub-surface tramway was finally accepted and on 9 August 1967 the building of the first station (Hlavní nádraží) started. However, in the same year, a substantial change in the concept came, as the government after criticism by architects and urban planners, subsequently supported by Soviet advisers, decided to build a true metro system instead of an underground tramway. Thus, during the first years, the construction continued while the whole project was conceptually transformed. During the construction of the metro, a Czech rolling stock manufacturer, ČKD Tatra Smíchov, was charged with designing the trains. Two prototype two-car units under the name R1 were constructed in 1970 and 1971 and were used for field testing. However, the then-Czechoslovak government decided instead to order the trains for the underground from the Soviet Union (which would soon become Ečs, part of the Soviet "E" series, standing for "E Czechoslovak"). The R1 rolling stock would later be scrapped in the 1980s, near the end of the Cold War. Regular service on the first section of Line C began on 9 May 1974 between Sokolovská (now Florenc) and Kačerov stations.

Since then, many extensions have been built and the number of lines has risen to three.

On 22 February 1990, 13 station names reflecting mostly communist ideology were changed to be politically neutral. For example, Leninova station, which contained a giant bust of Vladimir Lenin before the Velvet Revolution, was renamed Dejvická after a nearby street and surrounding neighbourhood. Other changes were:

- Dukelská – Nové Butovice
- Švermova – Jinonice
- Moskevská – Anděl
- Sokolovská – Florenc
- Fučíkova – Nádraží Holešovice
- Gottwaldova – Vyšehrad
- Mládežnická – Pankrác
- Primátora Vacka – Roztyly
- Budovatelů – Chodov
- Družby – Opatov
- Kosmonautů – Háje.

=== Flooding ===
Extent of flooding in the Metro network in 2002

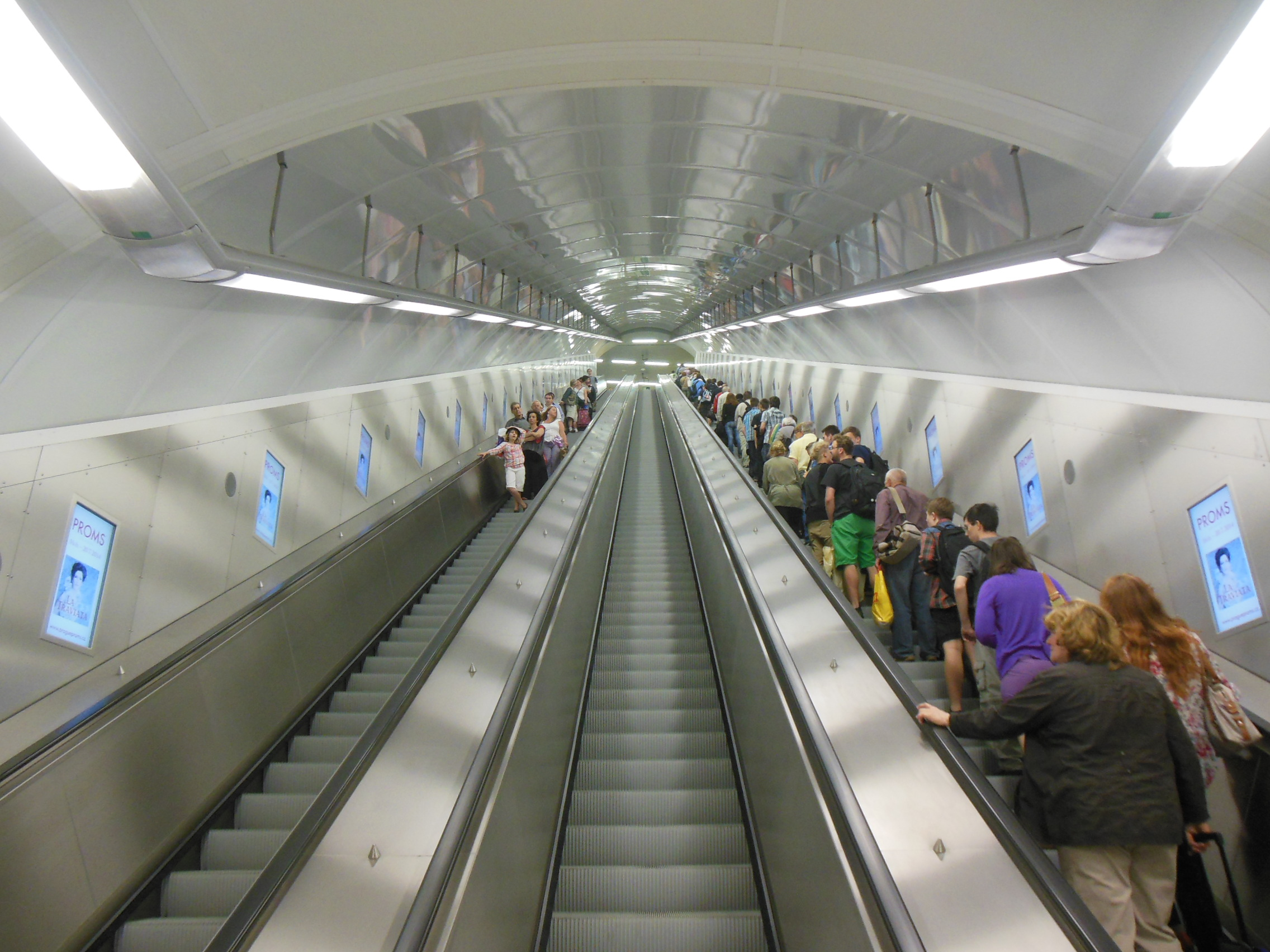
Escalators at Národní třída

In August 2002, the system suffered disastrous flooding that struck parts of Bohemia and other areas in Central Europe (see 2002 European flood). 19 stations were flooded, causing a partial collapse of the transport system in Prague; the damage to the Metro has been estimated at 7 billion CZK (over US$225 million in exchange rate at that time). The affected sections of the Metro stayed out of service for several months; the last station (Křižíkova, located in the most-damaged area – Karlín) reopened in March 2003. Small gold plates have been placed at some stations to show the highest water level of the flood. Service was suspended between:

- Radlická and Kolbenova on Line B
- Malostranská and Náměstí Míru on Line A
- Hlavní nádraží and Nádraží Holešovice on Line C (before the extension to Ládví in 2004 and to Letňany in 2008)

A number of stations were closed due to flooding in June 2013. Replacement trams ran between Dejvická and Muzeum on Line A and Českomoravská and Smíchovské nádraží on Line B, and replacement buses between Kobylisy and Muzeum on Line C due to closed sections of the track.

== Extensions ==
Prague Metro extensions

After regular service on the first section of Line C began in 1974 between Florenc and Kačerov, building of extensions continued quite rapidly. In 1978, Line A was opened, and Line B opened in 1985, thus forming the triangle with three crossing points. Since then, the lines have been extended outwards from the centre.

In 1980 and 1990, Line A was extended eastward from Náměstí Míru to Želivského and Skalka. Line B was extended from Nové Butovice to Zličín in 1994 and from Českomoravská to Černý Most in 1998, and the Kolbenova and Hloubětín stations were opened in 2001. Expansion of Line C was carried out in 1980 (Kačerov – Háje) and 1984 (Florenc – Nádraží Holešovice).

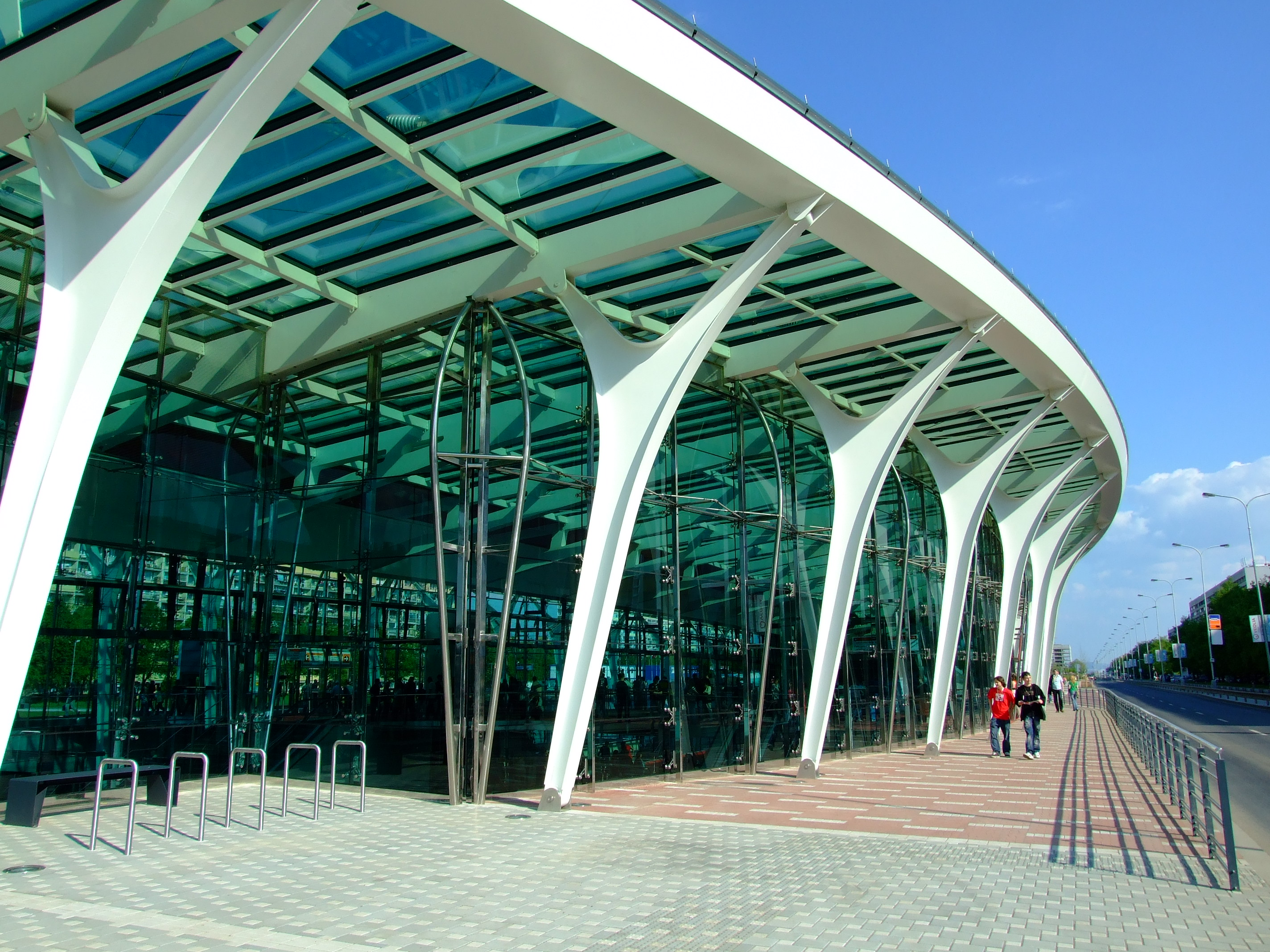
Střížkov station, Line C

A northern extension of Line C was opened on 26 June 2004, with two more stations, Kobylisy and Ládví. New tunnels were built under the Vltava river using a unique "ejecting-tunnels" technology. First, a trench was excavated in the riverbed and the concrete tunnels constructed in dry docks on the riverbank. Then the docks were flooded, and the floating tunnels were moved as a rigid complex to their final position, sunk, anchored, and covered.

Line A was extended to the east on 26 May 2006, when a new terminus, Depo Hostivař, opened. The station was constructed within the railway depot.

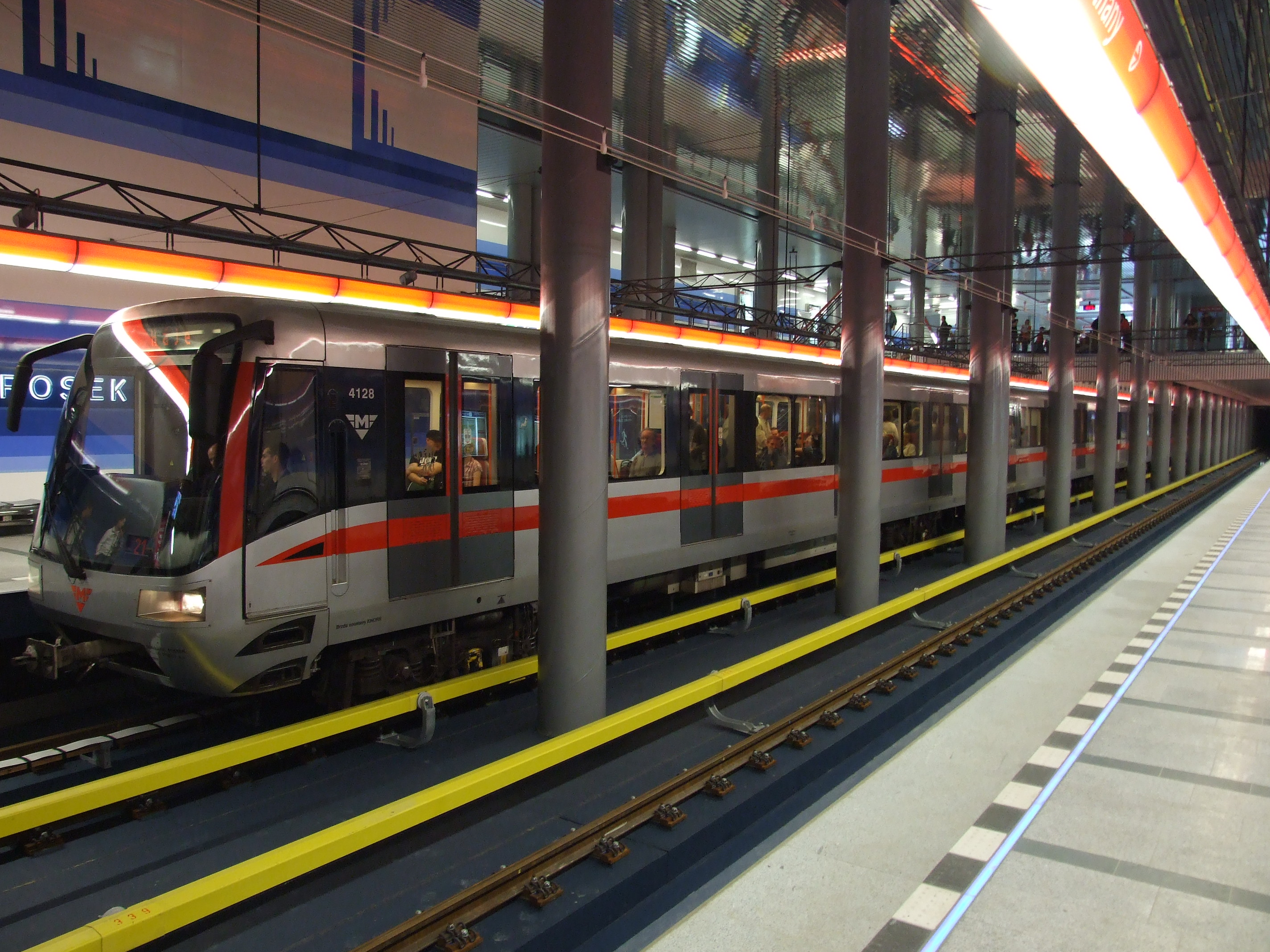
Prosek station, Line C

Line C was extended to the northeast to connect the city center to the housing blocks at Prosek and a large shopping centre at Letňany. Three stations (Střížkov, Prosek, and Letňany) opened on 8 May 2008.

In April 2015, Line A was extended westward from Dejvická to Nemocnice Motol with four new stations: Bořislavka, Nádraží Veleslavín, Petřiny, and Nemocnice Motol. The Nádraží Veleslavín station is also the new terminus of the 59 trolleybus to Václav Havel Airport.

Plans for an extension to the airport have been proposed, but never put into action. According to estimates from 2018 the project would cost about 26.8 billion crowns and take 11 years to complete.

== Future plans ==
Another phase of the extension of Line A was planned from Nemocnice Motol to the Václav Havel Airport, but this has been scrapped in order to prioritise a rail line connecting to the airport.

=== Line D ===
The construction of a new line, Line D (blue) has begun, starting from 2022, which will connect the city centre to southern parts of the city. According to current plans, the line will run for 11 kilometers and start in the city center and lead to Vršovice, Krč, Libuš, and Písnice. There will be 10 stations: Náměstí Míru (transfer to Line A), Náměstí bratří Synků, Pankrác (transfer to Line C), Olbrachtova, Nádraží Krč, Nemocnice Krč, Nové Dvory, Libuš, Písnice and Depo Písnice. Line D would be critical in improving the traffic situation in the southern and southeastern part of the city. In the second stage it is planned to extend this line from Pankrác to Náměstí Míru (Peace Square). The first part of Line D is planned to be built between 2022 and 2029. On 19th December 2025, transfer station Pankrác reopened after almost a year of modernisation. New transfer lines to the upcoming Line D were included in this modernisation.

=== Line E ===
Line E, also referred to as Metro O, is a proposed fifth line that would form a tangential, partly circular route connecting the existing lines outside the city centre. The idea dates back to the 1980s, when a preliminary route was defined by Metroprojekt; a reserve for the line has been included in the new land-use plan (Metropolitní plán). In the beginning of the 21st century, there were discussions regarding it in connection with plans to organise the Summer Olympic Games in Prague, which were however cancelled. The Praha sobě list endorsed the idea of a circular metro line during the run-up to the 2022 Prague municipal election.

On 7 September 2026 the Prague City Council approved a feasibility study, prepared by the Prague Institute of Planning and Development (IPR), which is to determine the route, the interchange stations and the technology (conventional metro, rapid tram or a rubber-tyred hybrid system). According to the preliminary route, the approximately 22-kilometre (14 mi) line would run from Nádraží Smíchov via Pankrác/Budějovická, Želivského, Vysočanská and Letňany to the planned Terminál Sever, connecting with all four existing and planned lines. Its cost has been estimated at around 220 billion CZK.

== Features ==
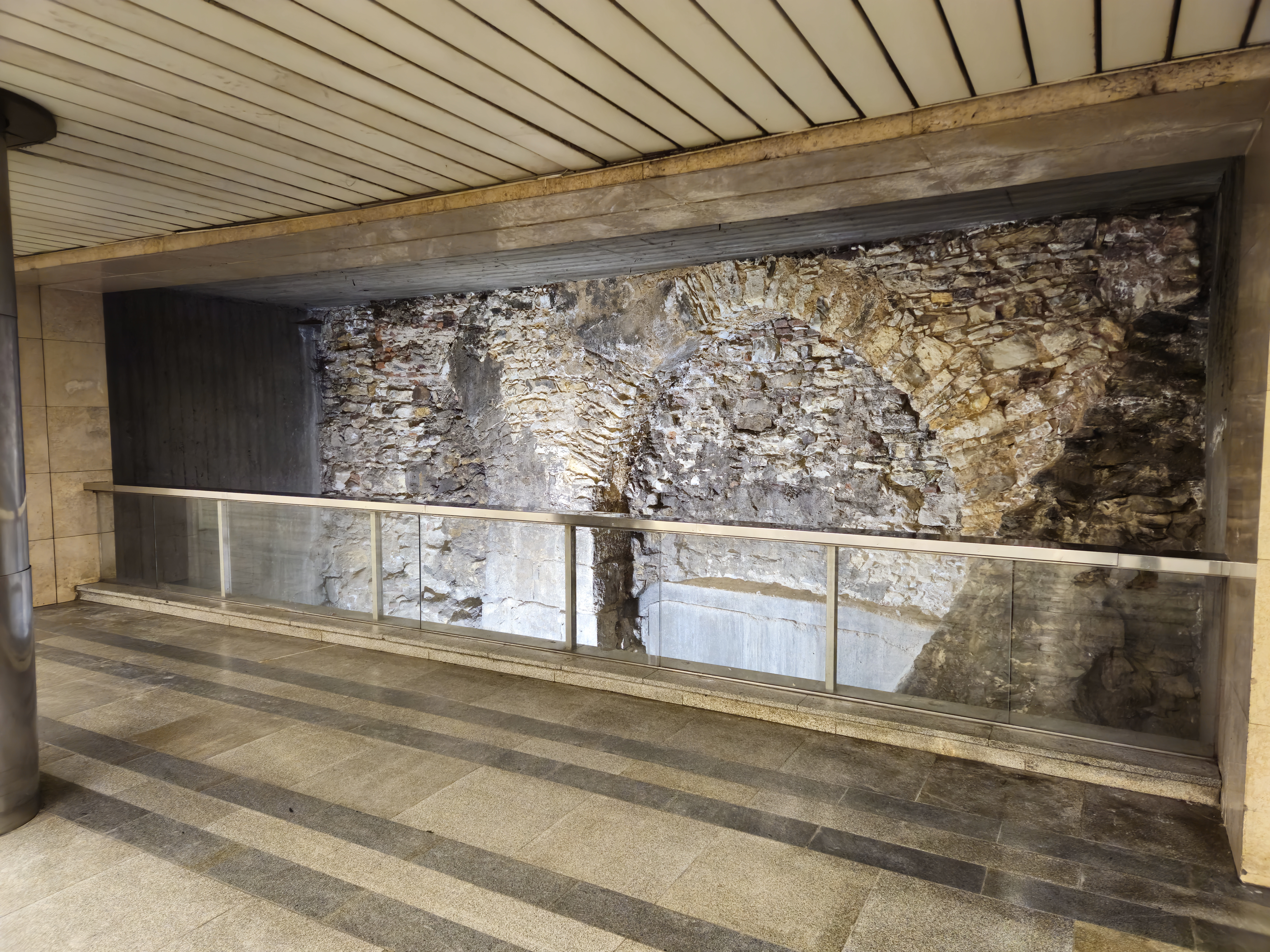
A medieval bridge in Můstek station

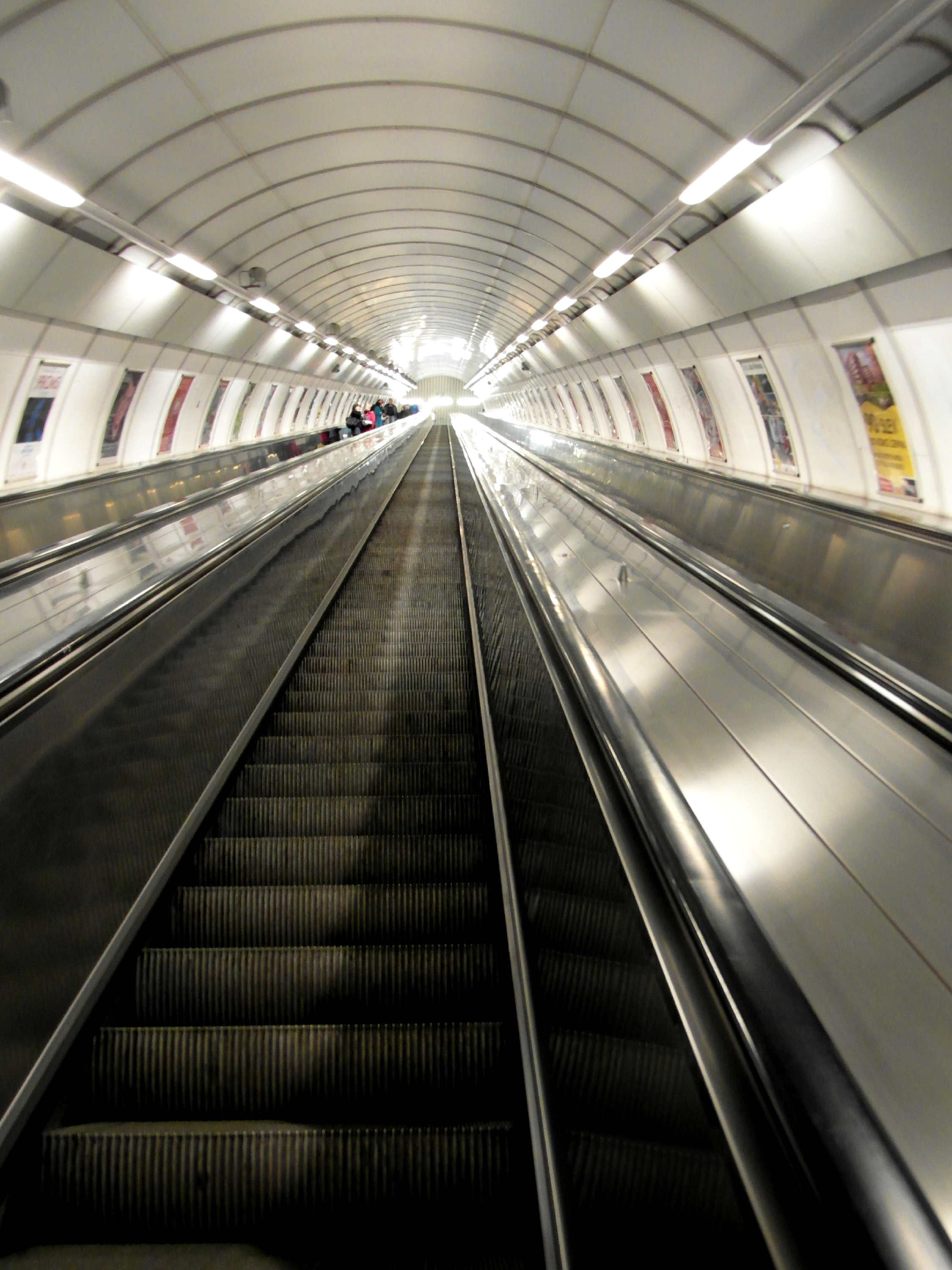
The longest escalator in the EU at Náměstí Míru

The name of the Můstek station means "little bridge" and refers to the area around the station. The origin of the area's name was not known until remains of a medieval bridge were discovered during construction of the station. The remains were incorporated into the station and can be seen near the northwestern exit of the station.

The escalators at Náměstí Míru (Peace Square) station in Vinohrady are the longest escalators in the European Union (length 87 m, vertical span 43.5 m, 533 steps, taking 2 minutes and 15 seconds to ascend). Náměstí Míru is also the deepest station in the European Union, at 53 metres.

Between I. P. Pavlova and Vyšehrad stations, Line C runs inside the box structure of the large Nusle Bridge over a steep valley.

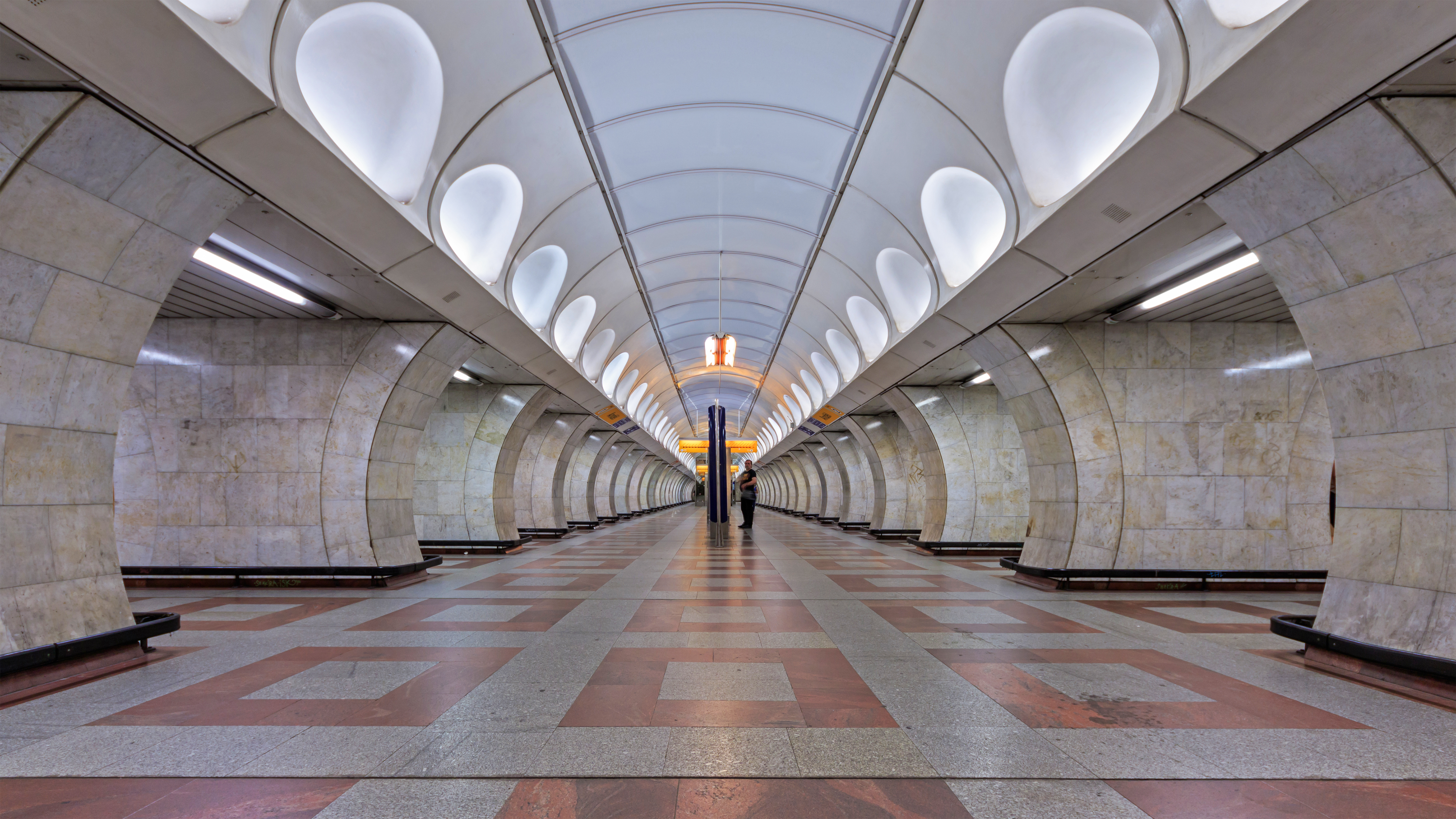
Anděl (Angel) station on Line B

The terminal station Depo Hostivař was constructed within the buildings of an existing railway depot. The extension is the first segment of the system to be built above ground and not through a tunnel. There are no reversing tracks in the terminus; trains depart from the same track on which they arrive.

Anděl station was known as Moskevská (Moscow station) until 1990. It opened on the same day in 1985 as the Prazhskaya (Prague) station on the Moscow Metro. It contains several pieces of art promoting Soviet-Czechoslovak friendship. Anděl station, like the Praha-Smíchov railway station, contains some of the best-preserved examples of Communist-era art remaining in Prague. Works were carried out from 2014–15 to make the station accessible for wheelchair users.

=== Announcements ===
„Ukončete, prosím, výstup a nástup, dveře se zavírají. Příští stanice: Staroměstská." Line A, Můstek station.

The announcement made through the public address system when the doors are closing, "Ukončete, prosím, výstup a nástup, dveře se zavírají" ("Please finish exiting and boarding, the doors are closing") has become a symbol of Prague for many tourists, and is possibly the first clear Czech phrase many travellers hear. The announcement has changed little since 1974, when the first line was opened; the original version did not include the word "please". The announcements are voiced by Světlana Lavičková on Line A, by Eva Jurinová on Line B, and by Tomáš Černý on Line C.

Other announcements include: "Vystupujte vpravo ve směru jízdy" ("Exit on the right side in the direction of travel"), "Konečná stanice, prosíme, vystupte" ("Terminal station, please exit the train"), and "Přestup na linky S a další vlakové spoje" ("Transfer to S lines and other railway connections").

The entrance hall of the Hradčanská station still features the coat of arms of the Czechoslovak Socialist Republic and the motto Všechna moc v Československé socialistické republice patří pracujícímu lidu ("All the power in the Czechoslovak Socialist Republic belongs to the working people"), which were parts of the station's original socialist-realist design.

During the communist period, rumours circulated that large and palatial "survival chambers" were being built for high officials of the government in case of a nuclear attack. After the fall of communism such areas were shown indeed to exist, but on neither the scale nor the luxury envisioned.

== Tickets ==
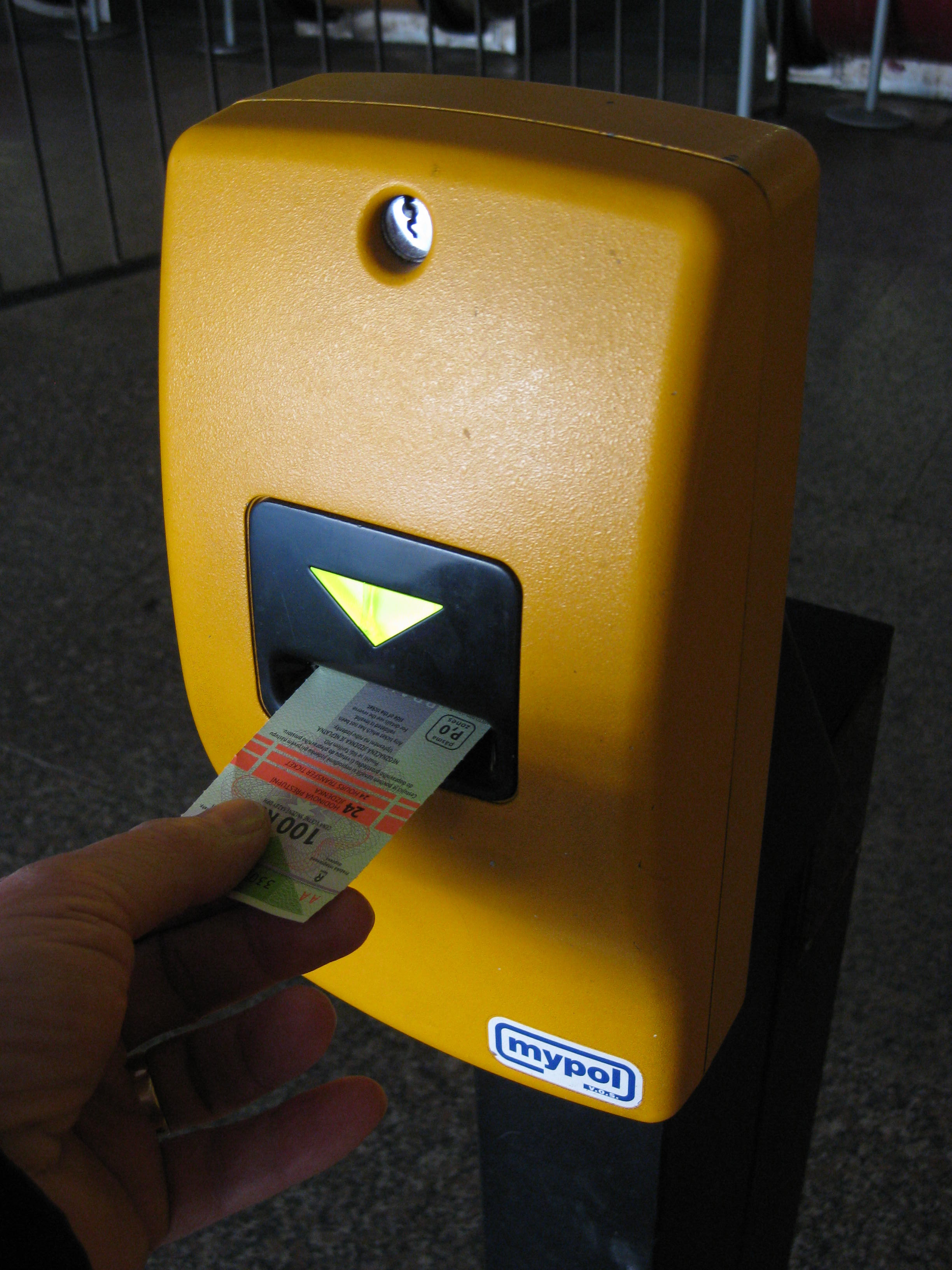
Validating a ticket using the date and time stamp machine

The Prague Metro operates on a proof-of-payment system, as does the rest of the PID network. Passengers must buy and validate a ticket before entering a station's paid area. There are uniformed and plainclothes fare inspectors who randomly check passengers' tickets within the paid area.

As of 1 January 2026, basic single tickets valid for 90 minutes cost 46 CZK (or 50 CZK for a paper ticket). Shorter-term single tickets valid for 30 minutes are sold for 36 CZK (39 CZK paper). In November 2007 SMS purchase for basic single transfer tickets and day tickets was introduced (available only from Czech mobile phones).

Short-term tourist passes are available for periods of 24 hours (140 CZK/150 CZK paper) and 3 days (340 CZK/350 CZK paper). As of 2019, single tickets and short term passes can be purchased online using the PID Lítačka smartphone app. Since April 2019 single and 24hour tickets can be also bought on board of every tram and in all metro stations, using contactless payment, including payment apps like Google Pay or Apple Pay. Such tickets are already validated from the time of purchase.

In efforts to get riders to use the "PID Lítačka" smartphone app, a new surcharge was implemented in January 2026 which applies to all paper and SMS tickets.

Longer-term season tickets can be bought on the smart ticketing system Lítačka card, for periods of one month (550 CZK), three months (1480 CZK) or the annual pass for 3650 CZK (10 CZK/day). Students studying in the Czech republic with a valid student license ISIC, children under 18 years old, and seniors over 60 years of age can buy season tickets at reduced prices. Reduced ticket prices are: 130 CZK for 30 days, 360 CZK for 90 days, and 1280 CZK for a year.

Senior citizens aged 65 or older and children up to 14 years old can ride for free. The tickets are the same for all means of transport in Prague (metro, trams, buses, funiculars and ferries).

== Gallery ==
=== Examples of stations on Line A ===
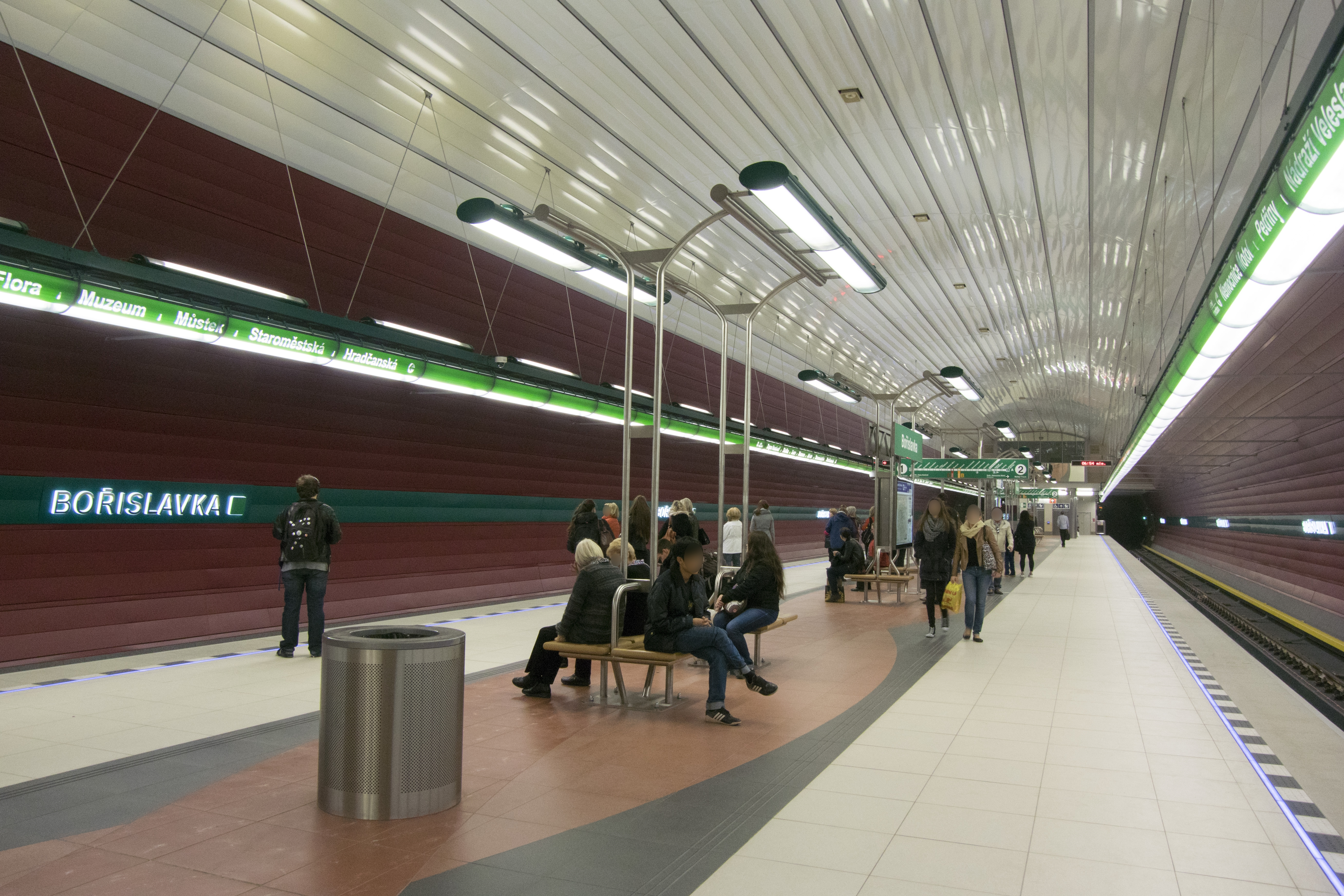
Bořislavka station

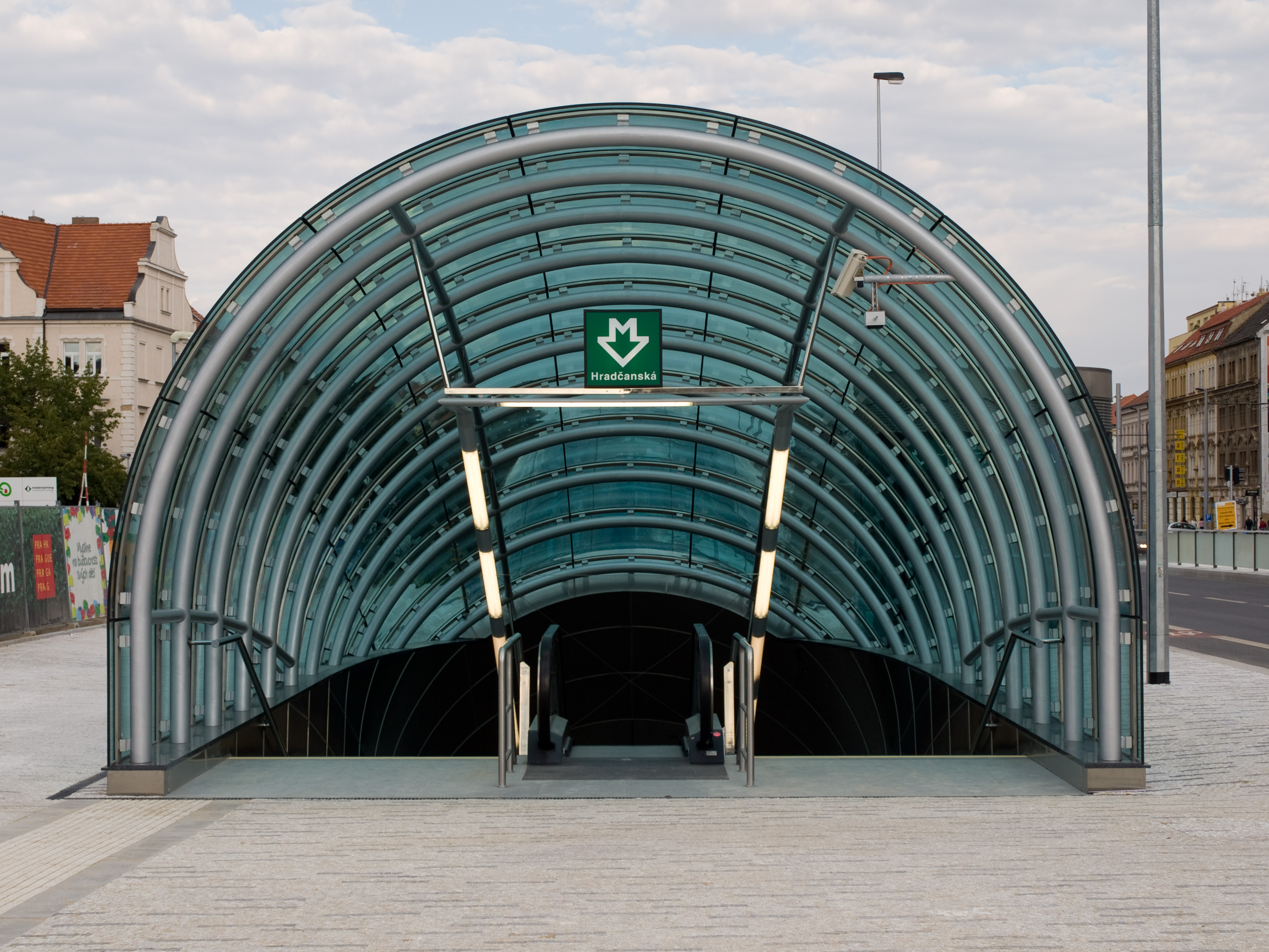
New entrance to Hradčanská station

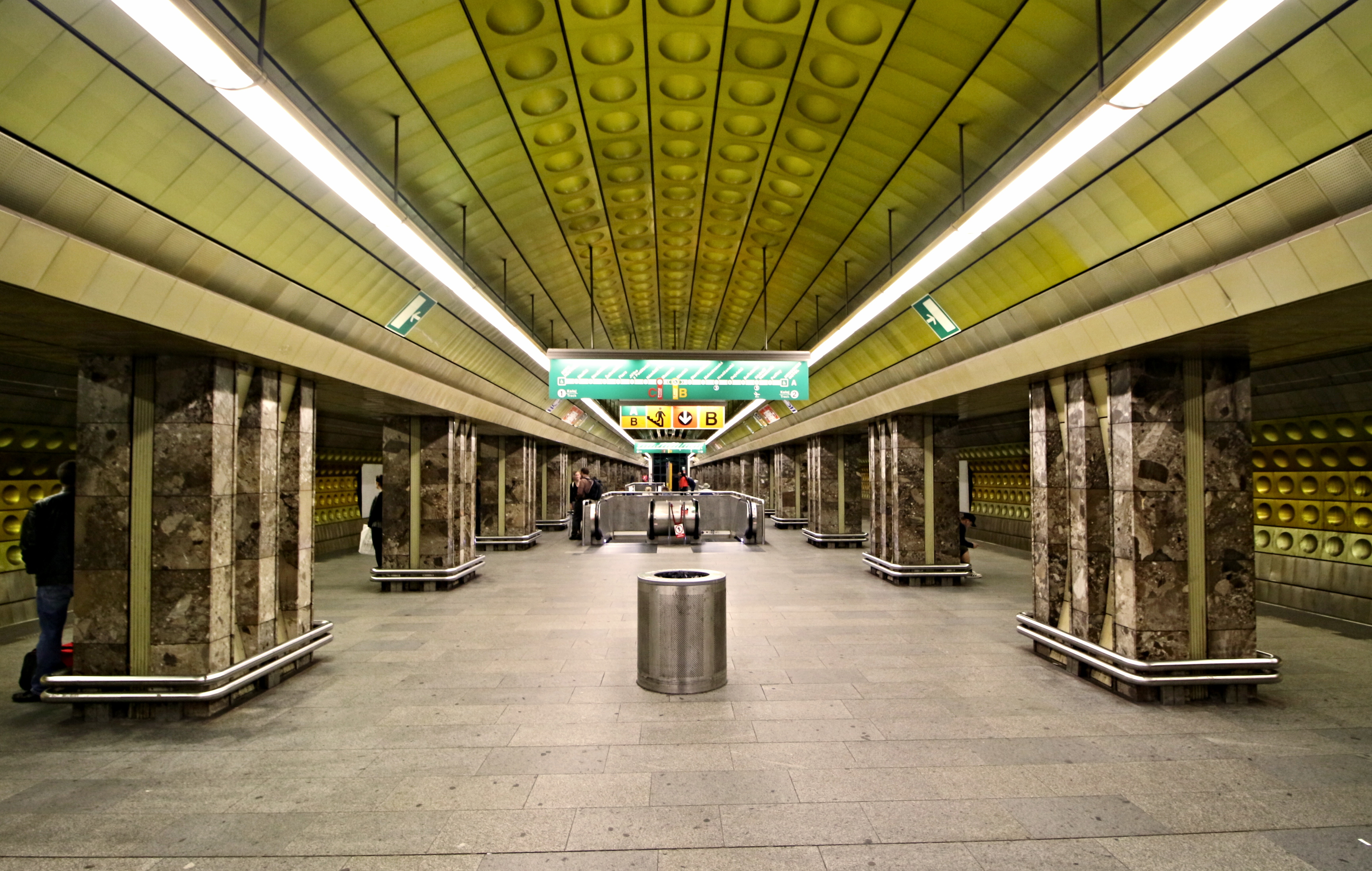
Můstek station

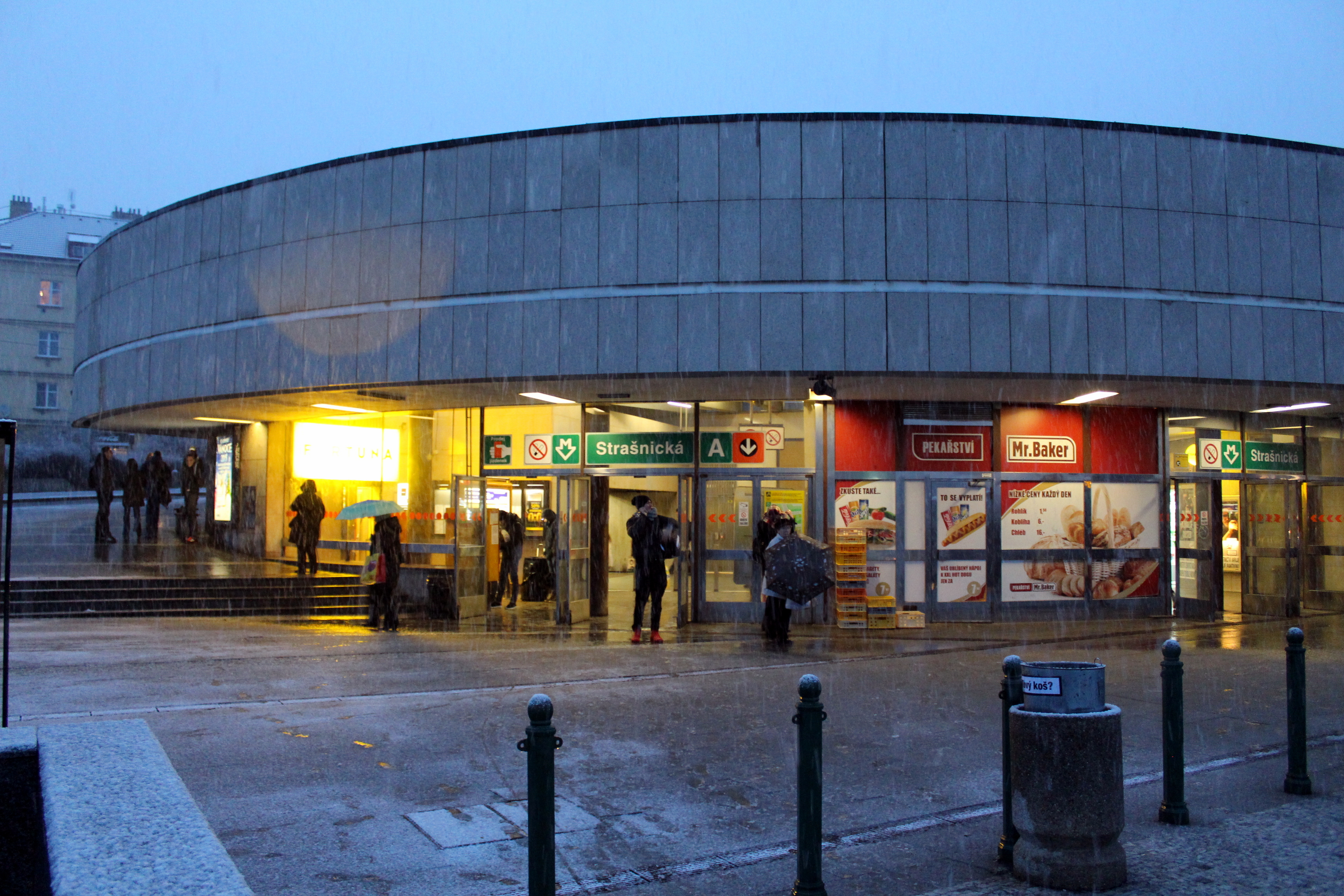
Entrance to Strašnická station

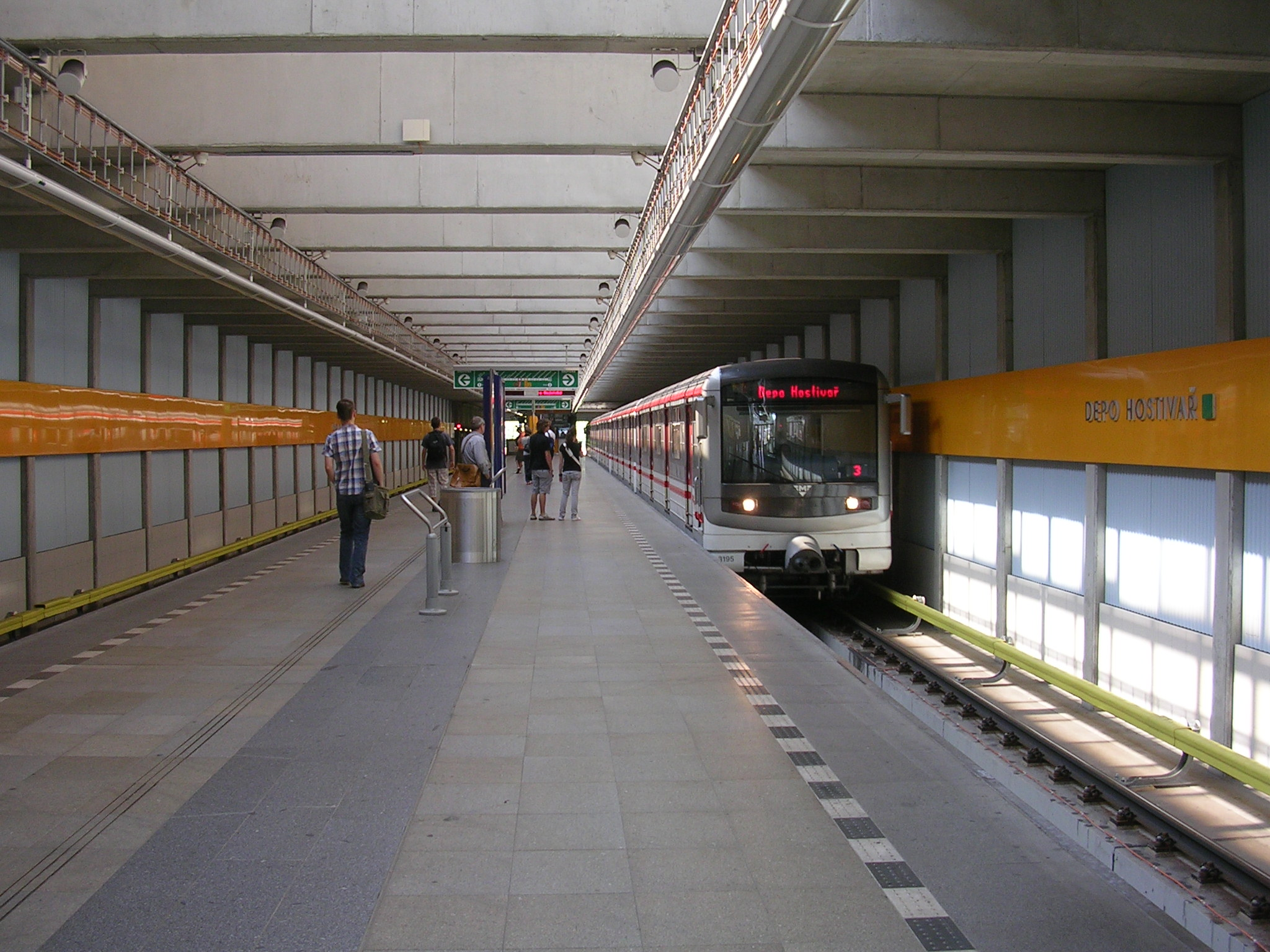
Depo Hostivař station

=== Examples of stations on Line B ===
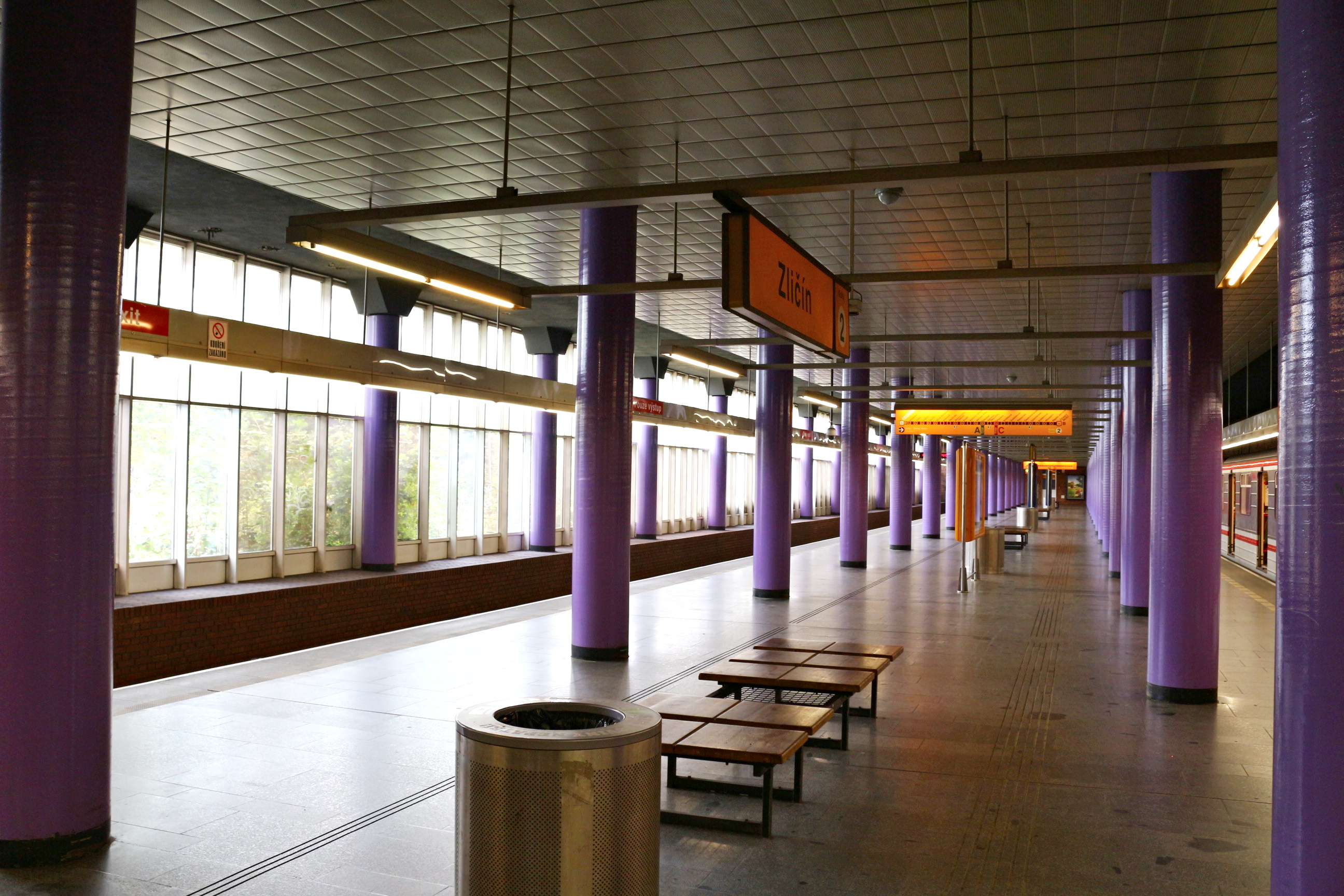
Zličín station

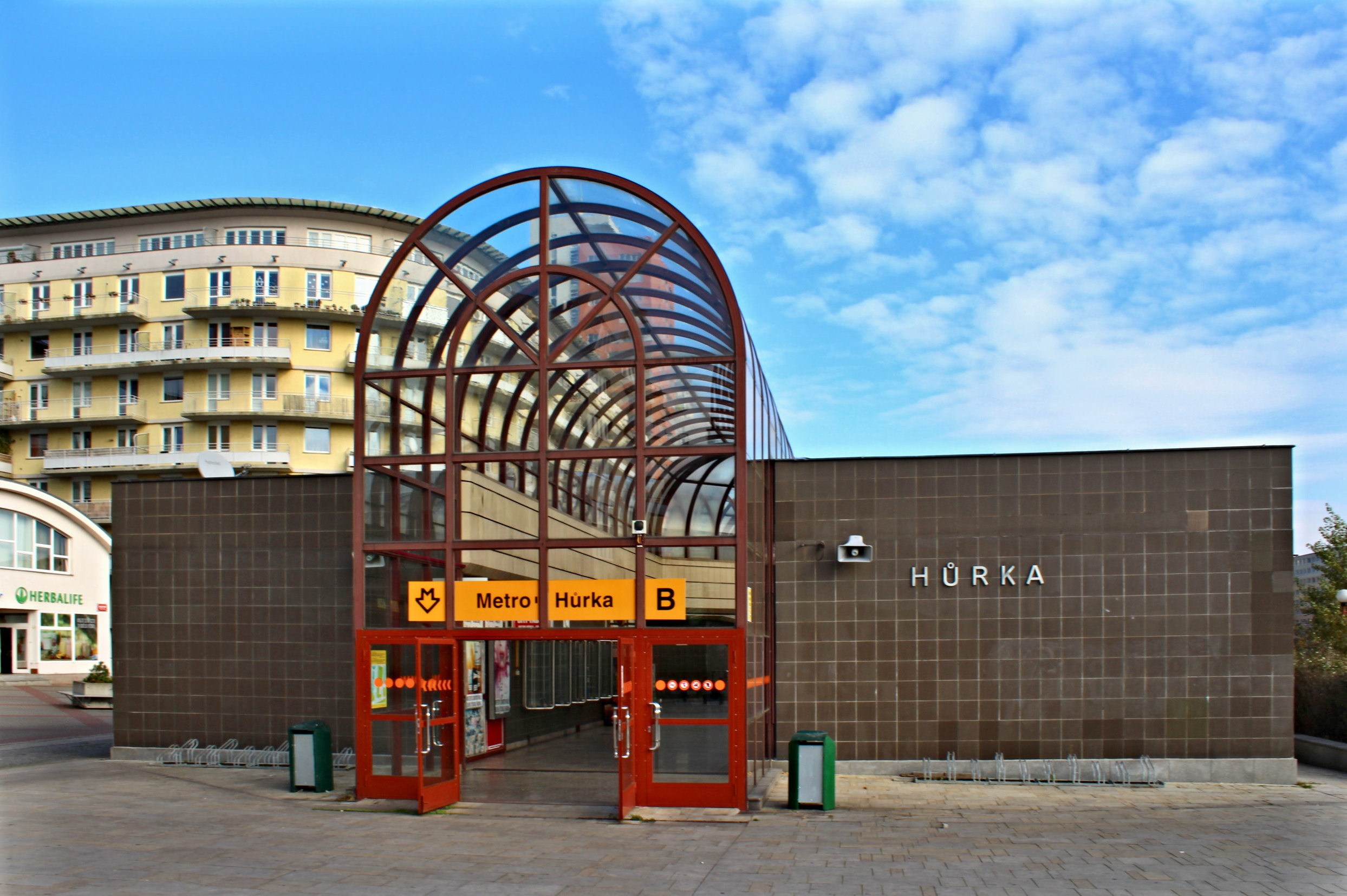
Hůrka station

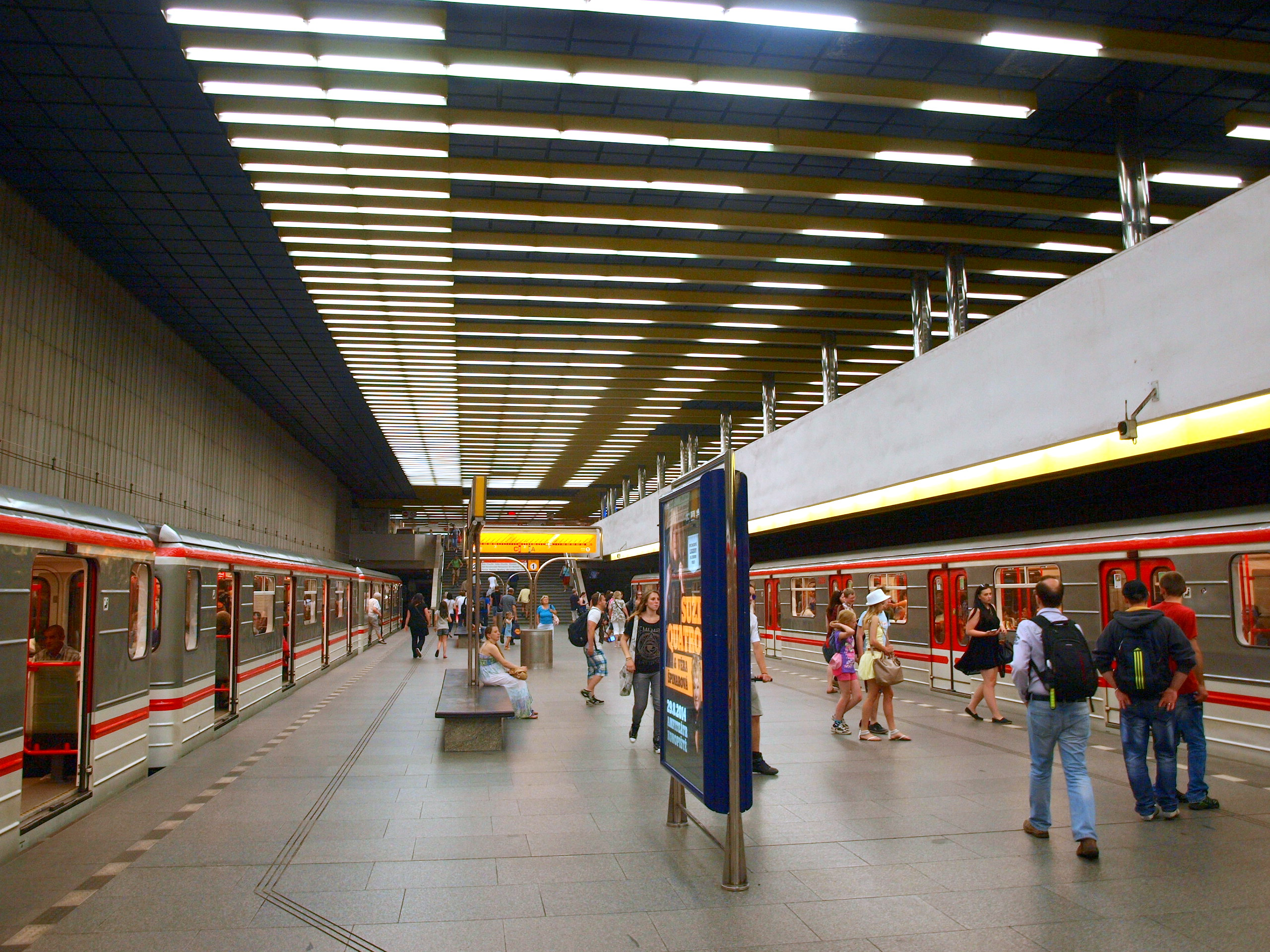
Metro platforms at Smíchovské nádraží

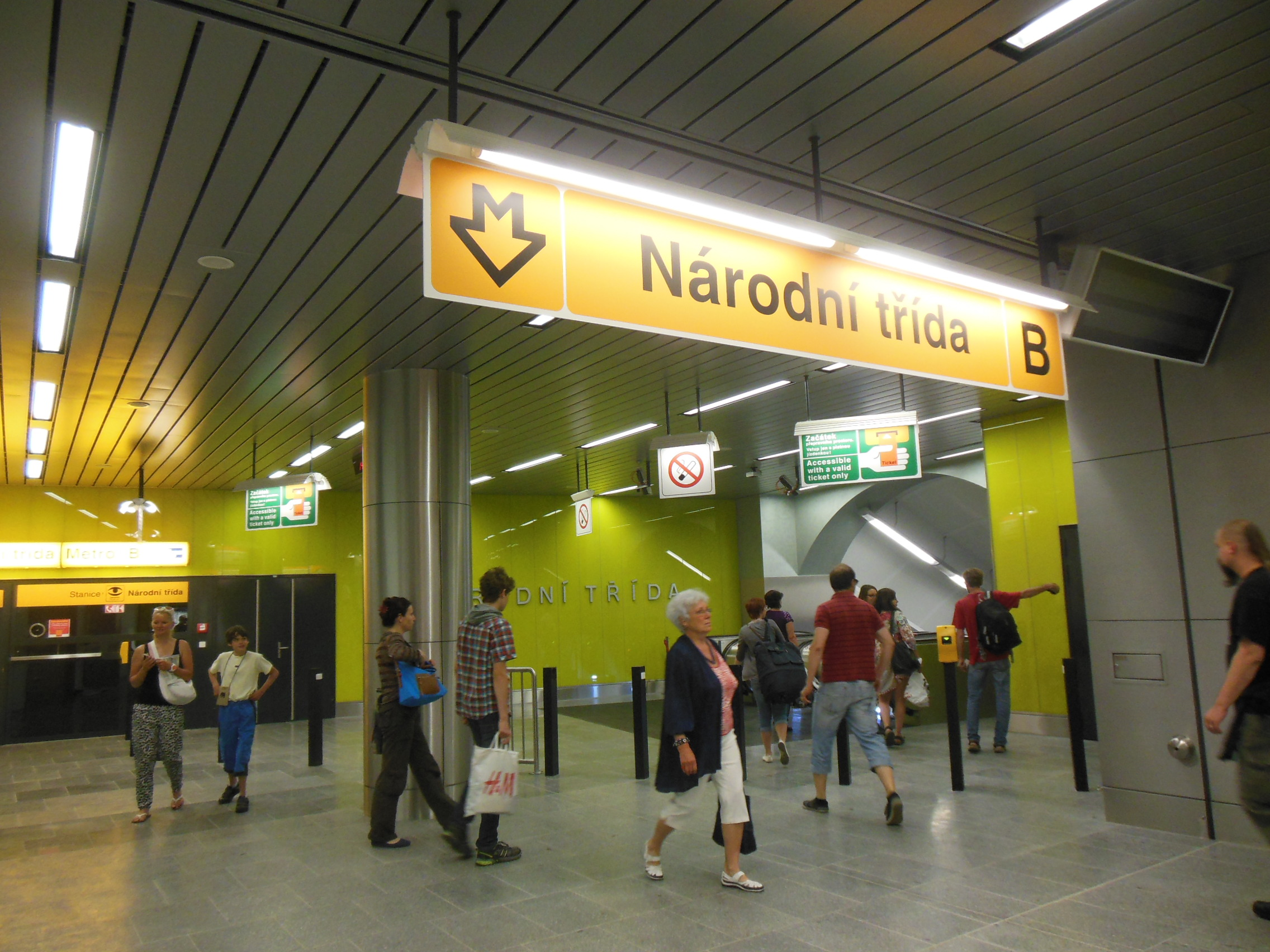
Entrance to Národní třída station

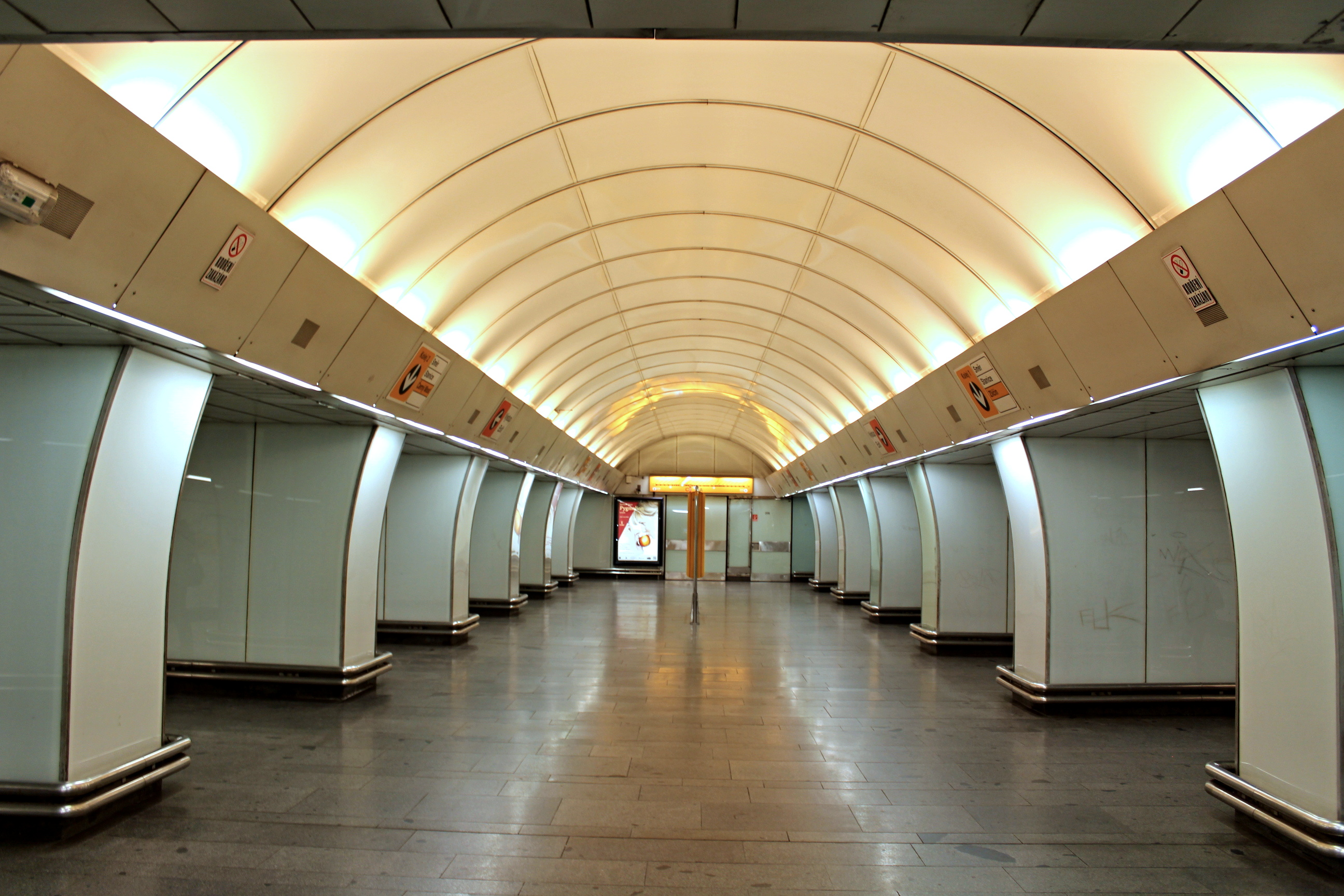
Invalidovna station

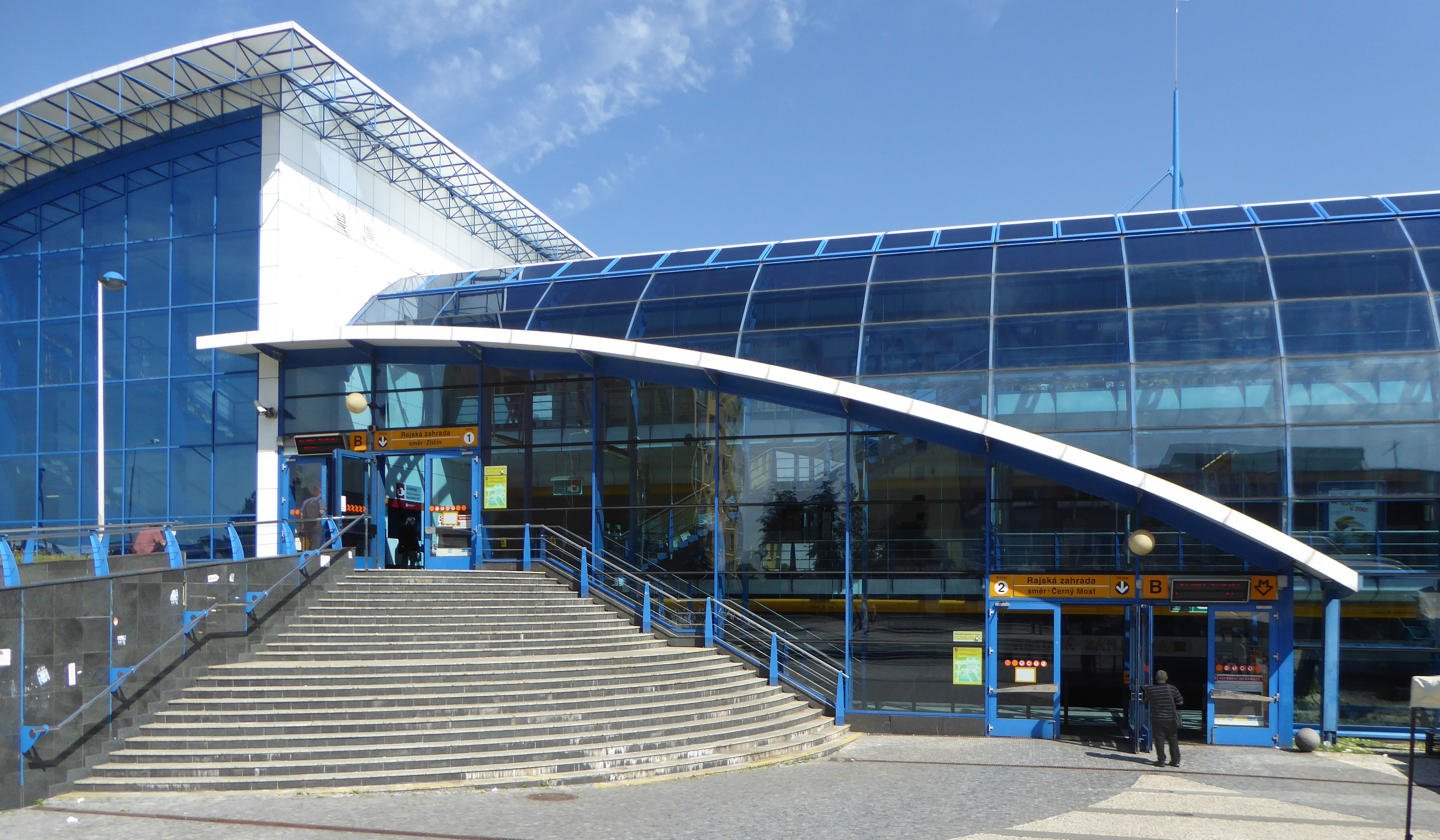
Rajská zahrada station

=== Examples of stations on Line C ===
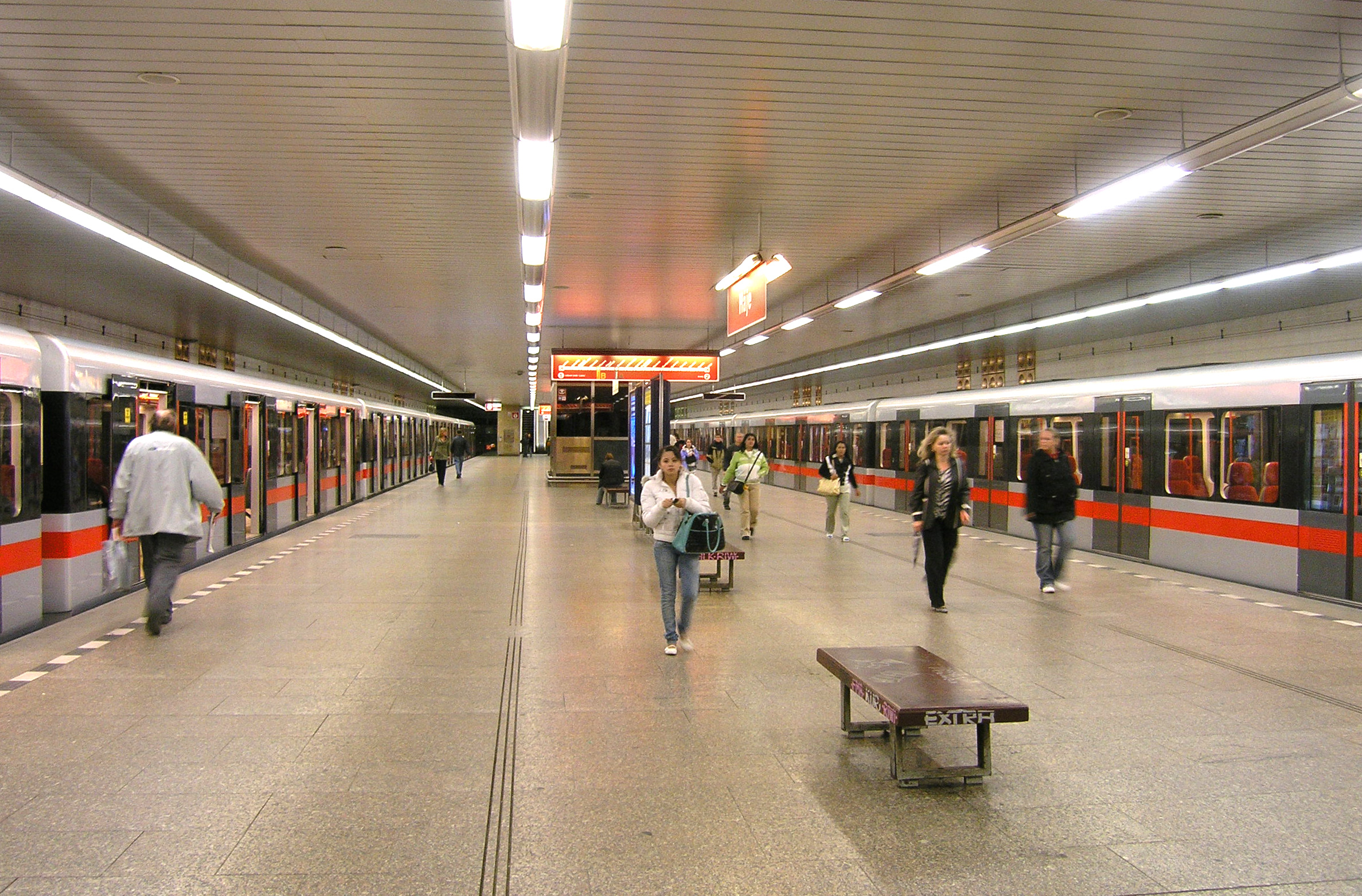
Háje station

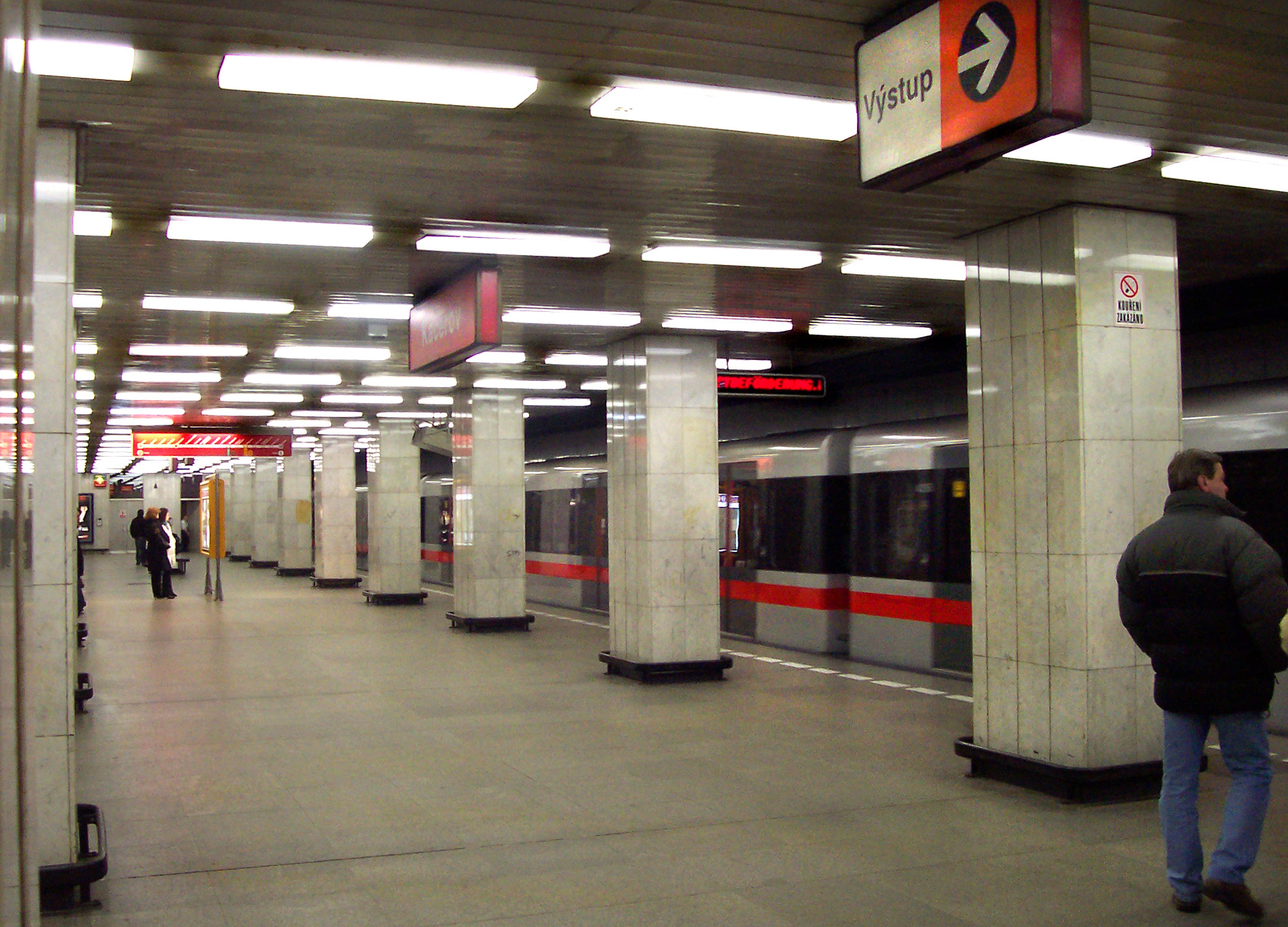
Kačerov station

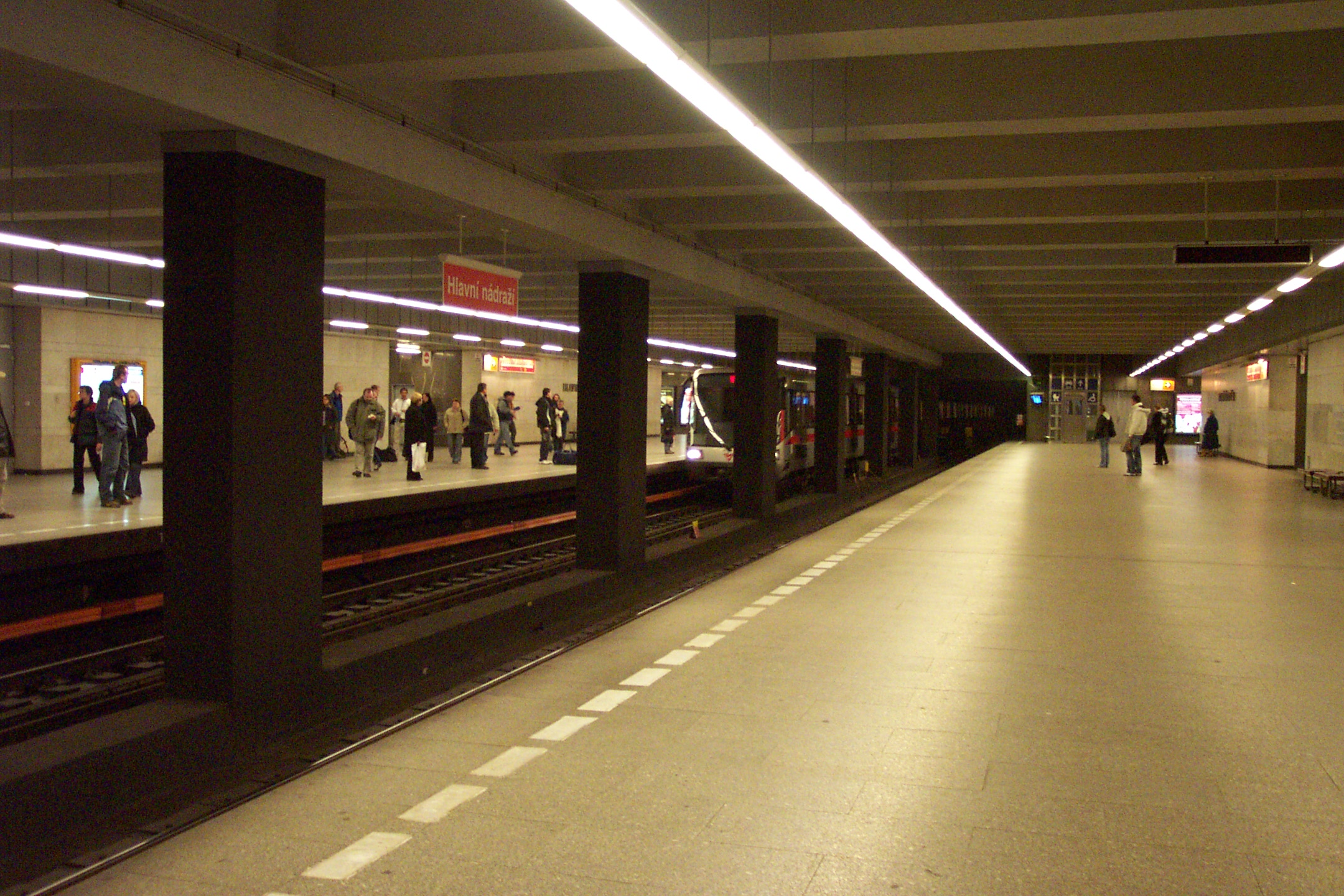
Metro platforms at Hlavní nádraží (Central Railway Station)

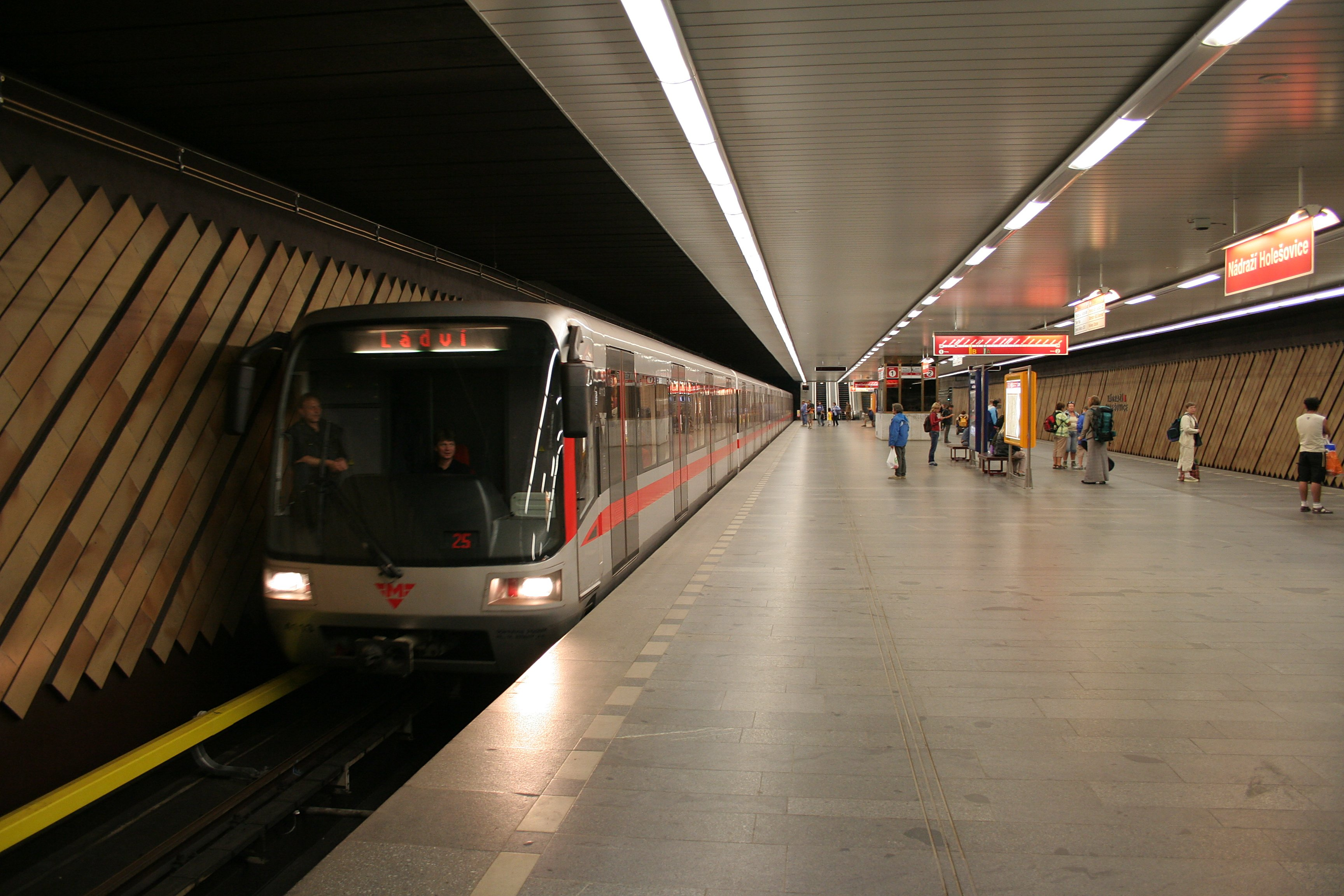
Metro platforms at Nádraží Holešovice

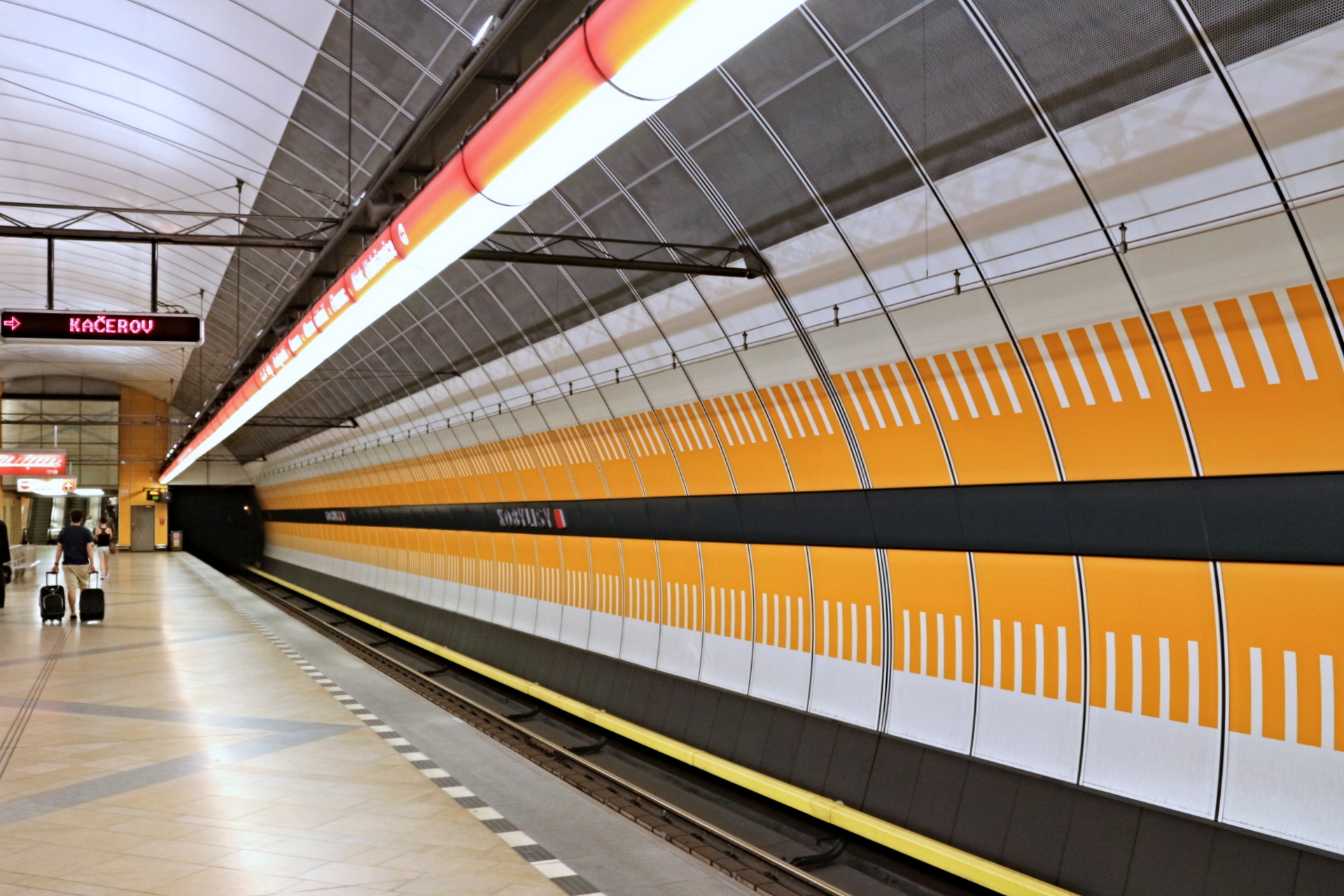
Kobylisy station

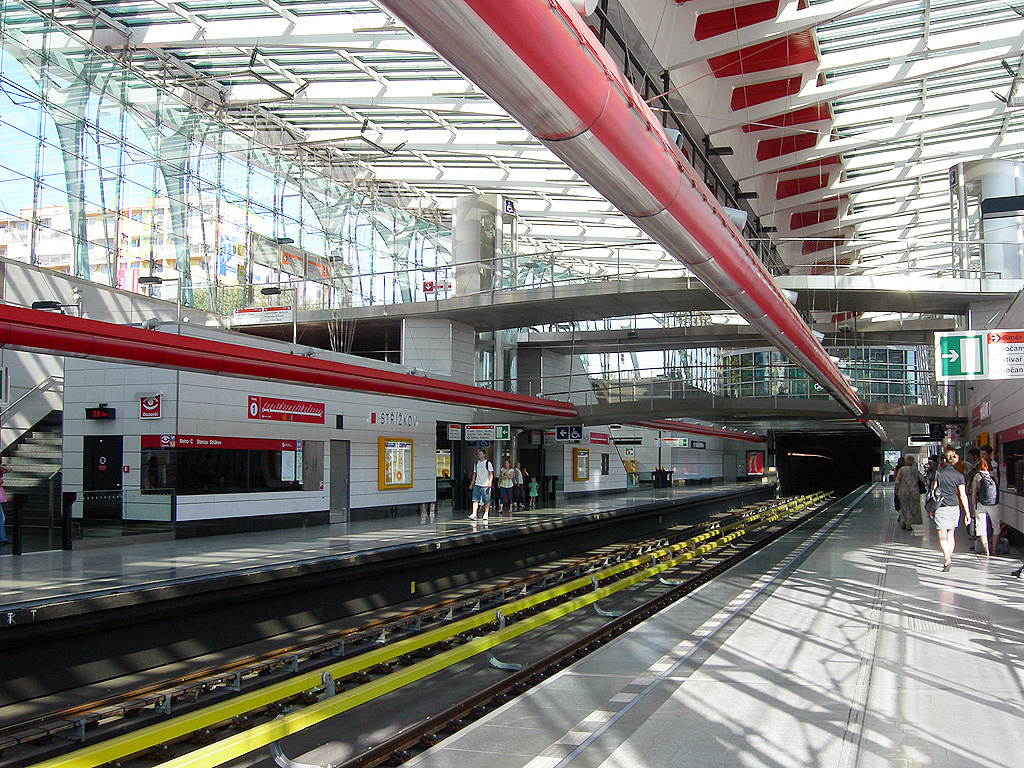
Střížkov station

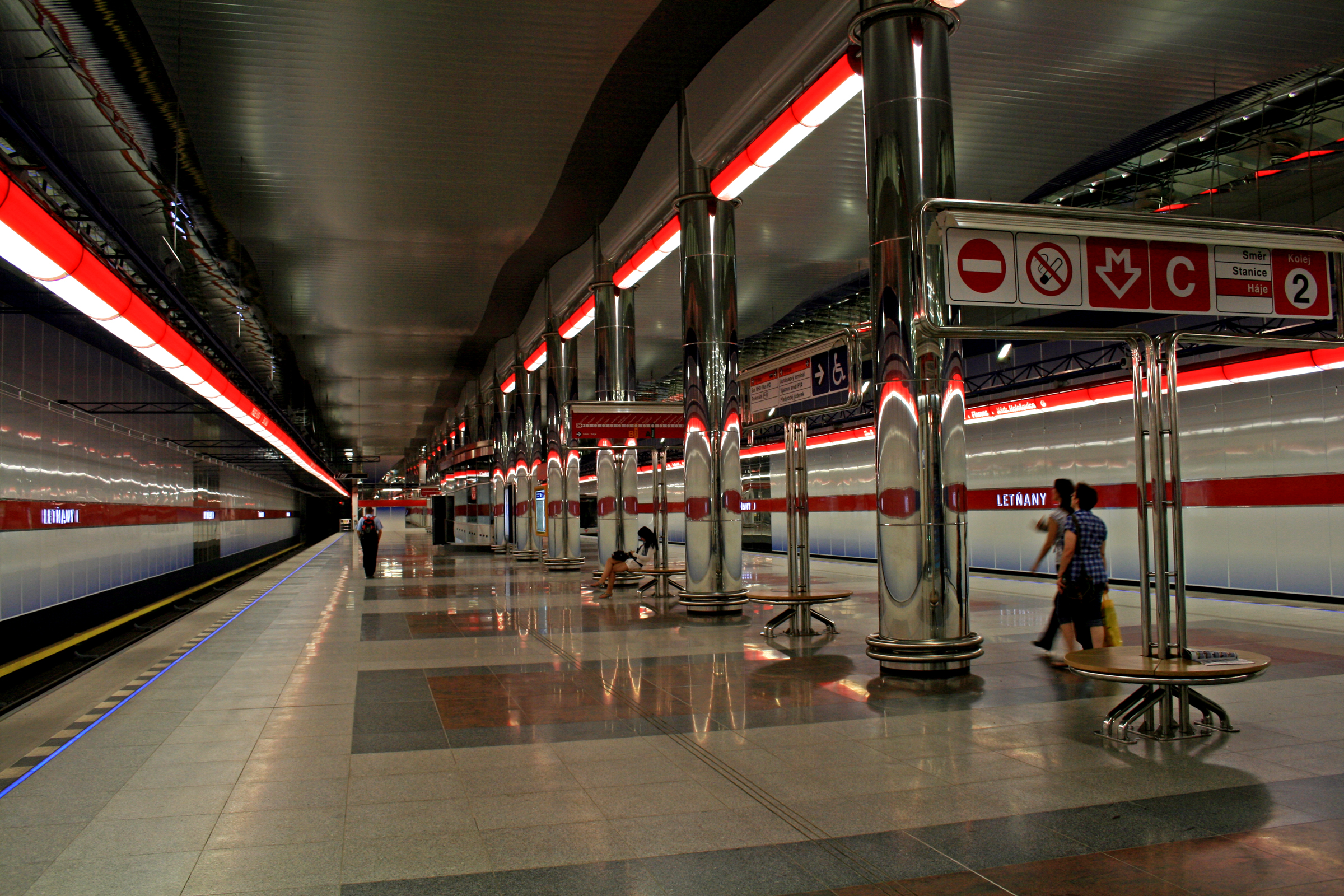
Letňany station

=== Transfer corridors ===
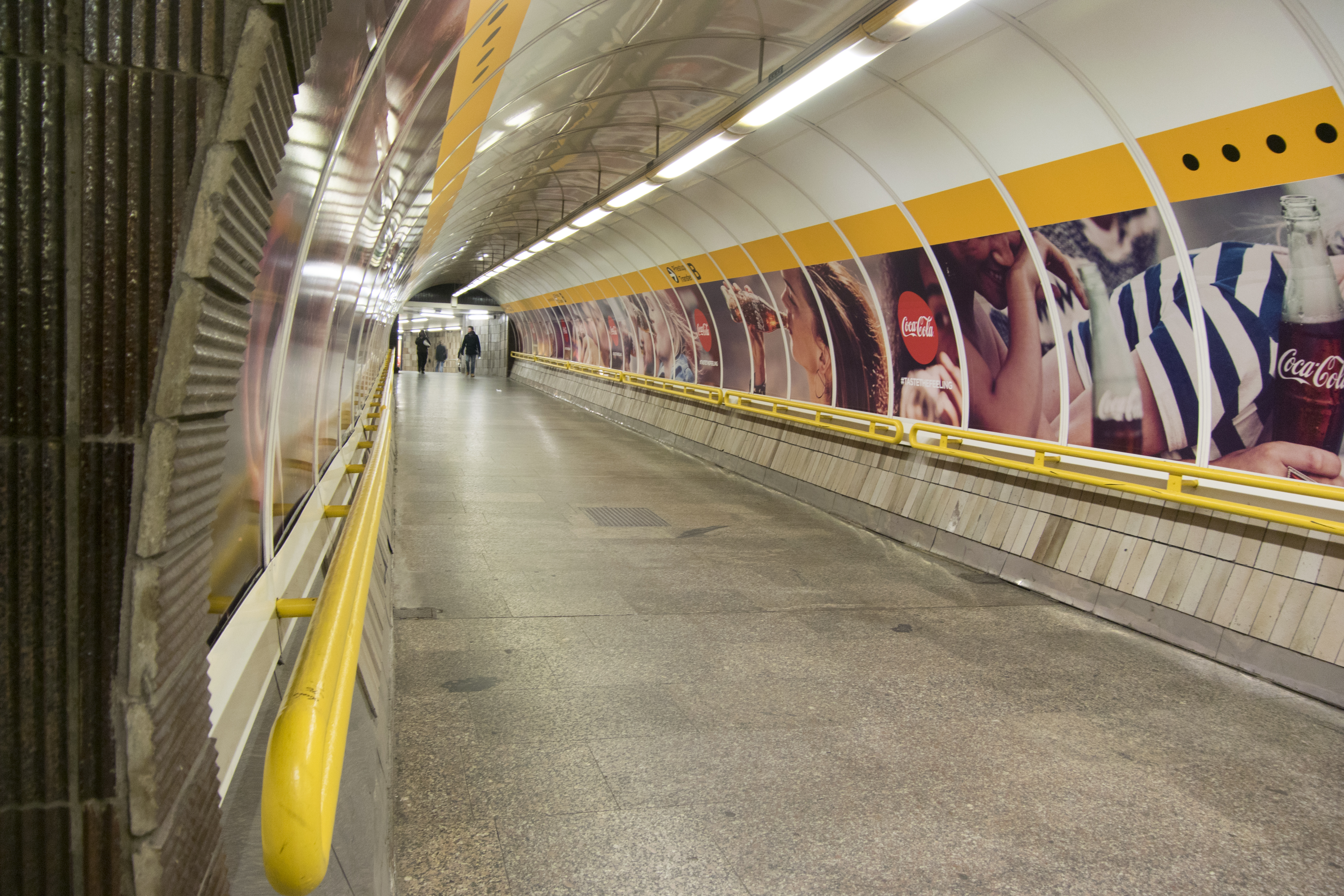
Transfer corridor in Florenc

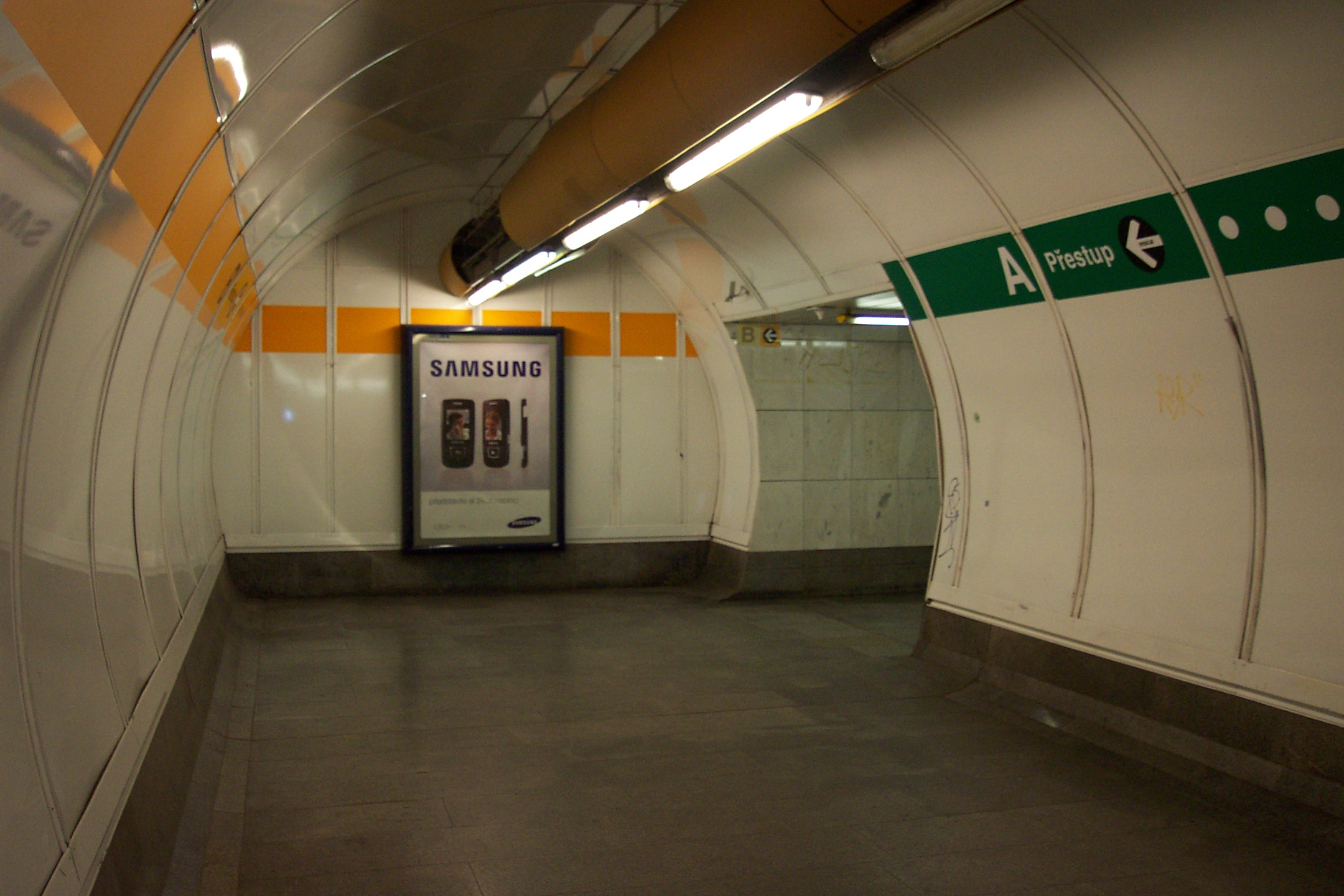
Transfer corridor in station Můstek

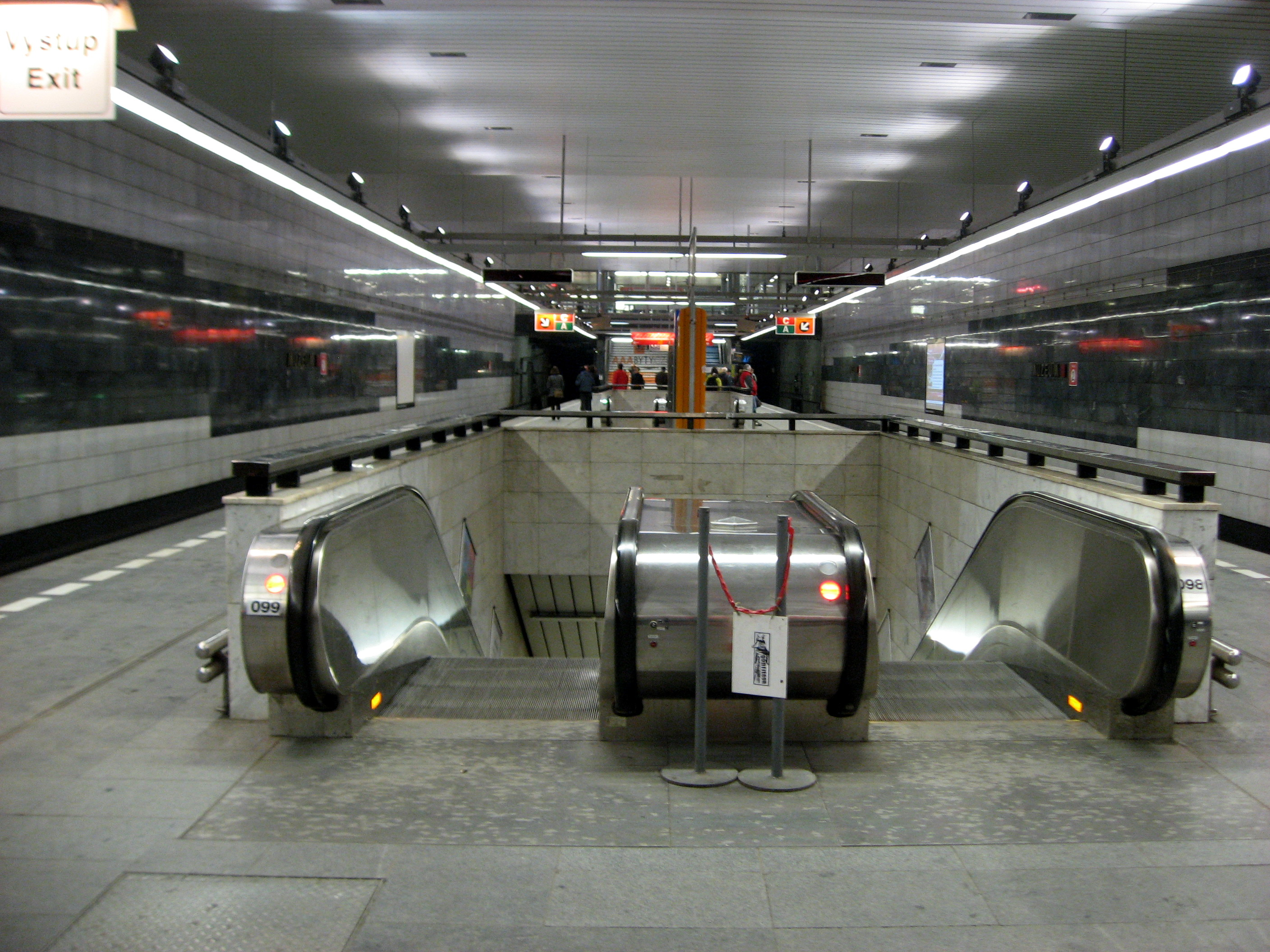
Entrance to the transfer corridor in the station Muzeum

=== Current subway cars ===
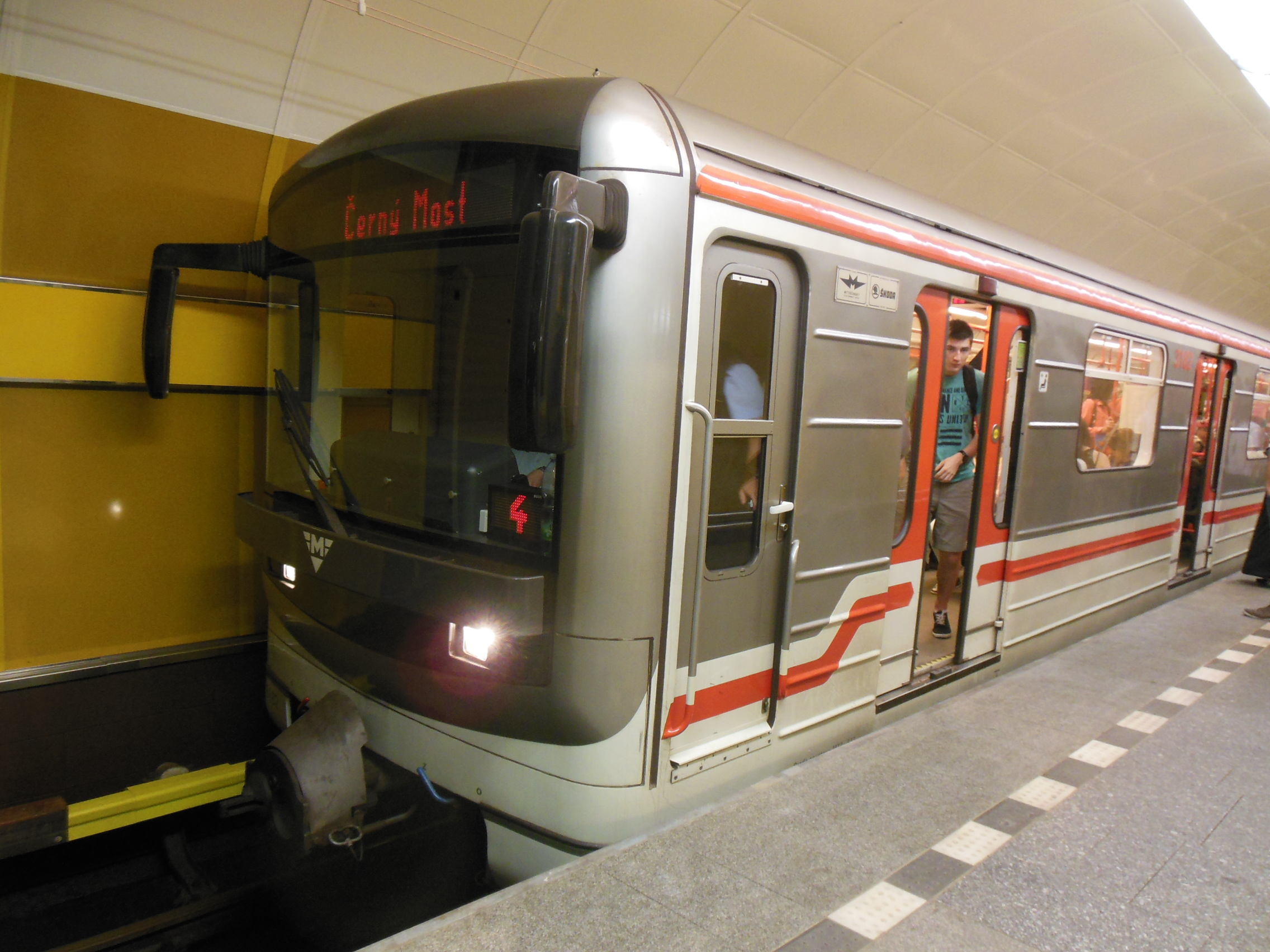
81-71M, originally a subway car made in the USSR, reconstructed in Czech Škoda Transportation

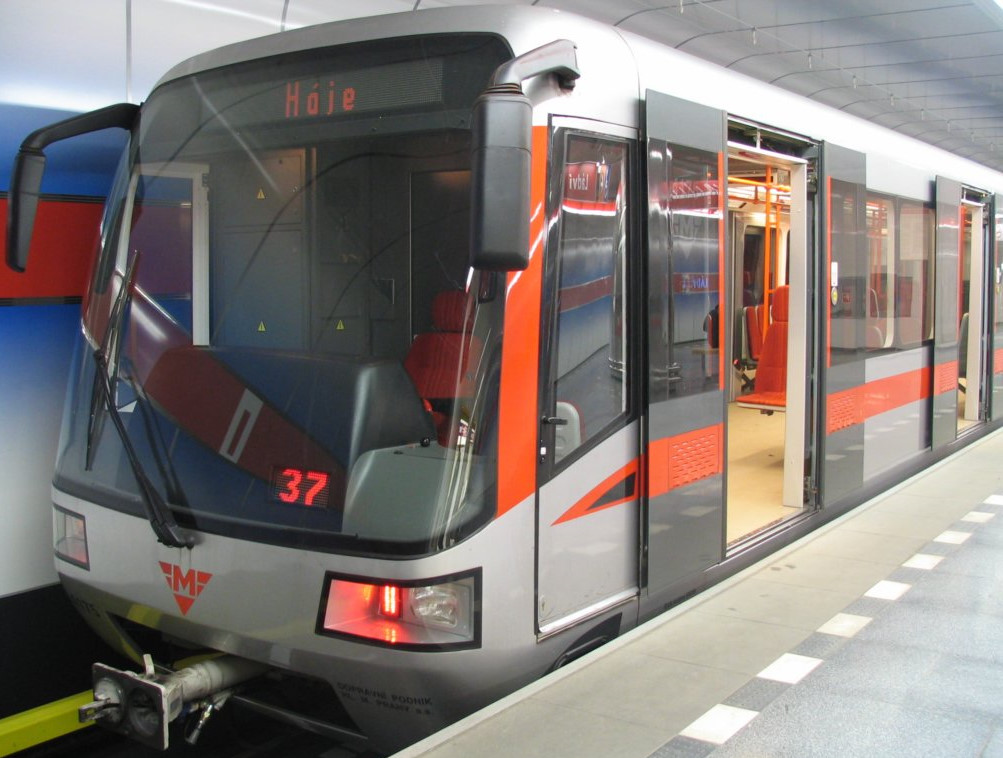
M1, made in Siemens and ČKD

=== Historic subway cars ===
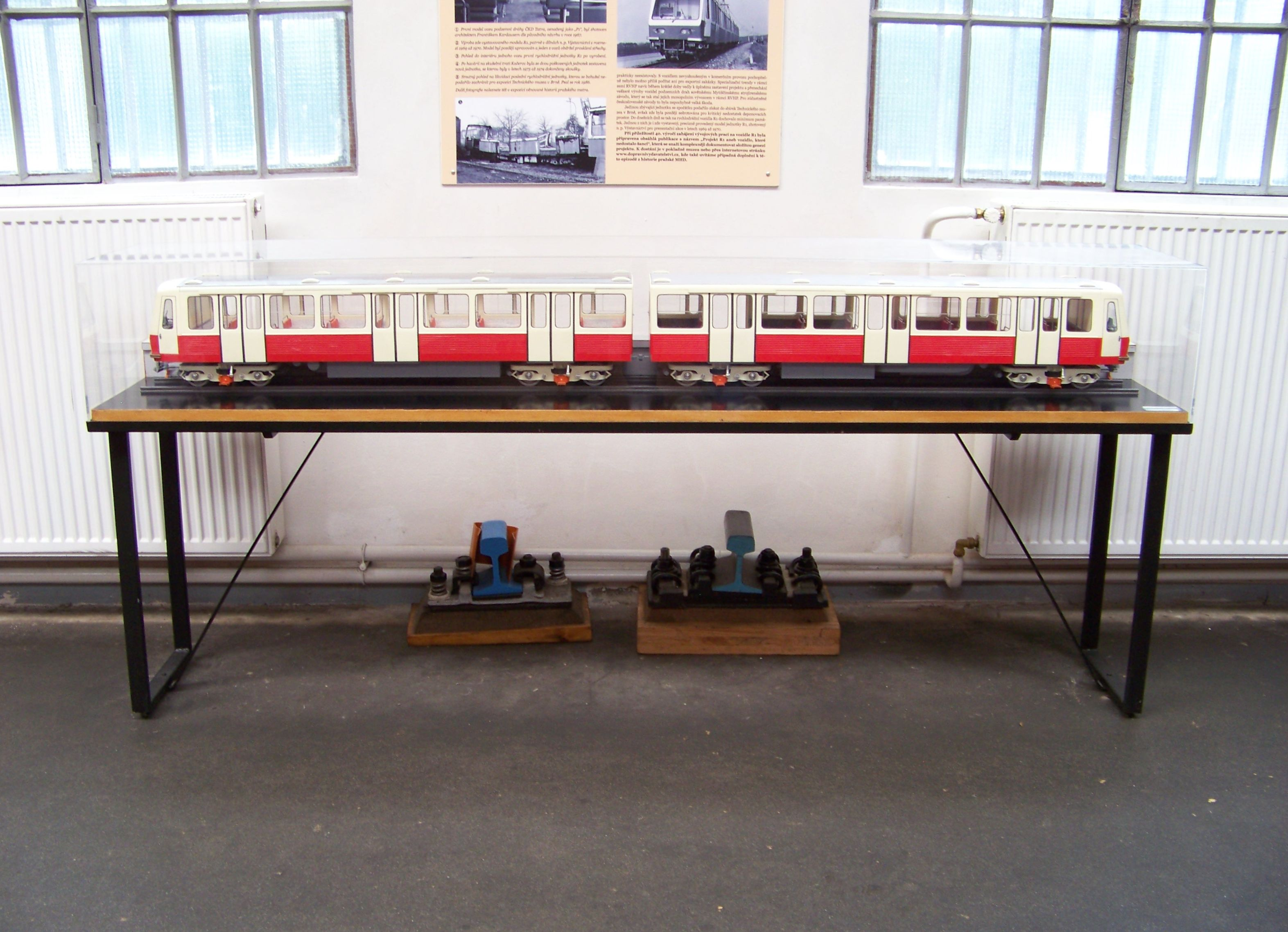
Prototype R1 made in ČKD Tatra (never in official operation)

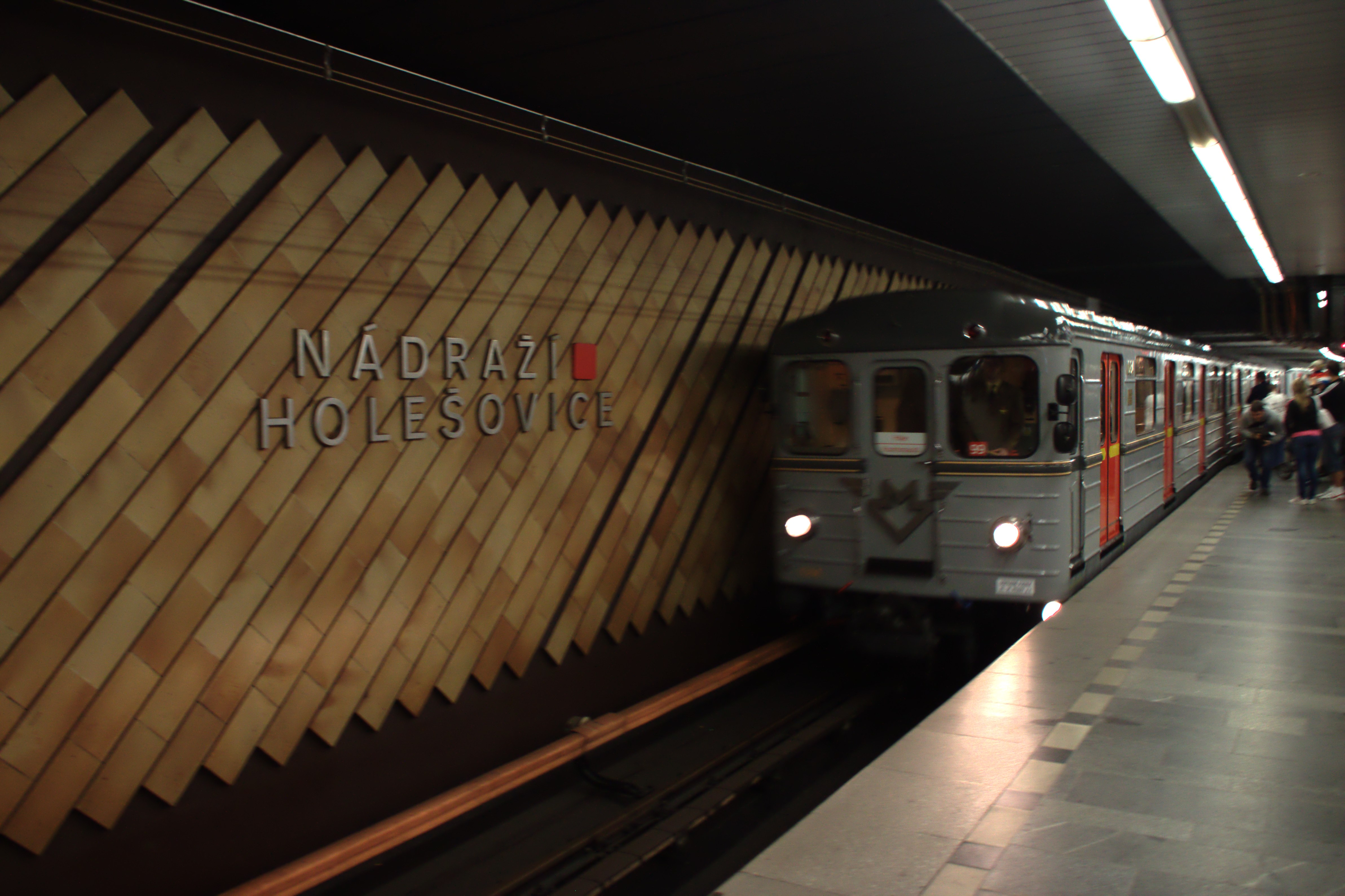
Metrovagonmash Ečs, in operation in 1974–1997

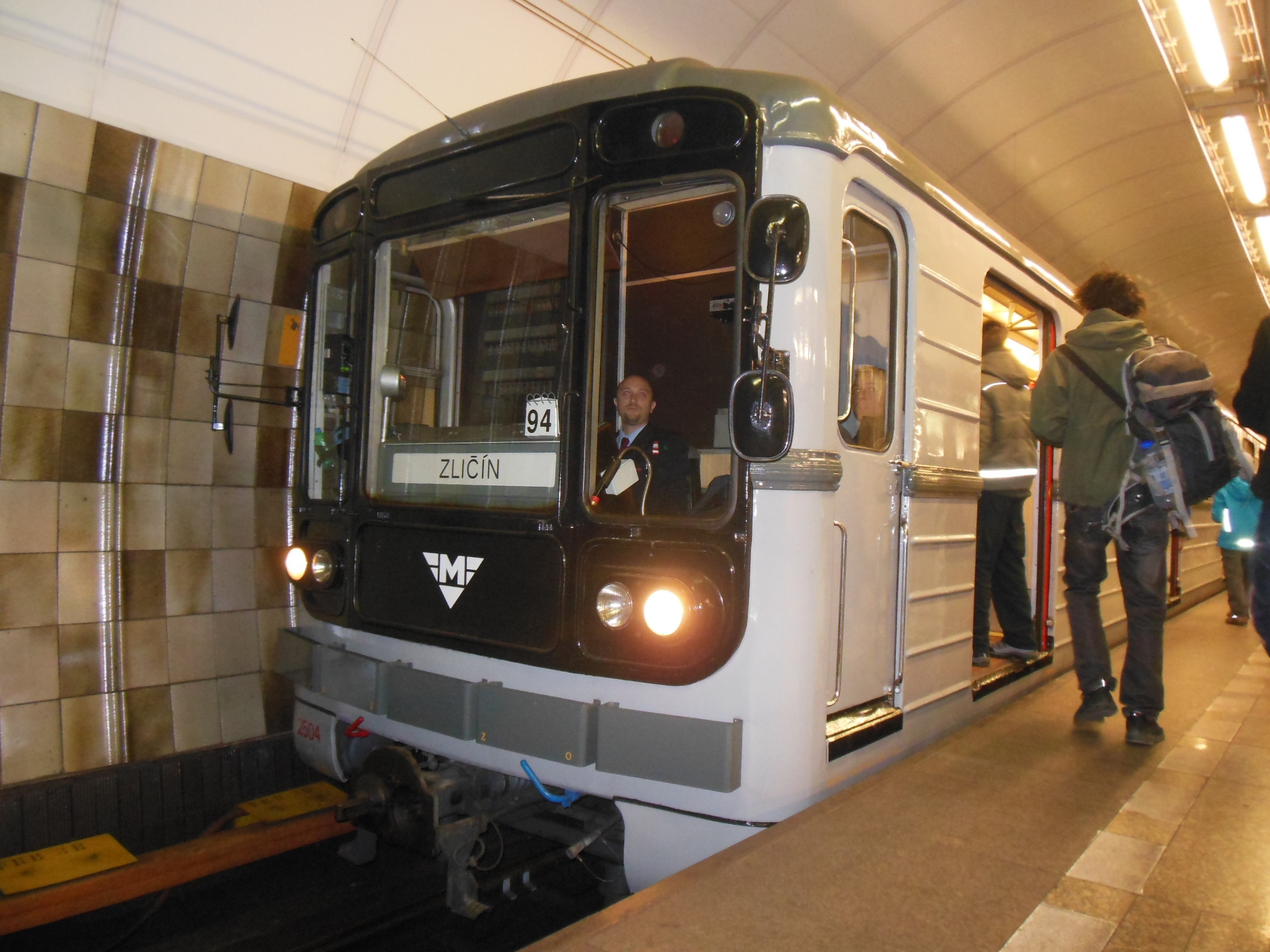
81-71 (81-717.1/714.1), in operation 1978–2009

=== Related constructions ===
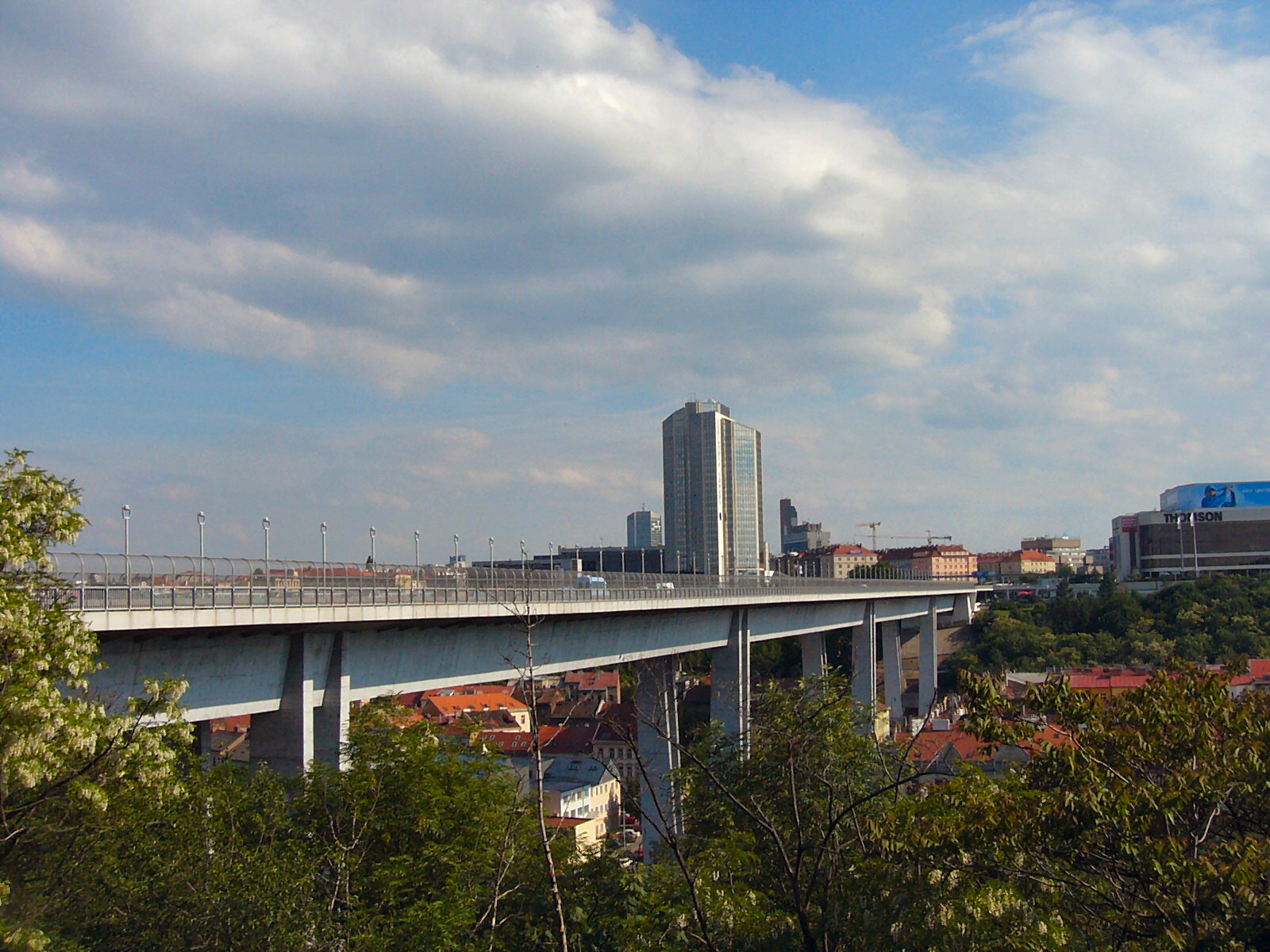
Nuselský most (Nusle bridge)

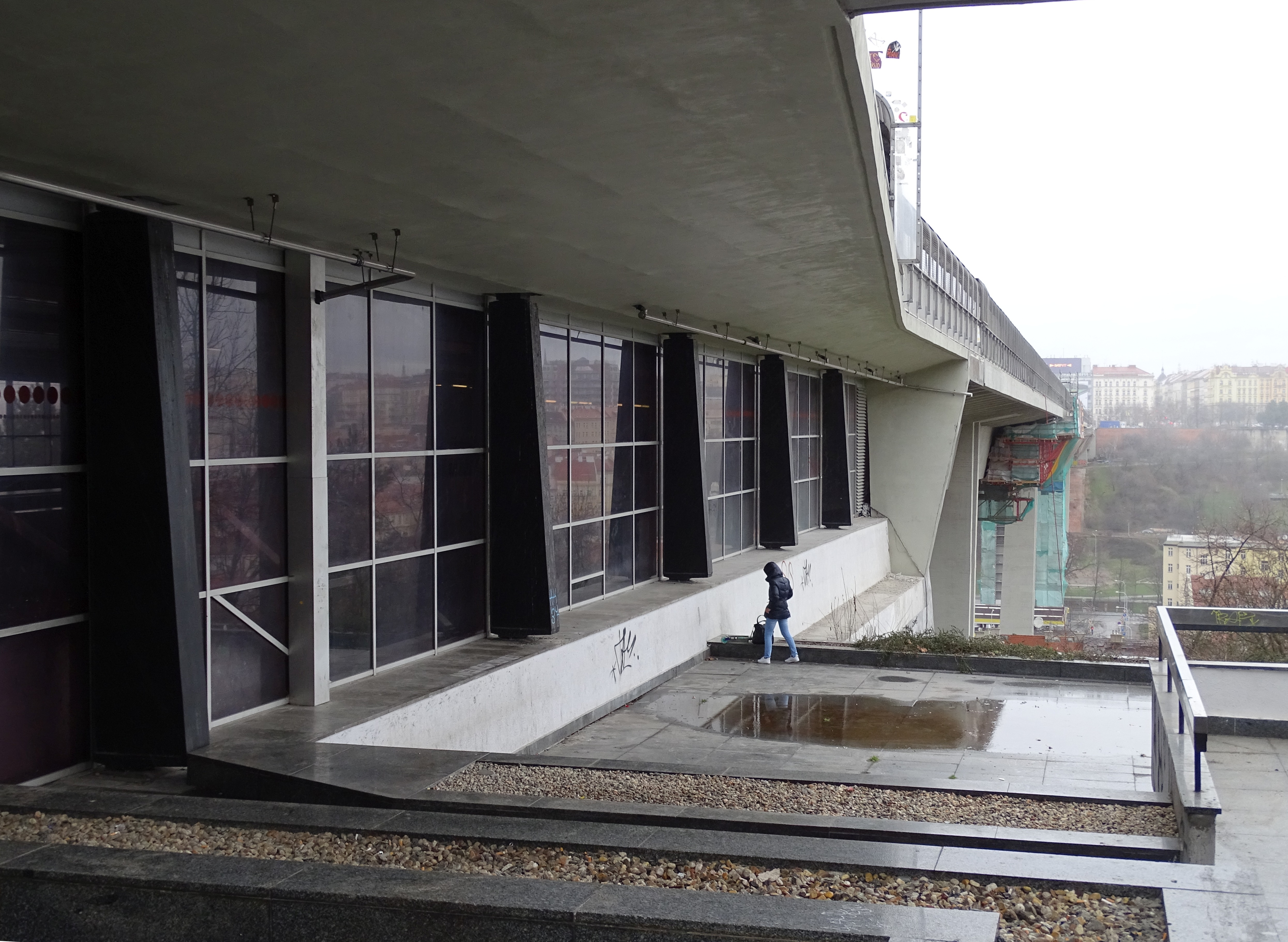
Station Vyšehrad under the Nusle bridge

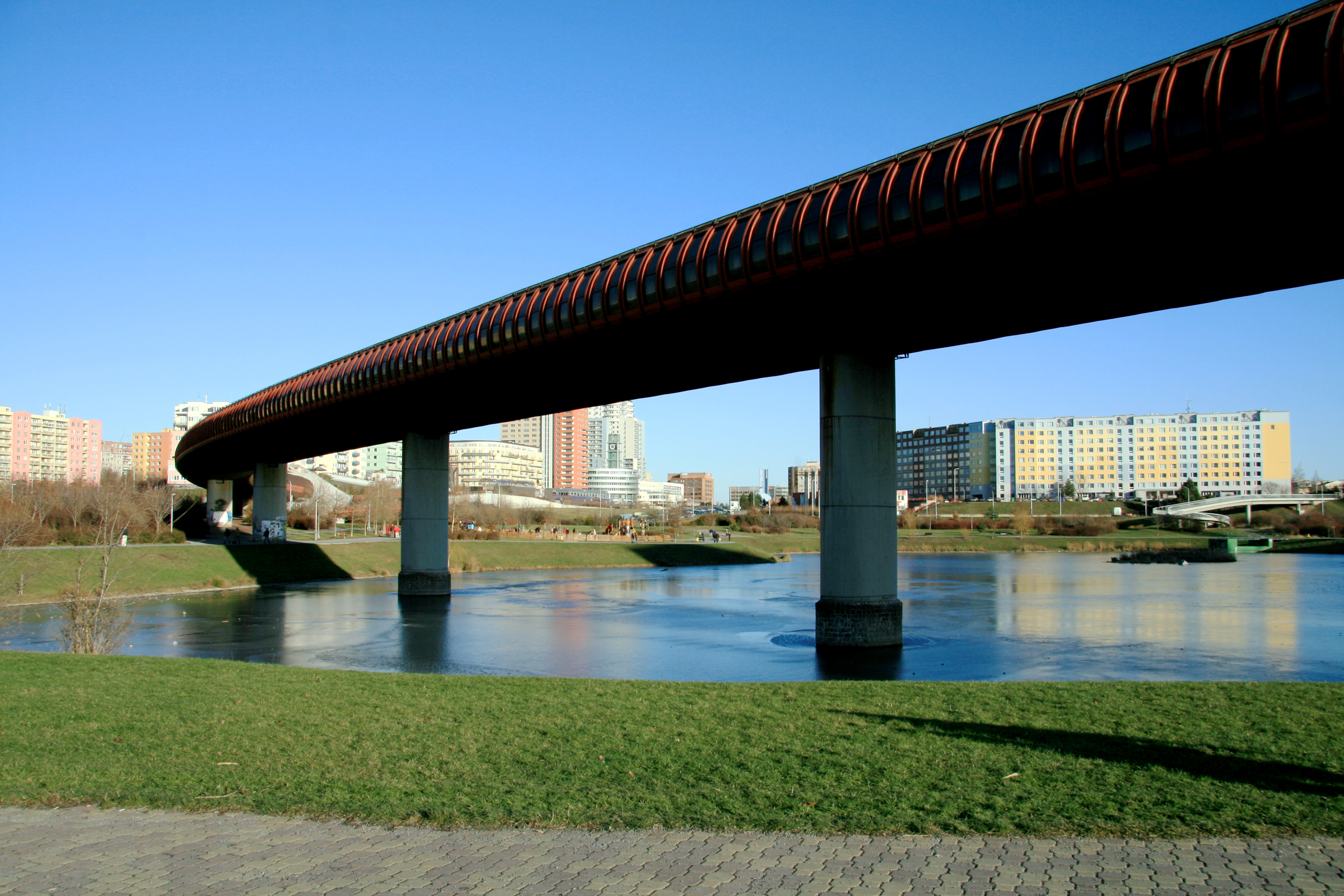
Metro tube between stations Hůrka and Lužiny

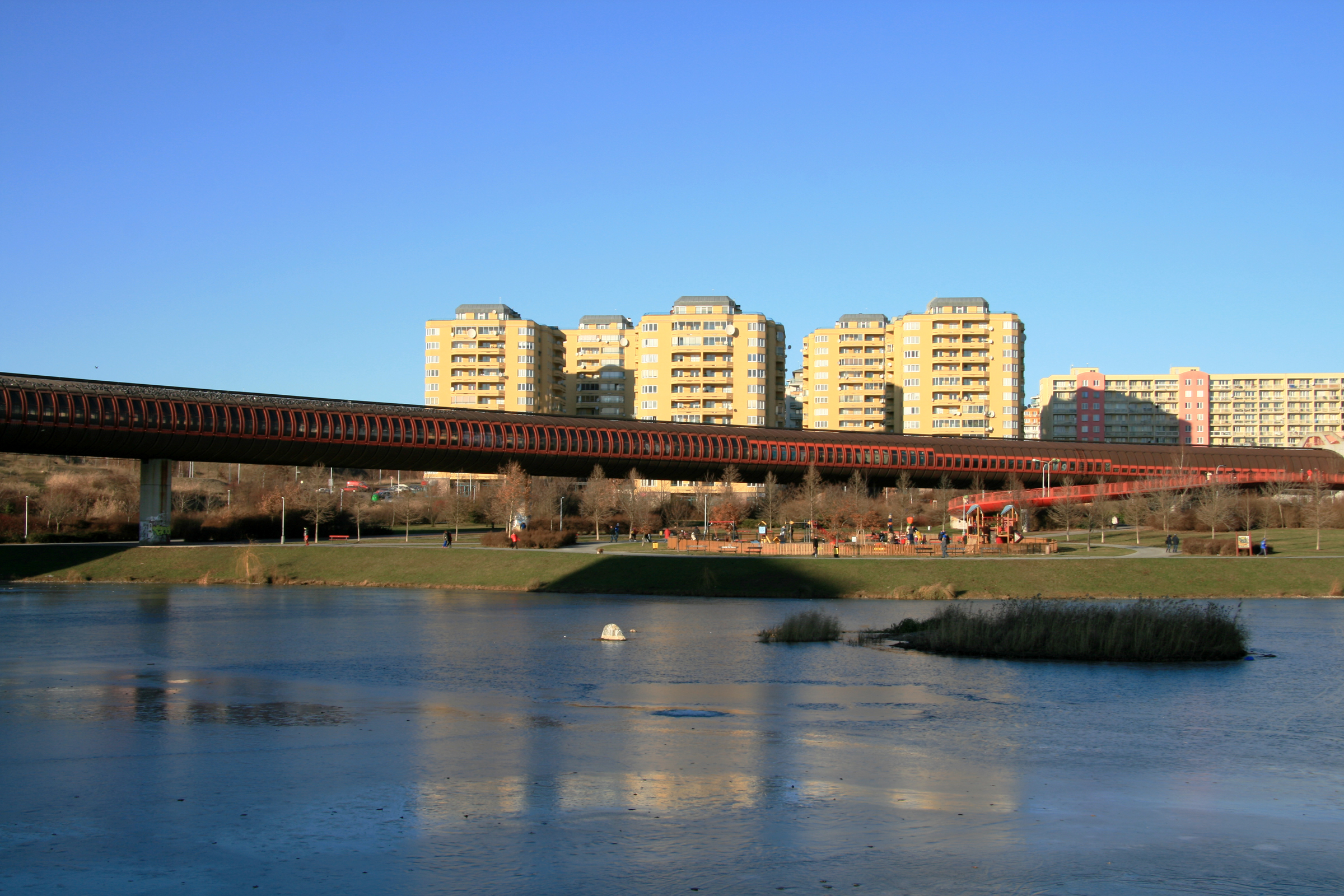
Metro tube between stations Hůrka and Lužiny

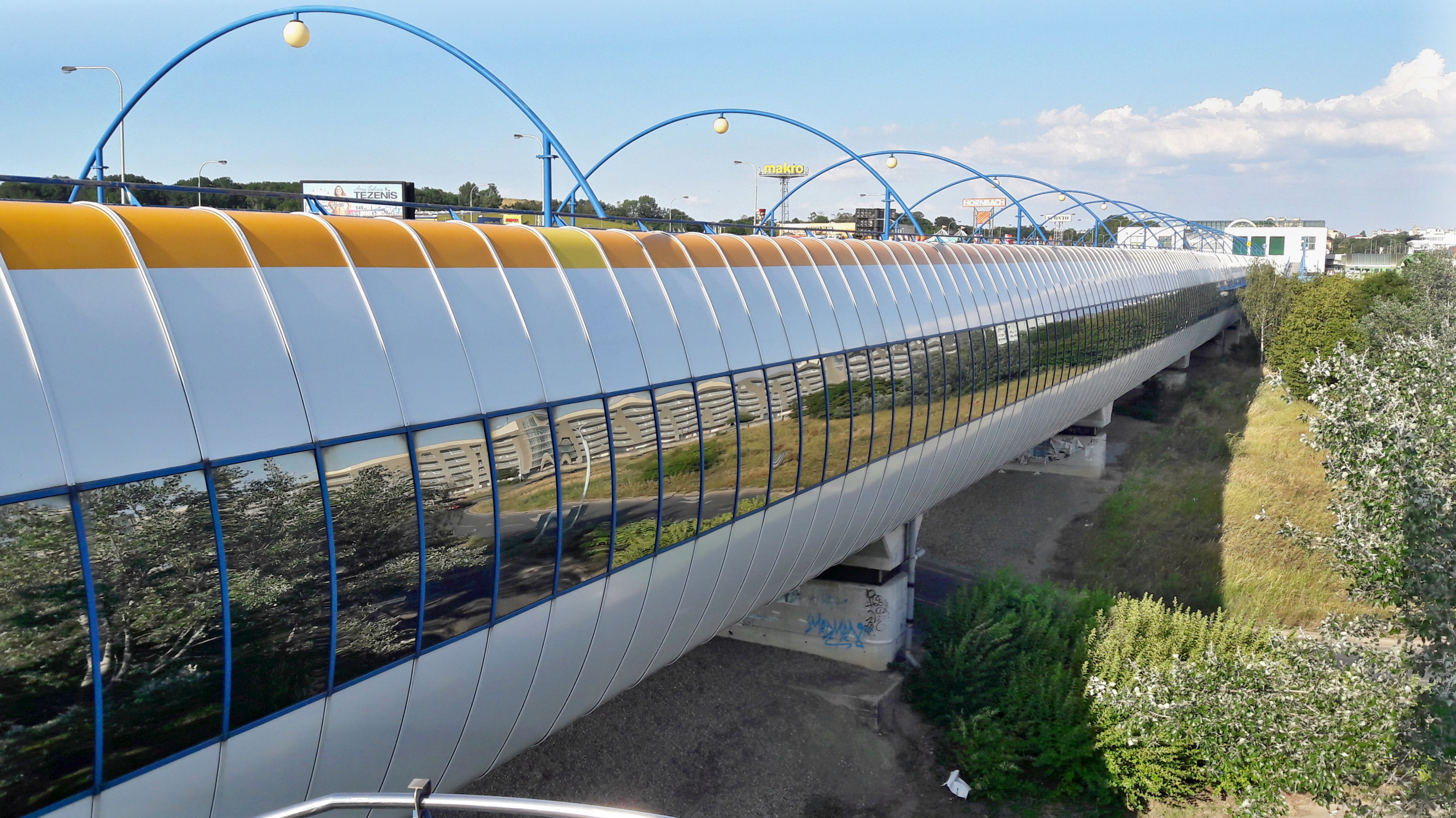
Metro tube between stations Černý most and Rajská zahrada

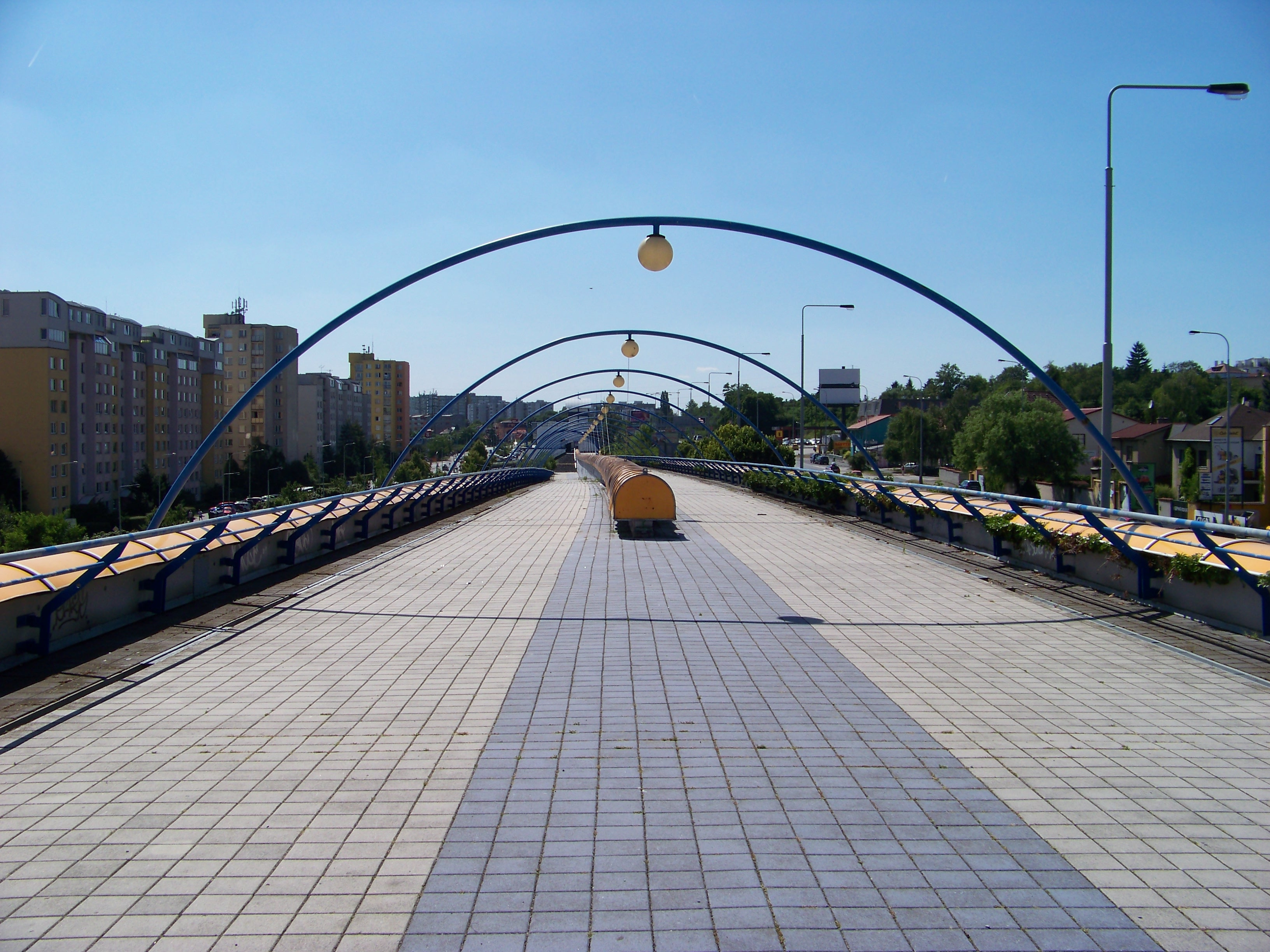
Sidewalk above the subway tube between station Černý most and Rajská zahrada

== See also ==
- List of metro systems
- Trams in Prague
- Buses in Prague
