= Sovin =

Sovin may refer to:

- Sobe (sister of Saint Anne)
- Sovin, Sarab, village in Iran
- Suvin, Meyaneh, village in Iran

== See also ==
- Sobin
