= Sobin =

Sobin may refer to:

== Places ==
- Sobin, Lower Silesian Voivodeship (south-west Poland)
- Sobin, Warmian-Masurian Voivodeship (north Poland)
- Sobín, cadastral area of Prague, Czech Republic

== People ==
- Sobin (surname), includes a list of people with the name

== See also ==
- Subin (disambiguation)
