= Radlická (Prague Metro) =

Prague metro station

Coordinates: 50.058°N 14.389°E

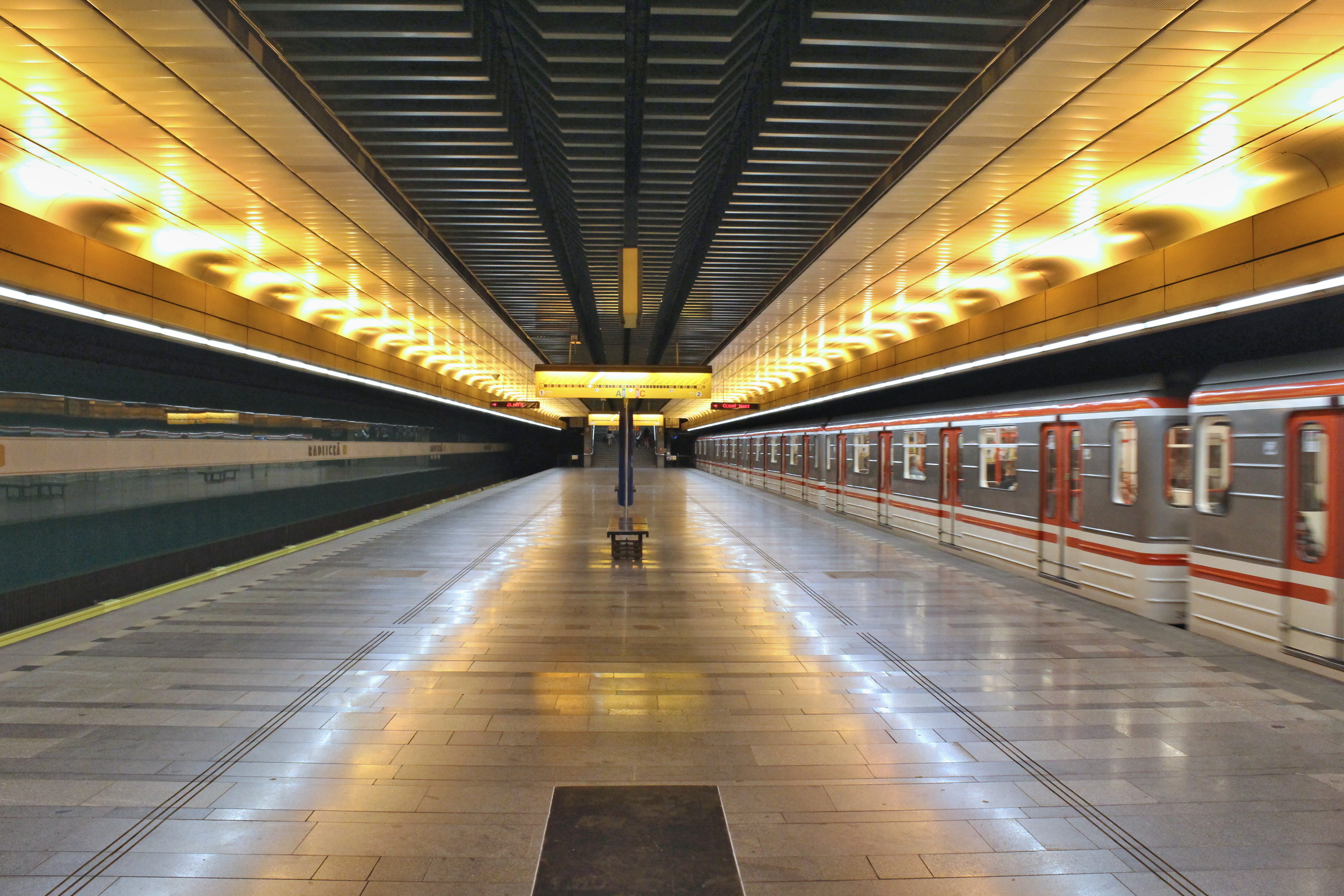

General information
- Location: Radlická street Radlice, Prague 5 Prague; Czech Republic
- System: Prague Metro
- Platforms: 1 island platform
- Tracks: 2

Construction
- Structure type: Underground
- Depth: 115 m (377 ft)

Other information
- Fare zone: PID: Prague

History
- Opened: 26 October 1988; 37 years ago

Services
Preceding station	Prague Metro	Following station
Jinonice toward Zličín	Line B	Smíchovské nádraží toward Černý Most
Location

Radlická (Czech pronunciation: [ˈradlɪtskaː]) is a Prague Metro station on Line B, located in Radlice, Prague 5. It was opened on 26 October 1988 as part of the line extension from Smíchovské nádraží to Nové Butovice.

== Gallery ==
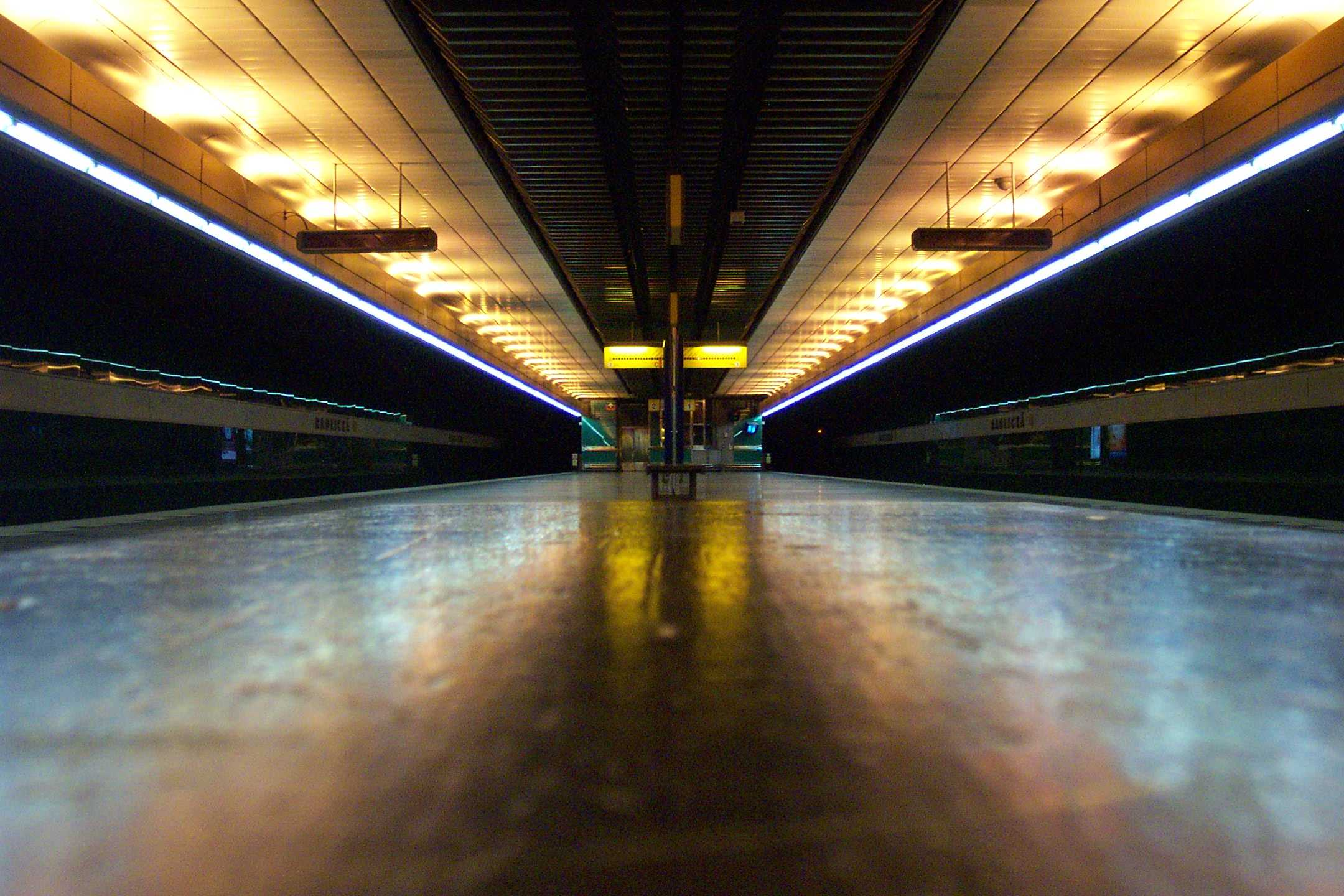
Radlická metro station

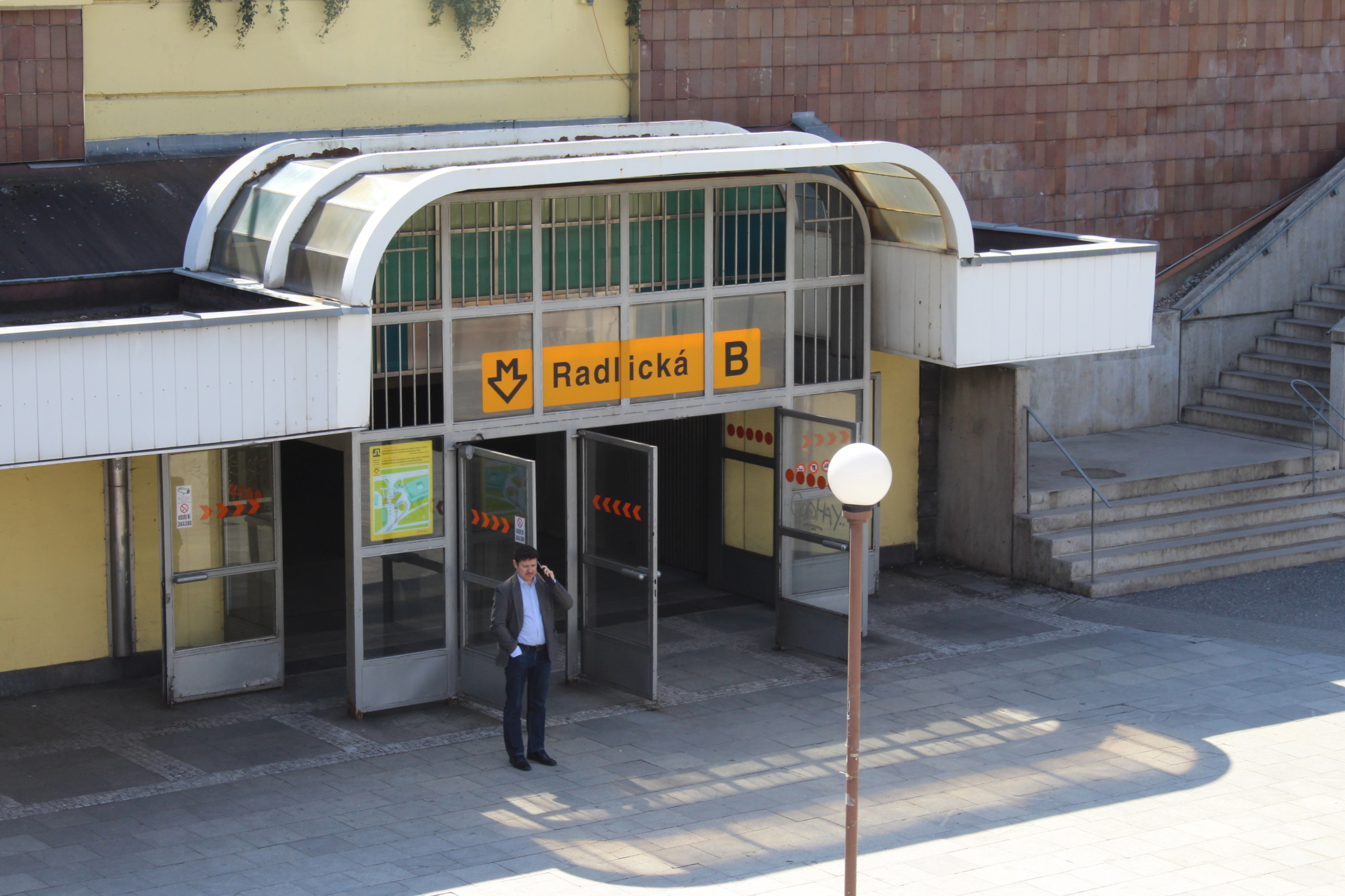
One of the entrances to the station
