= Jinonice (Prague Metro) =

Prague metro station

Coordinates: 50°03′16″N 14°22′16″E

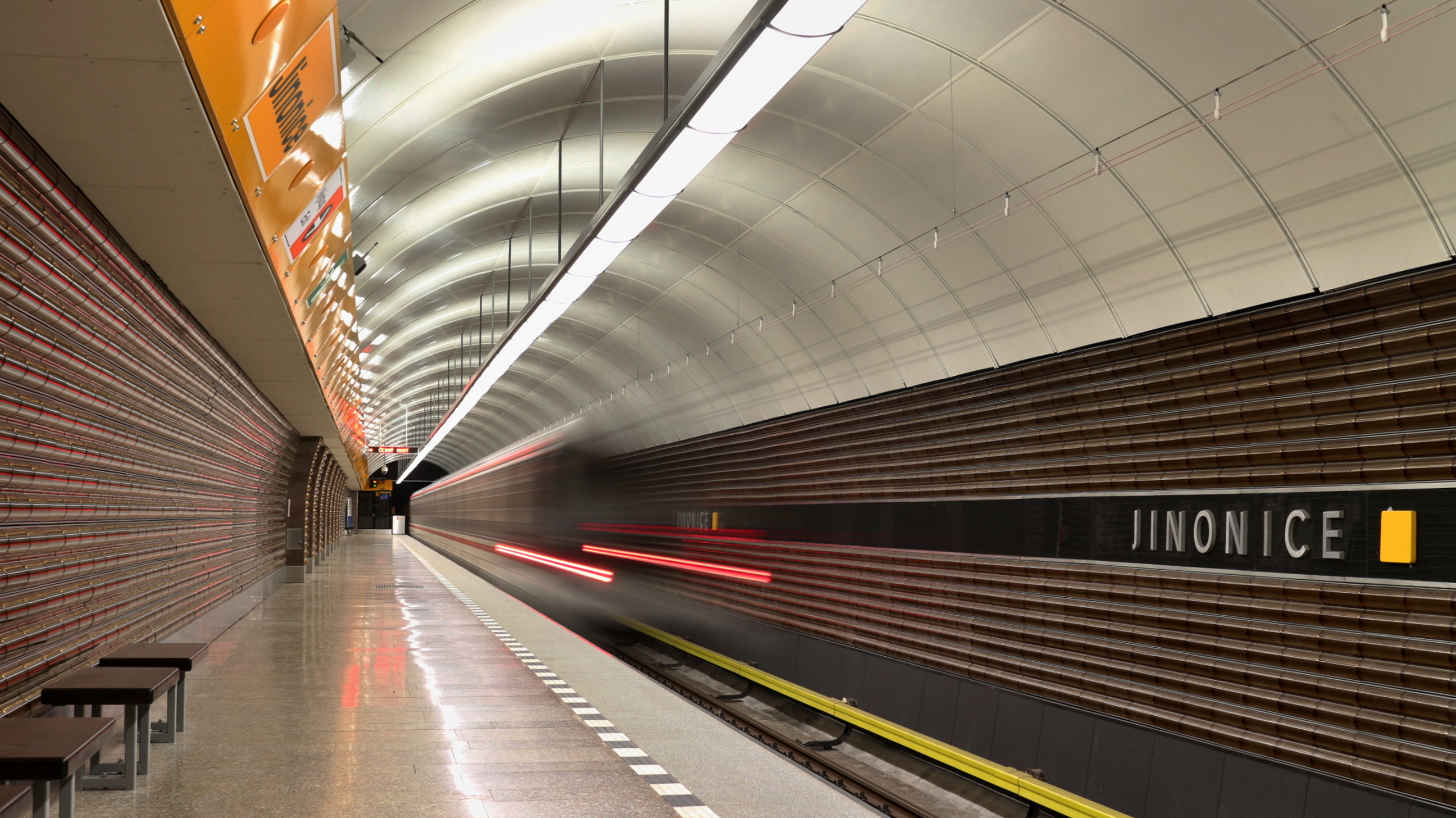

General information
- Location: Radlická street Jinonice, Prague 5 Prague; Czech Republic
- System: Prague Metro
- Platforms: 1 island platform
- Tracks: 2

Construction
- Structure type: Underground
- Depth: 23 m (75 ft)

Other information
- Fare zone: PID: P

History
- Opened: 26 October 1988; 38 years ago

Services
Preceding station	Prague Metro	Following station
Nové Butovice toward Zličín	Line B	Radlická toward Černý Most
Location

Jinonice (Czech pronunciation: [ˈjɪnoɲɪtsɛ]) is a Prague Metro station on Line B, located in Jinonice, Prague 5. It was opened on 26 October 1988 as part of the line extension from Smíchovské nádraží to Nové Butovice. General reconstruction took place in 2017.

The station used to be named Švermova, after the journalist and resistance fighter Jan Šverma.

== Gallery ==
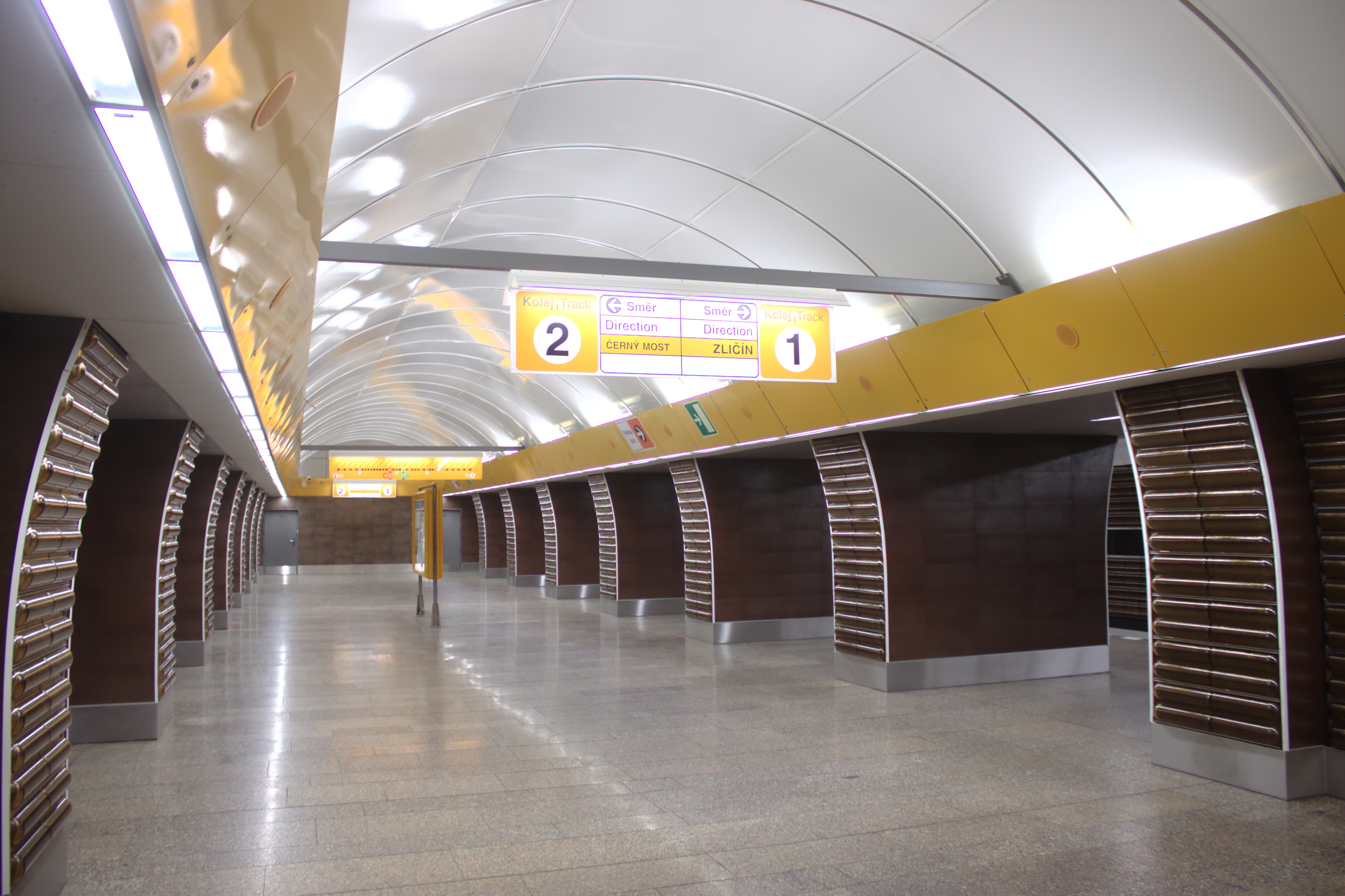
Jinonice metro station after reconstruction in 2017

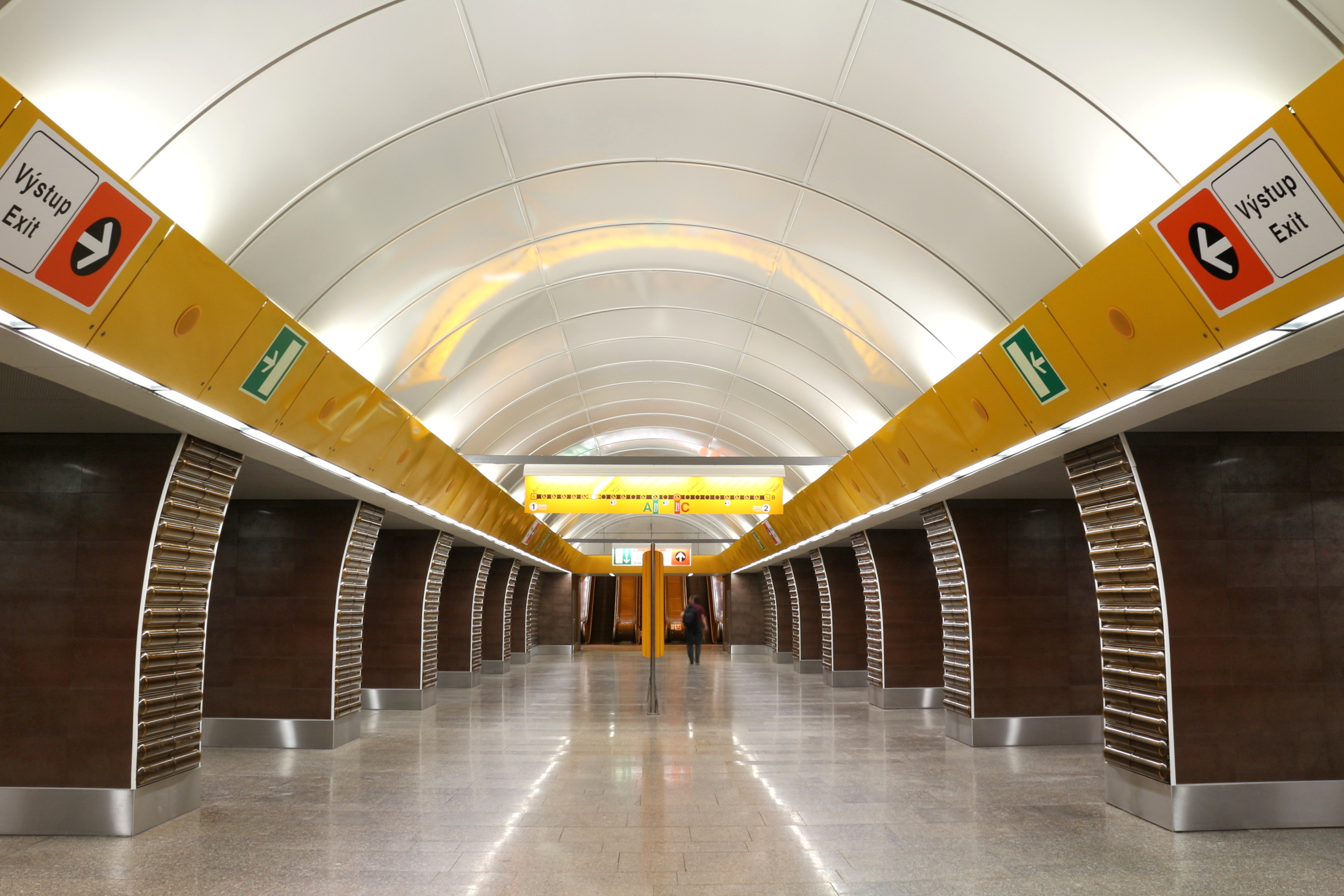
Platforms after renovation
