= Zličín =

Coordinates: 50°03′34″N 14°17′36″E

- Municipal district & Cadastral area of Prague
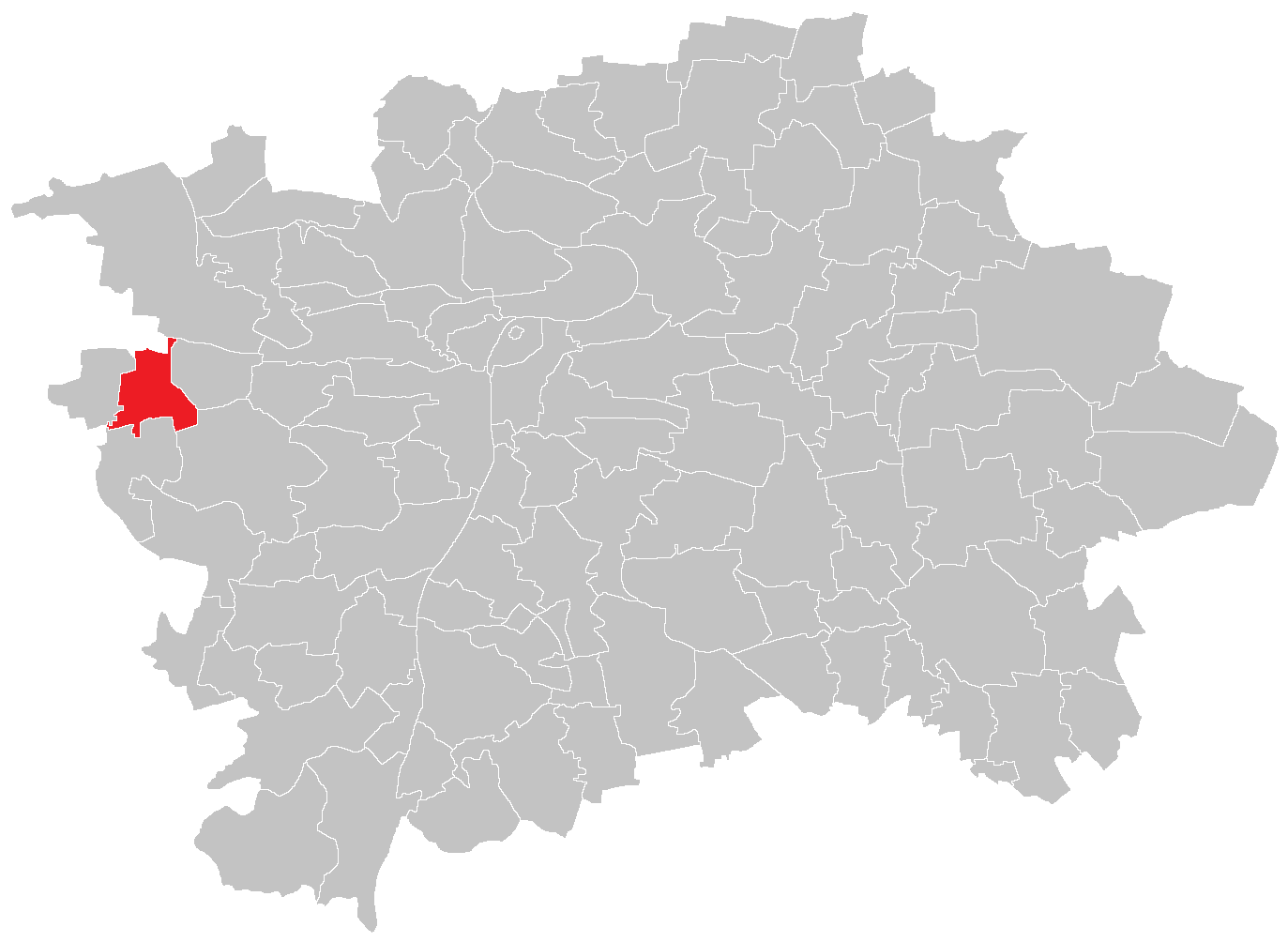
- Location of Zličín in Prague
- Country: Czechia
- Municipality: Prague

Area
  - Total: 6.82 km^{2} (2.63 sq mi)

Population
  - Total: 9,042
  - Density: 1,330/km^{2} (3,430/sq mi)

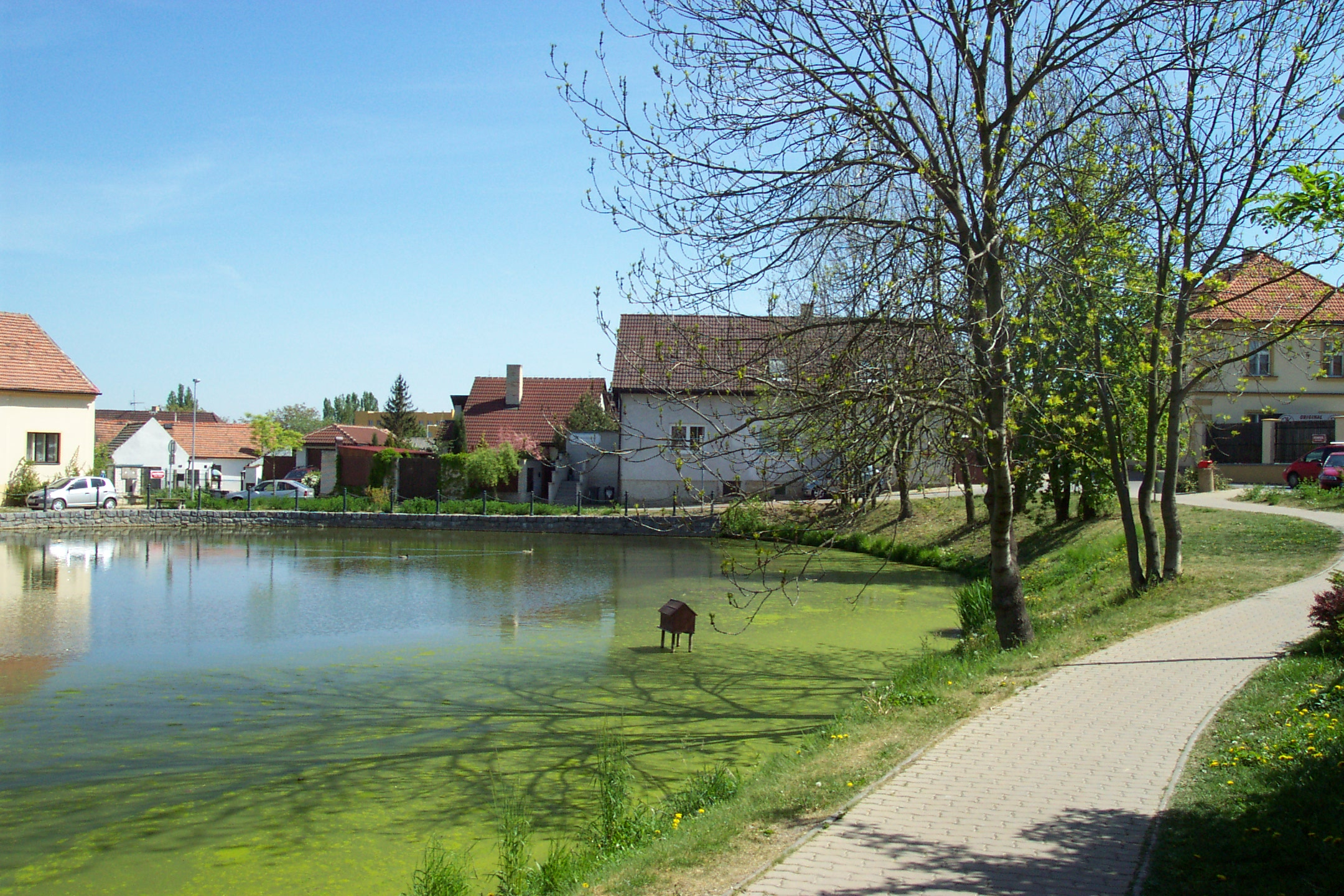
Zličín pond in the central part of this neighbourhood

Zličín is a district and cadastral area in the west of Prague, located in an administrative district of the same name, which is part of Prague 5 in the old system and governs the cadastral areas Zličín, Sobín and the northern part of Třebonice. The name is best known among Praguers as the site for a large bus station, Metro terminus and depot and a number of shopping centres and hypermarkets, all of which are named after Zličín, despite belonging to the neighbouring district Třebonice.
