= Sovin, Iran =

Sovin (Persian: سوين) may refer to:

- Sovin, Meyaneh
- Sovin, Sarab
