= Radlice (Prague) =

Neighborhood of Prague, Czech Republic

- Cadastral Area of Prague
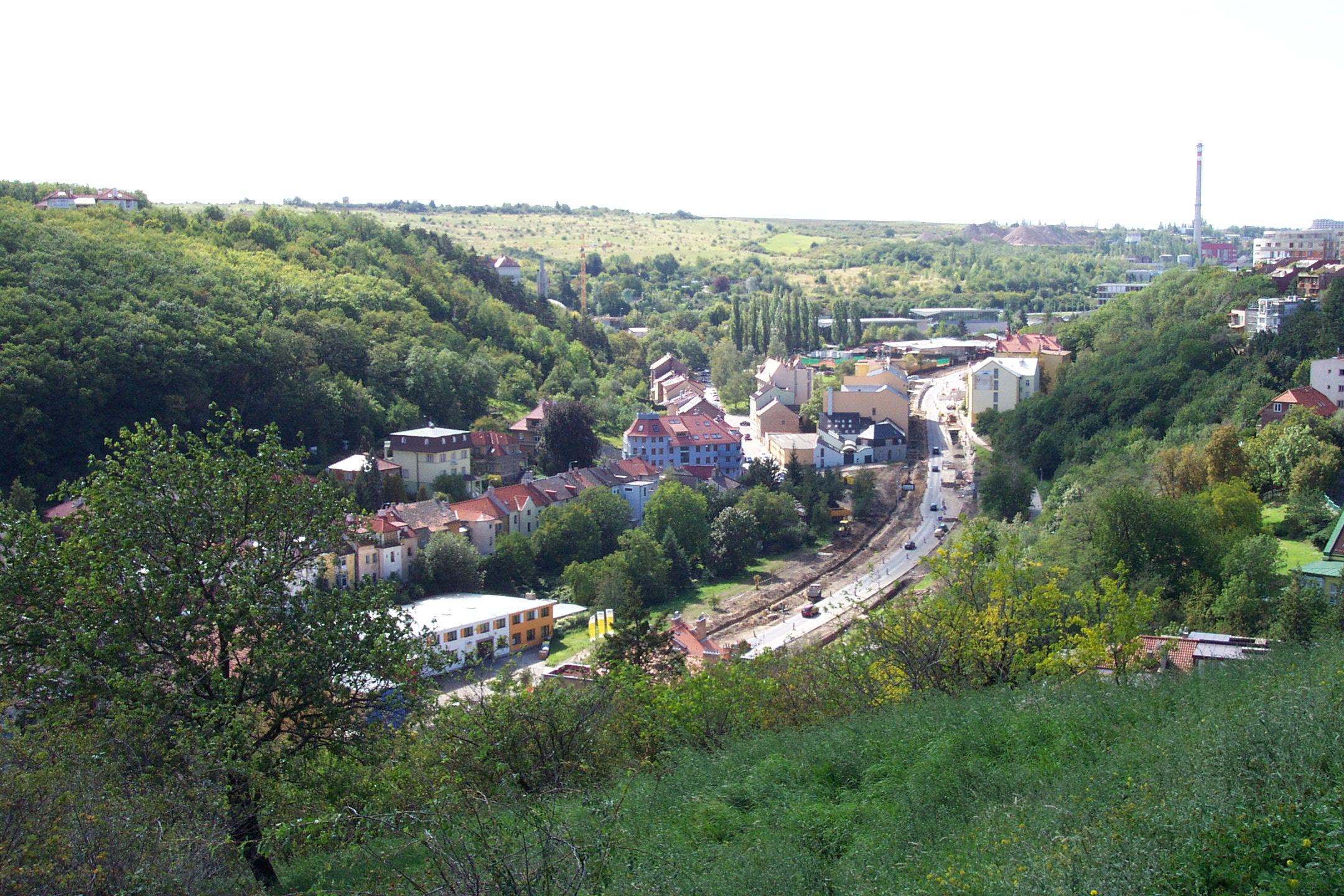
- View of Radlice from Smíchov

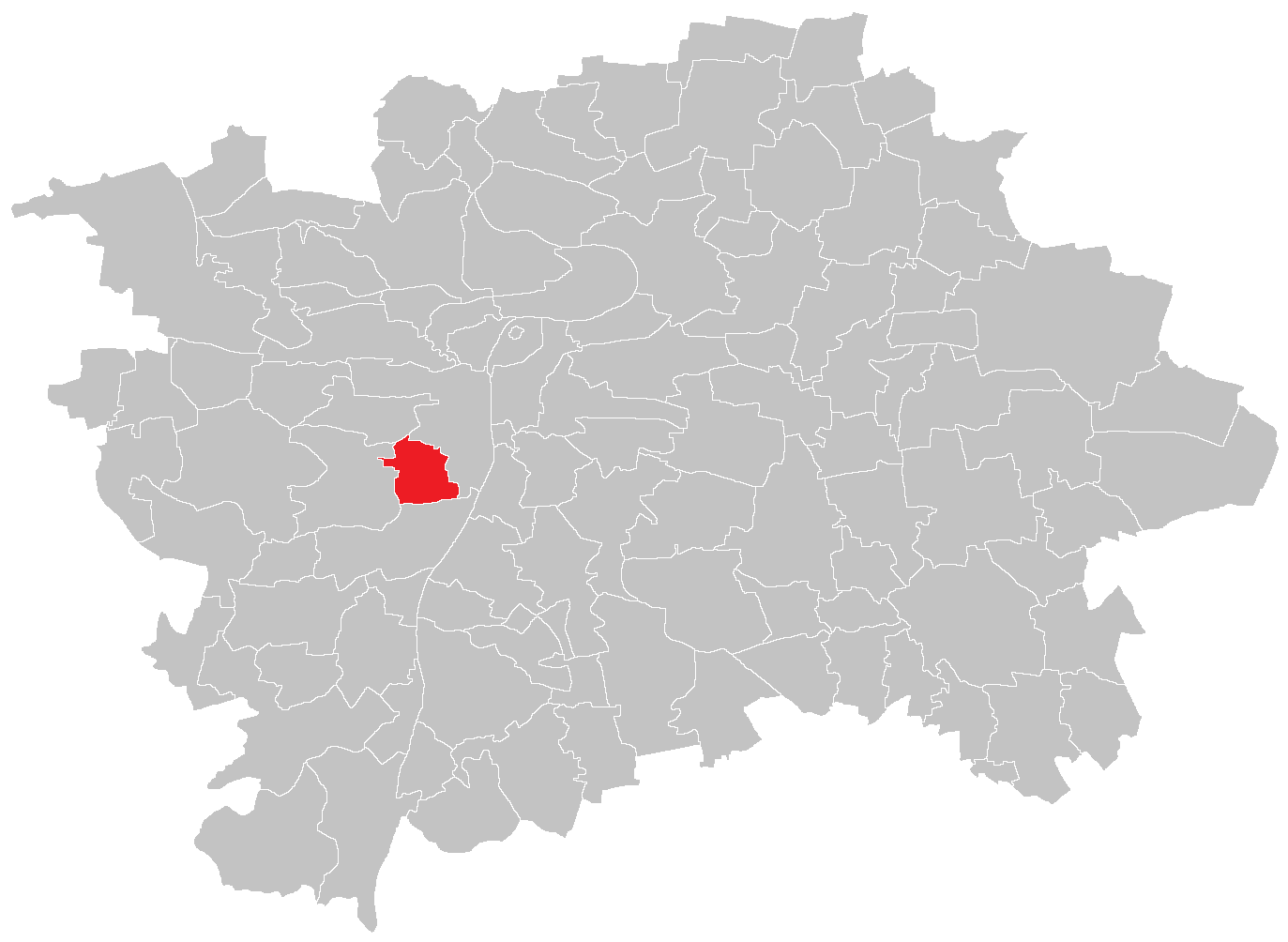
- Location of Radlice in Prague
- Coordinates: 50°03′18″N 14°23′22″E
- Country: Czech Republic
- Region: Prague
- District: Prague 5

Area
  - Total: 2.42 km^{2} (0.93 sq mi)

Population (2021)
  - Total: 1,952
  - Density: 807/km^{2} (2,090/sq mi)
- Time zone: UTC+1 (CET)
  - Summer (DST): UTC+2 (CEST)

Radlice (Czech pronunciation: [ˈradlɪtsɛ], German: Radlitz) is a district and cadastral area in the west of Prague, Czech Republic located in Prague 5, with a population of 1,952 as of 2021. It is bordered by Smíchov to the east and north-east, Košíře to the north-west, Jinonice to the west and Hlubočepy to the south. It became part of Prague in 1922.

The area is served by Radlická station on the Prague Metro line B. The metro station along with its adjacent bus terminal was constructed in the 1980s, and markedly changed the character of the neighbourhood, with many old houses from Radlice's time as a village demolished to make way for the new infrastructure. A Jewish cemetery and the chapel of St. John Nepomucene survived the reconstruction of the neighbourhood.

== Demographics ==
Historical population

Year	Pop.	±%
1869	414	—
1880	736	+77.8%
1890	1,763	+139.5%
1900	3,399	+92.8%
1910	3,370	−0.9%
1921	3,405	+1.0%
1930	4,184	+22.9%
1950	2,166	−48.2%

Year	Pop.	±%
1961	1,993	−8.0%
1970	1,718	−13.8%
1980	1,985	+15.5%
1991	1,820	−8.3%
2001	1,632	−10.3%
2011	1,886	+15.6%
2021	1,952	+3.5%

Source: Censuses
