= Košíře Synagogue =

Former synagogue in Prague, Czech Republic

- Košířská synagoga
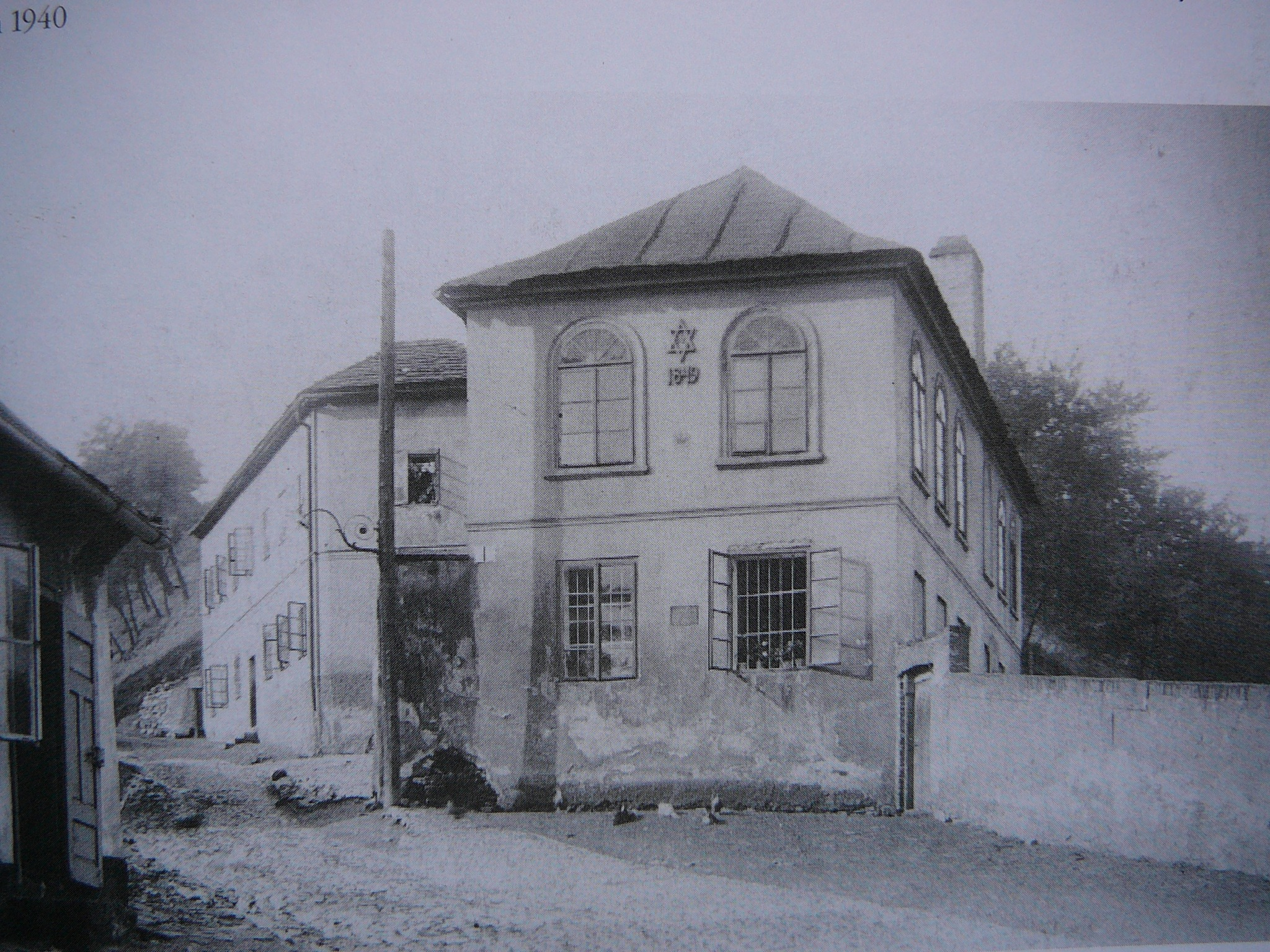
- The synagogue before its reconstruction

- Location within Prague

General information
- Type: Former synagogue
- Architectural style: Neoclassical
- Location: Košíře, Prague, Czech Republic, Na Popelce 201/3
- Coordinates: 50°4′15″N 14°23′15″E
- Completed: 1849
- Renovated: 1931

The Košíře Synagogue (Czech: Košířská synagoga) is a former Jewish prayer house in the Košíře district of Prague, Czech Republic. Originally built as a wing of the Popelka homestead, the building now serves as a residential apartment house.

== History ==
The synagogue was built in 1849 following the relaxation of political restrictions after the Revolutions of 1848, which allowed Jewish residents to move from the central ghetto to the developing industrial suburbs. It was constructed as the northern wing of the Popelka homestead (No. 201/3). Architecturally, it was a simple Neoclassical building characterised by tall arched windows. The interior had a capacity of 100 seats for men and a gallery for 50 women.

In 1894, the Jewish community of Košíře (which was an independent municipality until 1920) merged with the neighbouring Smíchov community. The synagogue remained in use until 1931, when it was closed following the opening of the new Smíchov Synagogue. In 1933, the building was converted into a Jewish orphanage and a shelter for the poor.

During the German occupation, the building was used by the Treuhandstelle as a warehouse for looted Jewish property.

A radical reconstruction took place in 1952, converting the building into an apartment block. During this process, the distinctive sacral features, including the tall arched windows, were removed to match the surrounding residential architecture.

== Gallery ==
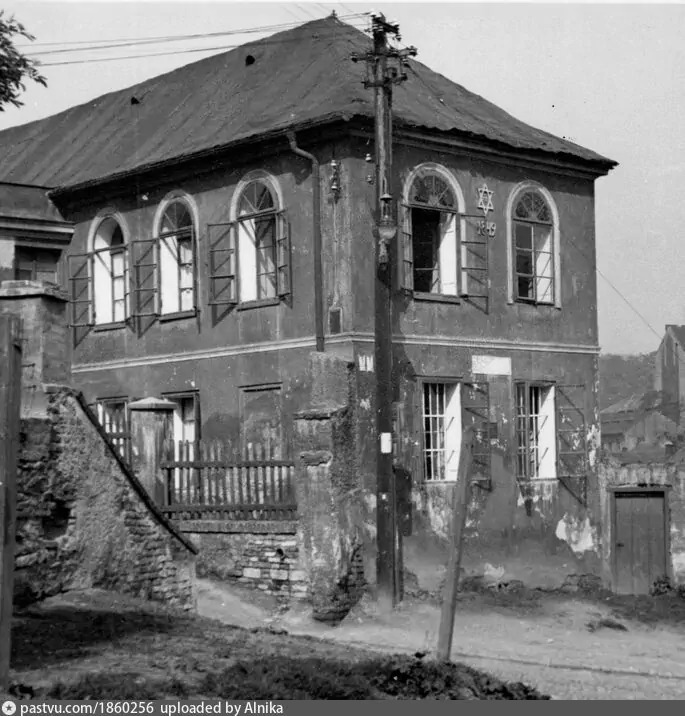
General view of the synagogue before reconstruction

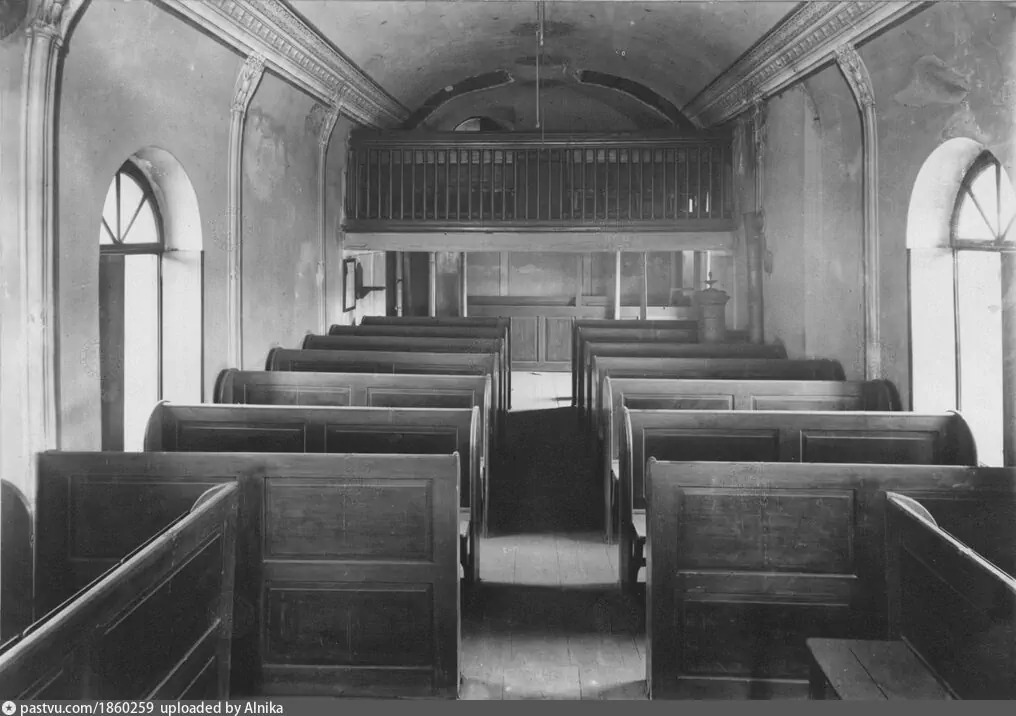
Interior of the synagogue

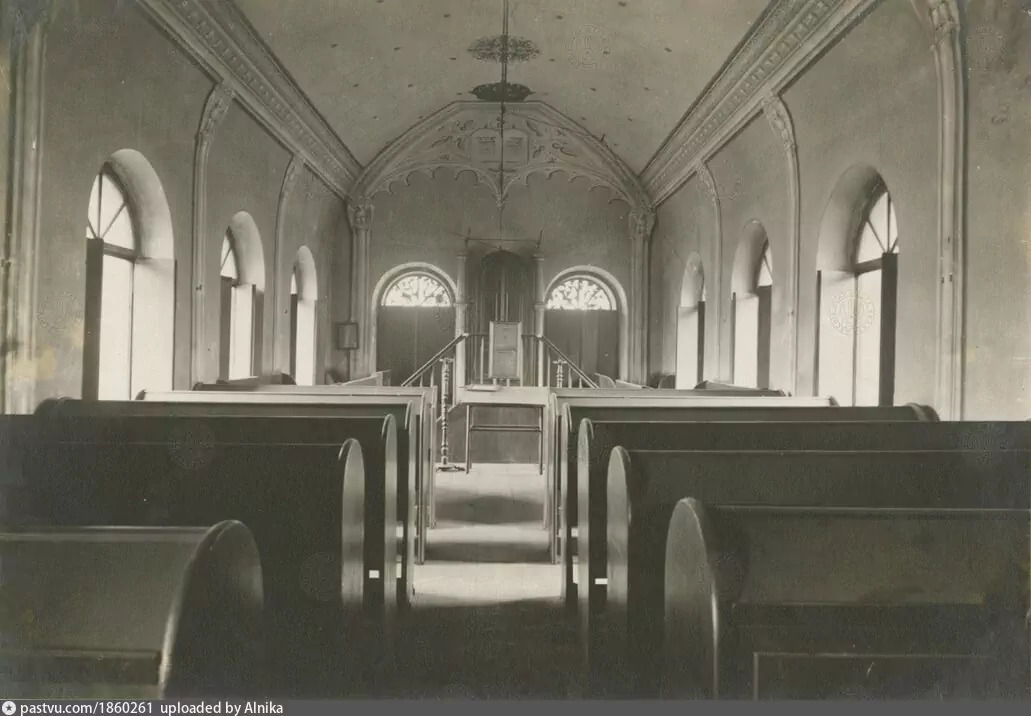
Interior looking towards the Torah ark

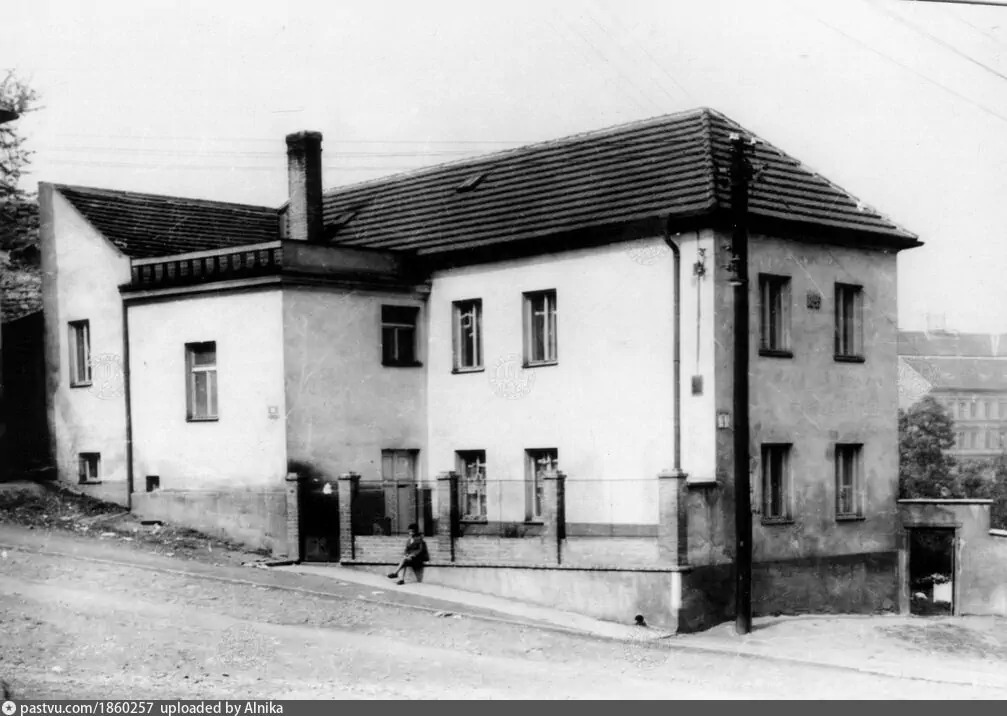
The building used as an orphanage

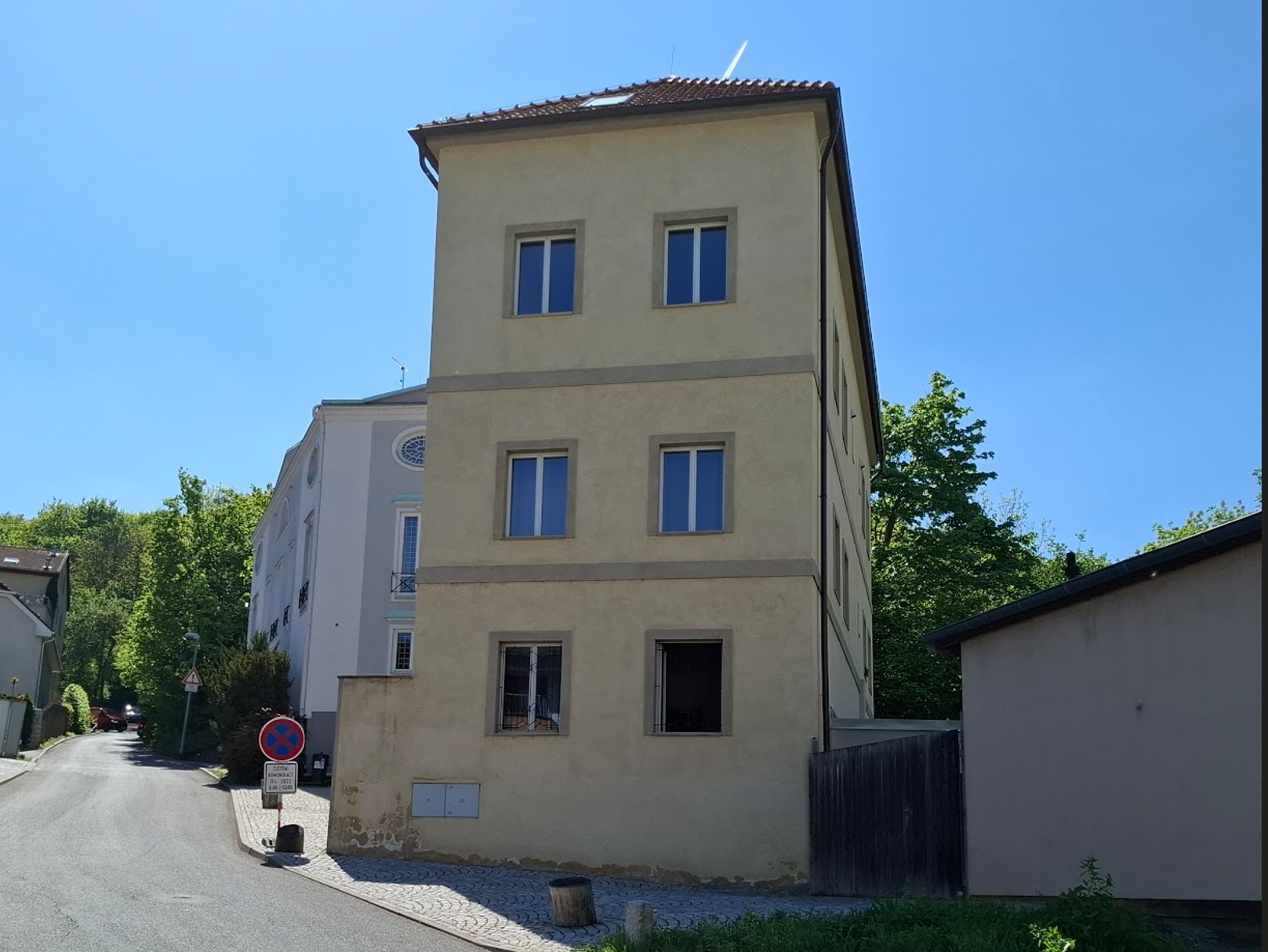
The current appearance of the building

== See also ==
- History of the Jews in the Czech lands
- History of the Jews in Prague
