= Motol =

Motol may refer to the following places:

- Motol (Prague), Czech Republic
- Motal, Belarus
