= Košíře =

- Cadastral Area of Prague
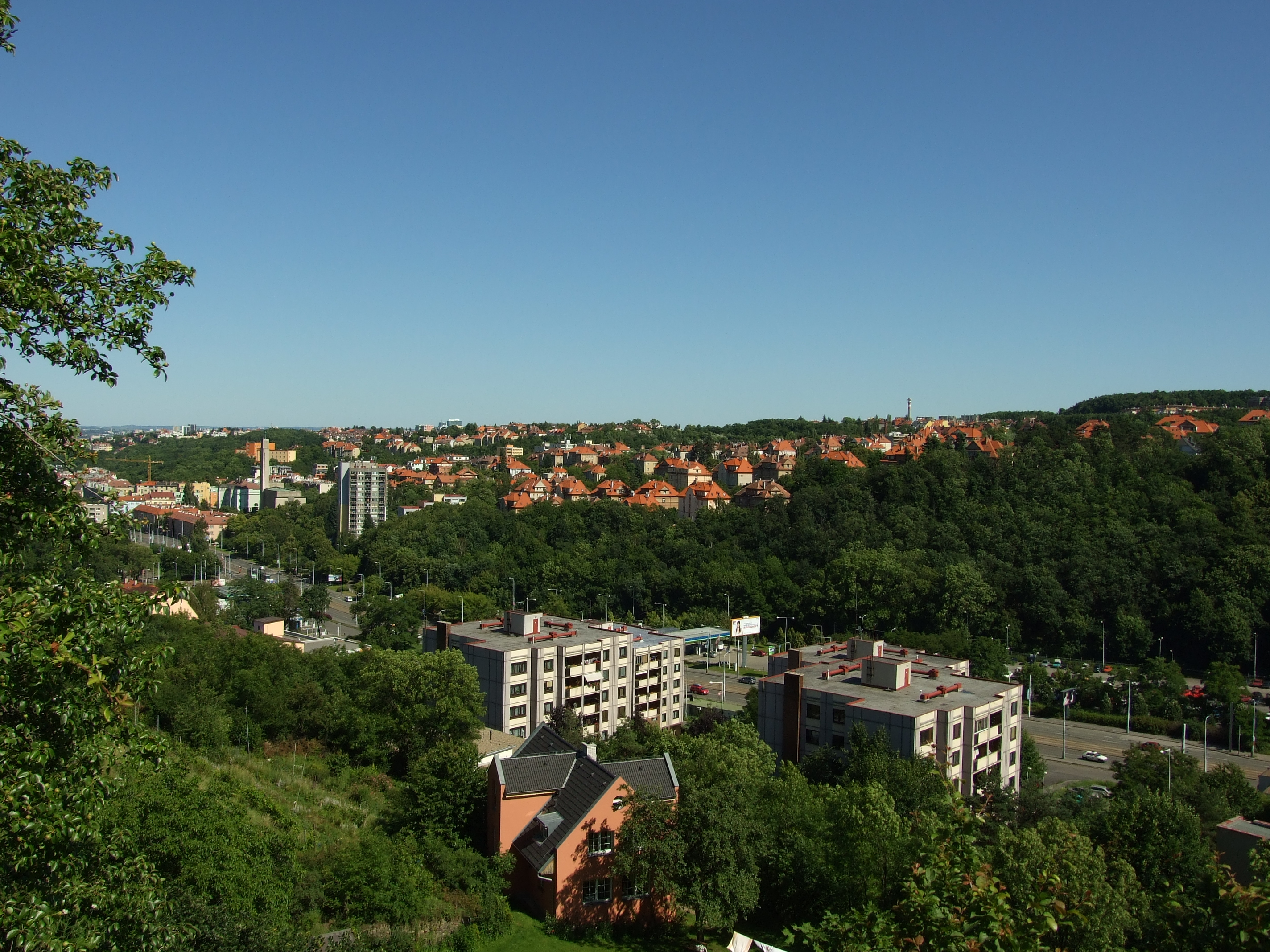
- Košíře as seen from Motol

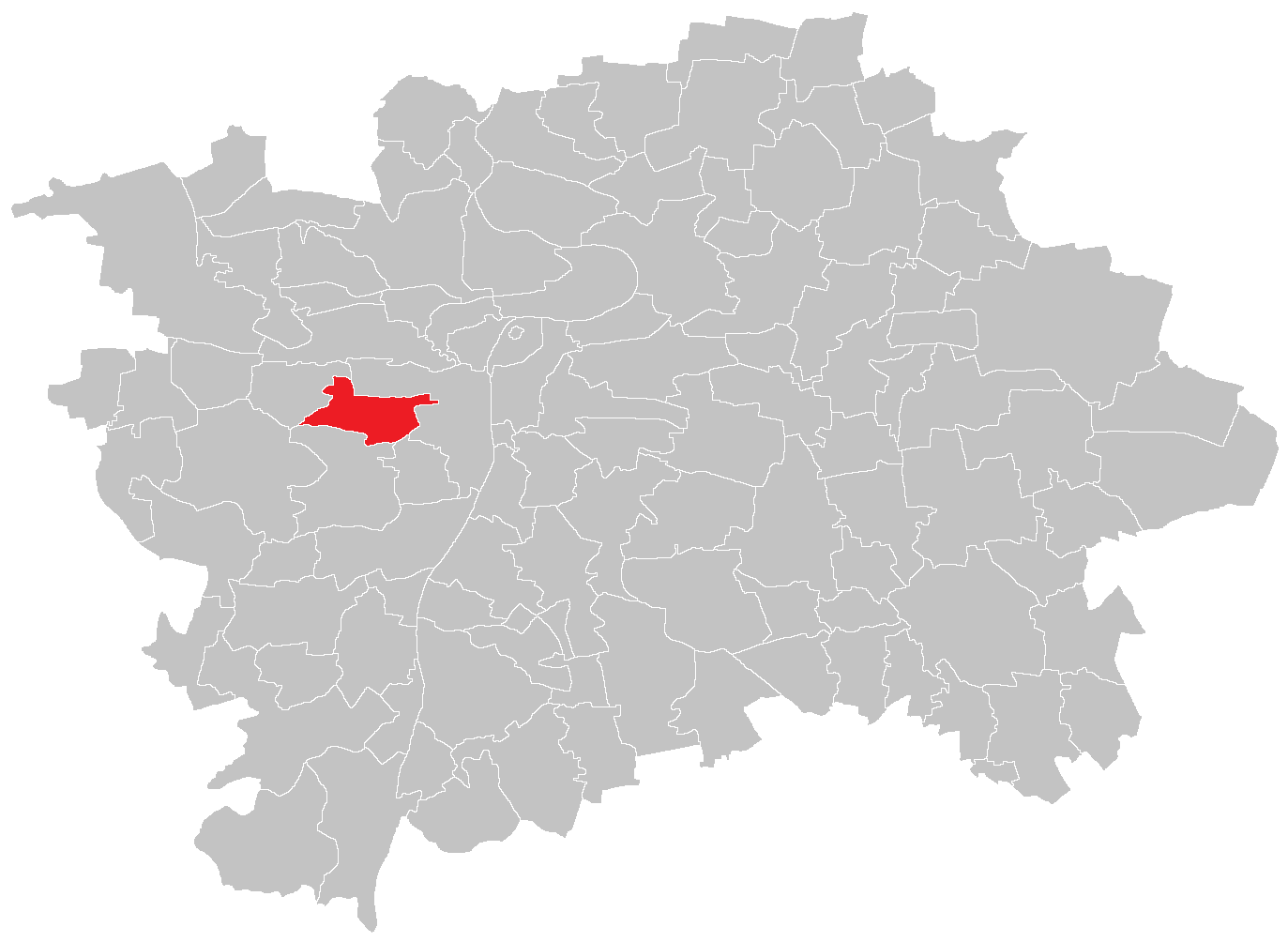
- Location of Košíře in Prague
- Coordinates: 50°03′58″N 14°22′05″E
- Country: Czech Republic
- Region: Prague
- District: Prague 5

Area
  - Total: 3.23 km^{2} (1.25 sq mi)

Population (2021)
  - Total: 16,145
  - Density: 5,000/km^{2} (12,900/sq mi)
- Time zone: UTC+1 (CET)
  - Summer (DST): UTC+2 (CEST)

Košíře is a district of Prague, part of the municipal area Prague 5. It is situated in the valley of the Motol brook between the districts Smíchov and Motol. Košíře became a town in 1896 and was joined onto Prague in 1921.

== History ==
Košíře was a village until the second half of the 19th century. Thanks to the development of industry it was necessary to build accommodation there, because workers were moving there. The first electric tram in Prague was also tested there on the tram line from Anděl to Košíře (today Kavalírka).

== Characteristics ==
Košíře is a mostly residential district. Košíře is also the location for many embassies, such as the Indonesian and Vietnamese.

== Demographics ==
Historical population

Year	Pop.	±%
1869	1,670	—
1880	2,840	+70.1%
1890	5,126	+80.5%
1900	7,247	+41.4%
1910	12,293	+69.6%
1921	11,630	−5.4%
1930	16,245	+39.7%
1950	17,716	+9.1%

Year	Pop.	±%
1961	19,444	+9.8%
1970	16,415	−15.6%
1980	15,850	−3.4%
1991	14,183	−10.5%
2001	13,421	−5.4%
2011	15,069	+12.3%
2021	16,145	+7.1%

Source: Censuses

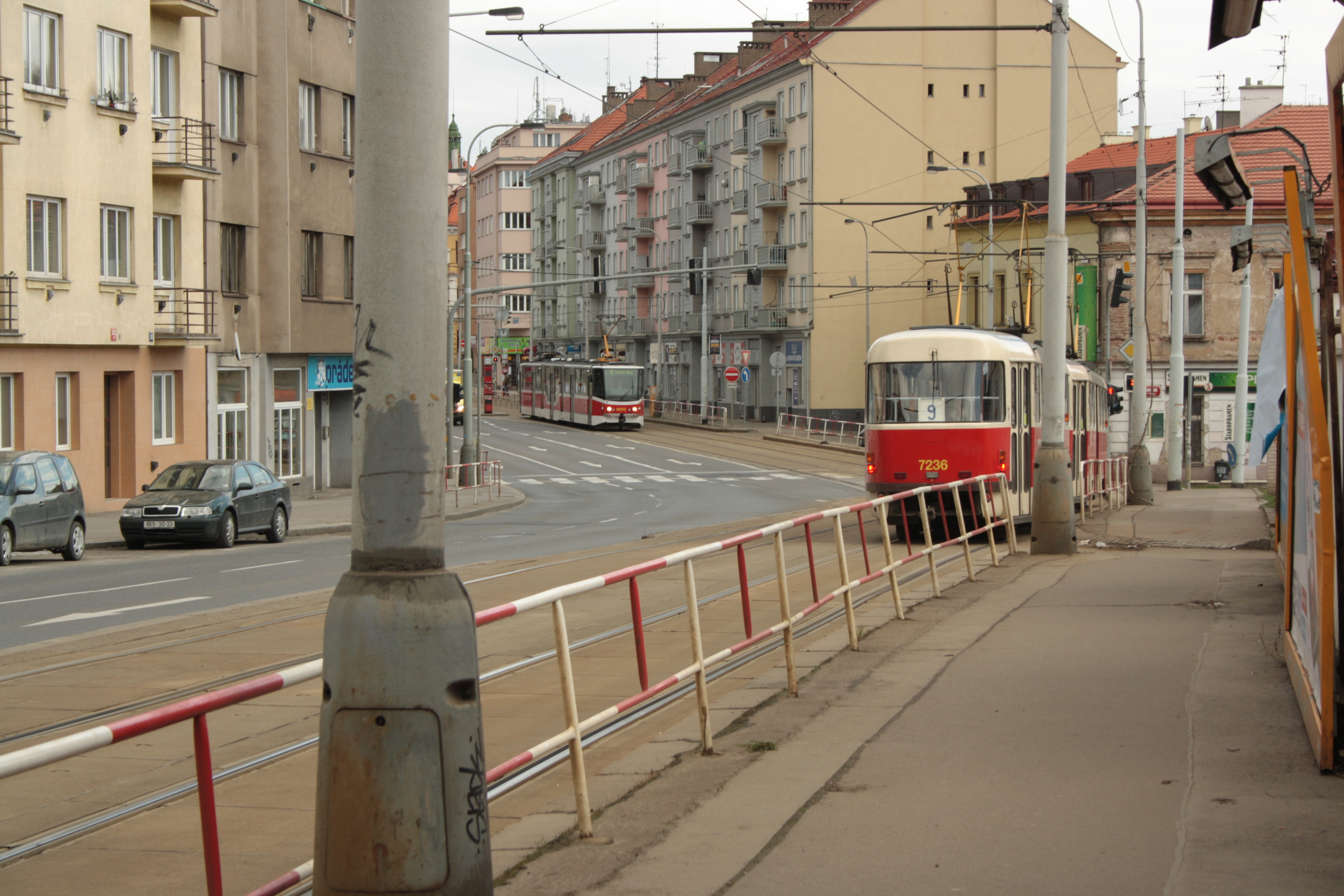
Plzeňská street in Košíře

== Neighboring districts ==
- Jinonice
- Radlice
- Smíchov
- Motol
- Strahov
