= Deutsche Schule Prag =

- Německá Škola v Praze

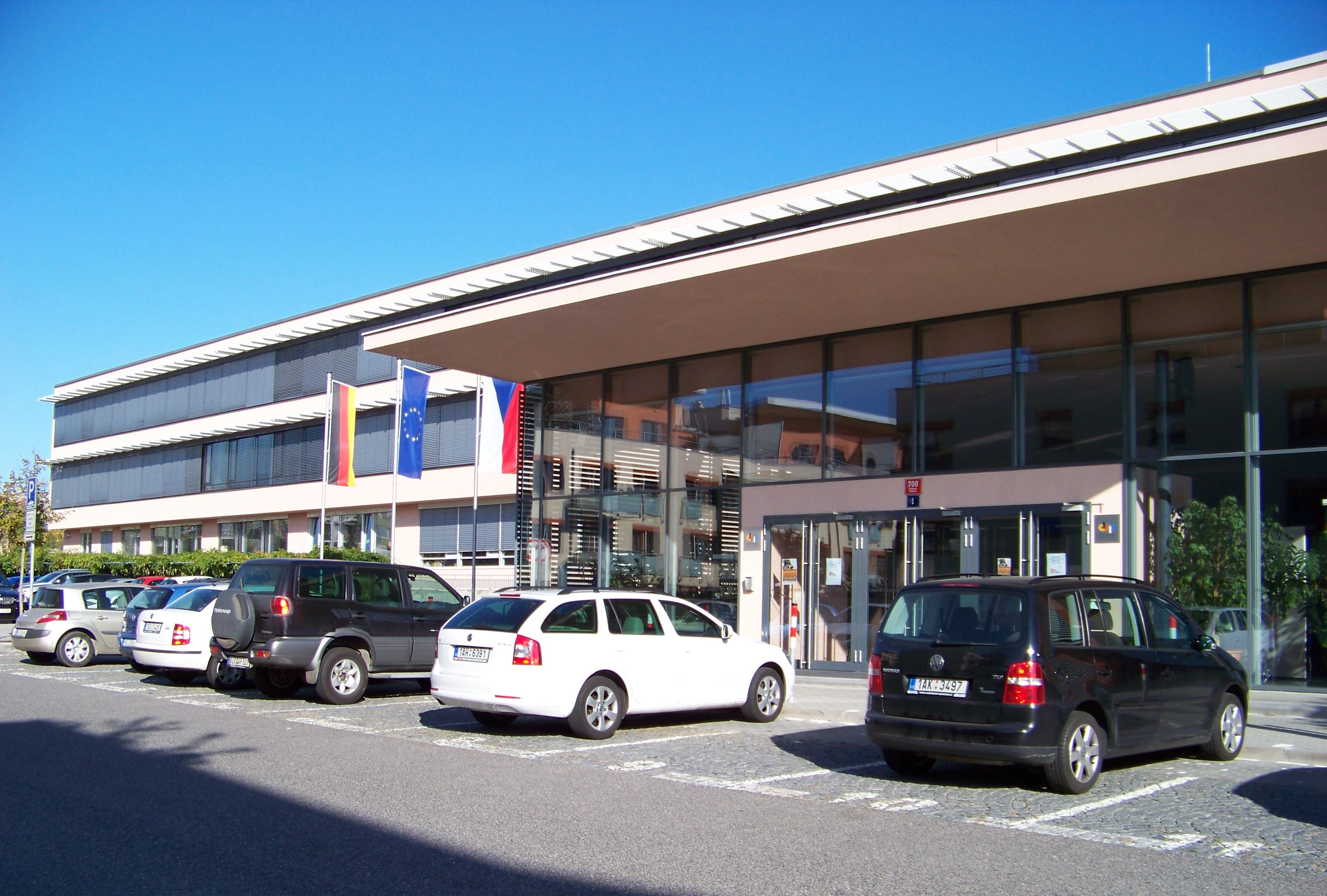

Location
- Schwarzenberská 1/700, Prague 5, 158 00; Prague; Czech Republic
- Coordinates: 50.0554°N 14.3541°E

Information
- Opened: 1989
- Website: https://dsp-praha.org/

Deutsche Schule Prag (DSP; Czech: Německá Škola v Praze) is a school in Jinonice, District 5, Prague, Czech Republic . It includes levels kindergarten, grundschule (primary school), and gymnasium (secondary school). It was established in 1989 as an initial bilateral project between East Germany and Czechoslovakia.
