= Smíchovské nádraží (Prague Metro) =

Prague metro station

Coordinates: 50.065°N 14.408°E

Smíchovské nádraží B

General information
- Location: Nádražní street Smíchov, Prague 5 Prague; Czech Republic
- System: Prague Metro
- Line: B Line B
- Platforms: 1 island platform
- Tracks: 2
- Connections: Praha-Smíchov S6, S7, S65, R16, R26; 5, 12, 15, 20, 94 City and regional bus lines

Construction
- Structure type: Underground
- Depth: 10 m (33 ft)
- Accessible: Yes

Other information
- Fare zone: PID: P

History
- Opened: 2 November 1985; 40 years ago

Services
Preceding station	Prague Metro	Following station
Radlická toward Zličín	Line B	Anděl toward Černý Most
Location

Smíchovské nádraží (Czech pronunciation: [ˈsmiːxofskɛː ˈnaːdraʒiː]) is a Prague Metro station on Line B. It serves the Smíchov railway station. The station was opened on 2 November 1985, as the southern terminus of the inaugural section of Line B between Sokolovská and Smíchovské nádraží. On 26 October 1988, Line B was extended further to Nové Butovice.

On February 13, 2024, modernization of Smíchov railway station began and is set to cost CZK 5.1 billion and has a completion of 2027.
