= Subin =

Subin may refer to:

- Subin, Kumasi, a sub-metropolitan area within Kumasi Metropolitan Area, Ashanti, Ghana
- Subin (Ghana parliament constituency)
- Šubin, village in the municipality of Srebrenica, Bosnia and Herzegovina
- Soo-bin, Korean given name

== See also ==
- Shubin
