= Sobin (surname) =

Sobin is a surname. Notable people with the surname include:

- David Sobin (fl. late 20th century), American inventor
- Gustaf Sobin (1935–2005), American-born poet and author
- Josip Sobin (born 1989), Croatian professional basketball player
- Slavko Sobin (born 1984), Croatian actor

== See also ==
- Saubin
