= Hlubočepy =

- Cadastral Area of Prague
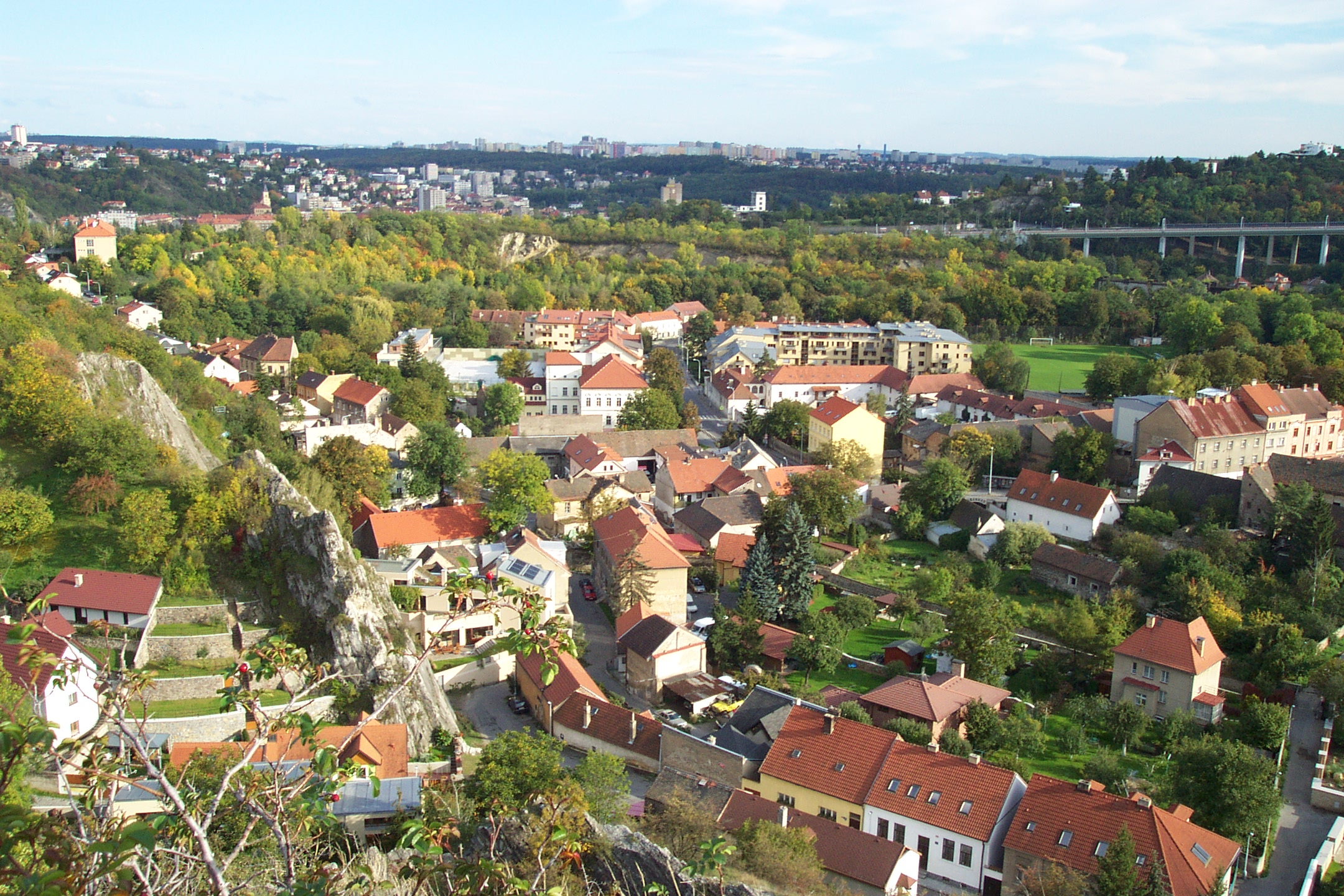
- View of Hlubočepy from the west

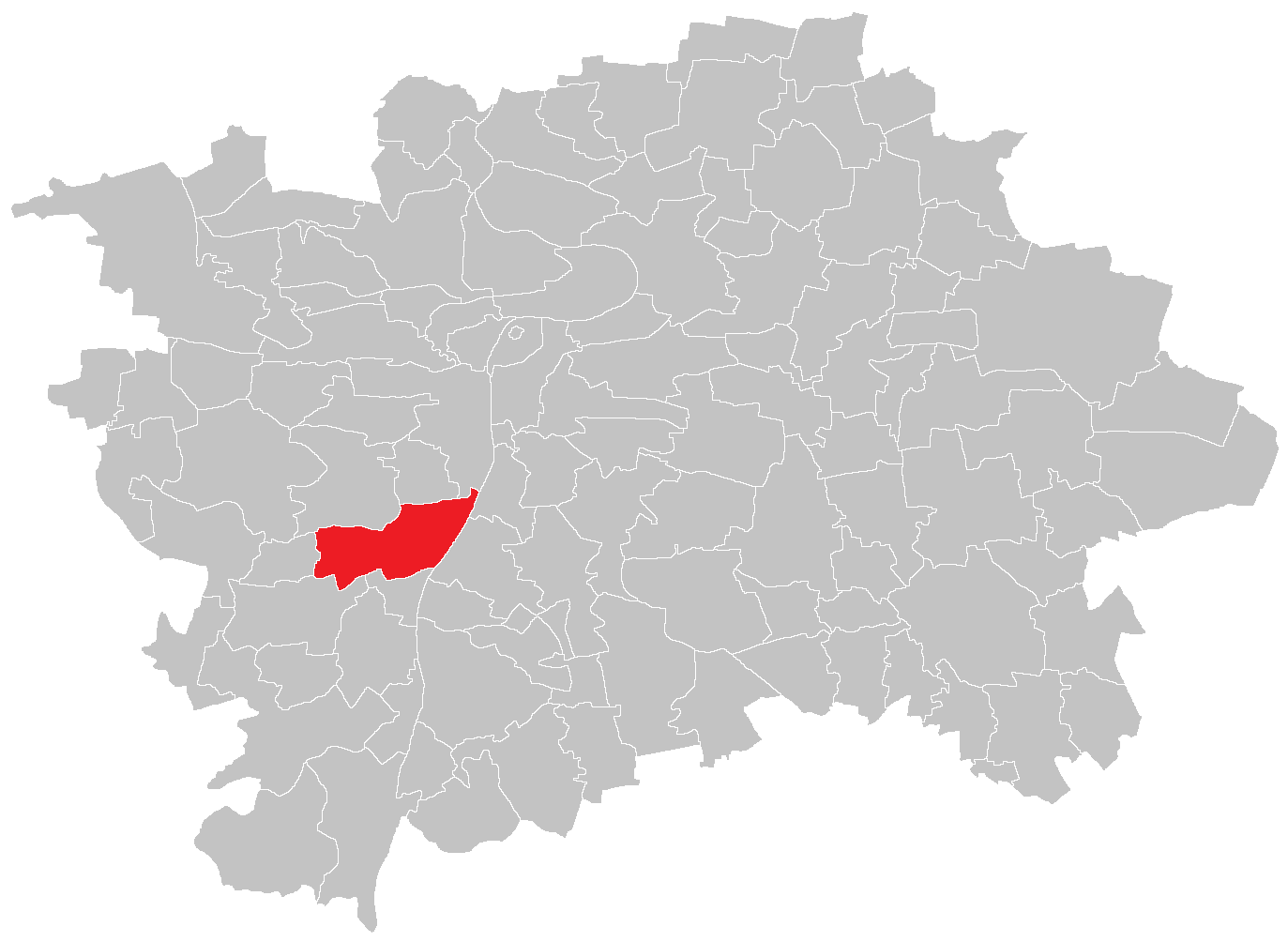
- Location of Hlubočepy in Prague
- Coordinates: 50°2′12″N 14°23′8″E
- Country: Czech Republic
- Region: Prague
- District: Prague 5

Area
  - Total: 6.07 km^{2} (2.34 sq mi)

Population (2021)
  - Total: 23,461
  - Density: 3,870/km^{2} (10,000/sq mi)
- Time zone: UTC+1 (CET)
  - Summer (DST): UTC+2 (CEST)

Hlubočepy (German: Kohlfelden) is a cadastral district of Prague, Czech Republic. In 2021 it had 23,461 inhabitants.

In this cadastral district lies a neighbourhood called Barrandov which is famous for its film studios (Barrandov Studios). The studios are now often called the "European Hollywood" or "Hollywood of the East" because of the increasing interest of western productions (such as the movies Mission Impossible, The Bourne Identity, Casino Royale, Prince Caspian, and many others). The name Barrandov is derived from the fossil-rich rocks which were studied by the French geologist Joachim Barrande.

== Demographics ==
Historical population

Year	Pop.	±%
1869	1,488	—
1880	2,299	+54.5%
1890	3,141	+36.6%
1900	3,800	+21.0%
1910	4,168	+9.7%
1921	4,067	−2.4%
1930	4,639	+14.1%
1950	4,728	+1.9%

Year	Pop.	±%
1961	4,858	+2.7%
1970	3,961	−18.5%
1980	3,479	−12.2%
1991	14,073	+304.5%
2001	20,662	+46.8%
2011	22,731	+10.0%
2021	23,461	+3.2%

Source: Censuses
