= Nové Butovice (Prague Metro) =

Prague metro station

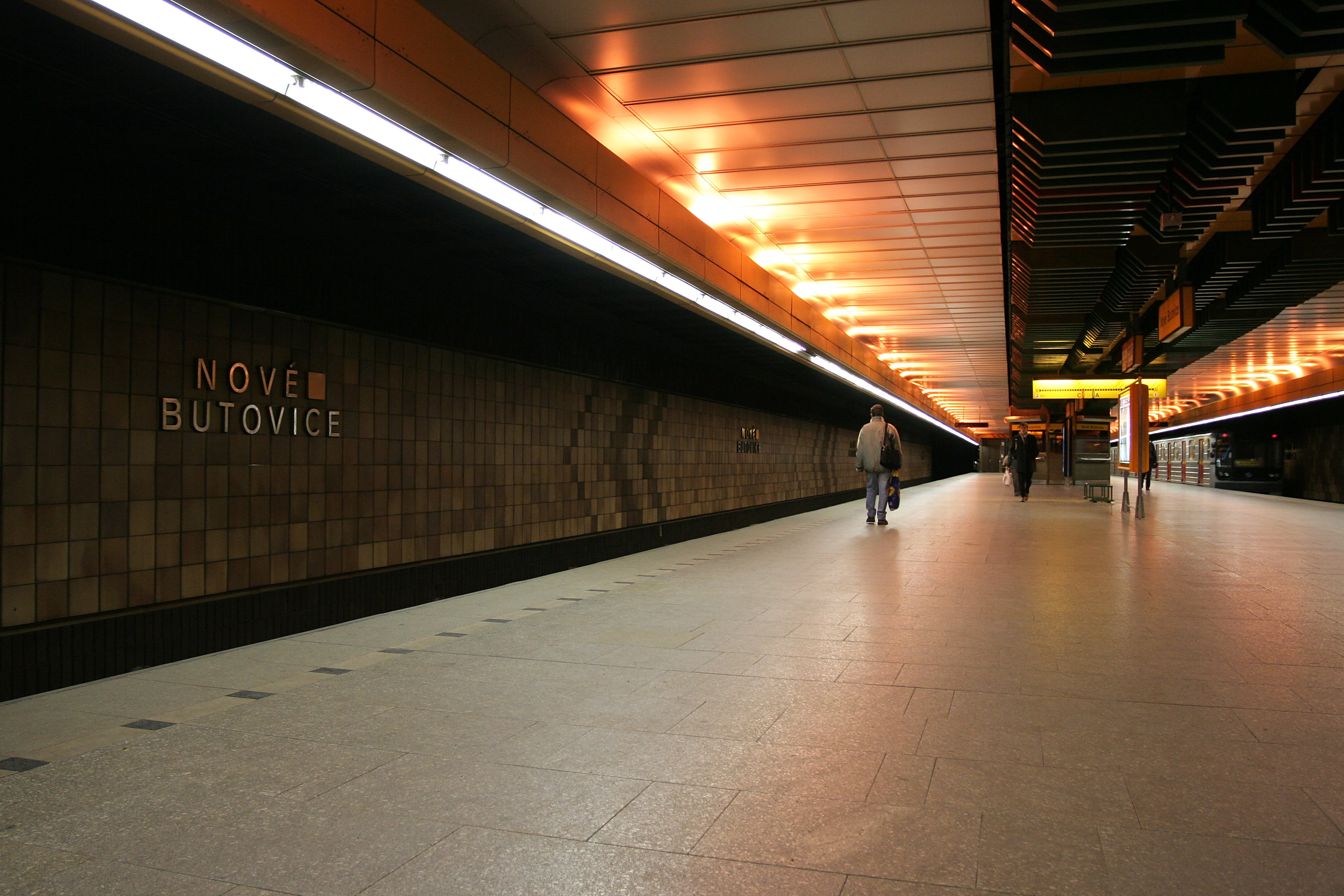
- Nové Butovice metro station

General information
- Location: Bucharova; Prague 13 - Stodůlky; Prague; Czech Republic
- Coordinates: 50.051°N 14.352°E
- System: Prague Metro
- Owner: Dopravní podnik hl. m. Prahy
- Line: B
- Platforms: Island platform
- Tracks: 2

Construction
- Structure type: Underground
- Depth: 53 m (174 ft)
- Platform levels: 1
- Cycle facilities: No
- Accessible: Yes

Other information
- Fare zone: PID: P

History
- Opened: 26 October 1988; 37 years ago

Services
Preceding station	Prague Metro	Following station
Hůrka toward Zličín	Line B	Jinonice toward Černý Most
Location
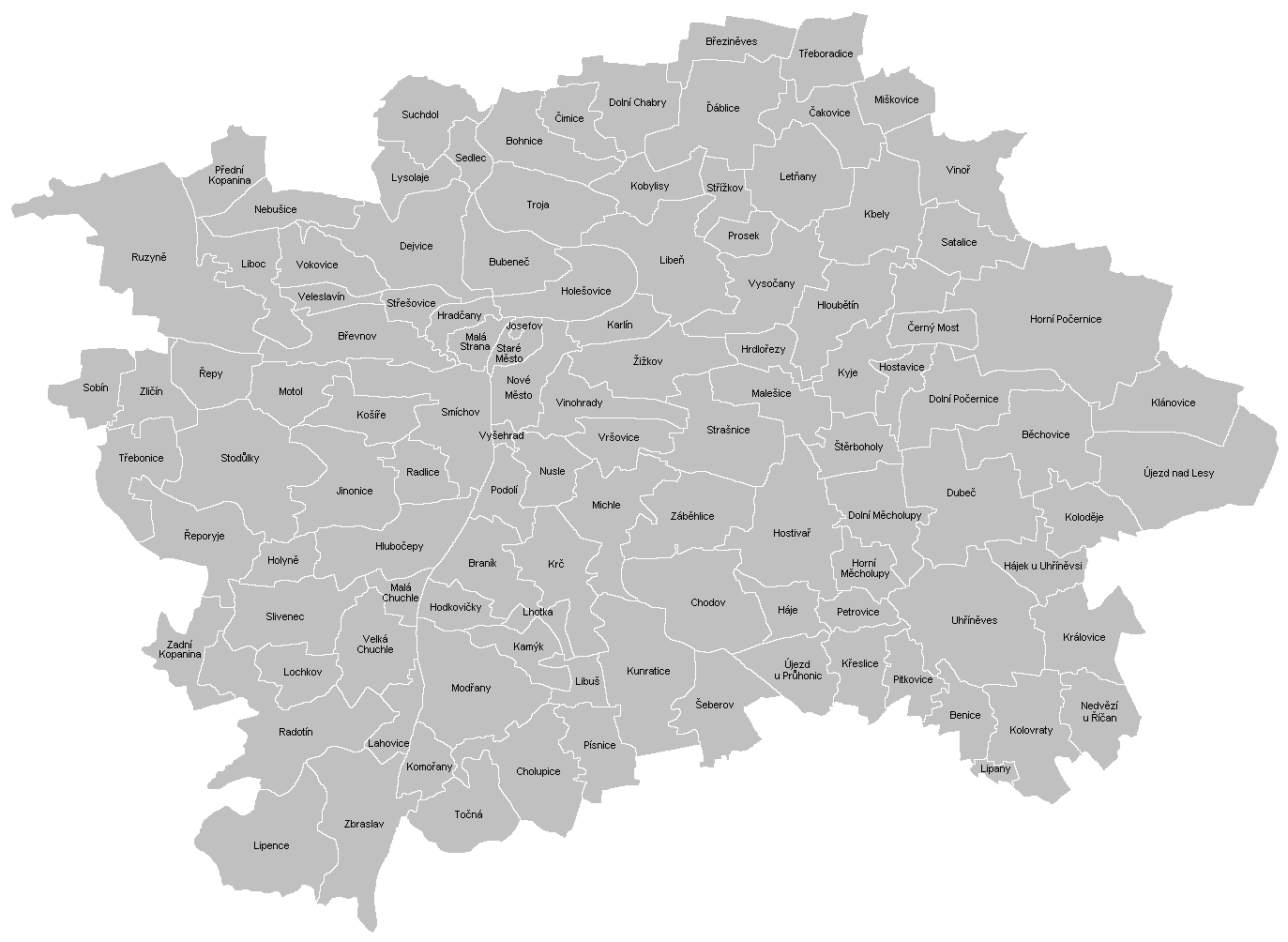
- Location within Prague Location within Greater Prague Location within Czech Republic

Nové Butovice (Czech pronunciation: [ˈnovɛː ˈbutovɪtsɛ]) is a Prague Metro station on Line B, located in Stodůlky, Prague 13. It was opened on 26 October 1988 as the western terminus of the extension of the line from Smíchovské nádraží. On 11 November 1994 the line was extended further to Zličín.
