= Sobín =

Coordinates: 50°03′56″N 14°16′01″E

- Cadastral Area of Prague
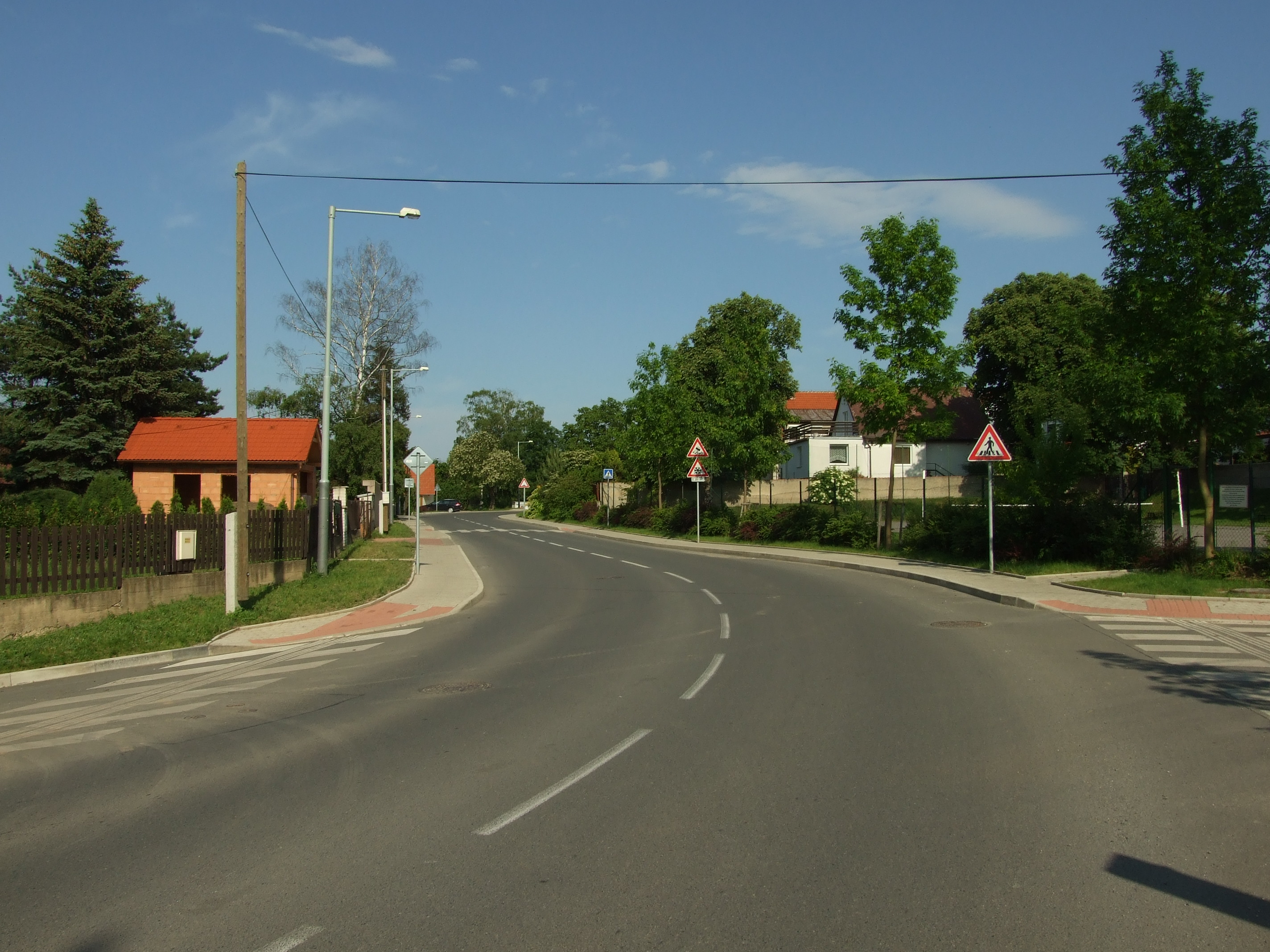
- Hostivická street

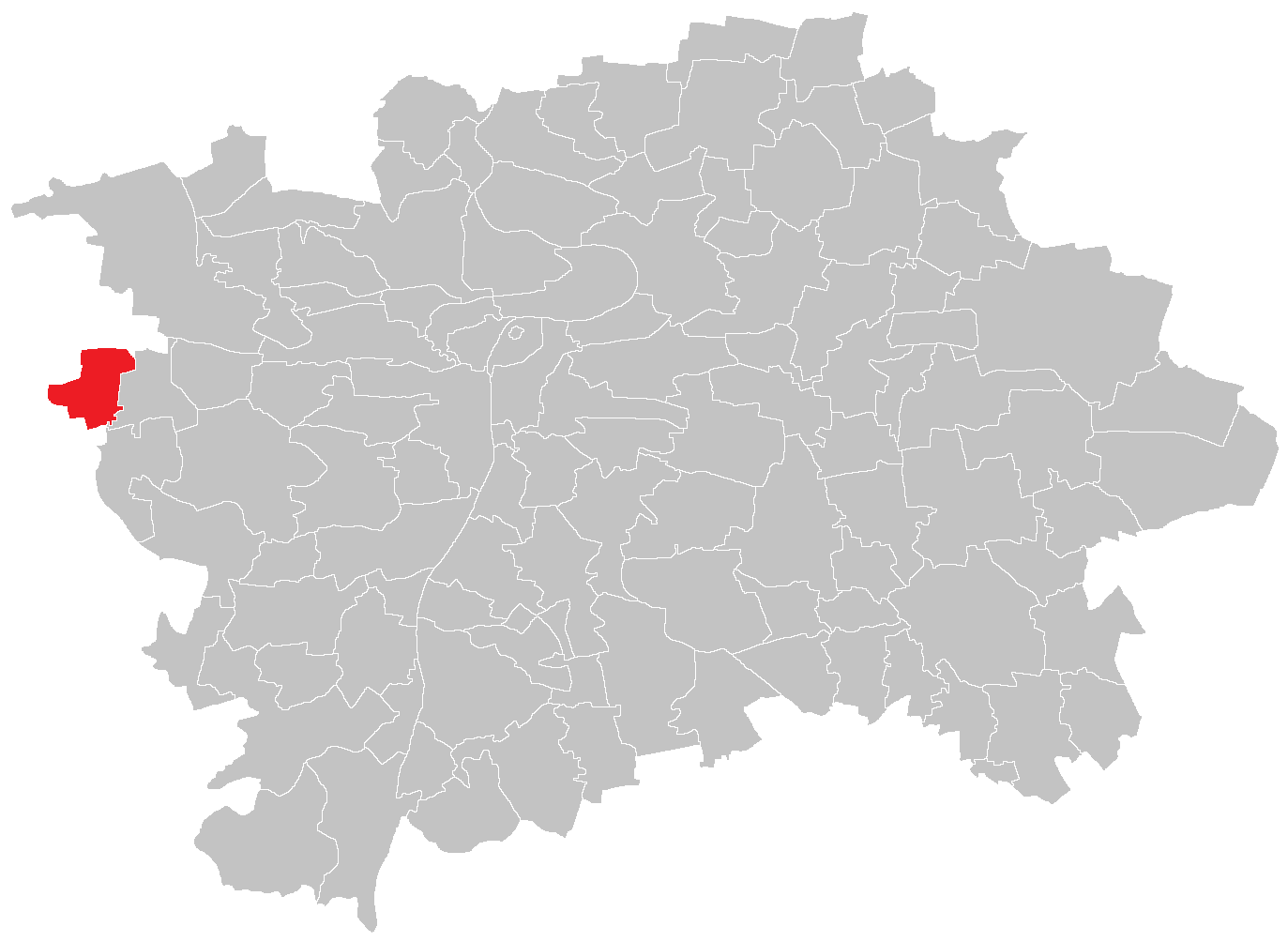
- Location of Sobín in Prague
- Country: Czech Republic
- Region: Prague
- District: Prague 5

Population (2021)
  - Total: 677
- Time zone: UTC+1 (CET)
  - Summer (DST): UTC+2 (CEST)

Sobín is a cadastral area of Prague, Czech Republic and one of its quarters. It is a small village with population of 677. It is part of the district of Prague 6 and of the administrative district of Prague 17.

The hill of Teleček, which is the highest point of Prague (399 meters above sea level), lies in the cadestral area.
