= Jinonice =

District of Prague, Czech Republic

- Cadastral Area of Prague
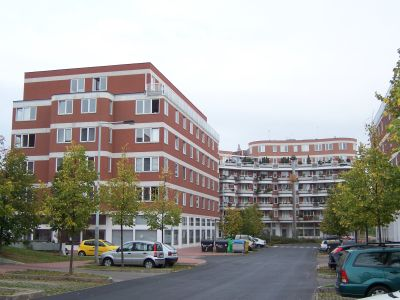
- Buildings of the Charles University in Jinonice

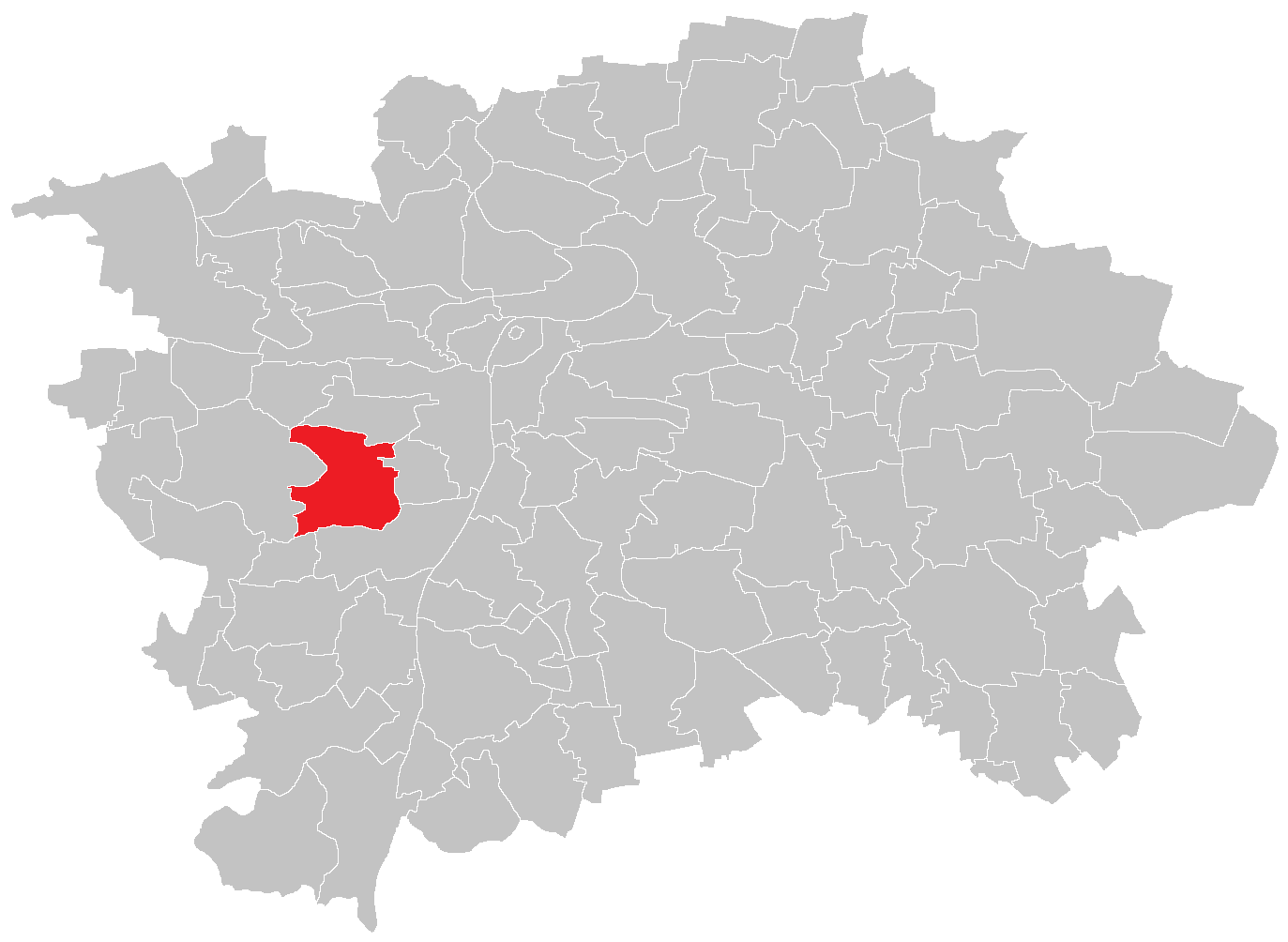
- Location of Jinonice in Prague
- Coordinates: 50°03′04″N 14°21′56″E
- Country: Czech Republic
- Region: Prague
- District: Prague 5, Prague 13

Area
  - Total: 6.17 km^{2} (2.38 sq mi)

Population (2021)
  - Total: 7,556
  - Density: 1,220/km^{2} (3,170/sq mi)
- Time zone: UTC+1 (CET)
  - Summer (DST): UTC+2 (CEST)
- Postal code: 158 00

Jinonice is a cadastral district of Prague, mostly part of Prague 5, but a small area is part of Prague 13. It is located on the north edge of Prokopské údolí national park. Jinonice has been a part of Prague city since 1922.

Part of Jinonice is also the historical Slavic settlement Hradiště Butovice from the 9th century.

The most important local historical monument is the Church of St. Lawrence (Kostel svatého Vavřince), which was built in Romanesque style at the end of the 11th century.

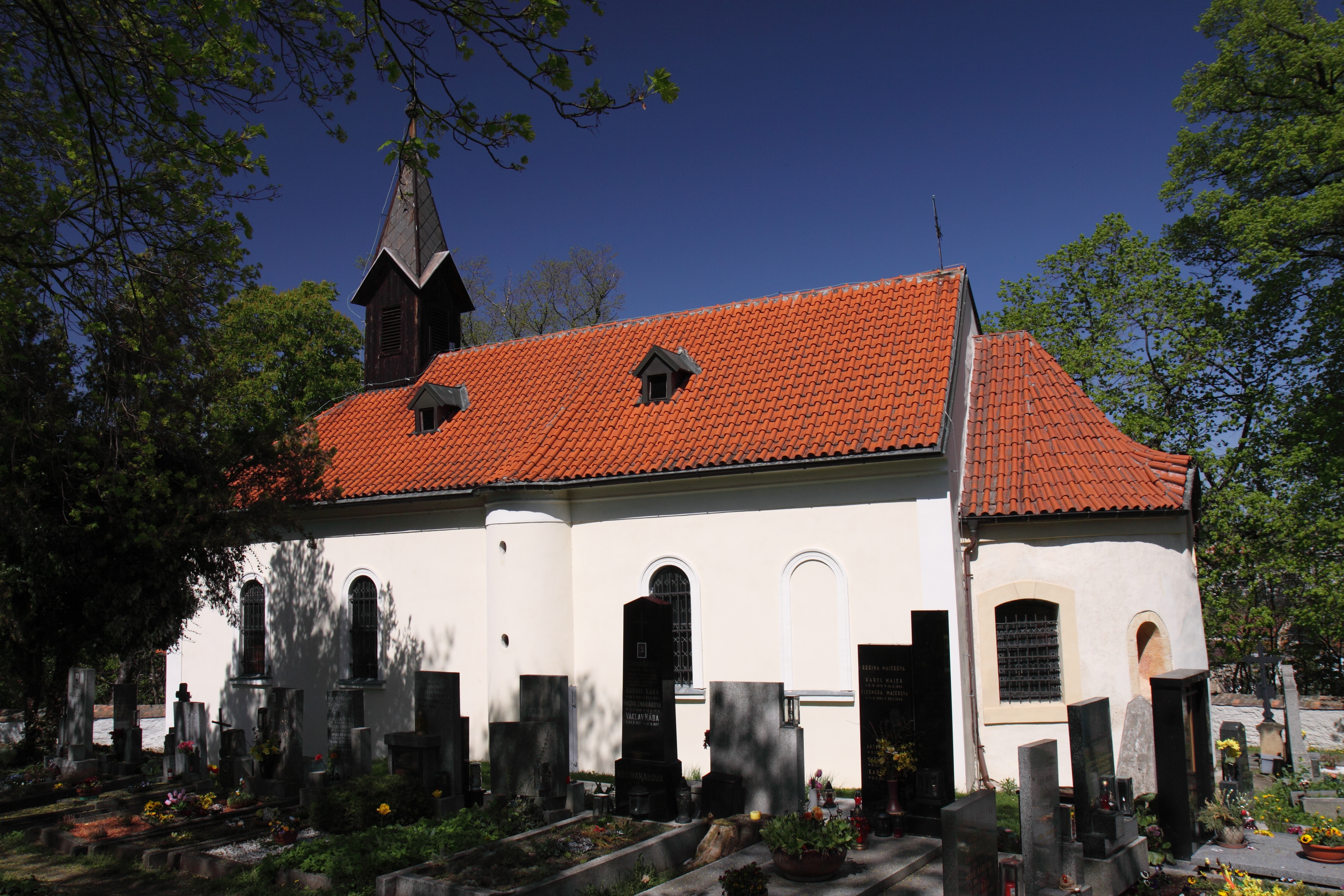
Church of St. Lawrence (sv. Vavřince)

In 1872, the Smíchov–Hostivice railway line was built. The area is also served by Jinonice metro station on line B of the Prague Metro.

== Demographics ==
Historical population

Year	Pop.	±%
1869	923	—
1880	1,225	+32.7%
1890	1,581	+29.1%
1900	2,053	+29.9%
1910	2,234	+8.8%
1921	2,260	+1.2%
1930	5,025	+122.3%
1950	5,459	+8.6%

Year	Pop.	±%
1961	4,028	−26.2%
1970	3,136	−22.1%
1980	2,381	−24.1%
1991	2,239	−6.0%
2001	2,962	+32.3%
2011	5,488	+85.3%
2021	7,556	+37.7%

Source: Censuses

== Education ==
The Deutsche Schule Prag, the German international school, is in the district.

=== Gallery ===
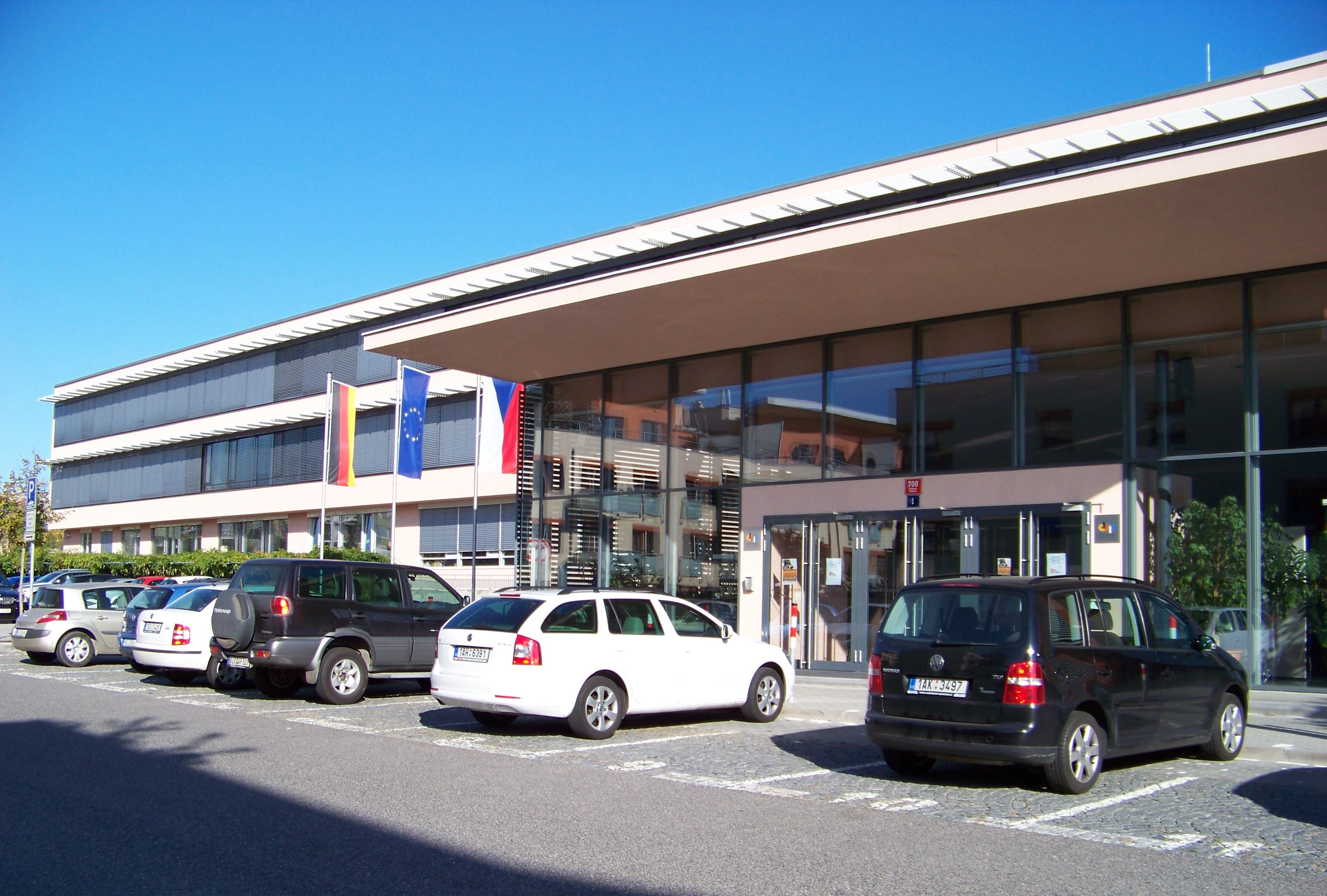
Deutsche Schule Prag

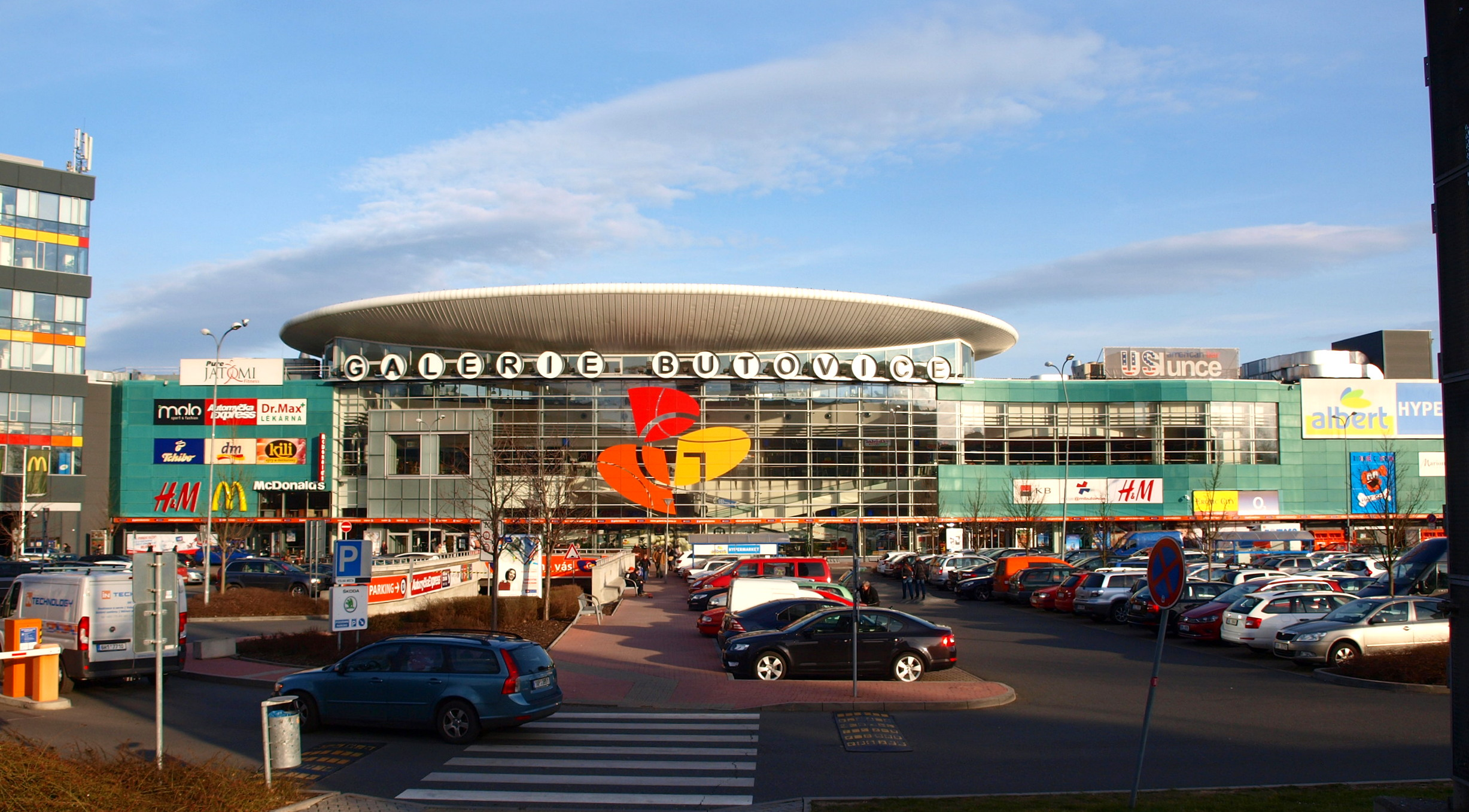
Shopping center Galerie Nové Butovice

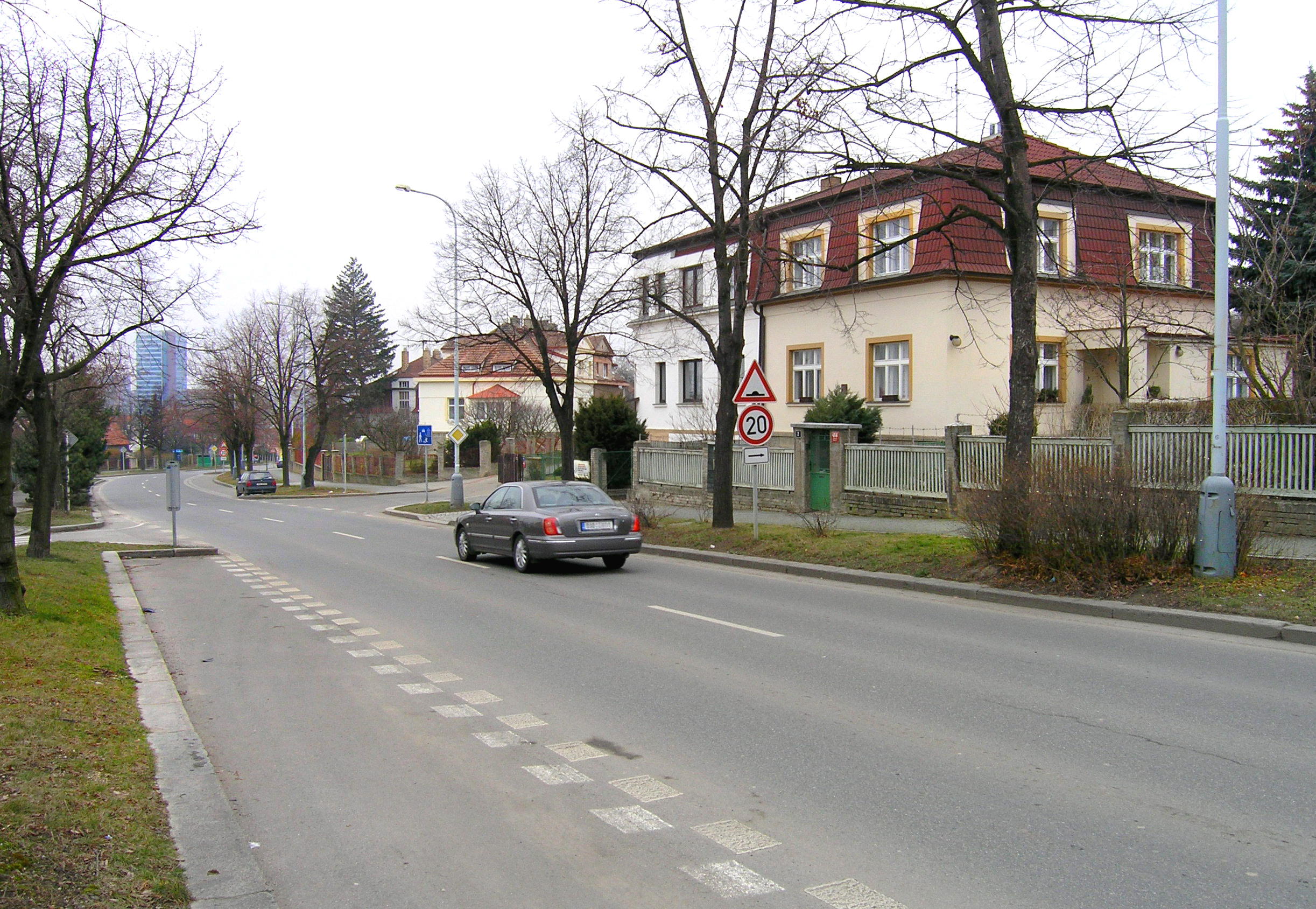
Karlštejnská street

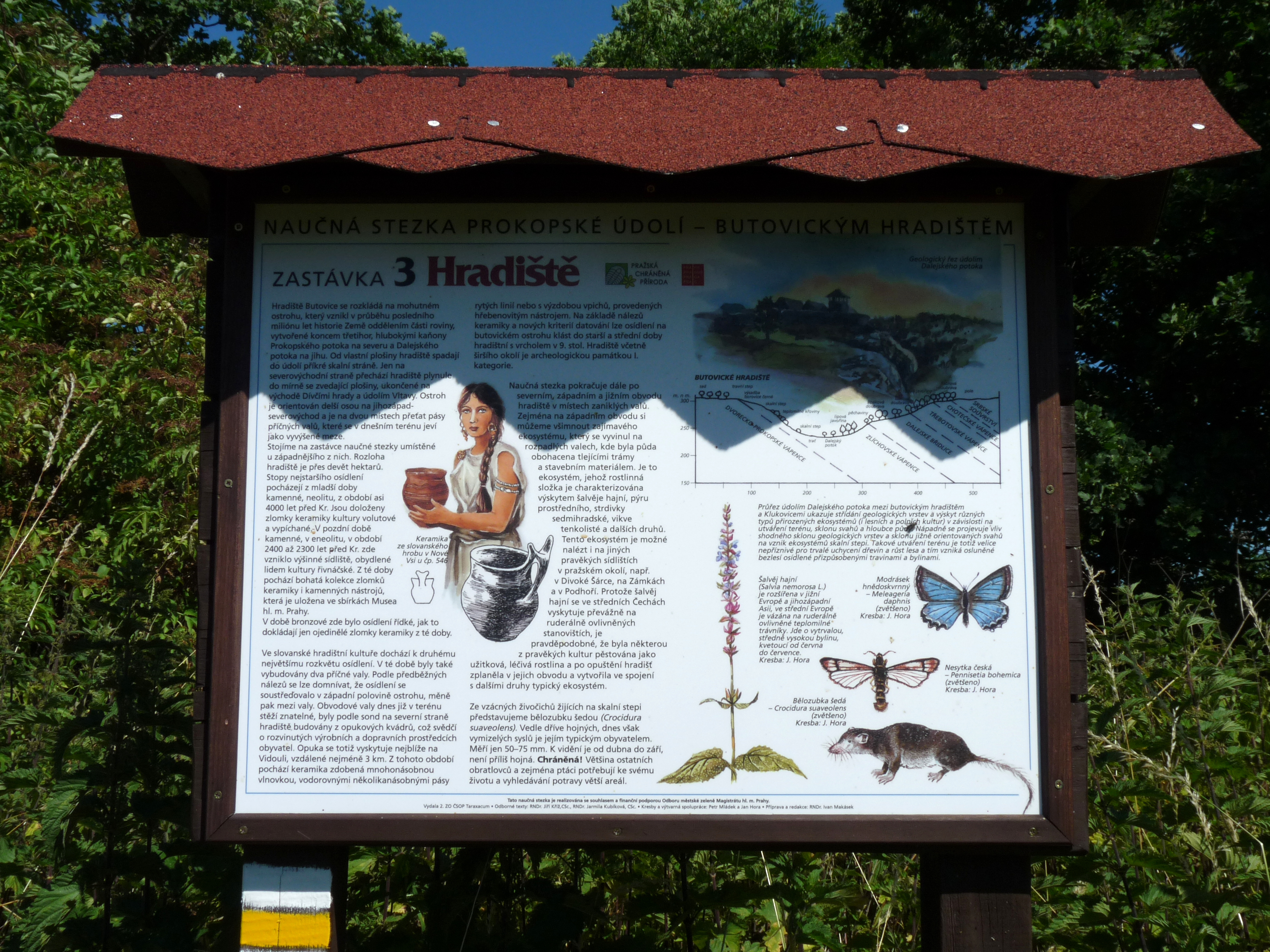
Educational trail of settlement Hradiště Butovice
