= Motol (Prague) =

- Cadastral Area of Prague
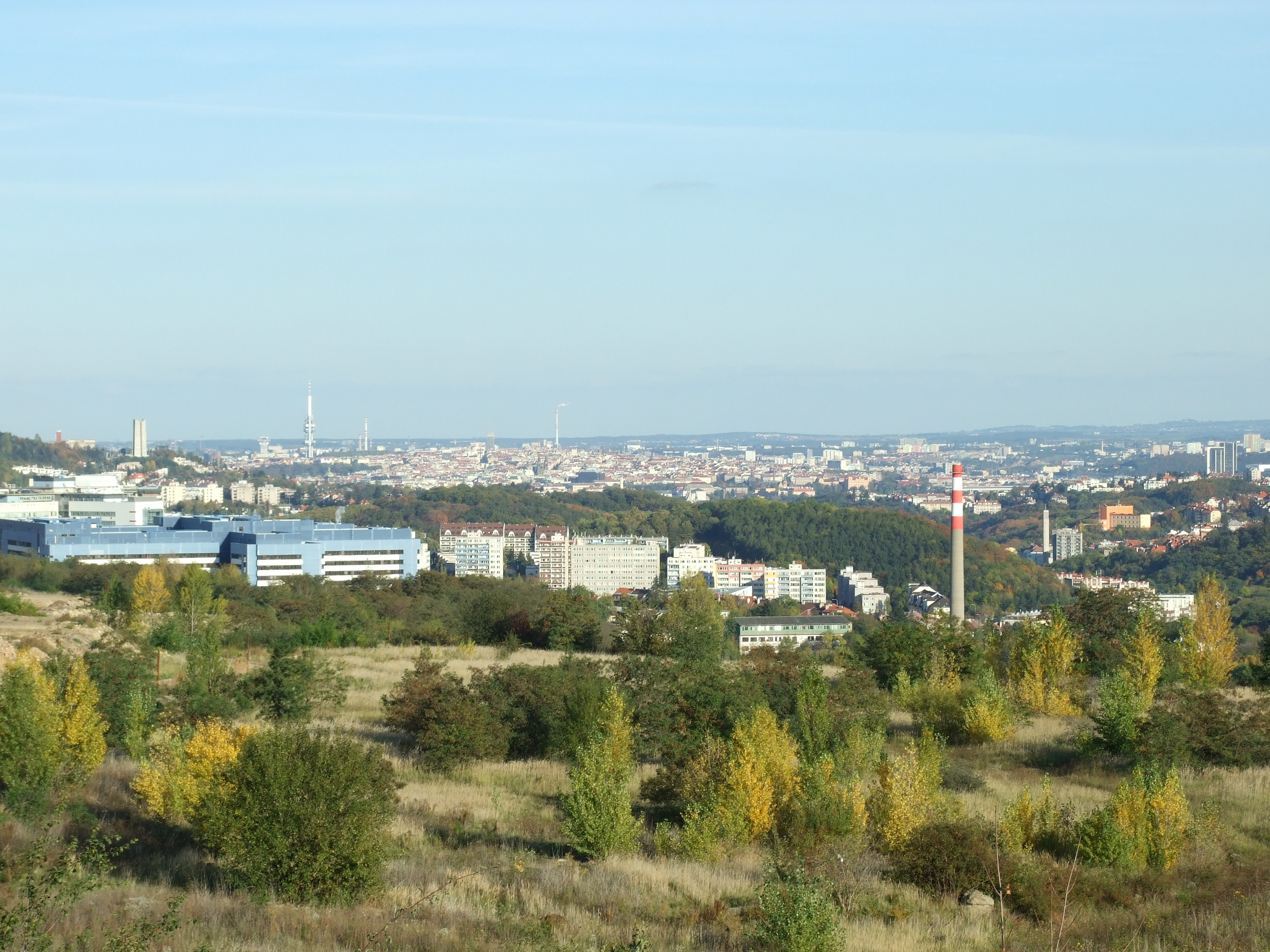
- View of Motol

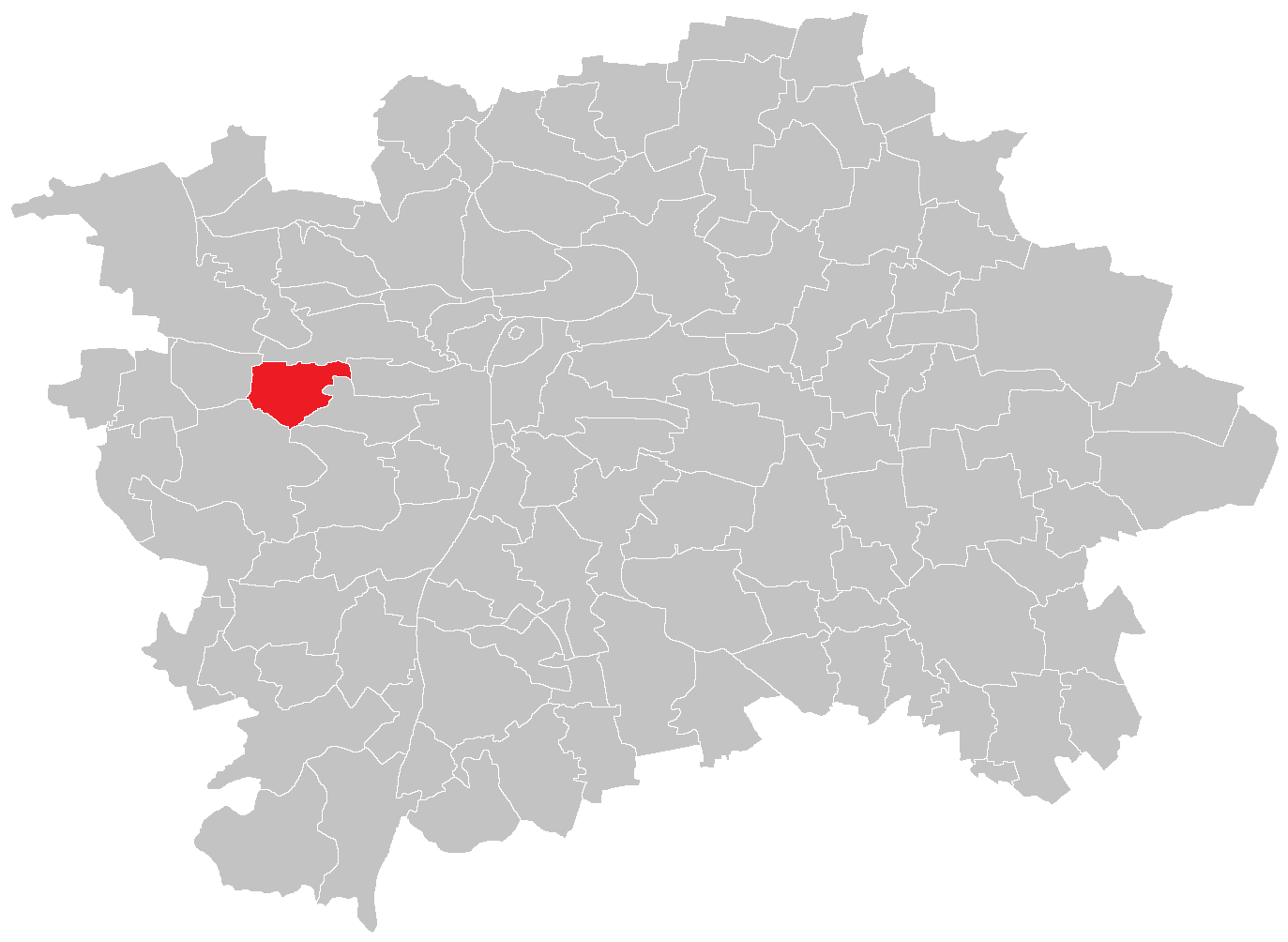
- Location of Motol in Prague
- Coordinates: 50°4′12″N 14°20′24″E
- Country: Czech Republic
- Region: Prague
- District: Prague 5

Area
  - Total: 3.19 km^{2} (1.23 sq mi)

Population (2021)
  - Total: 3,973
  - Density: 1,250/km^{2} (3,230/sq mi)
- Time zone: UTC+1 (CET)
  - Summer (DST): UTC+2 (CEST)

Motol is a cadastral area of Prague, the capital of the Czech Republic. It is located in the administrative district of Prague 5.

It is the location of Motol University Hospital, a large teaching hospital.

== Demographics ==
Historical population

Year	Pop.	±%
1869	255	—
1880	263	+3.1%
1890	310	+17.9%
1900	354	+14.2%
1910	273	−22.9%
1921	722	+164.5%
1930	2,403	+232.8%
1950	3,218	+33.9%

Year	Pop.	±%
1961	1,778	−44.7%
1970	1,314	−26.1%
1980	2,980	+126.8%
1991	3,272	+9.8%
2001	3,379	+3.3%
2011	4,205	+24.4%
2021	3,973	−5.5%

Source: Censuses
