= Sovin, Sarab =

Sovin سوين
- Village
- Location within Iran
- Coordinates: 37°57′07″N 47°42′01″E
- Country: Iran
- Province: East Azerbaijan
- County: Sarab
- Bakhsh: Central
- Rural District: Aghmiyun

Population (2006)
  - Total: 289
- Time zone: UTC+3:30 (IRST)
  - Summer (DST): UTC+4:30 (IRDT)

Sovin (Persian: سوين, also Romanized as Sovīn; also known as Sūyūn) is a village in Aghmiyun Rural District, in the Central District of Sarab County, East Azerbaijan Province, Iran. At the 2006 census, its population was 289, in 77 families.
