= Prague 5 =

Municipality in Czechia

Prague 5 Praha 5
- Municipal District of Prague; Administrative District of Prague
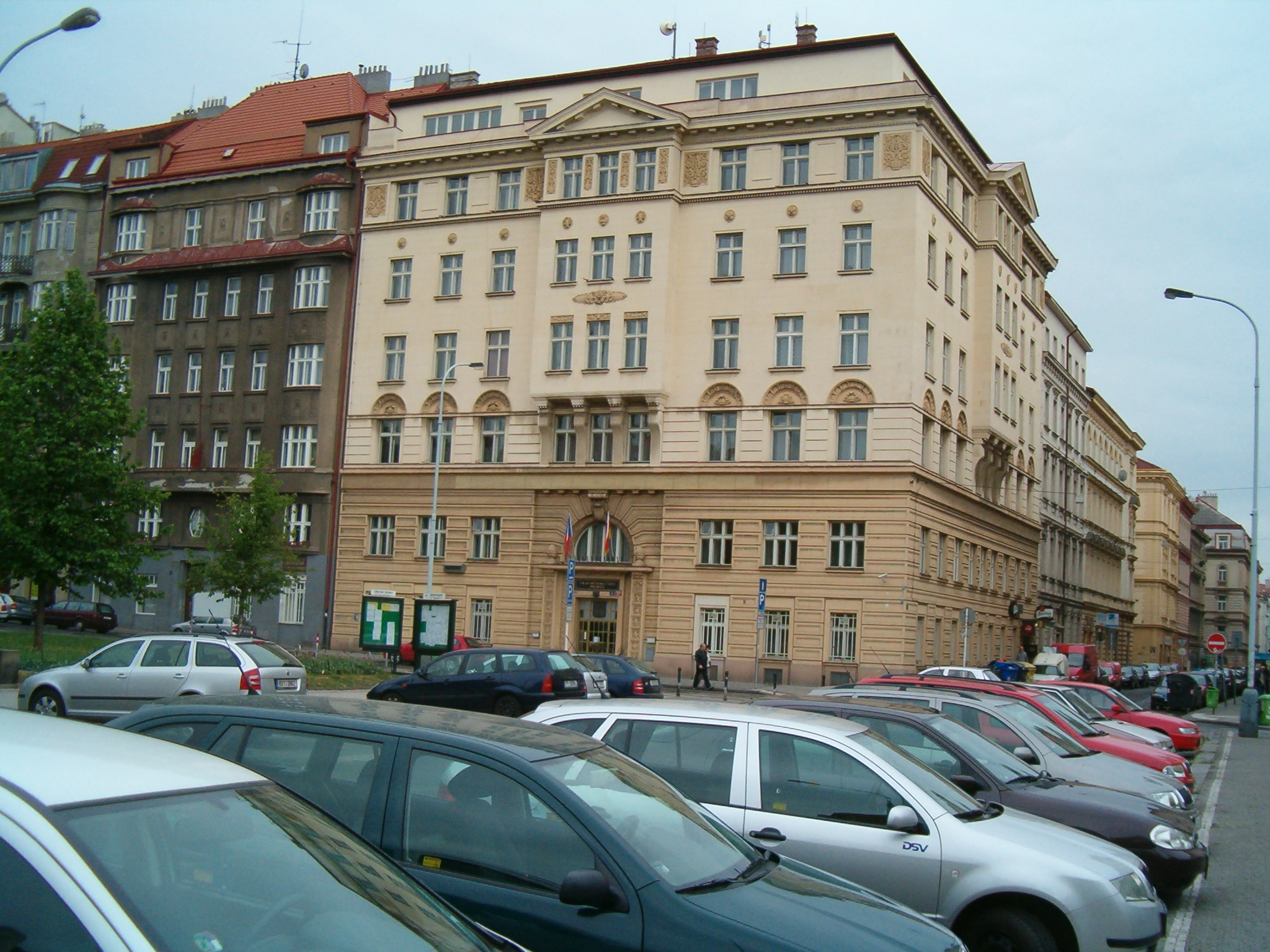
- Town hall of Prague 5

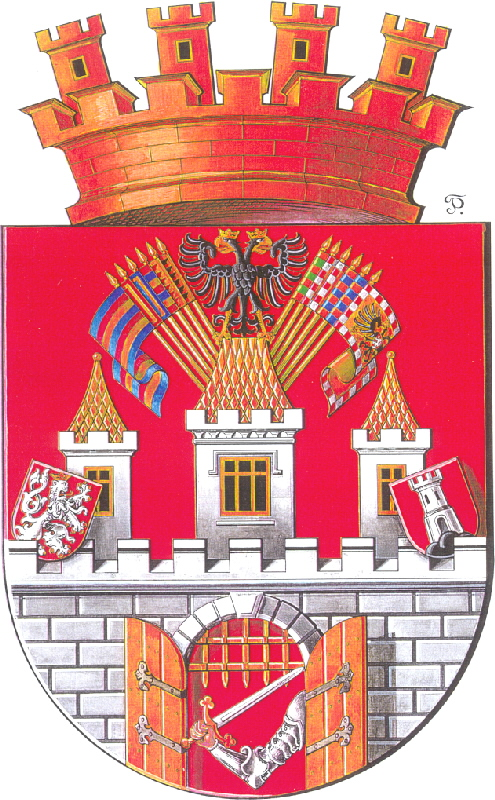
- Flag Coat of arms

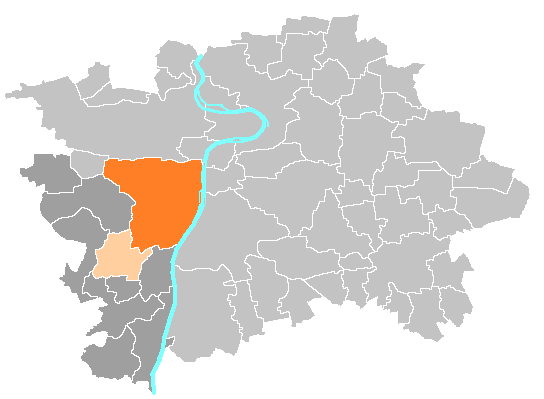
- Location of Prague 5 in Prague
- Coordinates: 50°4′19″N 14°24′14″E
- Country: Czech Republic
- Region: Prague

Government
  - Mayor: Radka Šimková

Area
  - Total: 27.50 km^{2} (10.62 sq mi)

Population (2021)
  - Total: 89,007
  - Density: 3,237/km^{2} (8,383/sq mi)
- Time zone: UTC+1 (CET)
  - Summer (DST): UTC+2 (CEST)
- Postal code: 150 00
- Website: http://www.praha5.cz

Prague 5 refers to a unit used in several different administrative divisions of the capital city of Prague, each of which has a different territorial definition.

The municipal part Prague 5 consists of the entire cadastral areas of Hlubočepy, Košíře, Motol, Radlice, and Smíchov, as well as parts of the cadastral areas of Jinonice, Malá Strana, and Břevnov.

The administrative district Prague 5 consists of the municipal parts Prague 5 and Prague-Slivenec.

The municipal part Prague 5 consists of the administrative districts Prague 5, Prague 13, Prague 16 and Prague 17 (part).

== Barrandov ==
Barrandov originated as a film producing borough. The film studios, which are active even today, were soon surrounded by many beautiful villas of the First Republic and consequently a small garden town developed. This part of Barrandov is till today considered to be a "good address" in Prague. Most important landmarks besides the Barrandov Film Studios are the Barrandov Terraces (Barrandovské Terasy), a former functional luxury restaurant with a splendid view on Vltava river.

New Barrandov is noted for its unique tram stations. The Hlubočepy-Sídliště Barrandov route (tram no.20, 12 or 14) was opened in 2003. Architect Patrik Kotas designed the ultra-modern stations that create a unique feature from the boring, grey walls.

== Smíchov ==
Textile factories, breweries, railway carriages – the industrial history of Prague was written in Smíchov. Today, the industrial era is recalled only by the sizeable area of the Staropramen Brewery. Smíchov has undergone a remarkable change during the past few years. This workers’ district has been transformed into a district of ultra-modern offices, shopping centres and multiplex cinemas. The central point is the crossroads called Anděl and the Metro station of the same name. How did this place get its name? There once used to be a classicistic building with a brewery, adorned by a painted fresco of an angel which, however, had to make way for the construction of the Prague Metro in 1980. Also in the neighbourhoods: The Anděl Media Centre, which is the site of the editorial offices of Mladá Fronta Dnes, Lidové Noviny, and Rádio Expres.

== Malá Strana ==
Prague 5 covers also 4% of Malá Strana and it is only the few blocks of buildings which were part of the former village Ujezd, today surrounded by Vítězná Street, Janáčkov Embankment, Petřínská, Mělnická, Plaská Streets, as well as a part of the Vltava near the bridge Most Legí.

== Further quarters with special landmarks ==
- Radlice and Košíře - quiet centrally located residential areas with ancient mansions and family homes
- Chuchle - noted for its horseracing events on the Prague racecourse Velká Chuchle
- Zličín - big industrial area located at the motorways with many shopping centres
- Slivenec - the přídolí epoch in the Silurian Period of geological time is named for rocks in Přídolí nature reserve near Slivenec.

== Demographics ==
Historical population

Year	Pop.	±%
1869	20,132	—
1880	32,347	+60.7%
1890	44,567	+37.8%
1900	63,988	+43.6%
1910	74,129	+15.8%

Year	Pop.	±%
1921	78,333	+5.7%
1930	92,691	+18.3%
1950	95,141	+2.6%
1961	98,521	+3.6%
1970	85,106	−13.6%

Year	Pop.	±%
1980	78,441	−7.8%
1991	76,768	−2.1%
2001	77,170	+0.5%
2011	83,968	+8.8%
2021	89,007	+6.0%

Source: Censuses

== Education ==
International schools include:

- Lycée Français de Prague (Smíchov)
- Deutsche Schule Prag (Jinonice)

== International relations ==
=== Twin towns – Sister cities ===
Prague 5 district is twinned with:

- Újbuda, Budapest, Hungary

== See also ==
- Districts of Prague#Symbols
