= Můstek =

Prague metro station

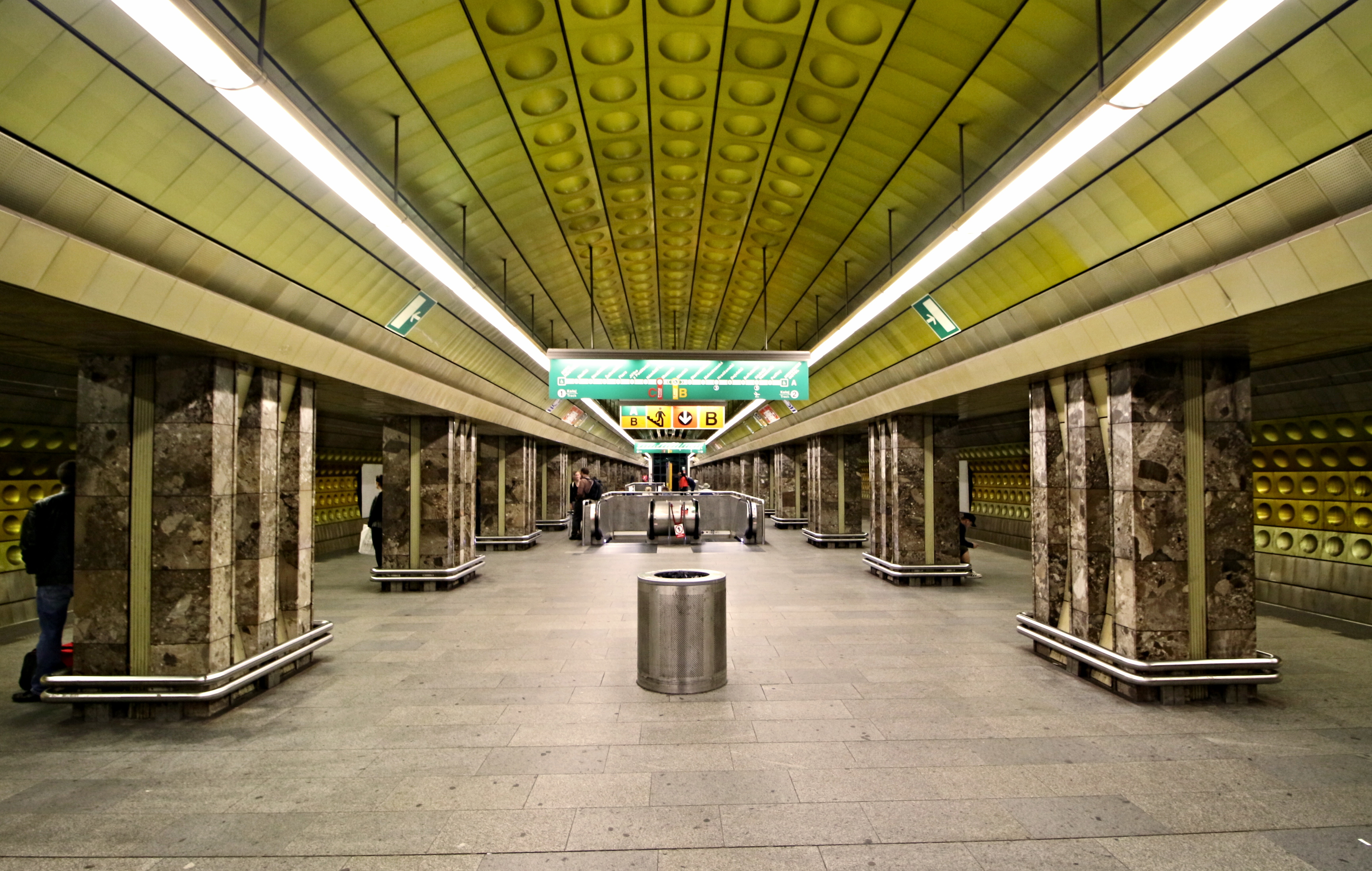
- Line A platform

General information
- Location: New Town; Prague 1 Czech Republic
- Coordinates: 50.0842°N 14.4233°E
- System: Prague Metro
- Owner: Dopravní podnik hl. m. Prahy
- Platforms: 2 island platforms
- Tracks: 4

Construction
- Structure type: Underground
- Depth: A: 29,3 metres B: 40,3 metres
- Platform levels: 2
- Parking: No
- Cycle facilities: No
- Accessible: Yes (both stations)

History
- Opened: A 12 August 1978; 48 years ago B 2 November 1985; 40 years ago

Services
Preceding station	Prague Metro	Following station
Staroměstská toward Nemocnice Motol	Line A	Muzeum toward Depo Hostivař
Národní třída toward Zličín	Line B	Náměstí Republiky toward Černý Most
Location
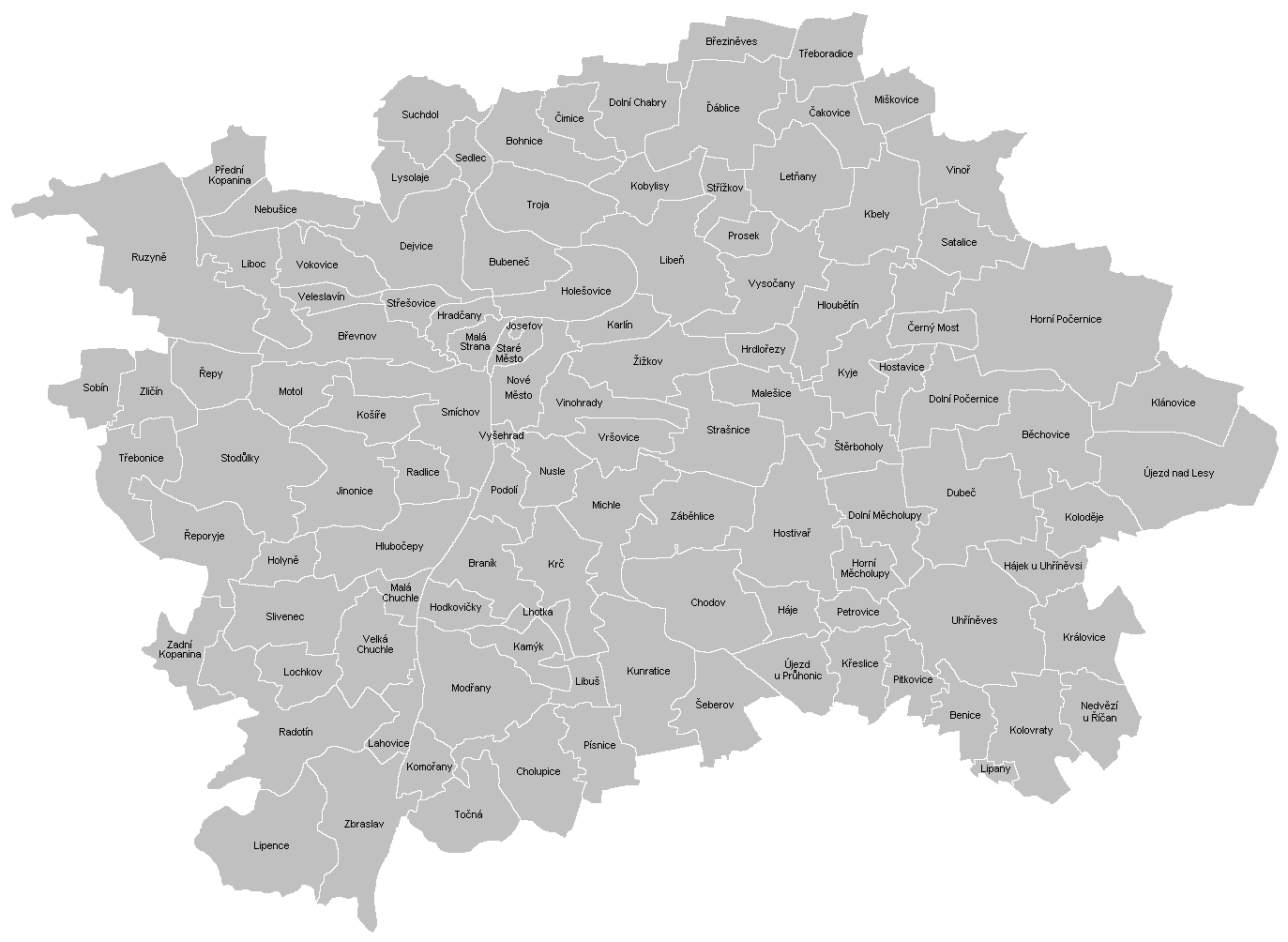
- Location within Greater Prague

Můstek (Czech pronunciation: [ˈmuːstɛk]) is a Prague Metro station that serves as an interchange point between lines A and B, situated under the lower end of Wenceslas Square. Each line has a separate set of platforms which are connected by a series of corridors. After the excavation of the area, a medieval bridge was discovered and the meaning of the area name Můstek ("Little Bridge") was fully understood.

The Line A station was opened on 12 August 1978 as part of the inaugural section of Line A, between Leninova and Náměstí Míru. The line B station was opened on 2 November 1985, as part of the inaugural section of Line B between Sokolovská and Smíchovské nádraží.

Můstek A has two exits through escalator tunnels (one on both ends of the middle aisle) with one vestibule below lower (NW) end of the Wenceslas Square where the preserved medieval bridge can be seen and the other below the central part of the square. A system of corridors connects the station of Line A with station of Line B located roughly in the same location, but several metres deeper. Můstek B has one escalator tunnel with a vestibule below Jungmann Square.

The station was renovated in 2015.

== Gallery ==
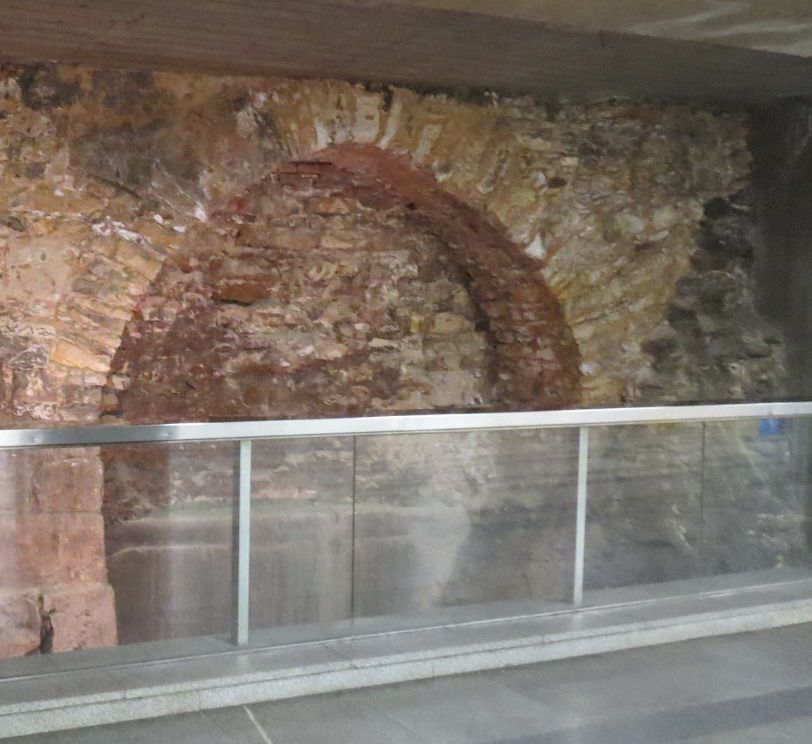
Old bridge in the underground part of metro Můstek

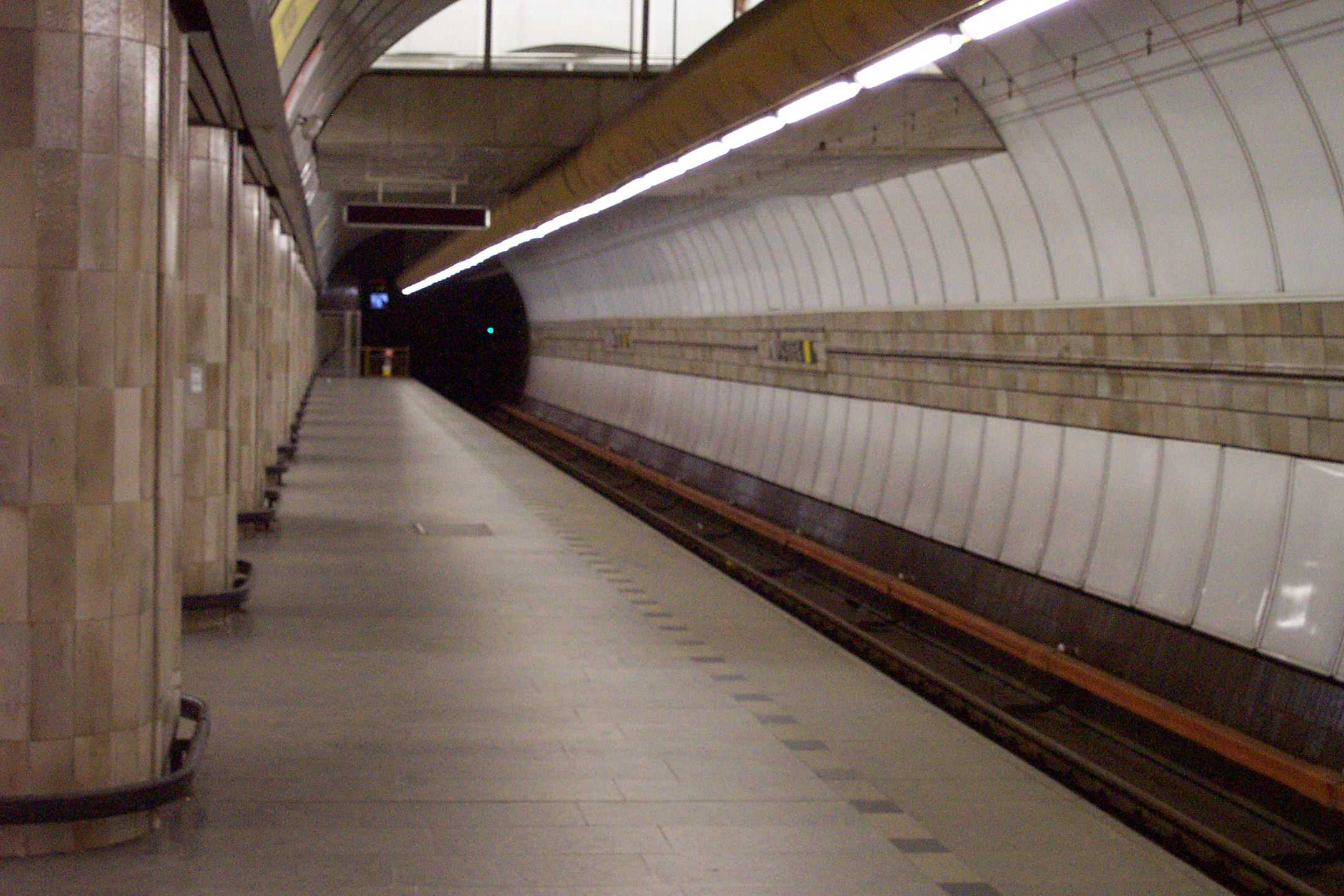
Můstek metro station, platform on Line B

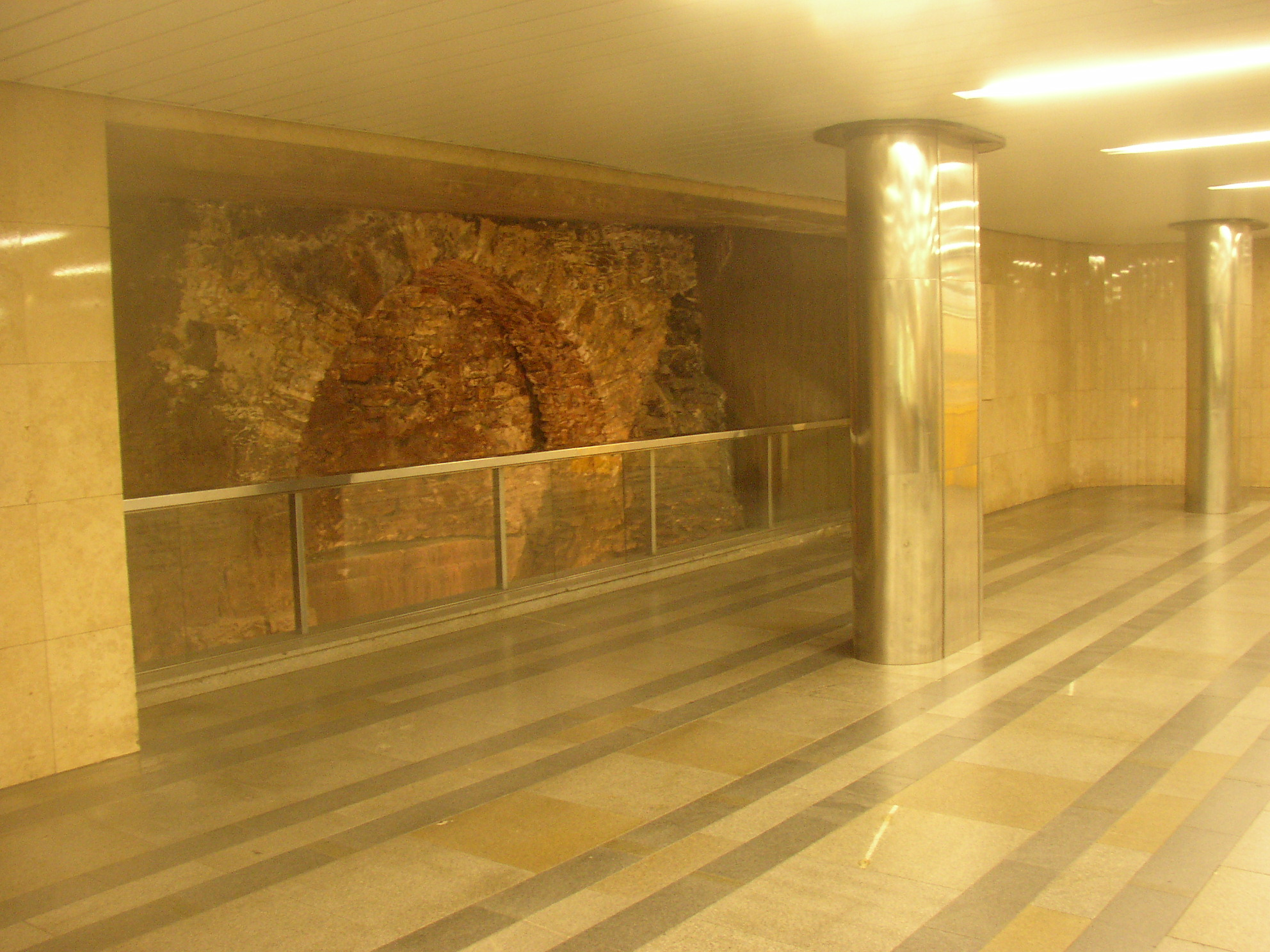
Preserved medieval bridge between Old and New Town of Prague in vestibule of Line A station.

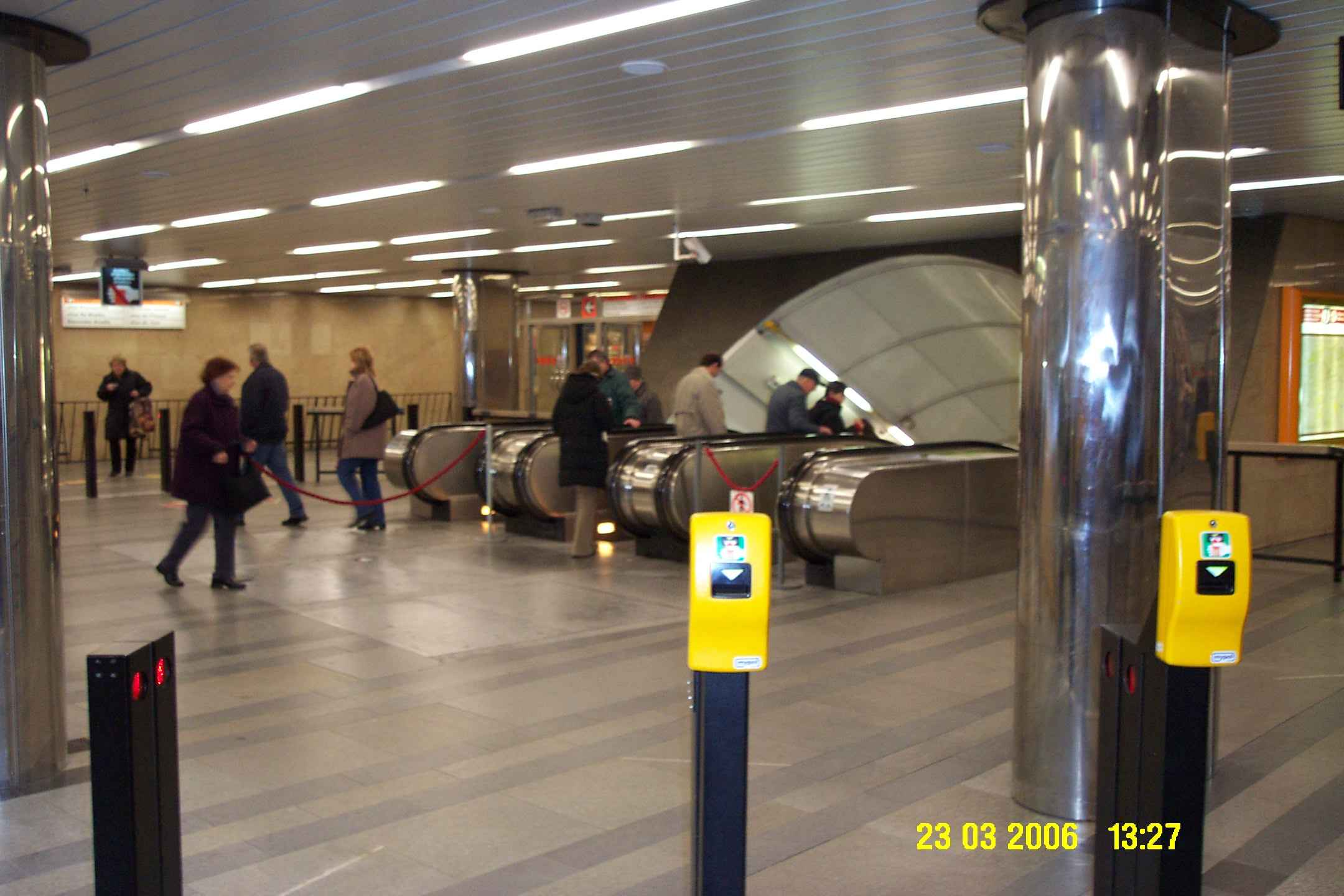
Line A vestibule

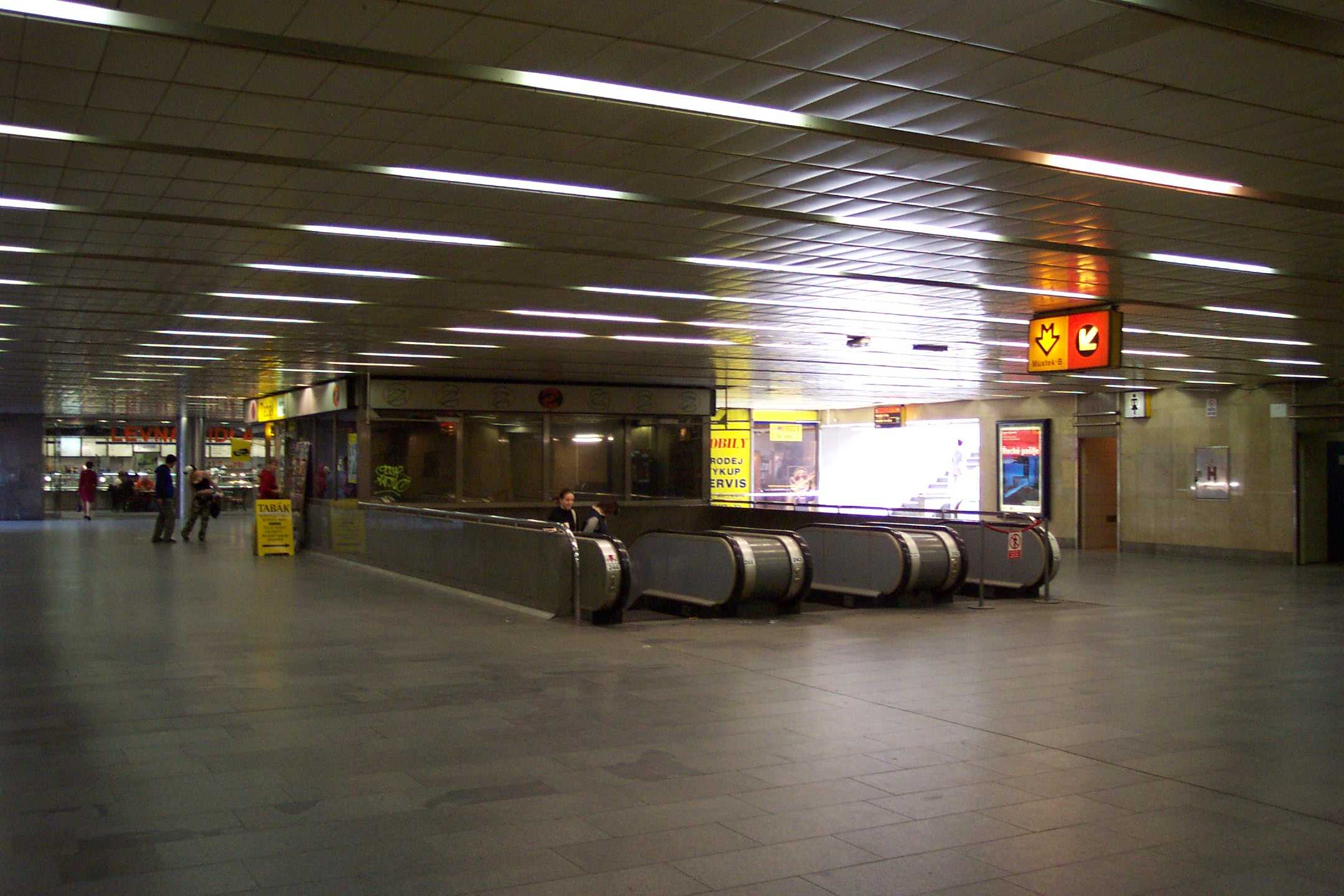
Line B vestibule
