= Jan Palach Square =

Town square in Prague, Czech Republic

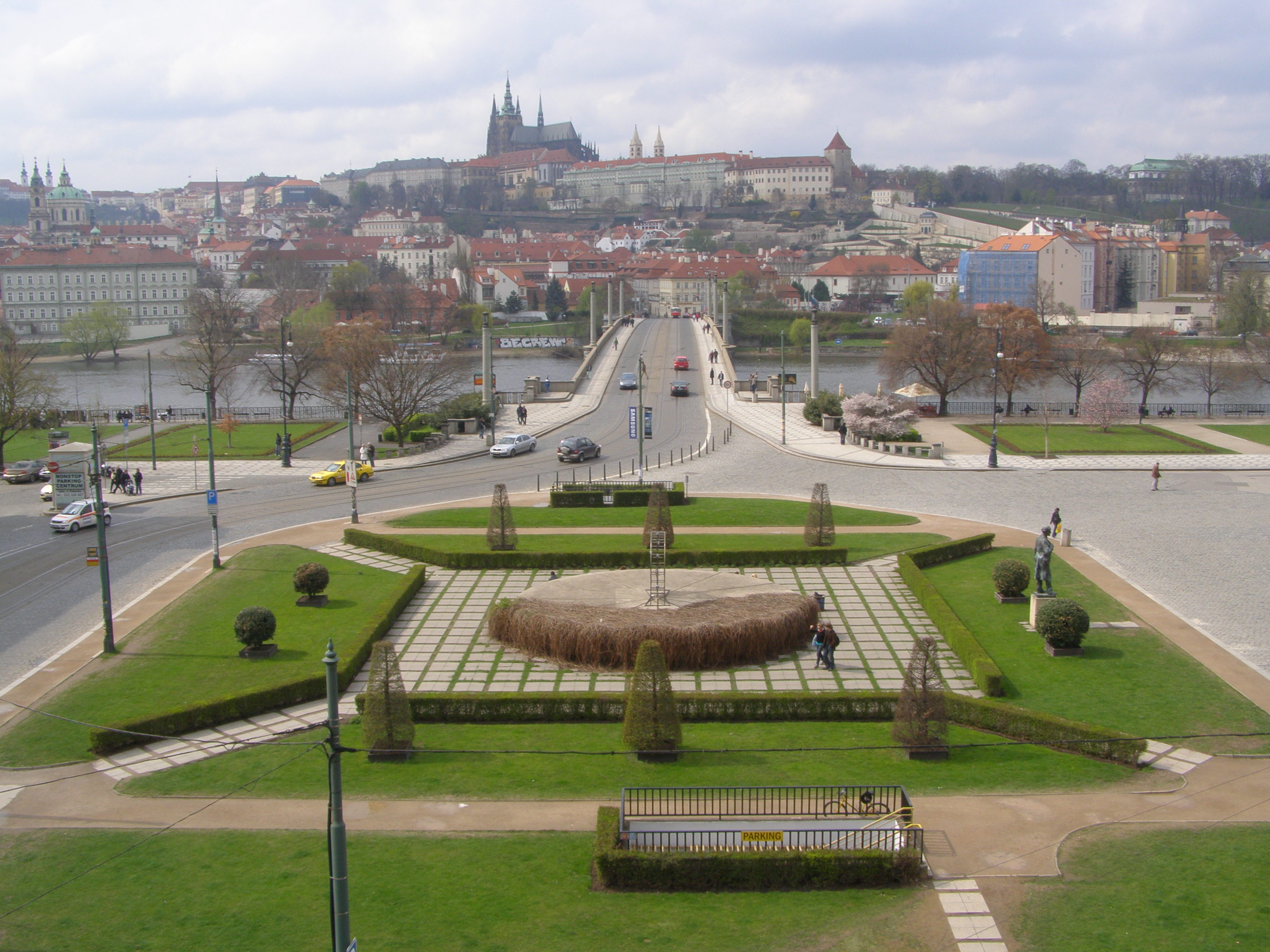
Jan Palach Square

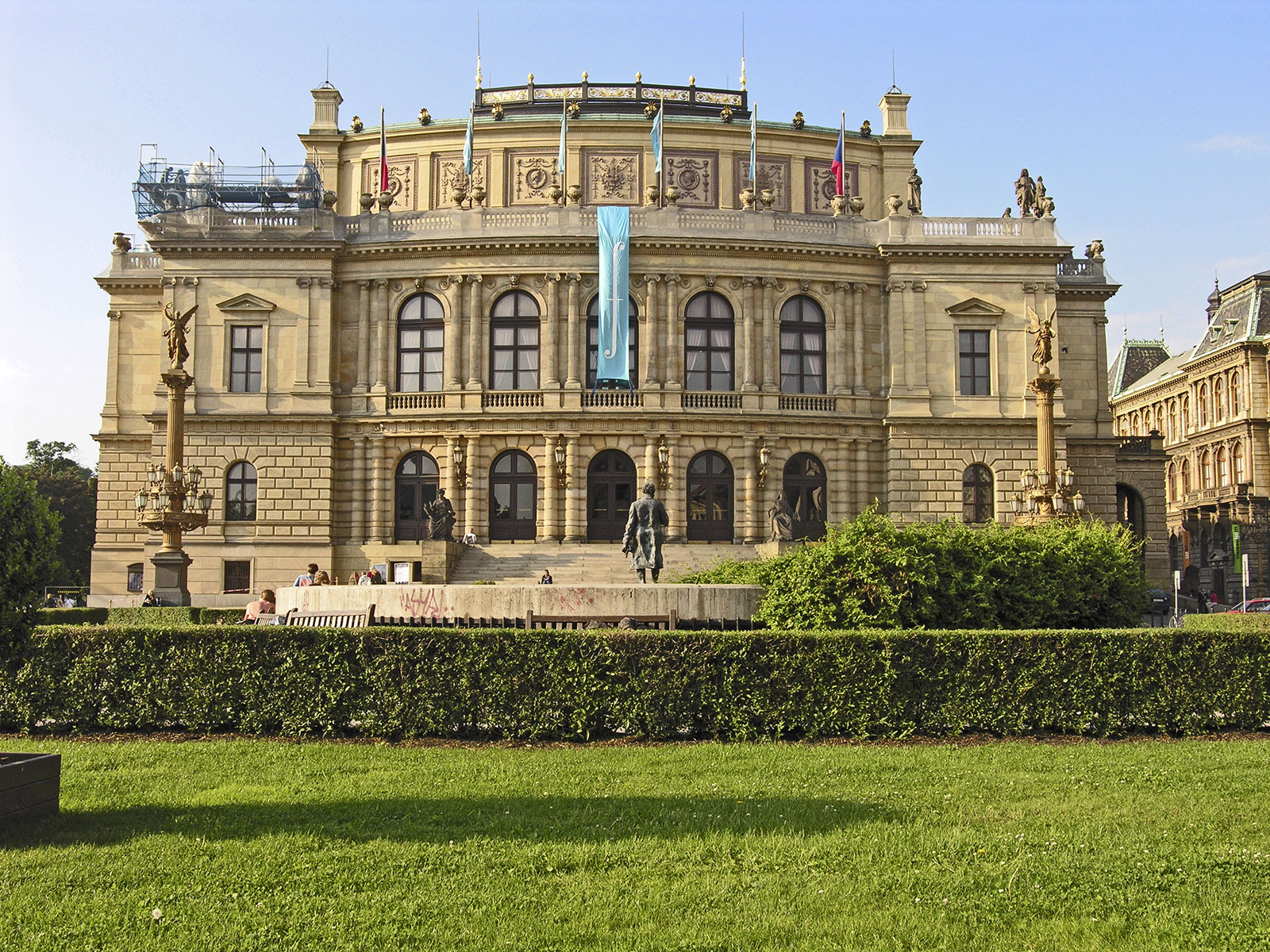
Rudolfinum with statue of Antonín Dvořák.

Jan Palach Square (Czech: Náměstí Jana Palacha) is a town square in the Old Town of Prague. It is located on right bank of the Vltava River next to the former Jewish Quarter.

== Buildings and structures ==
The western side of the square is adjacent to the Vltava River. The Mánes Bridge (1911–1916) connects Jan Palach Square to Malá Strana (Lesser Town) on the opposite bank. This side of the square also offers a good view of Prague Castle, Petřín Hill and Charles Bridge. On the north there is the Neo-Renaissance Rudolfinum Concert Hall (1876–1884). The building on the eastern side (1924–1930) houses the Faculty of Arts (Czech: Filozofická fakulta) of Charles University, and the building on the southern side (1885) belongs to the Academy of Arts, Architecture and Design (Czech: Vysoká škola umělecko-průmyslová).

There is a large underground parking garage under the square, with surface structures of this facility slightly disturbing the overall impression of the square. Monuments to two personalities of Czech culture are situated here—a statue of composer Antonín Dvořák in front of Rudolfinum and a statue of painter Josef Mánes closer to the river.

== History and names of the square ==
Test drilling in front of the Rudolfinum, between 1890 and 1921, photo by Rudolf Bruner-Dvořák

The previous name of the square, used through the communist era, was the Square of Red Army Soldiers (Náměstí Krasnoarmějců) from the year 1948, commemorating Soviet soldiers killed during their liberation of Prague in May 1945. The place however had many names through the history, as it was an important intersection since middle ages when there was an entrance to the main ford connecting both sides of the river and thus both parts of the city.

In the late modern period the place was known as Rejdiště after riding hall standing in the place. But when a new prominent building of Rudolfinum Concert Hall was constructed and the square got its shape, it was also named after the Crown Prince Rudolf. During the World War I it was renamed Empress Zita Square in honour of the new (and the last) Empress of Austria. Because of the Concert Hall, the place was renamed to Bedřich Smetana Square in honour of the famous Czech composer Bedřich Smetana, after the proclamation of Czechoslovak Republic in 1918 and later to Mozartplatz in honour of the German composer W. A. Mozart during the time of German occupation. In May 1945, fallen soldiers of the Red Army were provisionally buried on the square, which was named again Bedřich Smetana Square, but was renamed to Square of Red Army Soldiers only few years later.

The current name Jan Palach Square was introduced briefly (and unofficially) in 1969 after a huge funeral crowd honoring the student Jan Palach gathered there. Jan Palach immolated himself in January 1969 in protest against the Soviet occupation of Czechoslovakia. After the Velvet Revolution, on 20 December 1989, the name Jan Palach Square was made permanent.

== Transport ==
Jan Palach Square is accessible by trams Nos. 17 and 18 or by the A Line of Prague Metro. The exit of Staroměstská metro station is located next to the southeast corner of the square, and across the nearby bridge is Malostranská metro station.

== See also ==
- Jan Palach
- 2023 Prague shooting
