= Staroměstská (Prague Metro) =

Prague metro station

Coordinates: 50°5′17.466″N 14°25′3.48″E

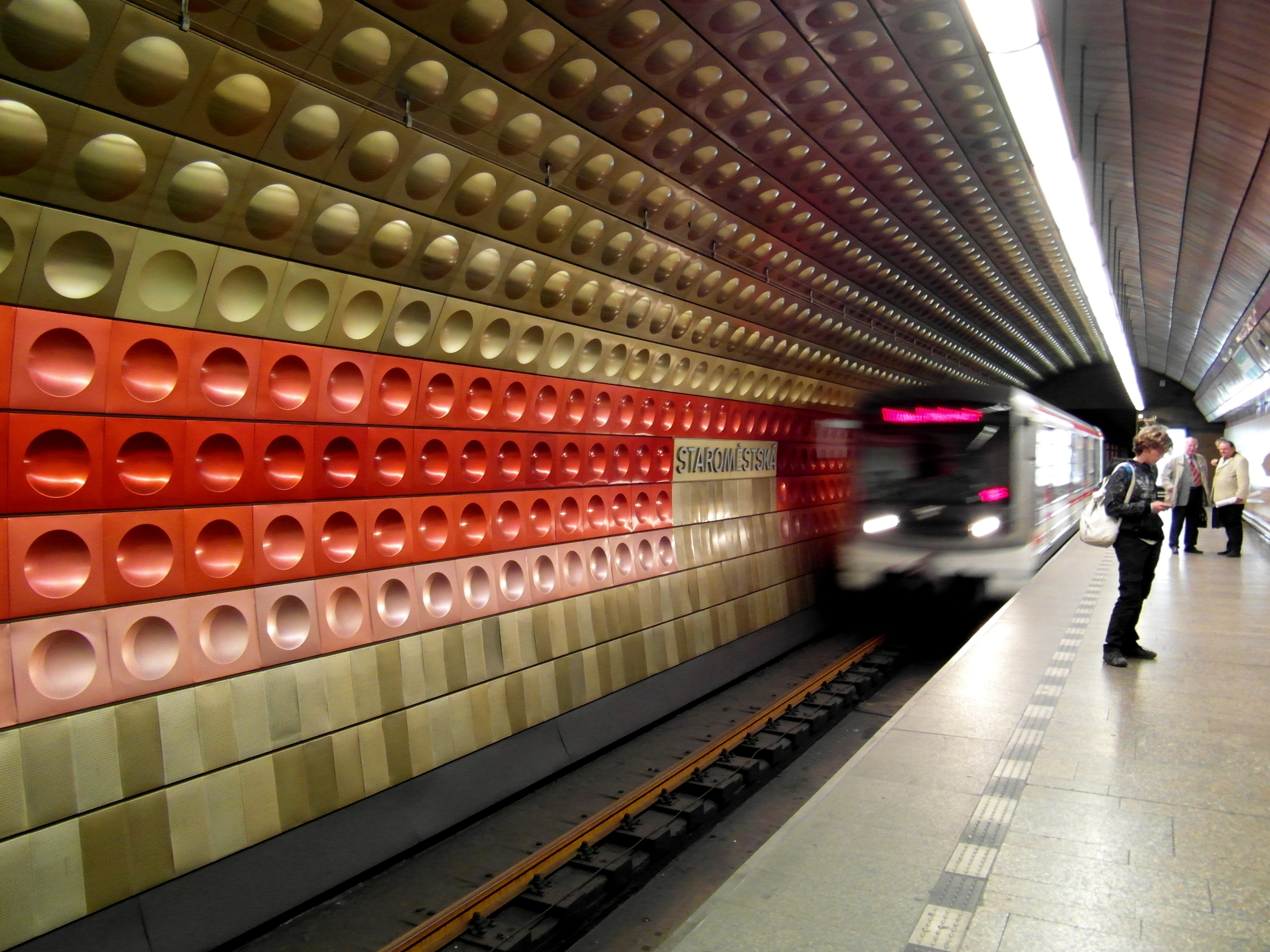

General information
- Location: Kaprova street Staré Město, Prague 1 Prague; Czech Republic
- System: Prague Metro
- Platforms: 1 island platform
- Tracks: 2

Construction
- Structure type: Underground
- Depth: 28 m (92 ft)

History
- Opened: 12 August 1978; 48 years ago

Services
Preceding station	Prague Metro	Following station
Malostranská toward Nemocnice Motol	Line A	Můstek toward Depo Hostivař
Location

Staroměstská (Czech pronunciation: [ˈstaromɲɛst.skaː]) is a Prague Metro station on Line A. It was opened on 12 August 1978 as part of the inaugural section of Line A, between Leninova and Náměstí Míru.

== General information ==
The station is located under Kaprova street in the Old Town (its name means 'Old Town' [station]). There is currently one entrance through an escalator tunnel from the corner of Kaprova and Valentinská streets (with the Old Jewish Cemetery, Municipal Library and Rudolfinum within one or two minutes walk). There were also plans to build a second escalator tunnel with an entrance from the northeast corner of the Old Town Square which would use and show to the public a preserved cellar of a medieval house (like the ruins of a medieval bridge at Můstek station), but this has been postponed indefinitely due to financial constraints.

The architect of this station is Lubomír Hanel. The design is characteristic of the A line, with the ceiling and the walls tiled using anodized aluminum panels, and the pillars tiled with white marble.

== Gallery ==
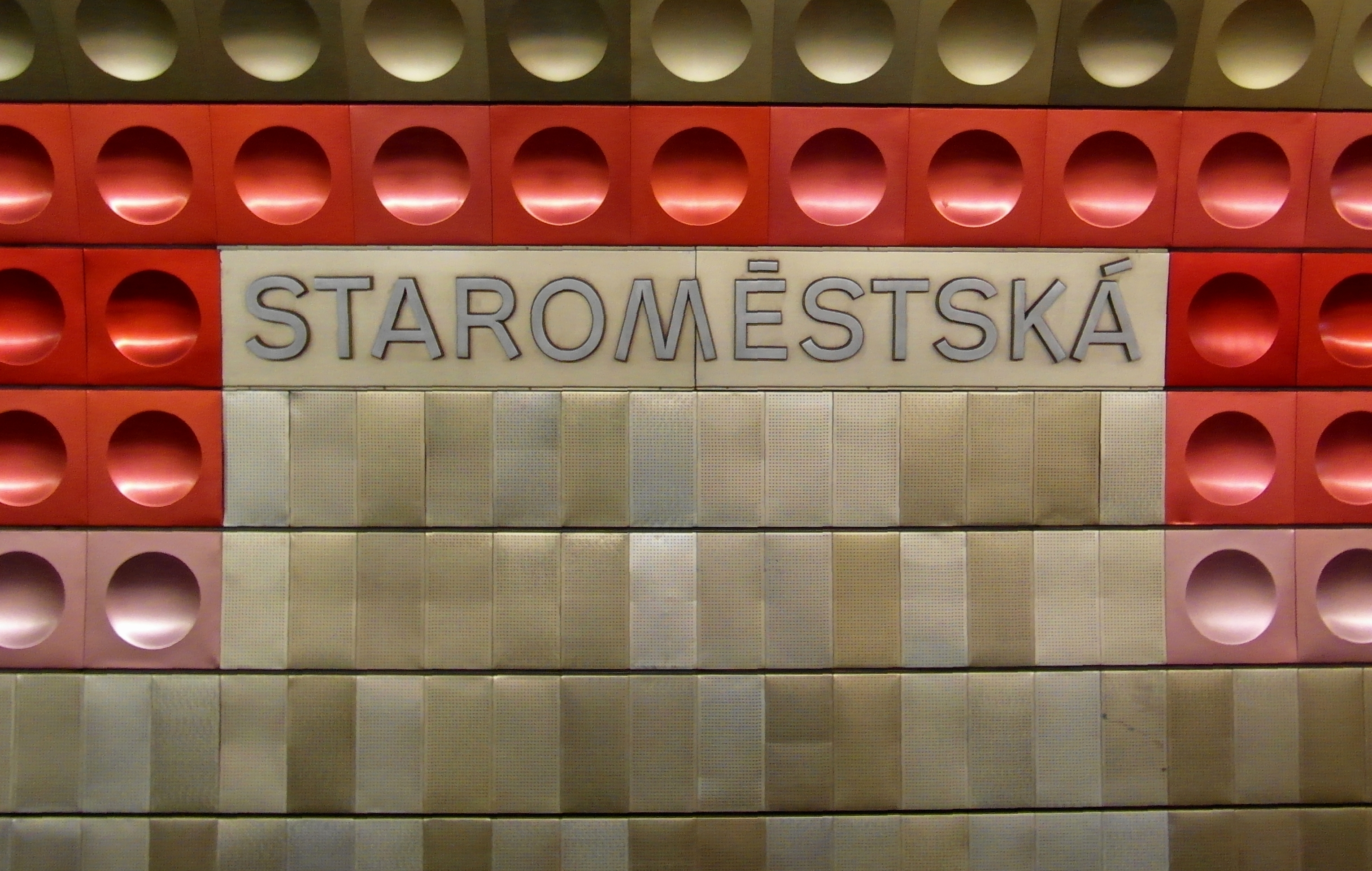

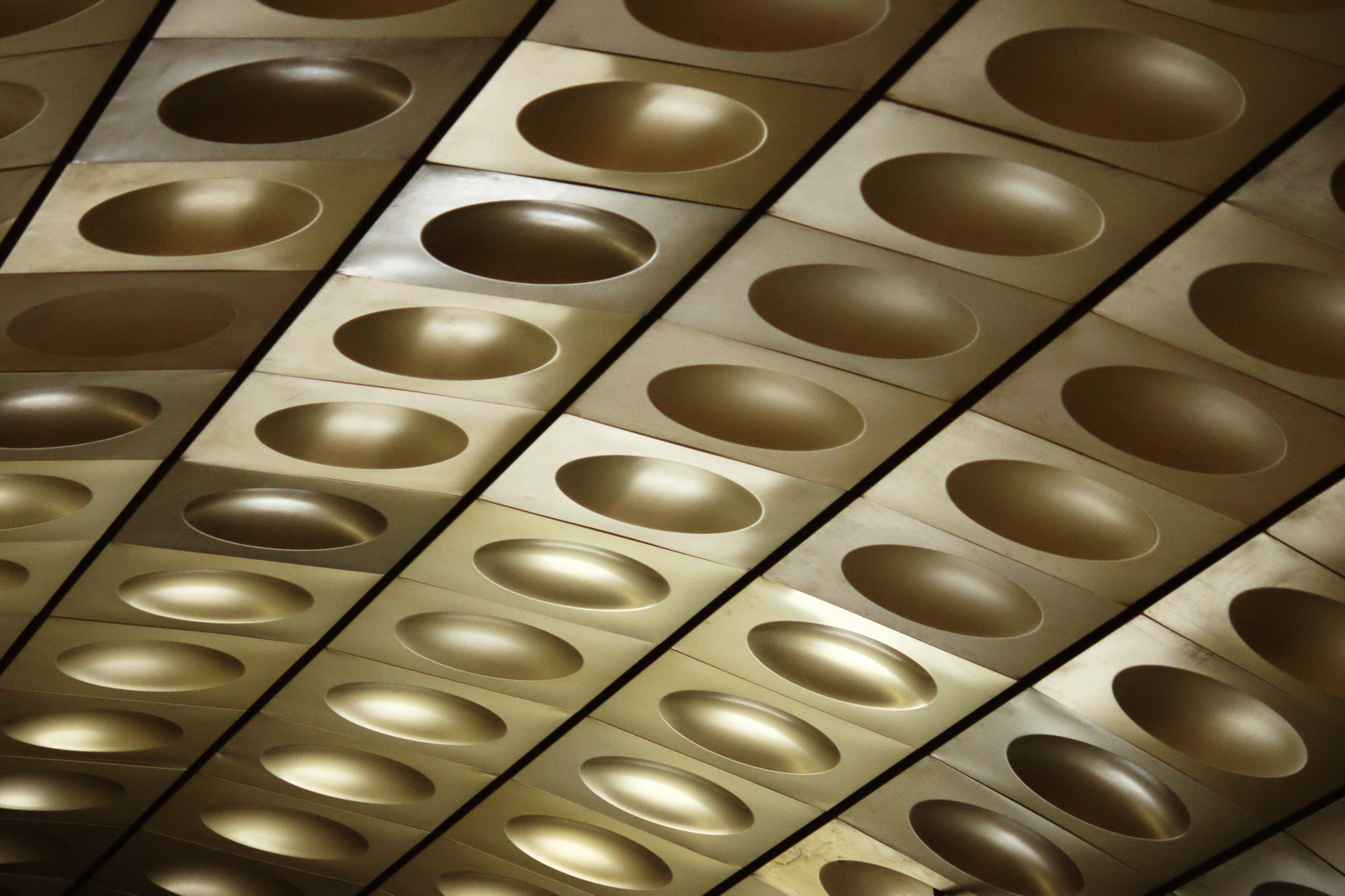

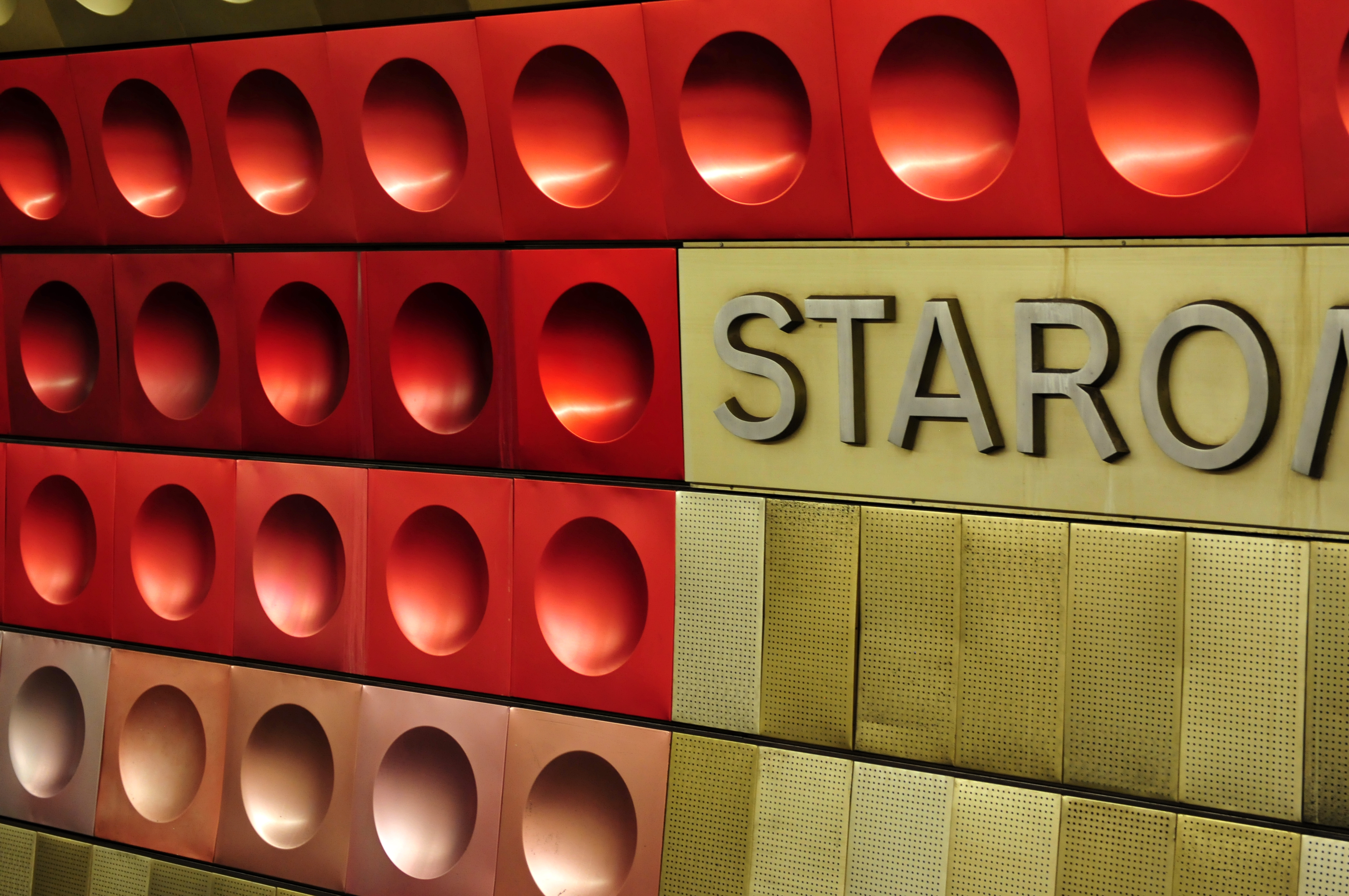
