= Hradčanská (Prague Metro) =

Prague metro station

Coordinates: 50°5′49.97″N 14°24′16.45″E

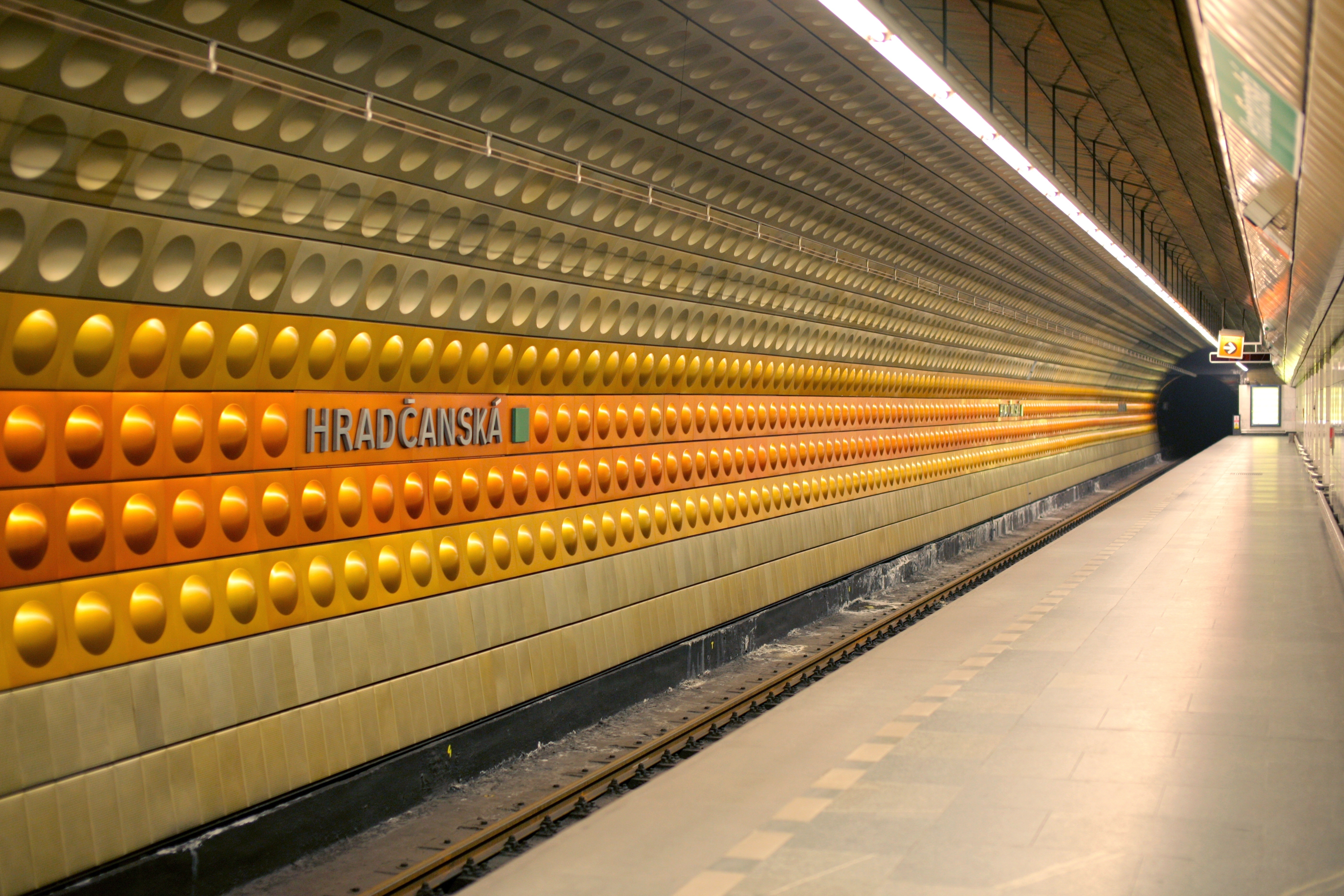

General information
- Location: Milada Horáková street Dejvice, Prague 6 Prague; Czech Republic
- System: Prague Metro
- Platforms: 1 island platform
- Tracks: 2

Construction
- Structure type: Underground
- Depth: 43 m (141 ft)

History
- Opened: 12 August 1978; 48 years ago

Services
Preceding station	Prague Metro	Following station
Dejvická toward Nemocnice Motol	Line A	Malostranská toward Depo Hostivař
Location

Hradčanská (Czech pronunciation: [ˈɦrat.tʃanskaː]) is a Prague Metro station on Line A, between Dejvická and Malostranská stations. It is named after Hradčany, the district where Prague Castle is located (hrad means "castle" in Czech). However, the Castle itself is 10 minutes away walking from the station. This station originally had only one exit toward Milady Horákové street. It now has multiple exits on this street, on each site of the tram tracks. There is now also an exit directly onto Dejvická street.

The station was opened on 12 August 1978 as part of the inaugural section of Line A, between Leninova and Náměstí Míru.

The station vestibule, which extends under the tram stop, and into which the escalator tunnel enters directly in the middle, is lined with yellow stone. It has a Czech lion carved into it and an inscription reading "Veškerá moc v ČSSR patří pracujícímu lidu" ("All power in the CSSR belongs to the working people").
