= Malostranská (Prague Metro) =

Prague metro station

Coordinates: 50°5′28.45″N 14°24′34.17″E

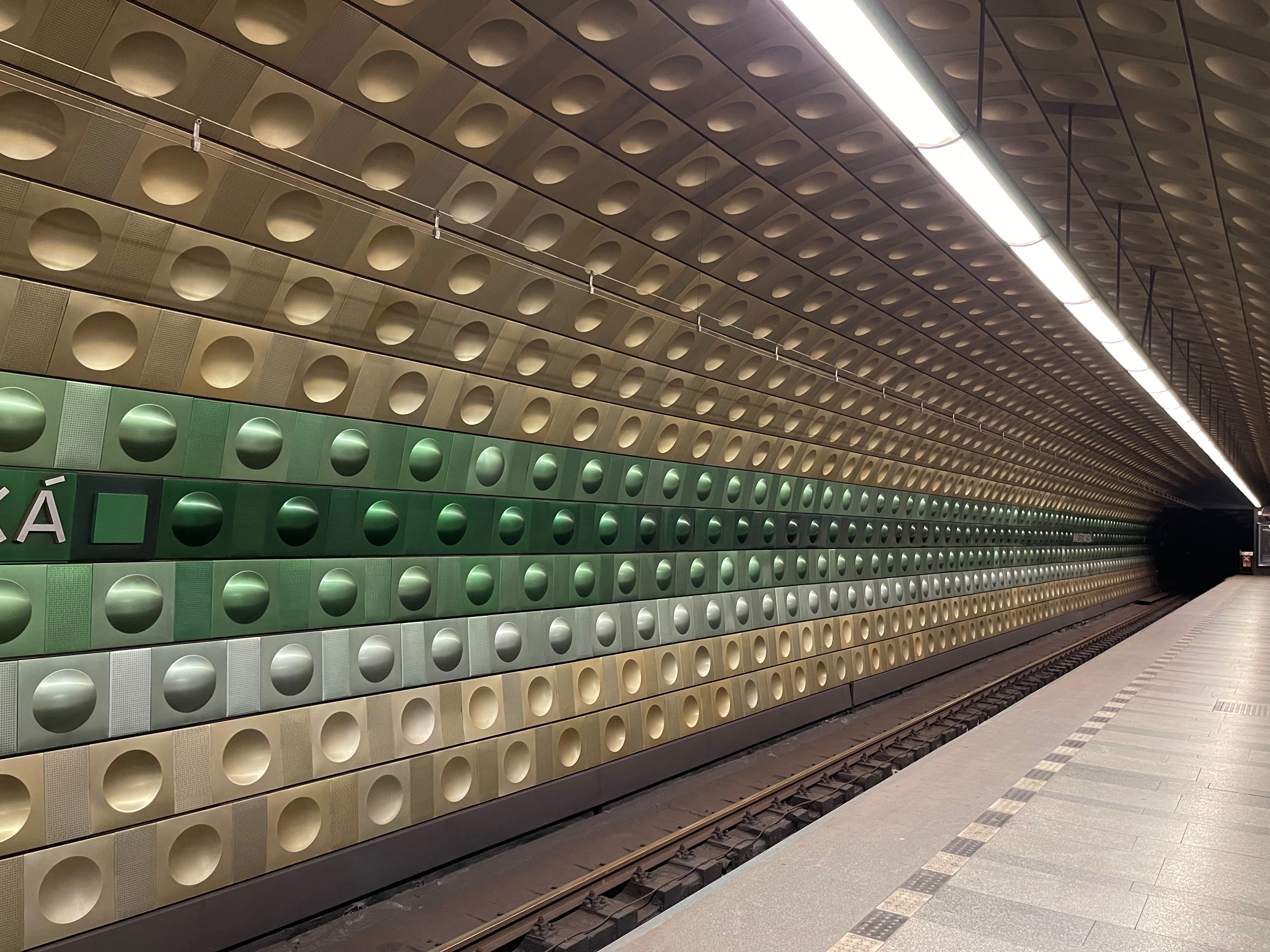

General information
- Location: Klárov street Malá Strana, Prague 1 Prague; Czech Republic
- System: Prague Metro
- Platforms: 1 island platform
- Tracks: 2

Construction
- Structure type: Underground
- Depth: 32 m (105 ft)

History
- Opened: 12 August 1978; 48 years ago

Services
Preceding station	Prague Metro	Following station
Hradčanská toward Nemocnice Motol	Line A	Staroměstská toward Depo Hostivař
Location

Malostranská (Czech pronunciation: [ˈmalostranskaː]) is a Prague Metro station on Line A. The station is 32 meters under Klárov street in Malá Strana, Prague 1, situated next to the gardens of Wallenstein Palace.

== History ==
The station was opened on 12 August 1978 as part of the inaugural section of Line A, between Leninova and Náměstí Míru.

The architect was Zdeněk Drobný, whose design of the station interior was inspired by the historical environment of the Malá Strana. The station is decorated with replicas of baroque sandstone sculptures and artistic wrought-iron bars. In the vestibule, there is a copy of the allegorical statue of Elpis from the Gallery of Statues of Virtues and Vices in Kuks by Matyáš Bernard Braun, and in the entrance hall a copy of the statues of Mercury and Venus from Valeč Chateau, by his nephew Antonín Braun.

The glass entrance hall includes a cafe space enclosed by metal bars with motifs of Malá Strana house signs by Jan Smrž. Adjacent to the station is a small park with a fountain in the courtyard in front of the Wallenstein Palace Riding School, which was designed in collaboration with architect Otakar Kuča.

== Exits ==
This station has an exit to Klárov street, where a major tram transfer point is located. It was impossible to build a second exit underneath, because of the proximity to the Vltava river.

== Gallery ==
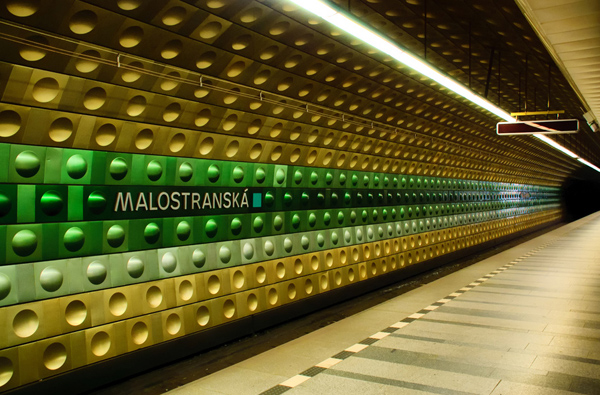
Malostranská metro station platform

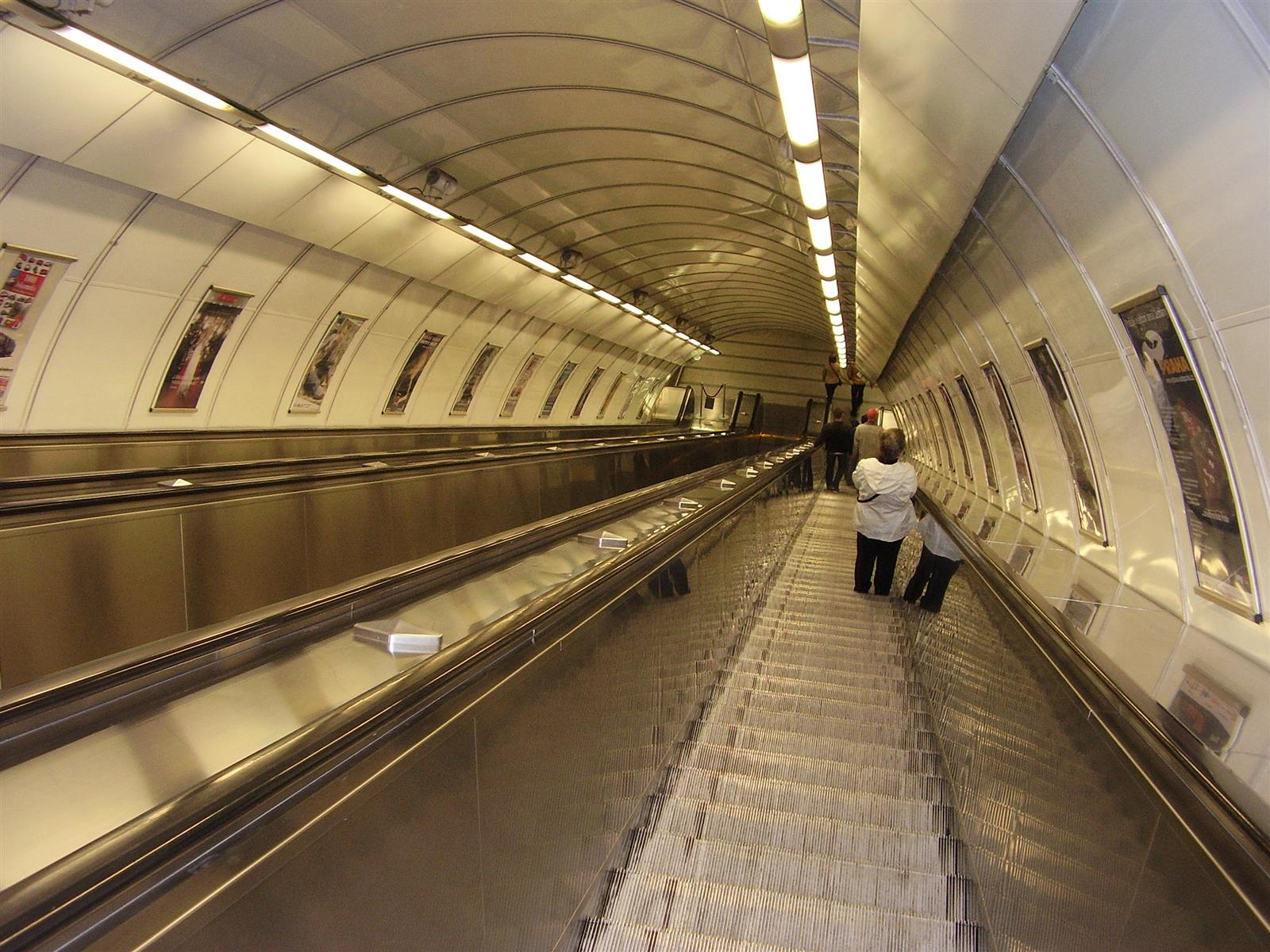
Station escalators
