= Náměstí Míru (Prague Metro) =

Prague metro station

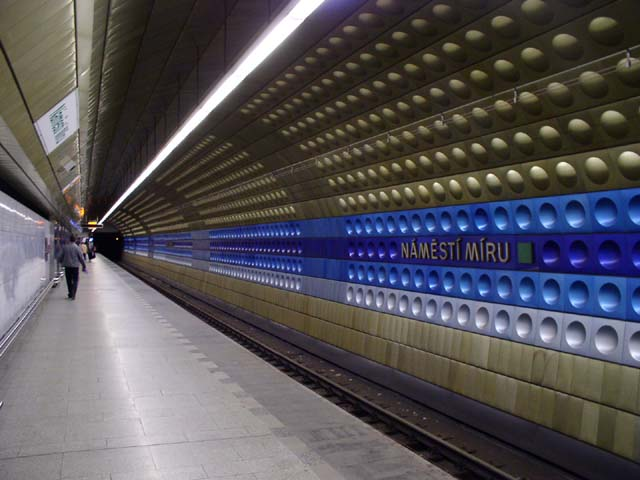
- Westbound platform

General information
- Location: Náměstí Míru; Vinohrady, Prague 2 Prague; Czech Republic
- Coordinates: 50°4′31.197″N 14°26′15.684″E
- System: Prague Metro
- Owner: Dopravní podnik hl. m. Prahy
- Line: A
- Tracks: 2

Construction
- Structure type: Underground
- Depth: 53 metres (174 ft)

History
- Opened: 12 August 1978; 48 years ago

Services
Preceding station	Prague Metro	Following station
Muzeum toward Nemocnice Motol	Line A	Jiřího z Poděbrad toward Depo Hostivař
Location
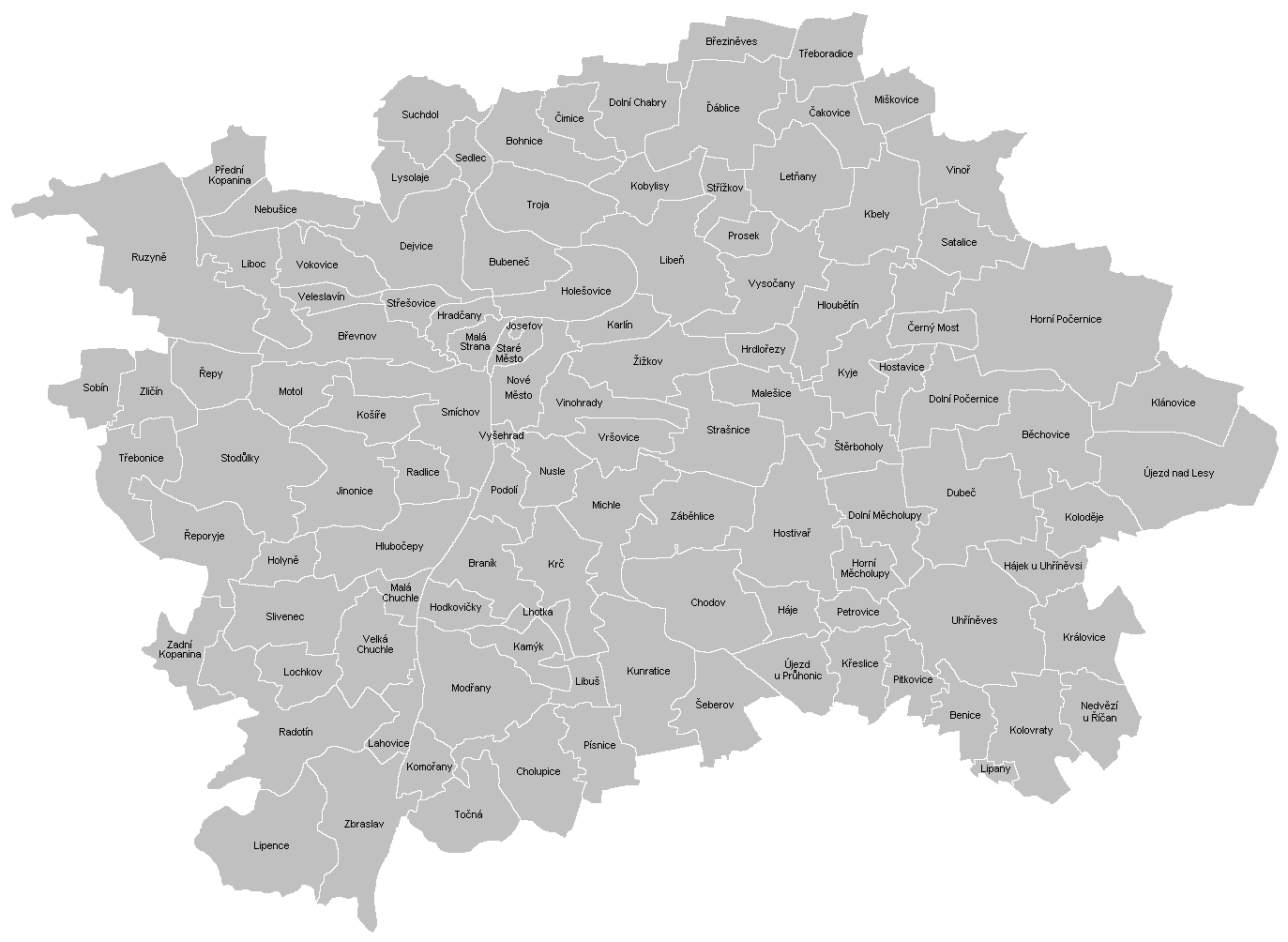
- Location within Prague Location within Greater Prague Location within Czech Republic

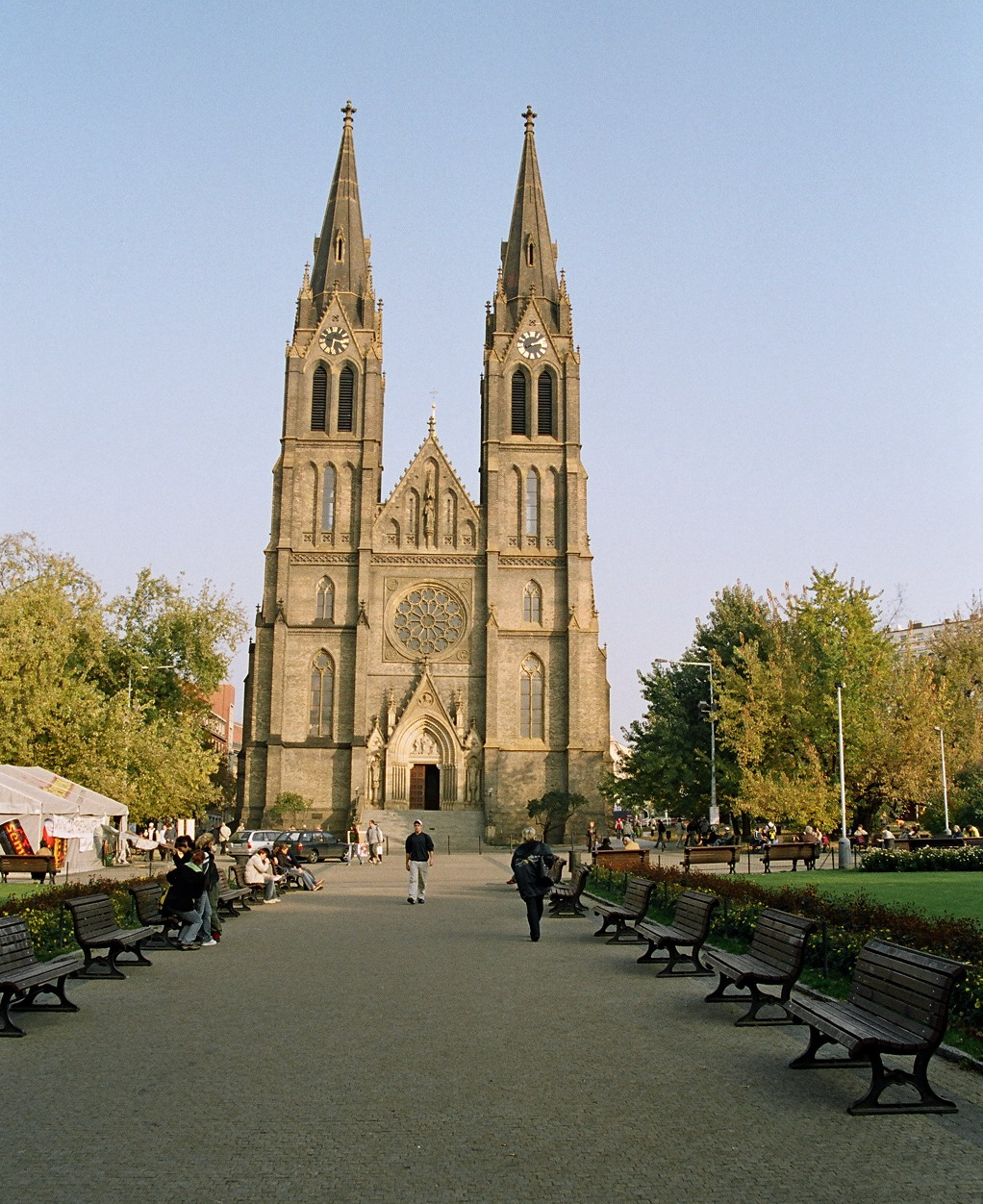
Náměstí Míru, the square above the metro station with Church of St. Ludmila

Náměstí Míru (Czech pronunciation: [ˈnaːmɲɛsciː ˈmiːru], English: Peace Square) is a Prague Metro station on Line A. It is located in Vinohrady district under Korunní Street and has one exit through an escalator tunnel with a sub-surface vestibule under the plaza of the same name. The exit of the metro station is in the immediate vicinity of the Church of St. Ludmila and Vinohrady Theatre. The station was completed along with the first section of Line A, between Leninova and Náměstí Míru, and opened on 12 August 1978. It served as a terminus until the extension of Line A to Želivského station on 19 December 1980.

Náměstí Míru is the deepest station of the Prague Metro, its platform is situated 53 metres below surface. The station has the longest escalators in European Union (length 87 m, vertical span 43.5 m, 533 steps, taking 2 minutes and 21 seconds to ascend or 2 minutes 19 seconds to descend without walking). Náměstí Míru, however, is not the deepest point within the Prague Metro network; this record belongs to the tunnel between Hradčanská and Malostranská stations (68 m below surface).

The station is named after the square under which it is located. During the 2002 European floods the station became the western terminus for its line, with trains running to Skalka.

Náměstí Míru is intended to be part of the new Line D, with trains running between the station and C-line station Pankrác. The D-line station is intended to be built closer to the surface, meaning the existing station on the A-line will continue to be the deepest on the network.
