= Skalka (Prague Metro) =

Prague metro station

Coordinates: 50°04′05″N 14°30′27″E

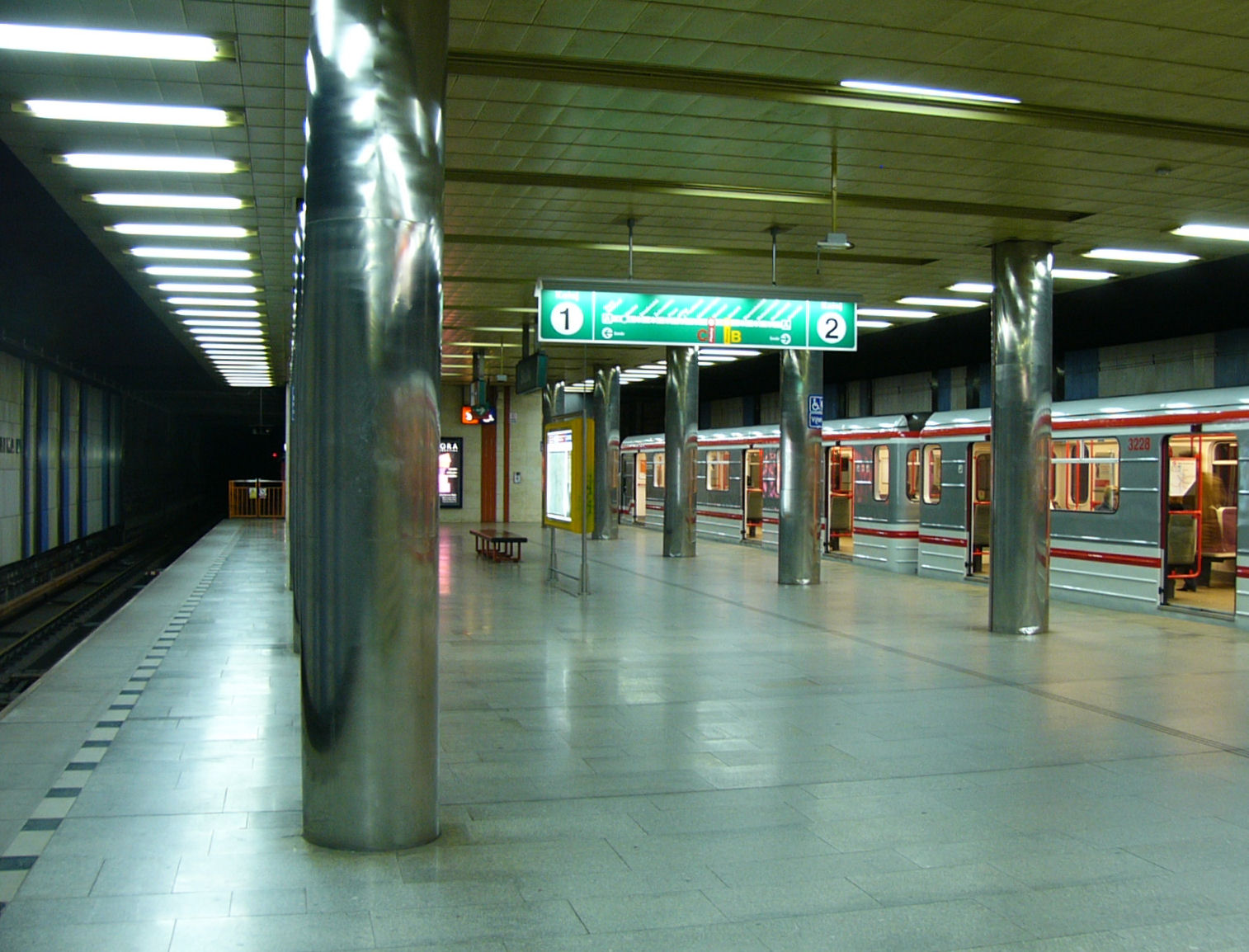

General information
- Location: Na Padesátém street, Strašnice; Prague 10; Prague; Czech Republic
- System: Prague Metro
- Platforms: 1 island platform
- Tracks: 2

Construction
- Structure type: Underground
- Depth: 925 m (3,035 ft)
- Accessible: Yes

History
- Opened: 4 July 1990; 36 years ago

Services
Preceding station	Prague Metro	Following station
Strašnická toward Nemocnice Motol	Line A	Depo Hostivař Terminus
Location

Skalka (Czech pronunciation: [ˈskalka]) is a Prague Metro station of Line A, located in Strašnice, Prague 10. It was opened on 4 July 1990 as the southern terminus of the extension of the line from Strašnická. On 27 May 2006 the line was extended to Depo Hostivař.

The station appears in the music video of One Armed Scissor a song by the band At The Drive In.

== Gallery ==
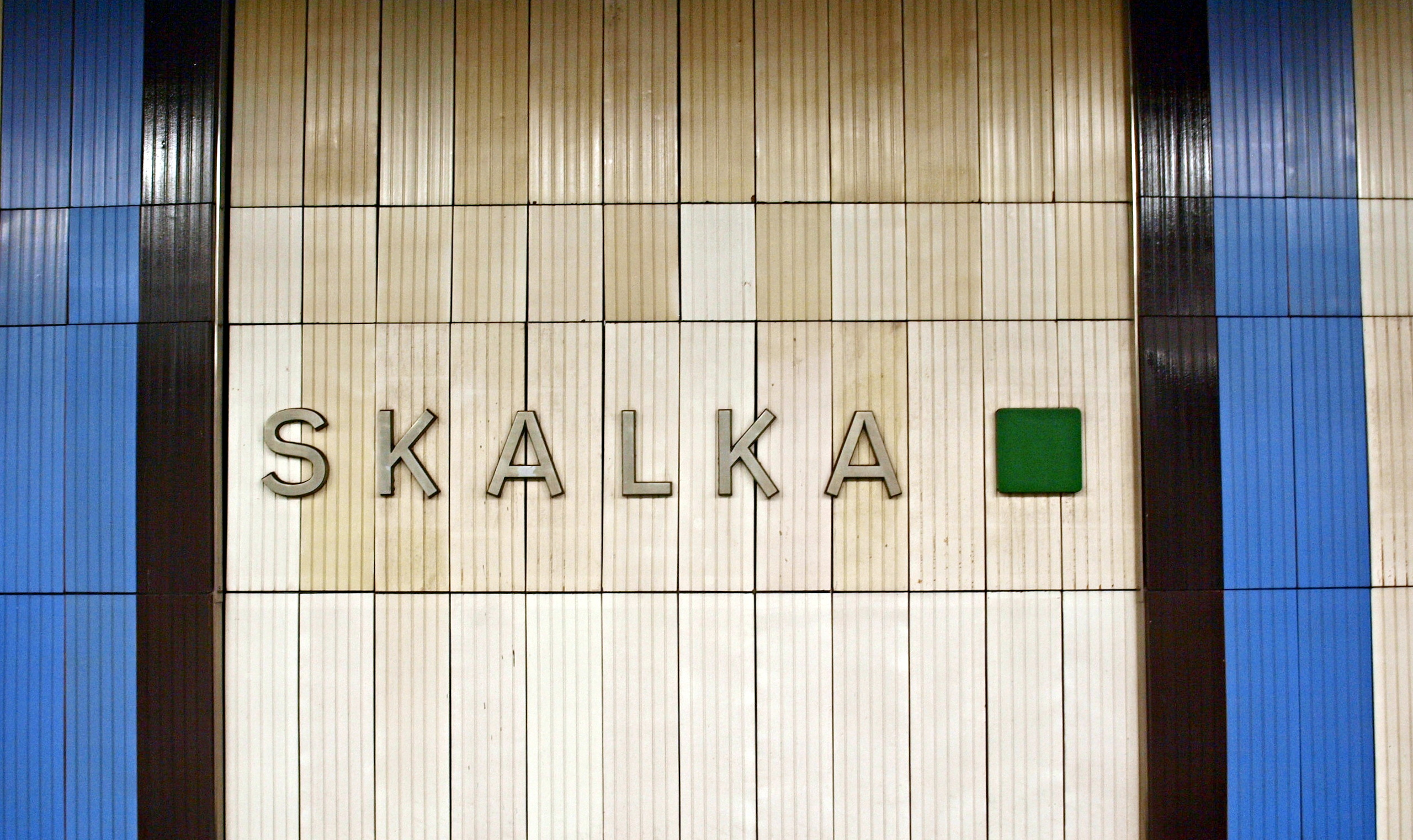
Station name

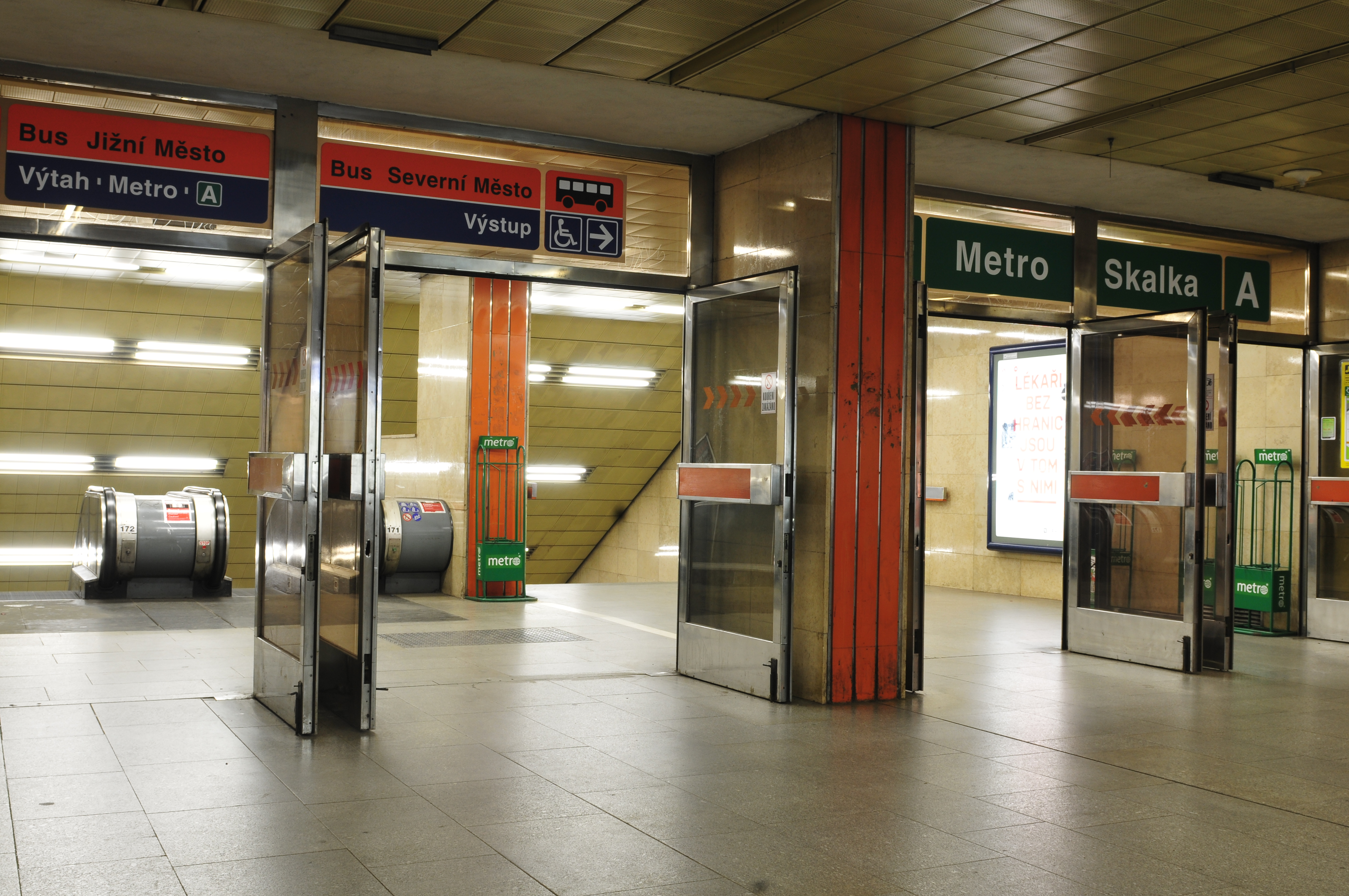
Station lobby
