= Rudolfinum =

Historical building in Prague, Czech Republic

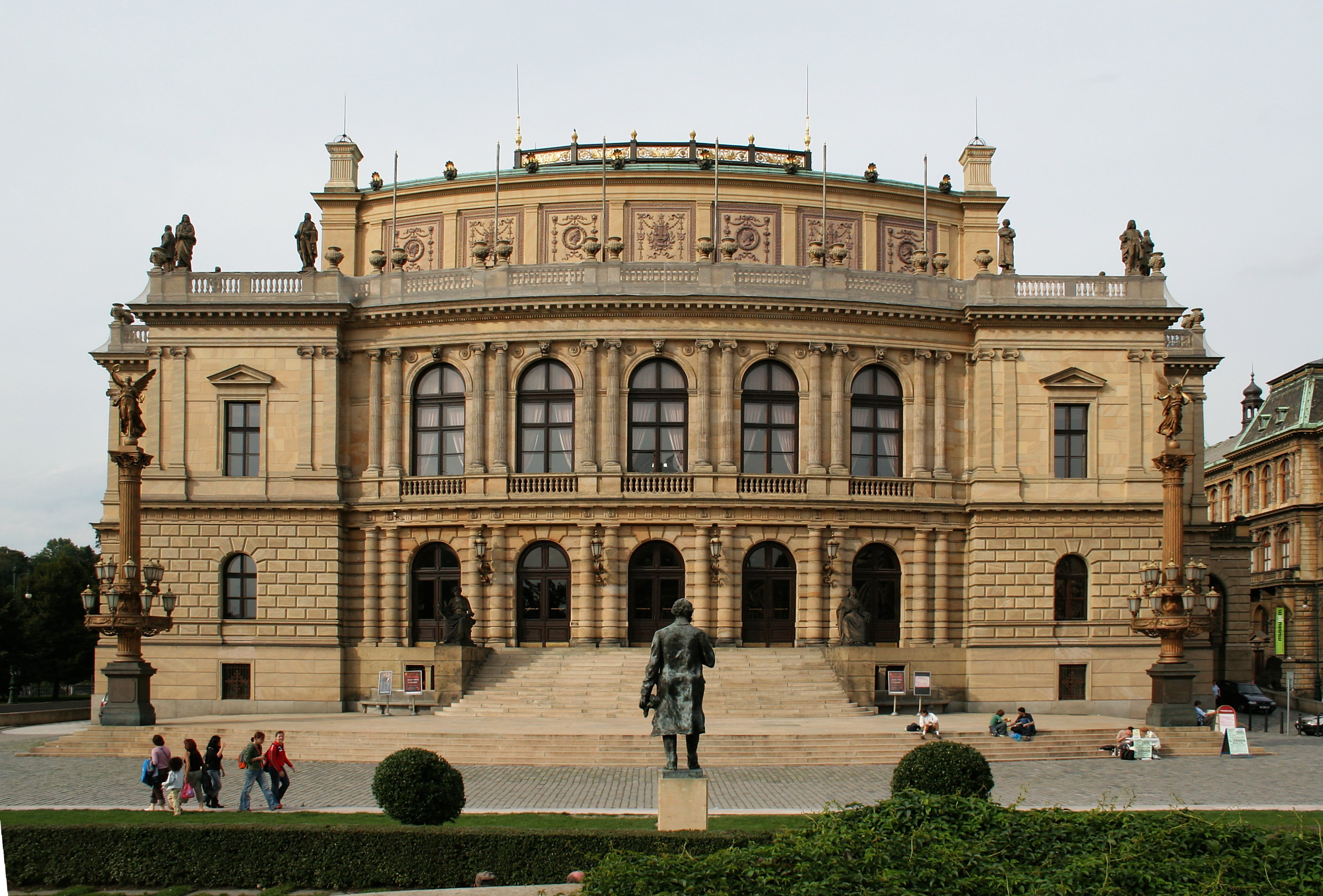
- Front façade of the Rudolfinum

- Location within Prague
- Address: Alšovo nábřeží 12; Prague; Czech Republic
- Coordinates: 50.090°N 14.416°E
- Type: Music hall; art gallery

Construction
- Opened: 8 February 1885
- Architects: Josef Zítek; Josef Schulz

Website
- rudolfinum.cz/en

The Rudolfinum is a building in Prague, Czech Republic. It is designed in the neo-Renaissance style and is situated on Jan Palach Square on the bank of the river Vltava. Since its opening in 1885, it has been associated with music and art.

Currently, the Czech Philharmonic Orchestra and Galerie Rudolfinum are based in the building. Its largest music auditorium, Dvořák Hall, is one of the main venues of the Prague Spring International Music Festival and is noted for its excellent acoustics.

== Uses ==
The Rudolfinum has been the home of the Czech Philharmonic Orchestra since 1946 and is one of the main venues of the Prague Spring International Music Festival held each year in May and June. The building was designed by architect Josef Zítek and his student Josef Schulz, and was opened on 8 February 1885. It is named in honour of Rudolf, Crown Prince of Austria, who presided over the opening. Between 1919 and 1939, the building was used as the seat of the Czechoslovak parliament.

The Rudolfinum's Dvořák Hall is one of the oldest concert halls in Europe. On 4 January 1896, Antonín Dvořák himself conducted the Czech Philharmonic in the hall in its first ever concert.

During the First Czechoslovak Republic, the building served as the seat of the Chamber of Deputies.

The venue was the location of the recording of Nicola Benedetti's 2010 album Tchaikovsky & Bruch: Violin Concertos.

=== Galerie Rudolfinum ===
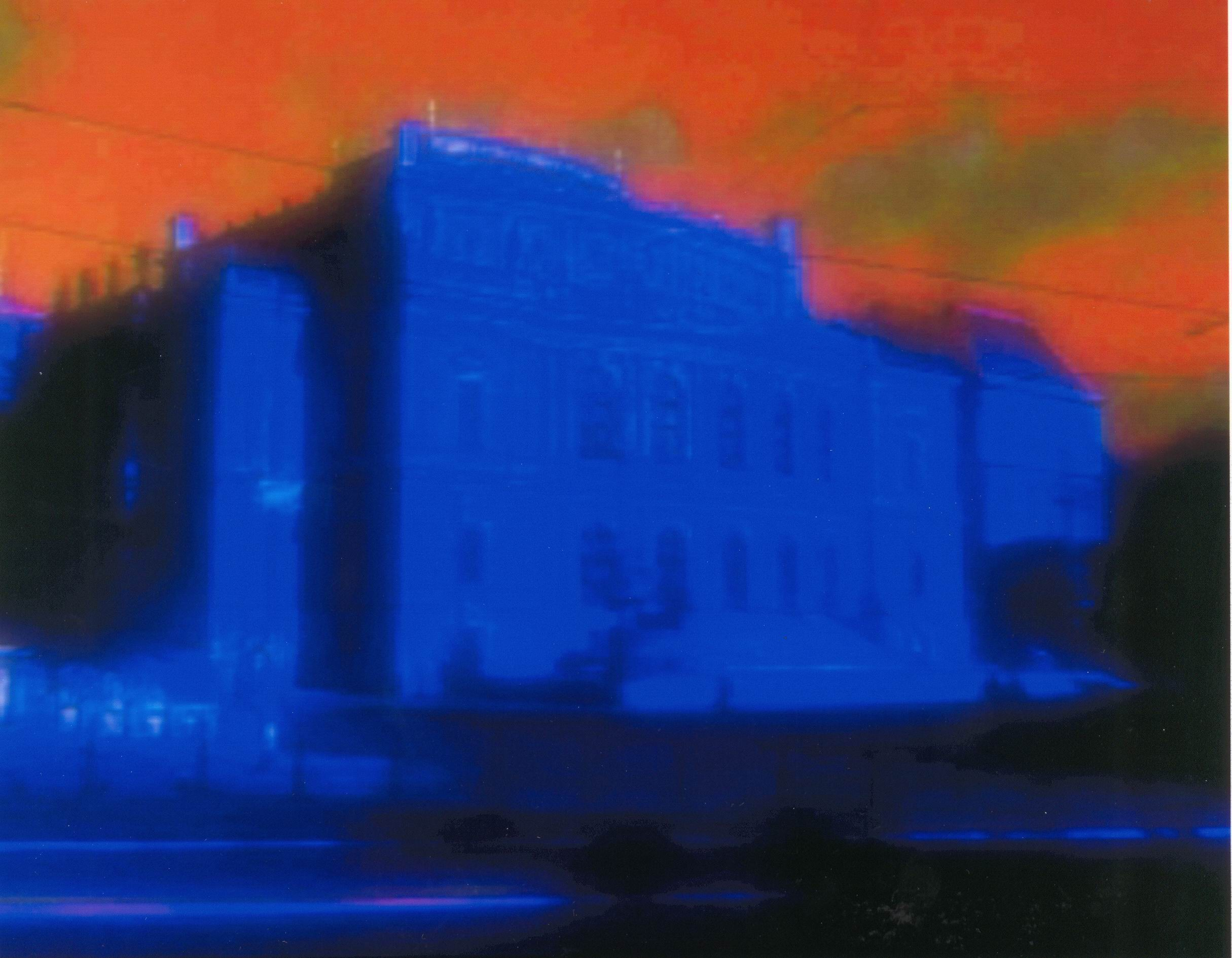
Annelies Štrba – Rudolfinum

The building also contains the Galerie Rudolfinum, an art gallery that focuses mainly on contemporary art. It opened on 1 January 1994 and is a non-profit institution directed and financed by the Czech Ministry of Culture. It is located at the back of the Rudolfinum. Galerie Rudolfinum has no collection of its own, and runs on the Kunsthalle principle, hosting a series of temporary exhibitions. It has around 1,500 square metres of exhibition space.

Major exhibitions have included: Cathy de Monchaux (1997); František Drtikol – Photographer, Painter, Mystic (1998); Cindy Sherman: Retrospective (1998); Jürgen Klauke: Side Effect (1998); Czech Photography 1840–1950, (2004); Annelies Štrba (2005); Neo Rauch: Neue Rollen (2007); Uncertain States of America (2007–2008); Gottfried Helnwein: Angels Sleeping (2008); Andy Warhol: Motion Pictures (2009); Shirana Shahbazi: Then Again (2012); Jake and Dinos Chapman: The Blind Leading the Blind (2013); Ana Mendieta: Traces (2014); Mat Collishaw: Standing Water (2018); Arthur Jafa: A Series of Utterly Improbable, Yet Extraordinary Renditions (2019); David Claerbout: Olympia (2020).

== Gallery ==
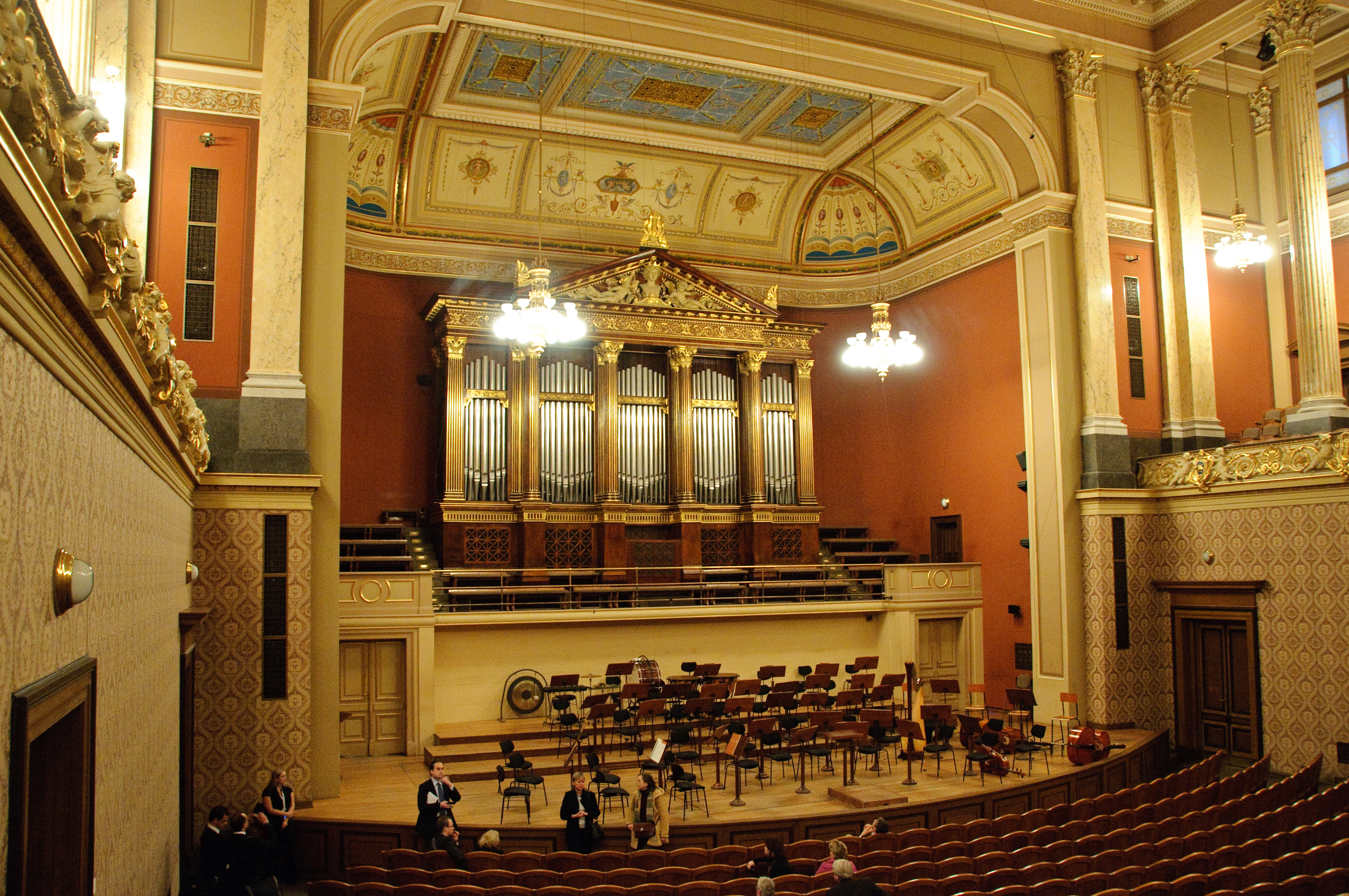
Dvořák Hall

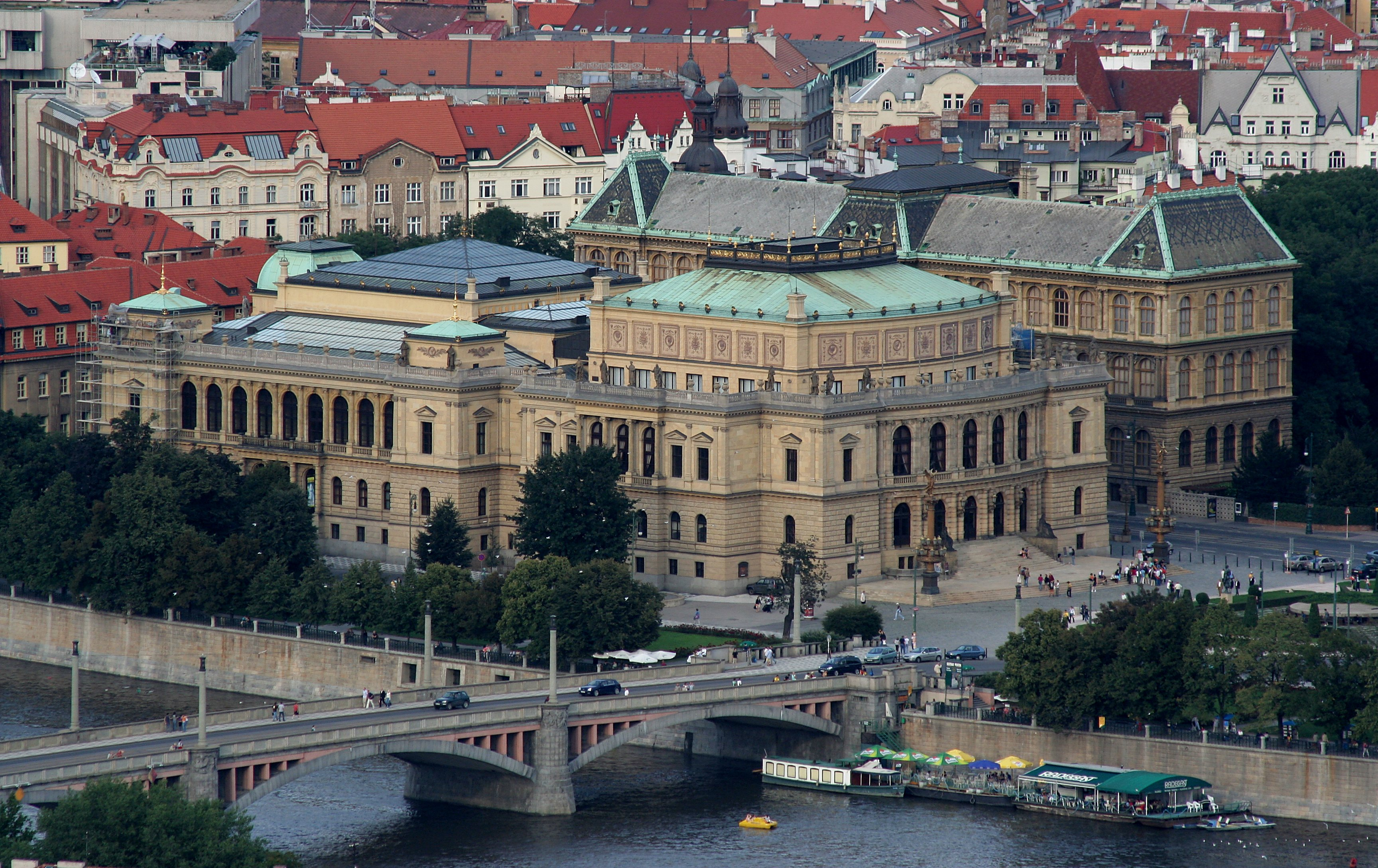
Rudolfinum as seen from Letná

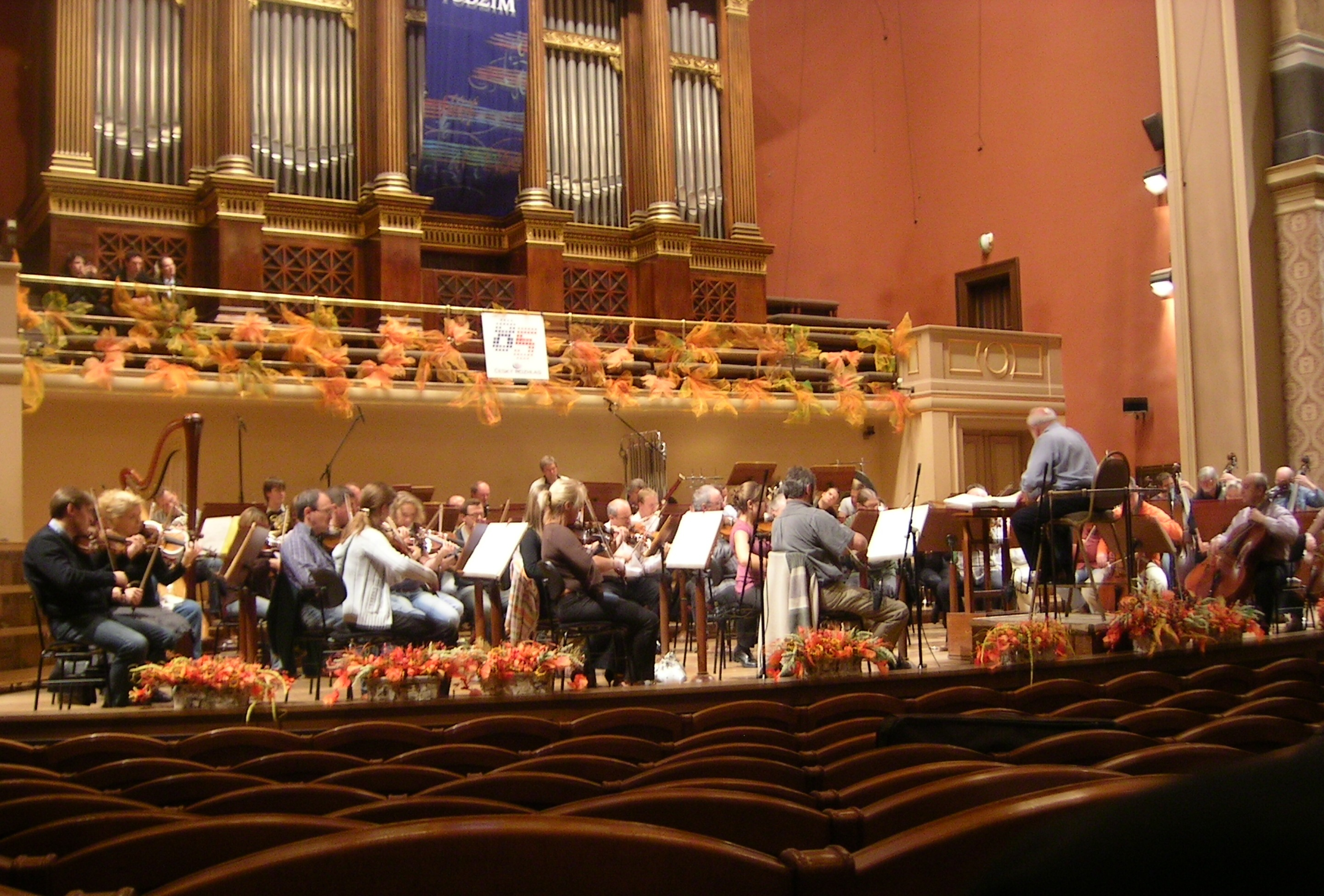
Krzysztof Penderecki and the Sinfonia Varsovia, rehearsal. Prague Autumn International Music Festival 2008.

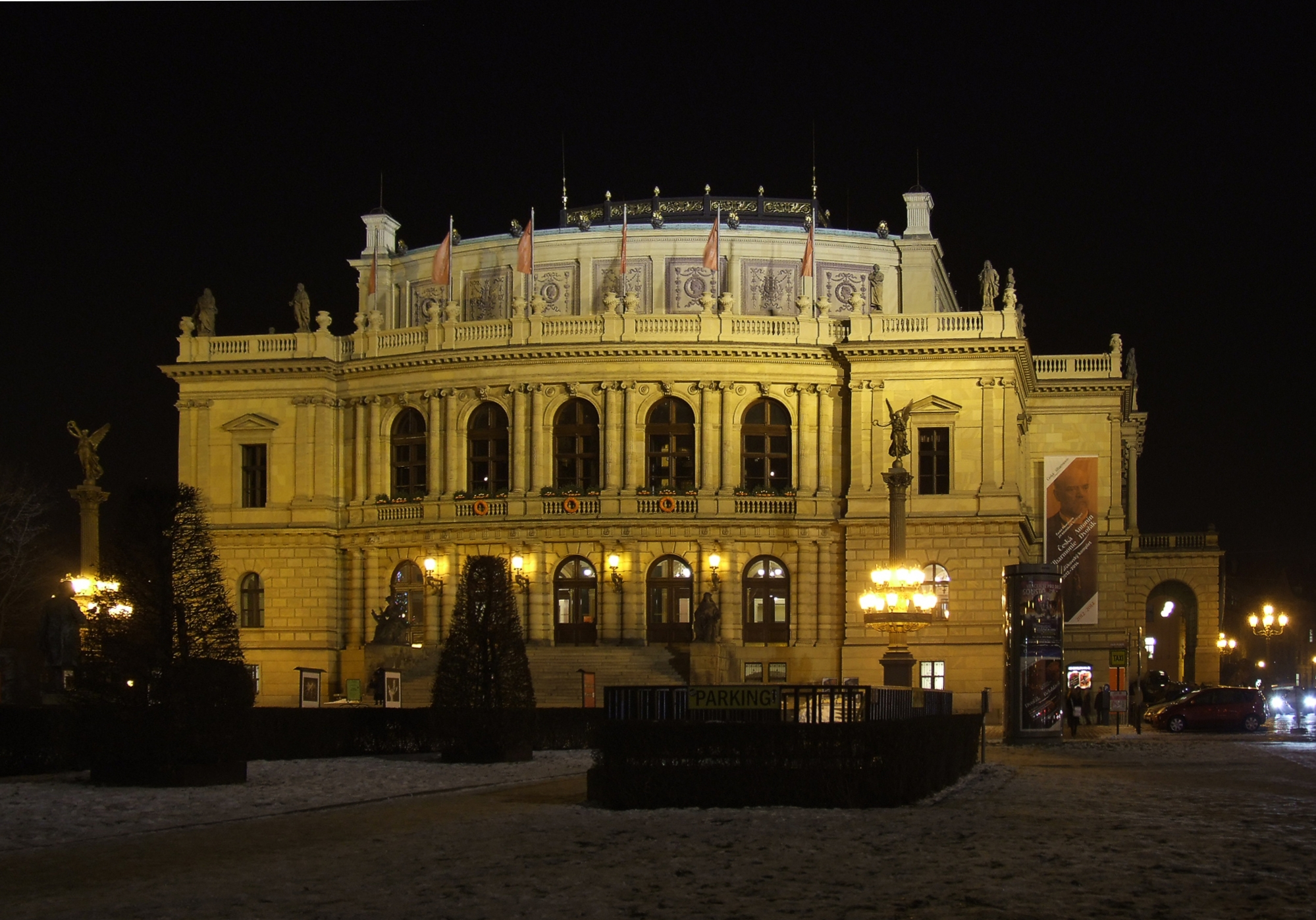
Rudolfinum by night

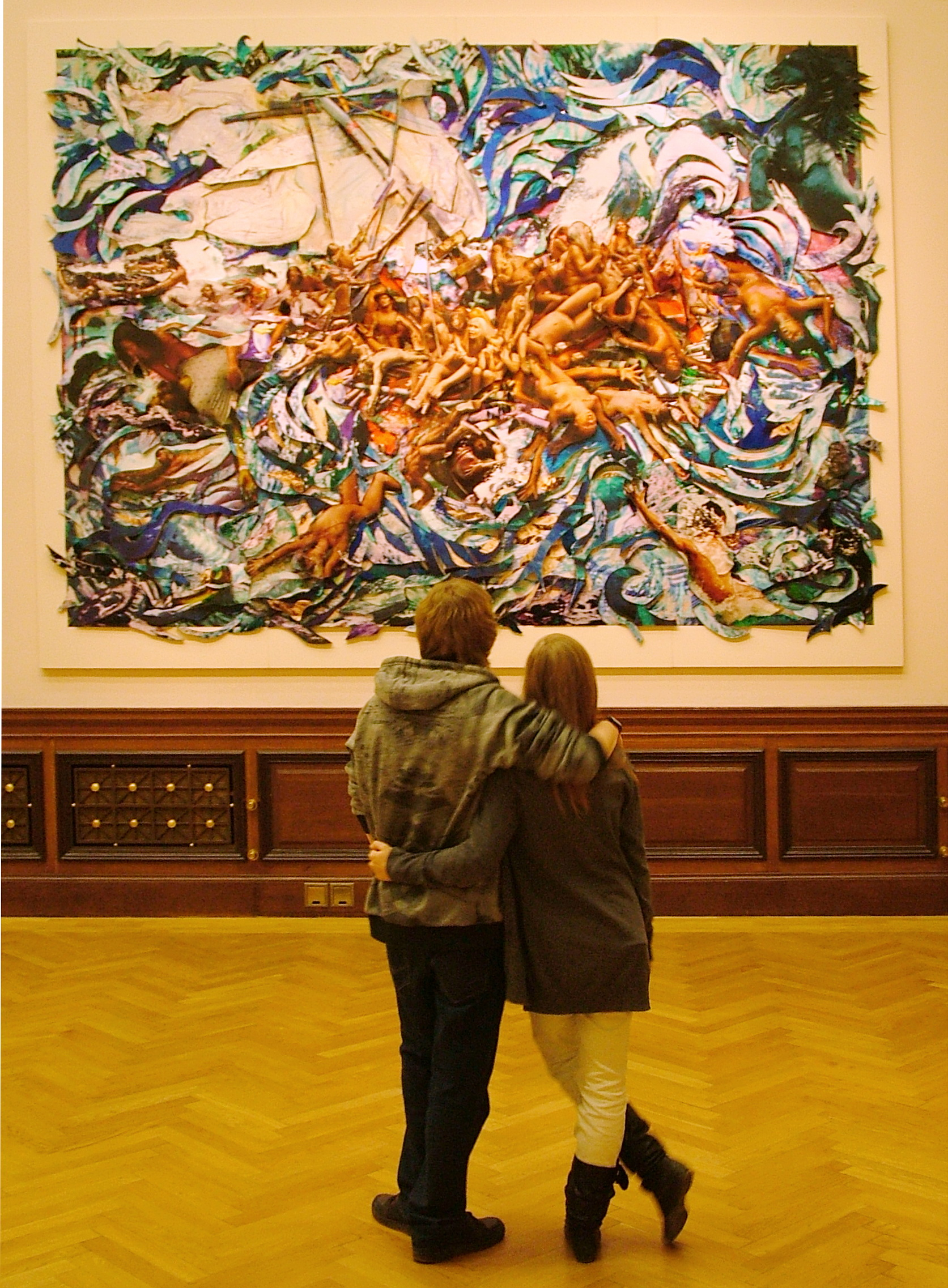
From David LaChapelle's exhibition at Galerie Rudolfinum, 2011

The Rudolfinum during construction, 1876–1884
