= Line A (Prague Metro) =

Metro line in Prague, Czech Republic

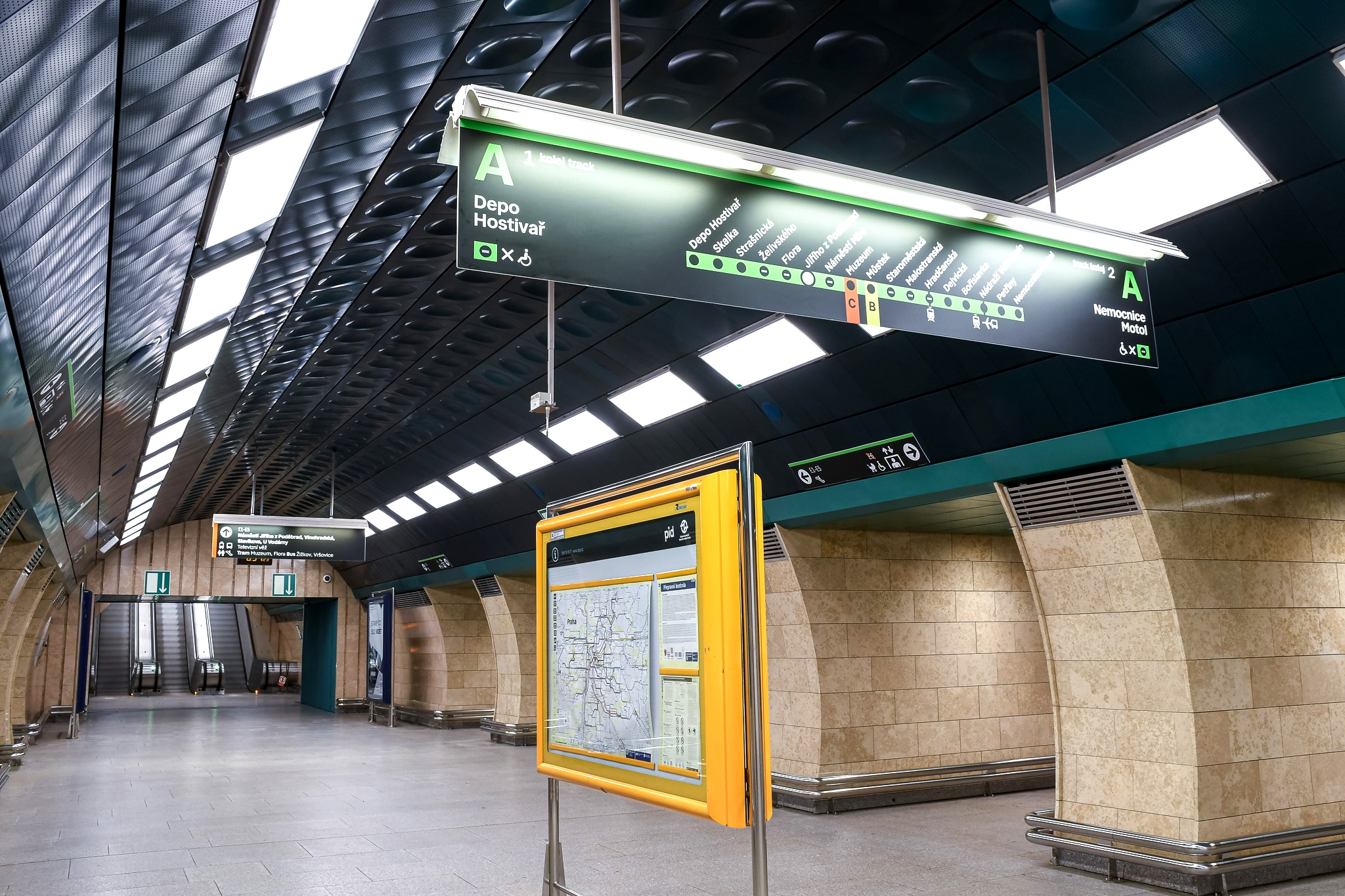
- Jiřího z Poděbrad station

Overview
- Owner: Prague Public Transit Company
- Locale: Prague, Czech Republic
- Stations: 17

Service
- Type: Rapid transit
- System: Prague Metro

History
- Opened: 12 August 1978; 48 years ago
- Last extension: 2015

Technical
- Line length: 17.1 km (10.6 mi)
- Number of tracks: Double
- Character: Underground and Overground
- Track gauge: 1,435 mm (4 ft 8 1/2 in) standard gauge

Line A (Czech: Linka A) is a line of the Prague Metro, serving the Czech capital. Line A operates on approximately 17.1 kilometres (10.6 mi) of route and serves 17 stations in approximately 30-32 minutes.

== History ==
Construction of the first section of the line began in 1973 and was completed on 12 August 1978.

On 6 April 2015, service began on the section known as V.A., which extended the line from Dejvická to Motol via the stations Bořislavka, Nádraží Veleslavín, Petřiny, and Nemocnice Motol. The new section cost approximately 20 billion crowns.

=== Service disruptions ===
Floods of 2002 flooded parts of the line; Staroměstská, Malostranská, Můstek and Muzeum stations were flooded by the Vltava with the total length of the flooded section exceeding three kilometers.

From 14 January to 2 November 2023, the Jiřího z Poděbrad station was closed due to station renovations and the construction of elevator shafts. During the closure, subway trains only passed through the station.

=== Future ===
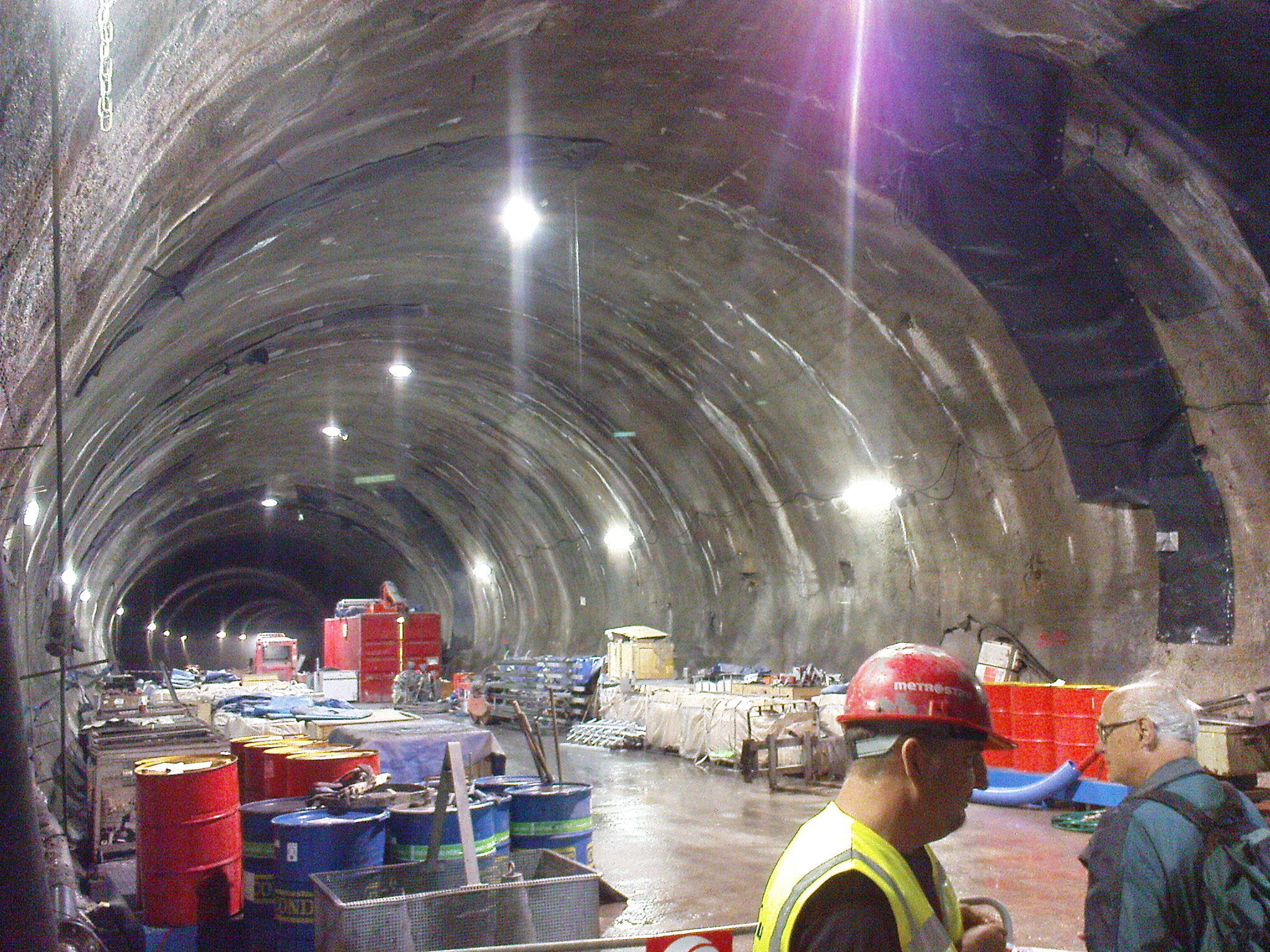
Tunnel between Petřiny and Motol stations under construction, 2011

An extension was expected to extend the line to Václav Havel Airport Prague. In 2015, it was announced that rail was the preferred option of connecting the city with the airport.

== Stations ==
Photo	Name	Abbreviation	Opening date	Transfers
	Nemocnice Motol	MO	6 April 2015	buses
	Petřiny	PE	6 April 2015	trams, buses
	Nádraží Veleslavín	NV	6 April 2015	suburban train, trams, buses
	Bořislavka	BO	6 April 2015	trams, buses
	Dejvická (Leninova until 22 February 1990)	DE	12 August 1978	trams, buses
	Hradčanská	HR	12 August 1978	trams, buses, suburban train
	Malostranská	MA	12 August 1978	trams, buses
	Staroměstská	ST	12 August 1978	trams, buses
	Můstek	MS-A	12 August 1978	line B, trams
	Muzeum	MU-A	12 August 1978	line C, trams, buses
	Náměstí Míru	NM	12 August 1978	trams, buses
	Jiřího z Poděbrad	JP	19 December 1980	trams
	Flora	FL	19 December 1980	trams, buses
	Želivského	ZE	19 December 1980	trams, buses
	Strašnická	SR	11 July 1987	trams, buses
	Skalka	SK	4 July 1990	buses, P+R
	Depo Hostivař	HO	26 May 2006	trams, buses, P+R
