= Depo Hostivař (Prague Metro) =

Prague metro station

Coordinates: 50°04′33″N 14°30′56″E

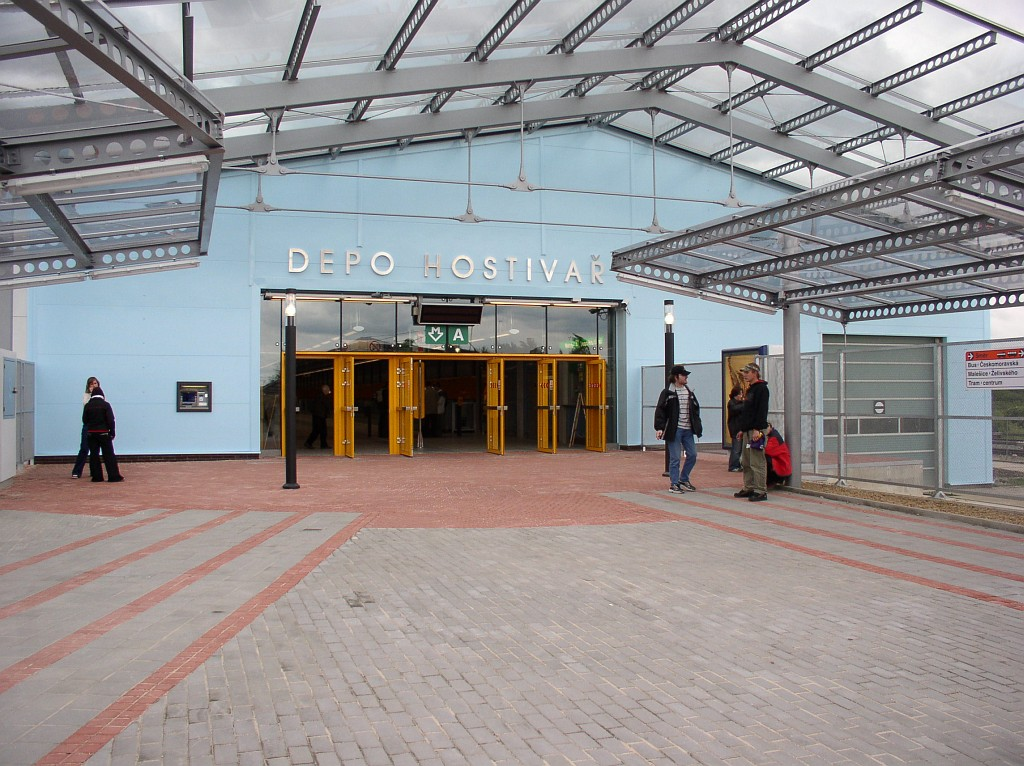
- Station entrance

General information
- Location: Strašnice; Prague 10; Prague; Czech Republic
- System: Prague Metro
- Platforms: 1 island platform
- Tracks: 2

Construction
- Structure type: At grade
- Depth: 0 m (0 ft)
- Accessible: Yes

History
- Opened: 27 May 2006; 20 years ago

Services
Preceding station	Prague Metro	Following station
Skalka toward Nemocnice Motol	Line A	Terminus
Location

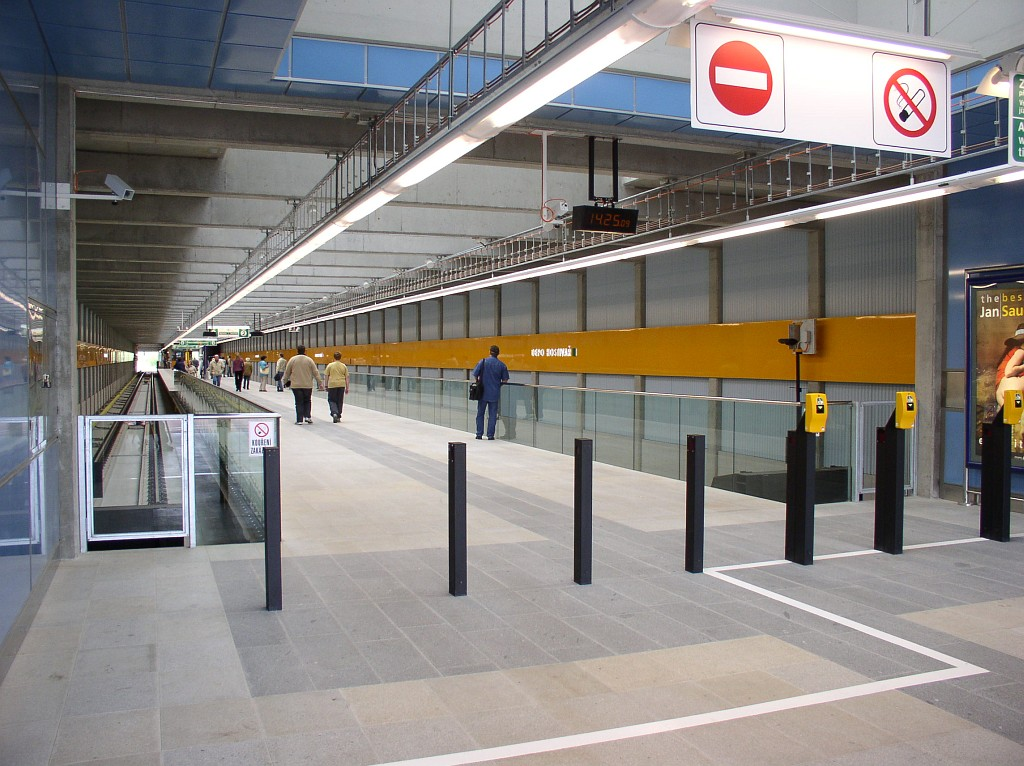
Hallway and Platform - Depo Hostivař

Depo Hostivař (Czech pronunciation: [ˈdɛpo ˈɦoscɪvar̝̊]) is a Prague Metro station and terminus of Line A. It is located on Černokostelecká street, which forms the border between Strašnice and Malešice in Prague 10. The station was constructed in the building of an existing metro depot and was opened on 27 May 2006 as the eastern terminus of the extension from Skalka.
