= Nemocnice Motol (Prague Metro) =

Prague metro station

Coordinates: 50.0753°N 14.3410°E

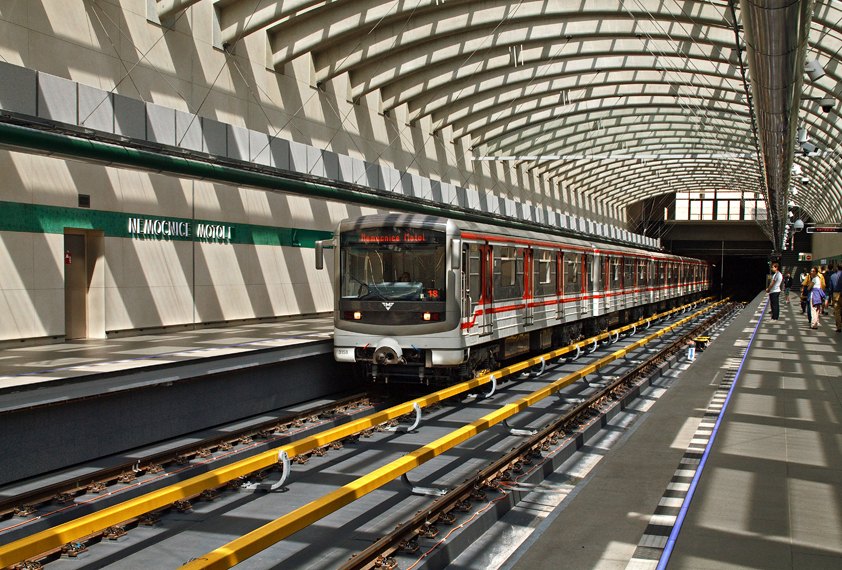

General information
- Location: Kukulova street Motol, Prague 5 Prague; Czech Republic
- System: Prague Metro
- Platforms: 2 side platforms
- Tracks: 2

Construction
- Structure type: Surface level
- Depth: 56 m (184 ft)
- Accessible: Yes

History
- Opened: 6 April 2015; 11 years ago

Services
Preceding station	Prague Metro	Following station
Terminus	Line A	Petřiny toward Depo Hostivař
Location

Nemocnice Motol (Czech pronunciation: [ˈnɛmot͡sɲɪt͡sɛ ˈmotol], English: Motol Hospital) is a Prague Metro station on Line A. The station was opened on 6 April 2015 as part of the extension from Dejvická and is the western terminus of this line. The station is located in Prague 5 and is named after the nearby Motol University Hospital.

== General information ==
The station's original planned name was simply Motol after the area of the same name. Nevertheless, the name was finally changed to better reflect the actual location of the station next to the Motol Hospital, the largest medical facility in the Czech Republic.

The station was built as a surface station and was designed by the architect Pavel Sýs.

== Gallery ==
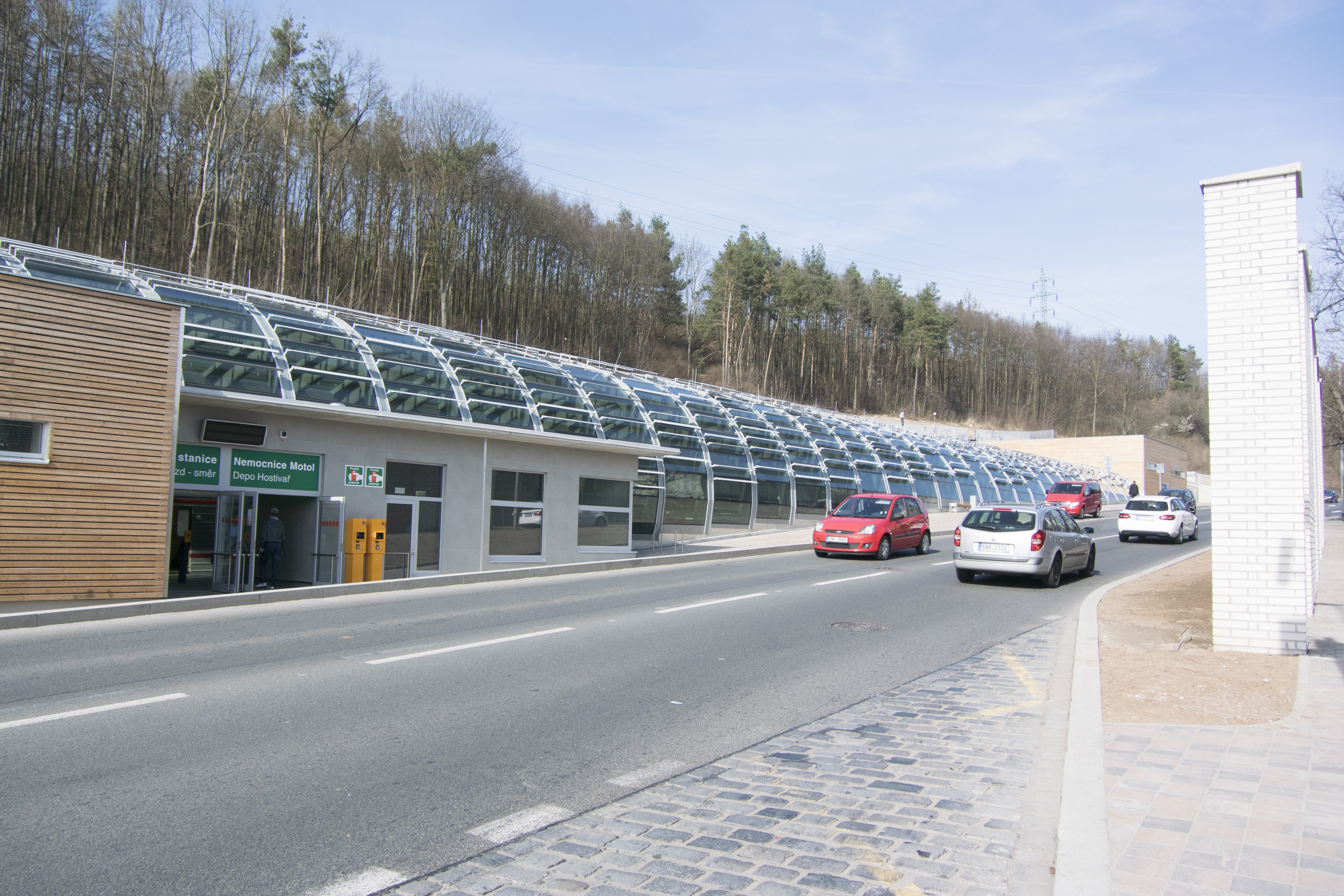
Station building.

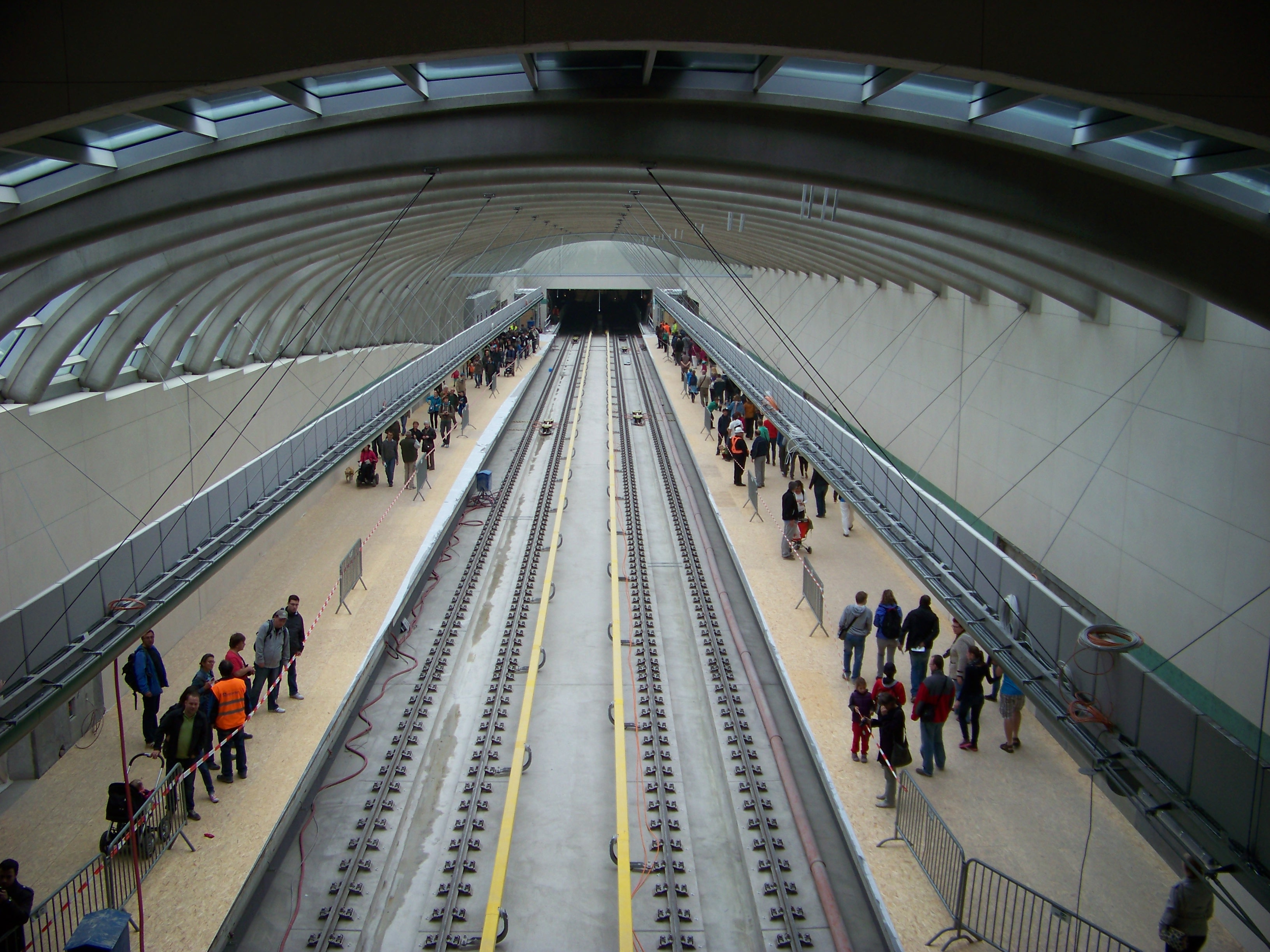
The station, still unfinished, on its first day of service.
