= Jiří Beránek =

Czech sculptor, painter, and university teacher

Prof., Acad. sculptor Jiří Beránek
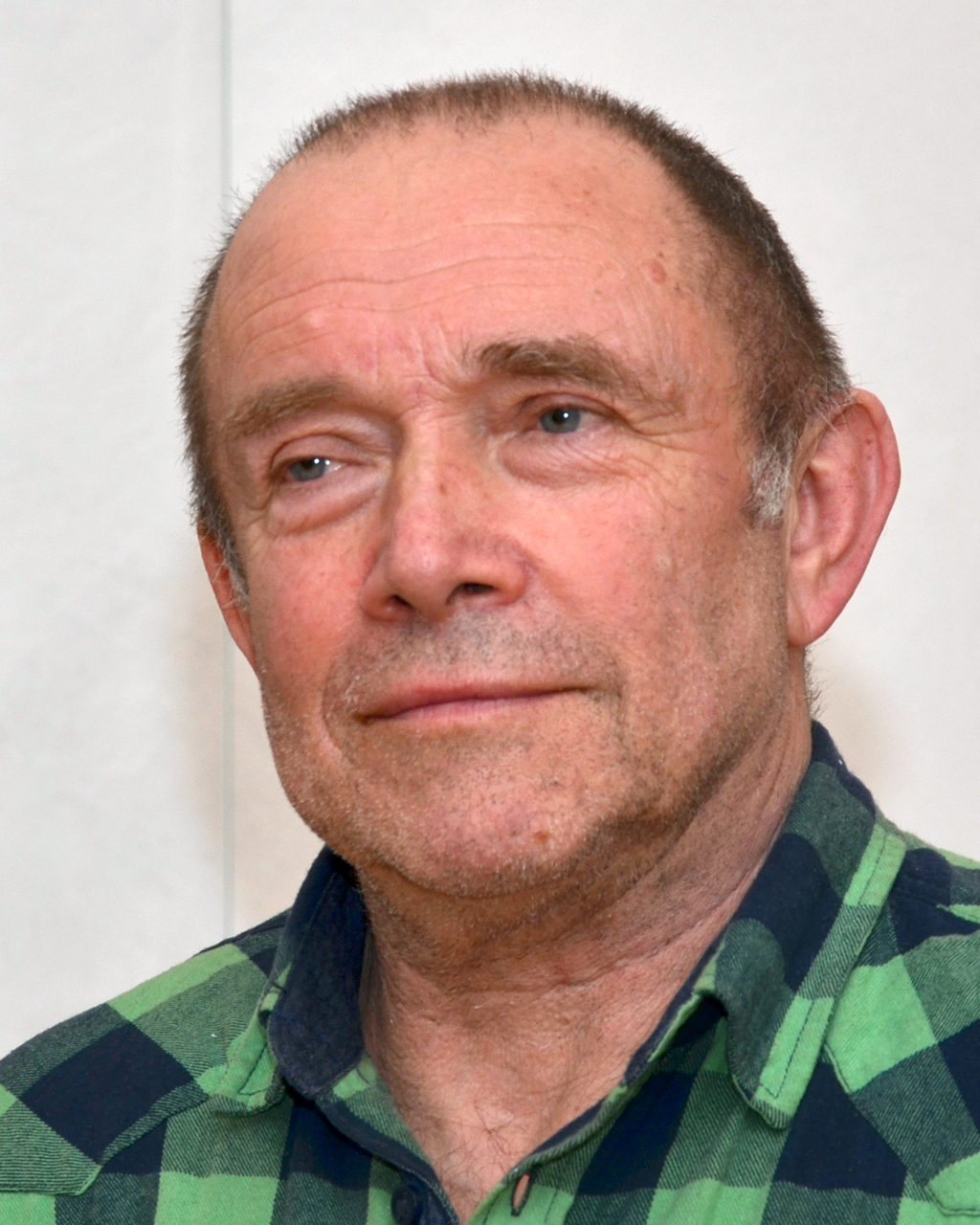
- Jiří Beránek in 2017
- Born: 21 November 1945; Borkovice, Czechoslovakia
- Died: 26 January 2021 (aged 75); Prague-Koloděje, Czech Republic
- Education: Academy of Fine Arts, Prague
- Known for: sculptor, painter, university teacher

Jiří Beránek (21 November 1945 – 26 January 2021) was a Czech sculptor, painter, university teacher and creator of conceptual and land art projects. He belongs to the generation that began studying in the free atmosphere of the 1960s, but left university in the worst period of the normalization. The wider public could get acquainted with his work only after the fall of the communist regime.

== Life ==
Jiří Beránek came from a South Bohemian family of forest engineers. He spent his childhood on a farm and in the Beskydy countryside, and this experience was decisive for his later work. The family moved to Luhačovice, where his father got a job as a forester and later as a surveyor of forest roads. Jiří Beránek often helped him as a figurehead and travelled through a large part of the Beskydy Mountains. After finishing primary school, he attended the Václav Hollar Art School in Prague from 1961 to 1965. After graduating from high school, he passed exams at the Czech Technical University in Prague, but then preferred to study sculpture.

In 1966–1972 he studied at the Academy of Fine Arts in Prague under Professor Vincenc Makovský and after his death under Professor Karel Lidický. In 1968 he spent holidays travelling around[Italy. He graduated from the Academy of Fine Arts in 1971 and considered entering the theological seminary in Olomouc, but soon afterwards he married and returned to northern Moravia. Together with the painters Anežka and Miroslav Koval, he moved to an old cottage in Sobotín, worked as a forest worker and painted portraits so as not to lose his status as a freelance artist. He began to work on land art projects and made contacts with the unofficial art scene. His marriage broke down at that time.

The cottage in Sobotín was visited by art critiques and organizers of unofficial art exhibitions Marcela Pánková, Alena Potůčková and Marie Černá. Jiří Beránek participated in the first unofficial exhibitions in Prague in 1973 (Sculpture Meeting, Vojanovy sady, Theatre in Nerudovka). At the end of the 1970s he visited the photographer Miroslav Pokorný in the Gratzen Mountains and created sculptures made of oak wood and installations made of peat or hay and straw. He had his first solo exhibition in 1979 at the Museum of Homeland History in Šumperk. From 1982 he participated in meetings of his generational comrades with Jindřich Chalupecký in Petr Pavlík's studio, where the foundation of the future art group was formed. Until 1989 he participated in various private art activities, especially in the Hůla brothers' gallery in Kostelec nad Černými lesy, which he helped to build as a sculptor. Unofficial exhibitions were monitored by the StB and some were prematurely closed down. Jiří Beránek could only exhibit in small galleries outside the centre (Gong Theatre, Gallery H, Gallery Opatov, Koloděje) during the normalization period. In 1985 he married his second wife Jolanta, with whom he has three children. He moved with her to a house with a garden in Koloděje, where much of his work was created.

He was a founding member of the Free Association 12/15, Late But Still and the New Group. Immediately after the fall of communism, Jiří Beránek participated in the exhibition Inoffiziell Kunst der ČSSR 1968–89 in Regensburg (1990), in 1990 in a generous project of 40 Czechoslovak artists in Paris with his installation Resurrection and in the exhibition Czech Art in the Velvet Revolution in New York City. The first domestic group exhibitions of Jiří Beránek's work were held in the 1990s by the Art Gallery in Karlovy Vary and the castle in Jindřichův Hradec. In 1991 he received a creative scholarship from the Pollock-Krasner Foundation and during the 1990s he stayed twice in the United States and exhibited in Finland, Norway, Sweden, Denmark, Switzerland and the Netherlands. From 1993 he worked as a teacher at the Academy of Arts, Architecture and Design in Prague, and after his habilitation (1996) as the head of the newly founded sculpture studio Sculpture II, which he led until 2008. In 2001 he was appointed professor at the Academy of Arts, Architecture and Design in Prague. Since 2007, he has worked at the Ladislav Sutnar Faculty of Design and Art at the University of West Bohemia in Plzeň, where he founded the sculpture studio.

Jiří Beránek lived and worked in Prague-Koloděje and at the University of West Bohemia in Plzeň. He died on 26 January 2021 after a short and severe illness.

== Work ==
Sculptor Jiří Beránek belonged to a generation of artists who, as fresh graduates of art colleges, had to define themselves in their work during the oppression and subsequent "moral unrest" of the normalization 1970s. However, the existential essence of his work, which is a reflection of this bleak reality, also represented an effort to maintain a continuity with the dynamic art of the 1960s, which the normalization regime tried to completely interrupt. Beránek's generation drew attention to the disintegration of the value system of society and attempted to form its own artistic order derived from personal ethical standards. The tendency to dematerialize art, which dominated Western Europe at the same time, had only a limited influence on the local scene. Most artists remained faithful to the painting or sculpture, but experimented with disrupting their traditional form. As a typical feature of generational aesthetics, individual reflection on current psychological and social reality often manifested itself in the disintegration of the figure, linking Beránek's work with the allied painters Vladimír Novák and Petr Pavlík.

Maintaining the space of artistic freedom, preserving the continuity of Czech modern art and the plurality of opinions characteristic of the previous period was the most important feature of the entire generation of his contemporaries. They replaced their sceptical attitude towards the normalising social atmosphere and the resulting personal distance with seriousness, introvertedness and an emphasis on the ethical mission of art. Their work can be considered a special manifestation of Czech cultural identity.

=== Sculptures and objects ===
At the beginning of Beránek's oeuvre is his perfect familiarity with the carpenter's craft and the construction of rural wooden buildings. He works mainly with wood, using a chainsaw, an axe and chisels. He uses finer tools mostly only to cut out precise shapes and cavities used to join parts with wooden pins. He is inspired by objects made from natural materials, shapes tested by function and refined by daily use, things elevated by function to perfect form. In his work, both kinds of art – sculpture and construction – are combined in a special and inimitable way. Beránek was the first to discover the possibilities of monumental wooden sculpture at the intersection of sculpture, object, architecture and environment. He thus opened up the space for a specific current of radical sculpture that is based on the craftsmanship tradition of woodworking. His followers include Magdalena Jetelová, Jan Ambrůz and Václav Fiala. He is one of the pioneers of land art and his interest is not limited to sculptural objects, but to modelling the landscape itself. Beránek's early spatial assemblage Castle (1968) reflects one of his many literary inspirations.

Beránek's academic training as a sculptor was influenced by the avant-garde past of Prof. Vincenc Makovský and was an inspiration for him in the early formative years. His familiarity with Czech and European modern art was evident in his early still lifes and figures, which testify to his perfect absorption and individual transformation of the impulses of Cubism, Expressionism and Surrealism (The Weight of Time, 1968, Lord of the Flies, 1972, Crucified, 1972). Already at this time, he completed some figures with polychromy (Lot's Wife, 1973, Museum Kampa, Morána, 1974). At the same time, from the gradual fragmentation of the figure (Salome, 1973), he arrived at abstract forms of sculptural still lifes that address the central problem of the sculpture's interior space and the aesthetic arrangement of interrelationships. The individual elements at first loosely fill the given framework (Cube, 1973), but soon determine their surroundings themselves (Courtyard, 1985, Sanctuary, 1987) The idea of the "inhabited, used sculpture" is one of the main innovations he brought to Czech art.

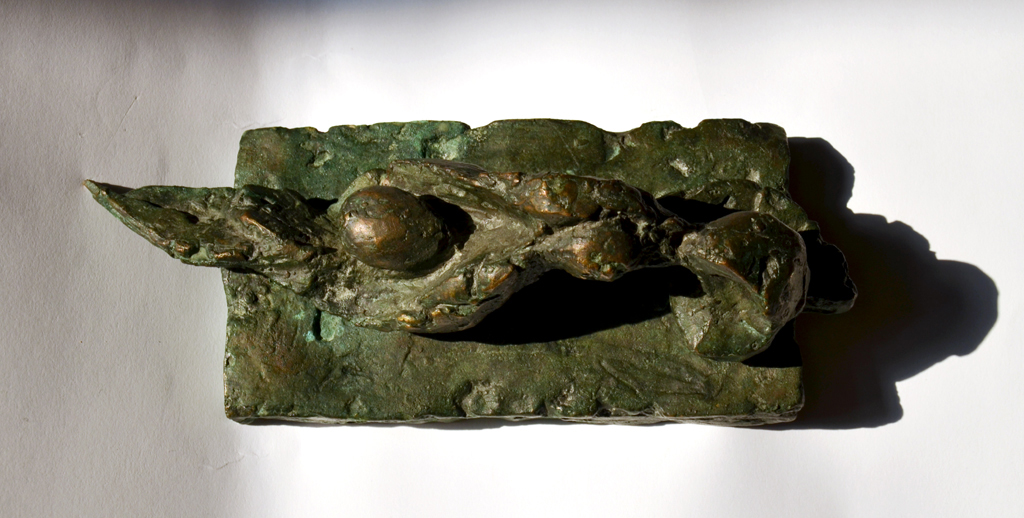
Monument to Birds, bronze (1968)

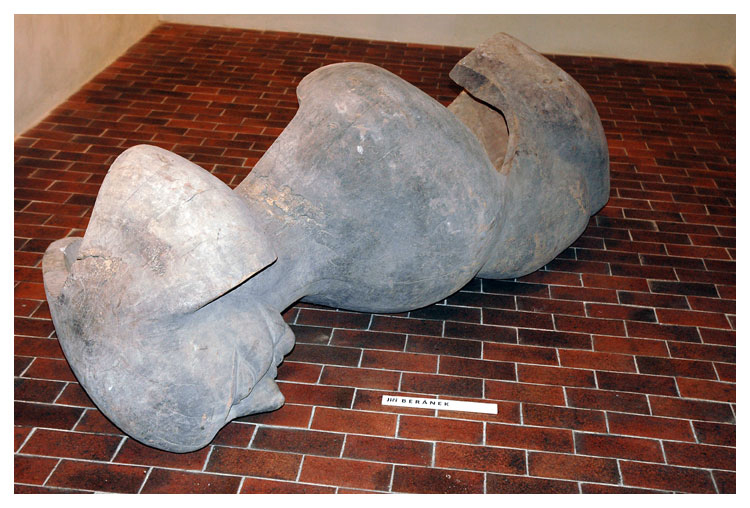
Ferry-boat (1972)

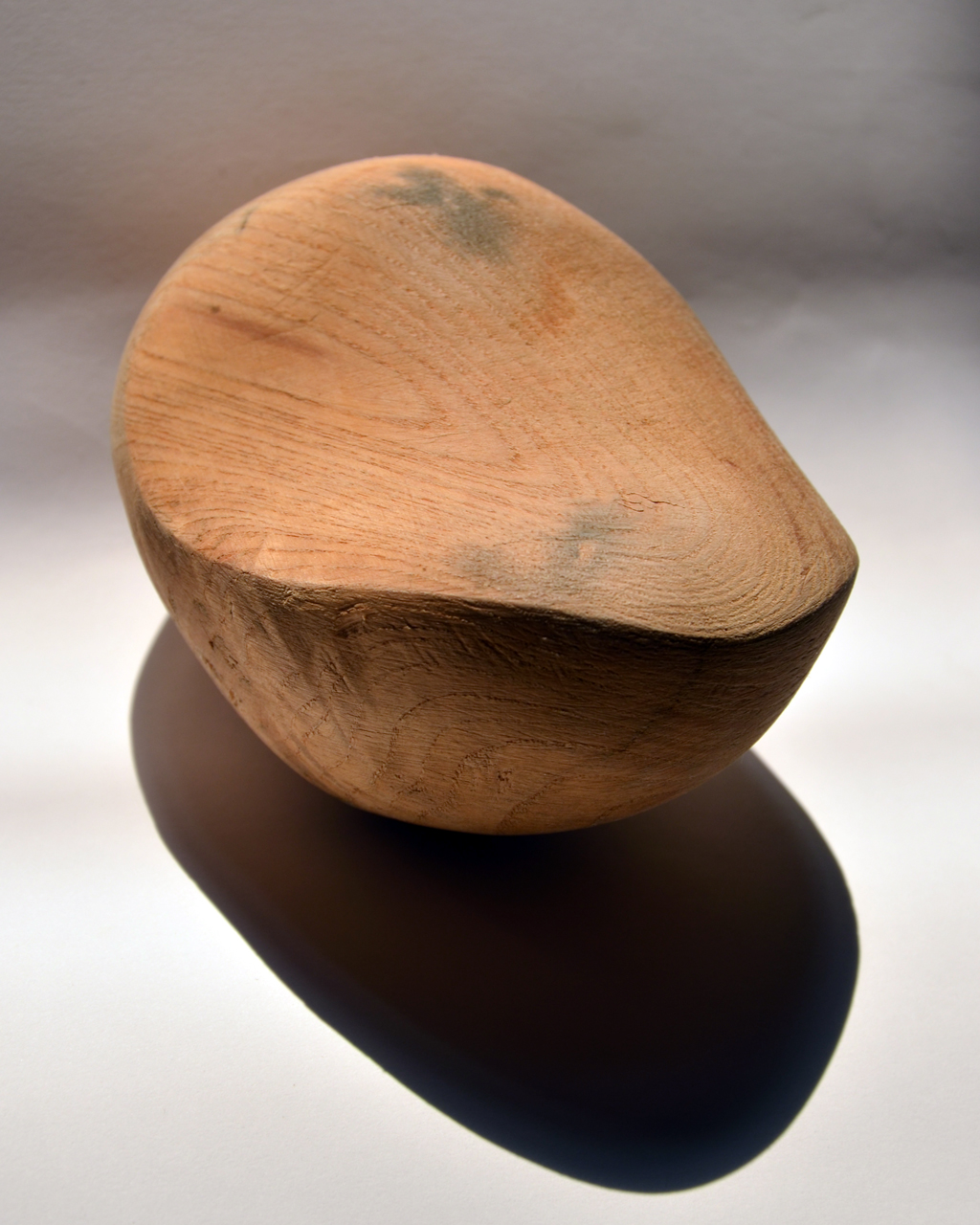
Sculpture to Caress (1980s)

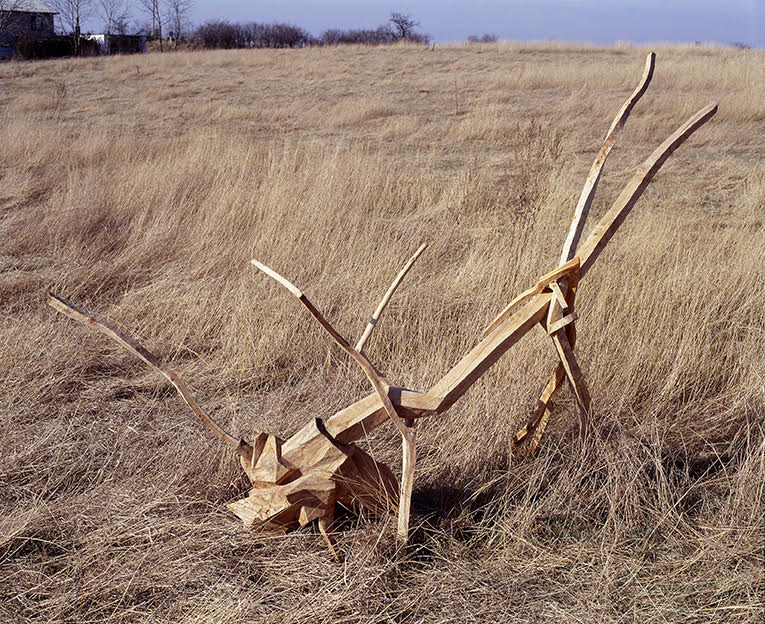
Plough

The sculptor distinguishes the first romantic phase of his work, which focused on the perfect spatial harmony of volumes and biomorphic shapes, with obvious references to baroque morphology (The Way of the Cross, 1972–1975, Germination, 1972, Cube, 1973, V-shaped object, 1975, Plough, 1978). His other sculptural works are characterized by a simple and functional structure, related to the rustic tradition. They are related to the function of the objects either directly (Library, 1982 Bed, 1982) or by their names implying some function (Chest, 1980, Beehive, 1980, Nook, 1982). Sculptures composed of multiple parts are composed in such a way that their relative position always newly respects the environment in which they are set. Thus, the sculptures enter their surroundings and at the same time are influenced by them (Rock City, 1979, Beehive, 1980).

Jiří Beránek's subsequent work cannot simply be characterized as a linear sequence of time periods, as the sculptor strives primarily for the spiritual integrity of the work and is less interested in formal development. A work can be a wooden sculpture as well as an object in the landscape. They are united by the need to uncover buried levels of consciousness, to return to ancient myths (Sacrifice, 1991, Oracle, 1996–1997) and to create their own symbols of what can be perceived as a home-castle or refuge (Fortification, 1988, Refuge, 1996, Watchtower, 2005). The existential message of the work is not easy to decipher and takes place on the level of the subconscious. The artist's terrifying dream of being cornered and stoned (The Corner, 1982) indicates a pile of rocks that have partially spilled on the ground.

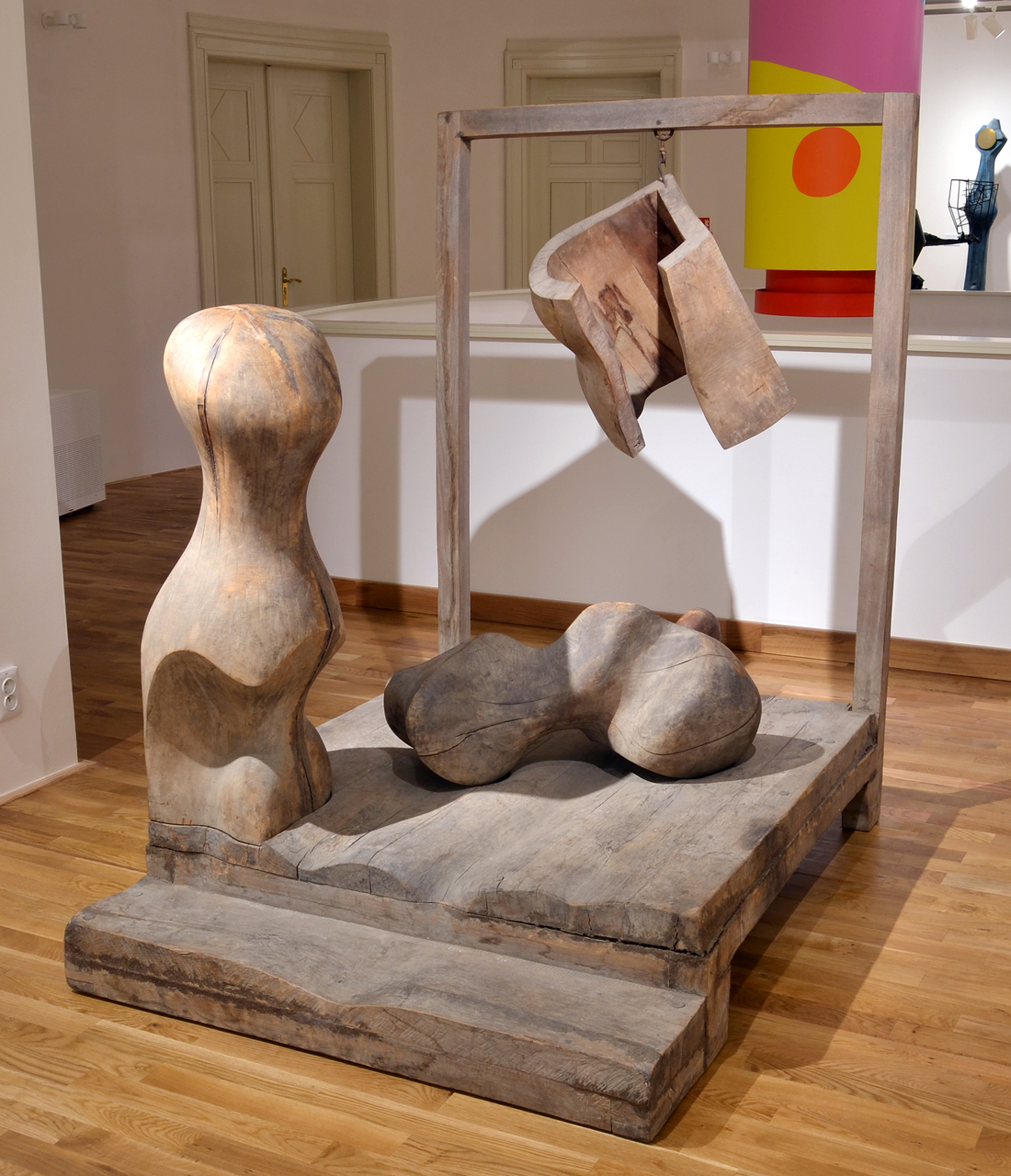
The Weight of Time II (1969–1974), Gallery of modern art, Hradec Králové

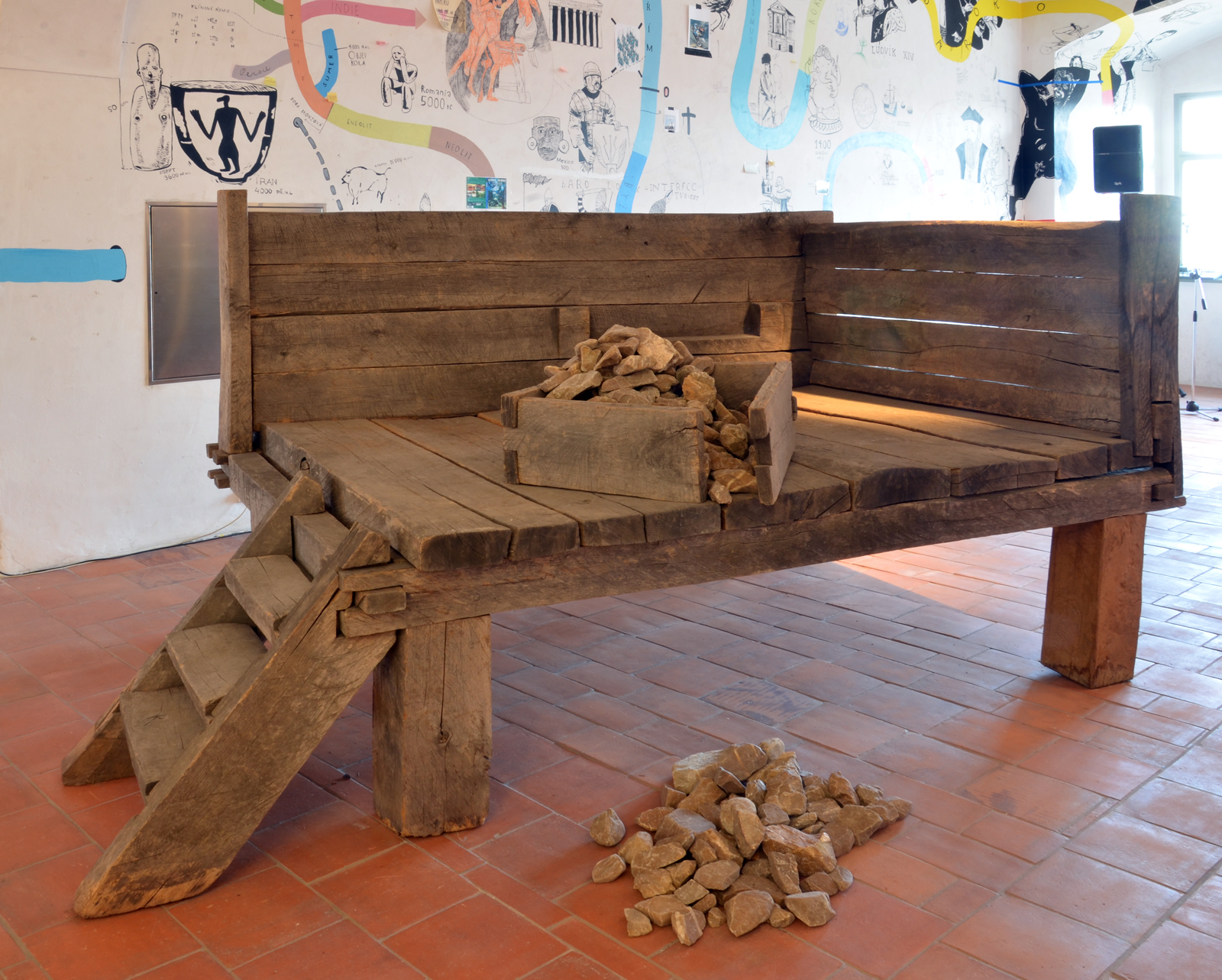
Corner (1983), Gallery of the Central Bohemian region, Kutná Hora

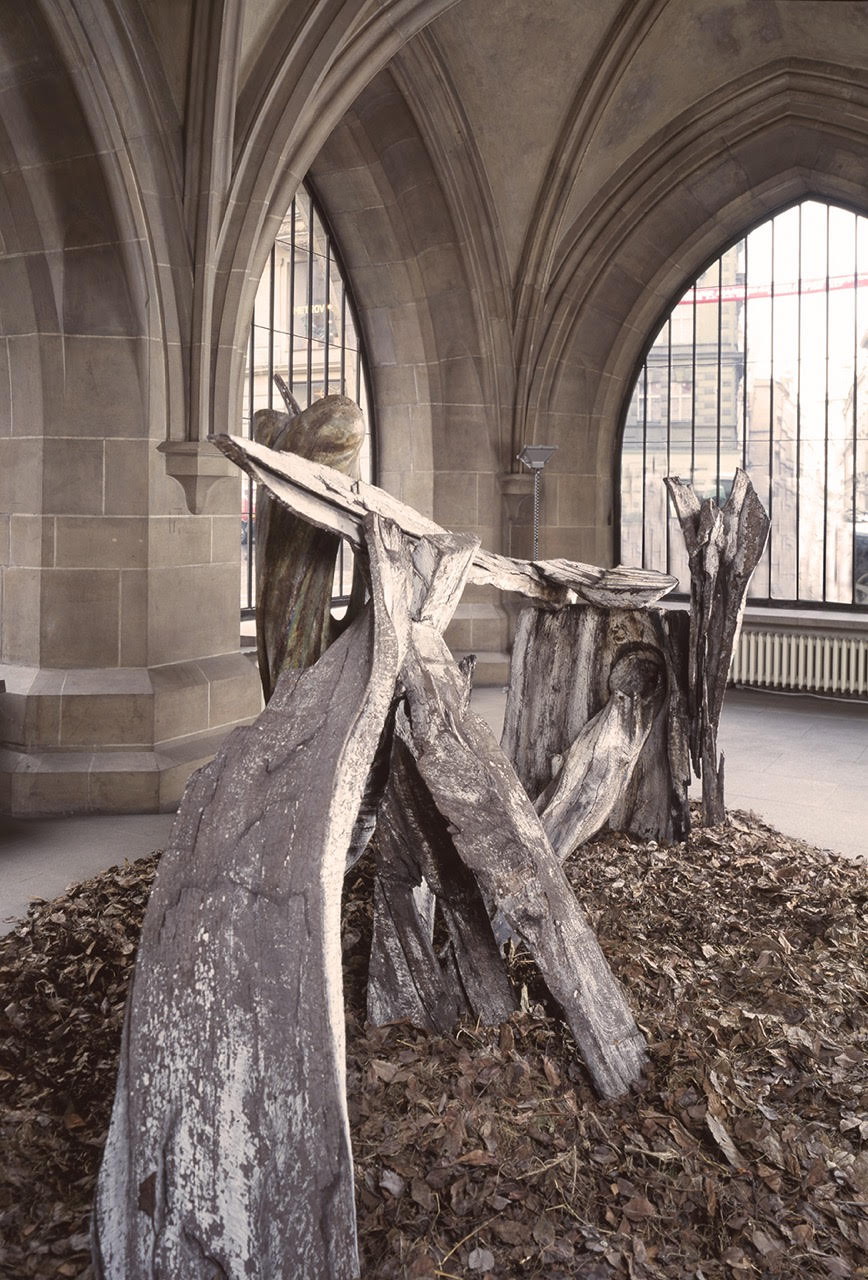
A Place Not Yet Abandoned (1994)

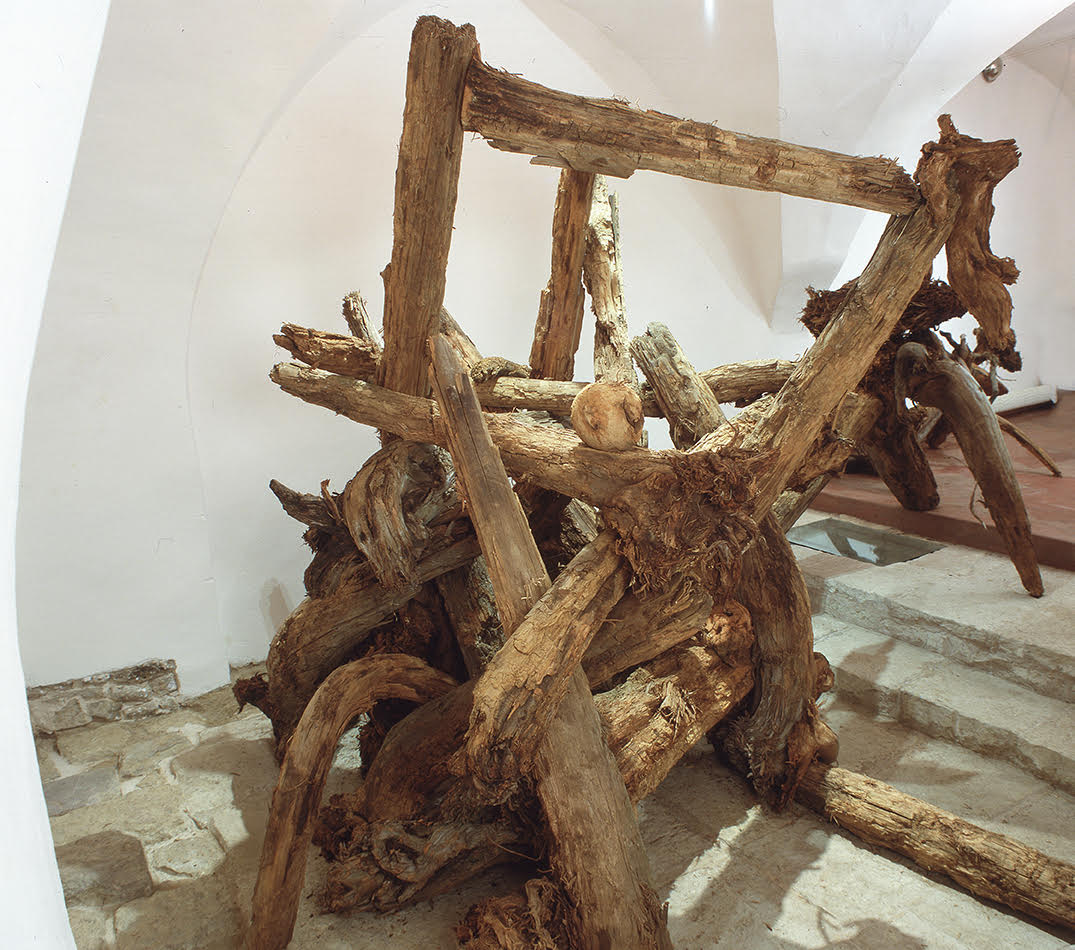
Cloning (1996)

An integral part of the message of his works is to point to the constant cycle of nature's transformations, the birth of life, death and decay. He uses fragments of the wood of centuries-old oaks or tree roots, deposited for thousands of years in a layer of peat (Fall of Angels, 1996, Twilight of Memory, 1998, Klenová, 1999) to create a sculpture or a building. By the very choice (wood, peat, roots) the sculptor is still very close to natural processes. He removes some materials for a time to make an object and then returns them back or leaves them at the mercy of the weather (A Place Not Yet Abandoned, 1994, Cloning, 1996). His reverence for wood and living creatures has a sacred character (Monuments to Birds, 1968, Monument to Oak, 2001, Monument to Newt, 2004). A quite extraordinary work in the context of Czech sculpture is Beránek's monumental structure made of charred beams, called Resurrection, exhibited in the centre of Paris at La Défense in 1990 and later reconstructed in the nave of the Church of Our Lady in Slovany as the Triple House (1993–1994).

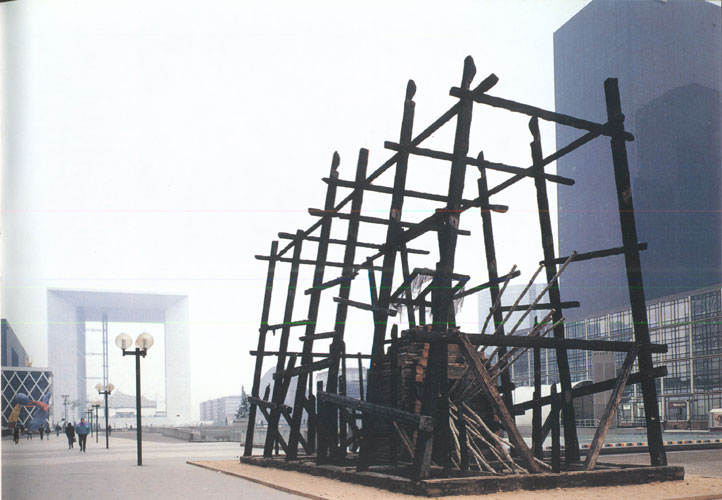
Resurrection (1990), La Défense, Paris

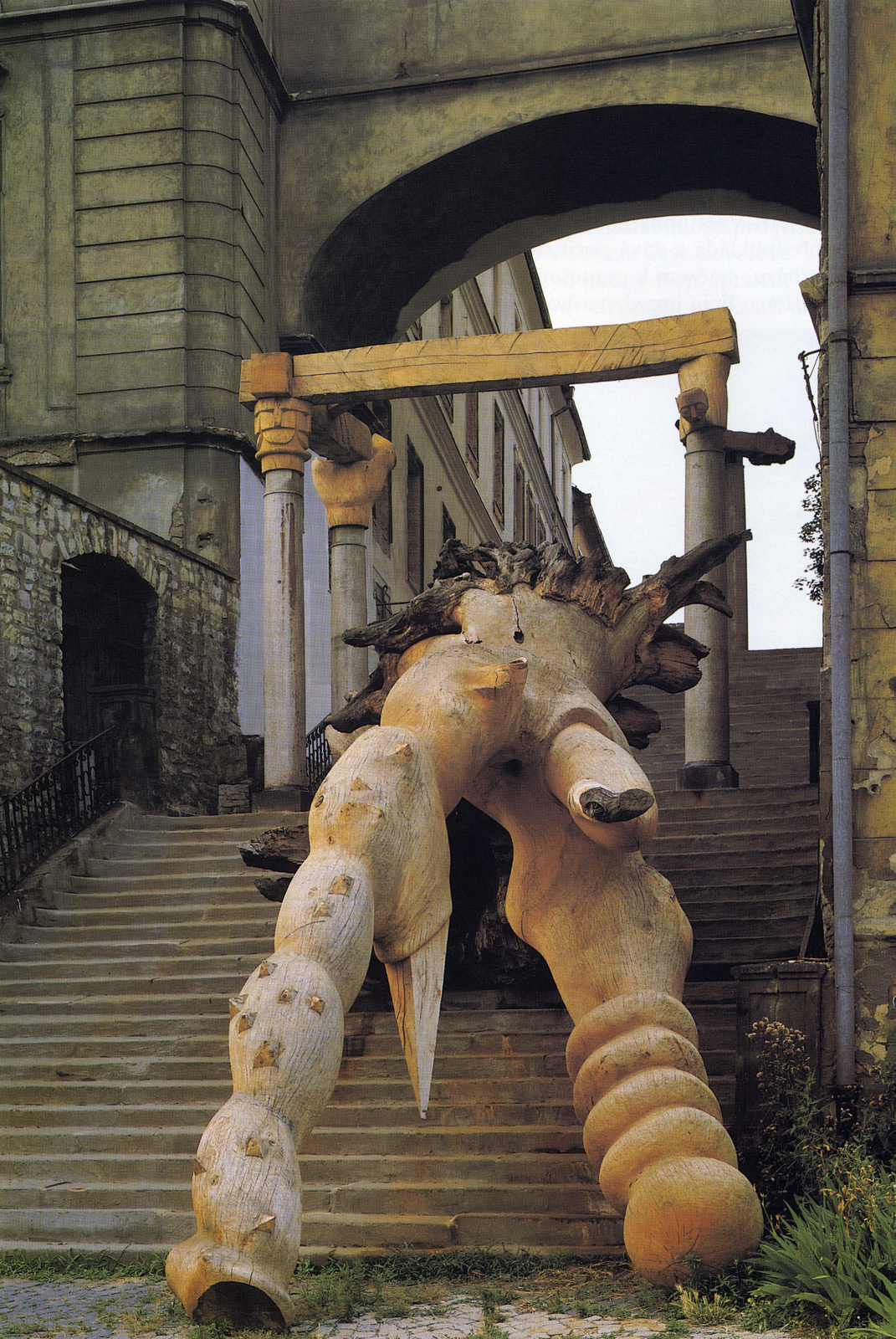
Not known from Where (1992), Litoměřice

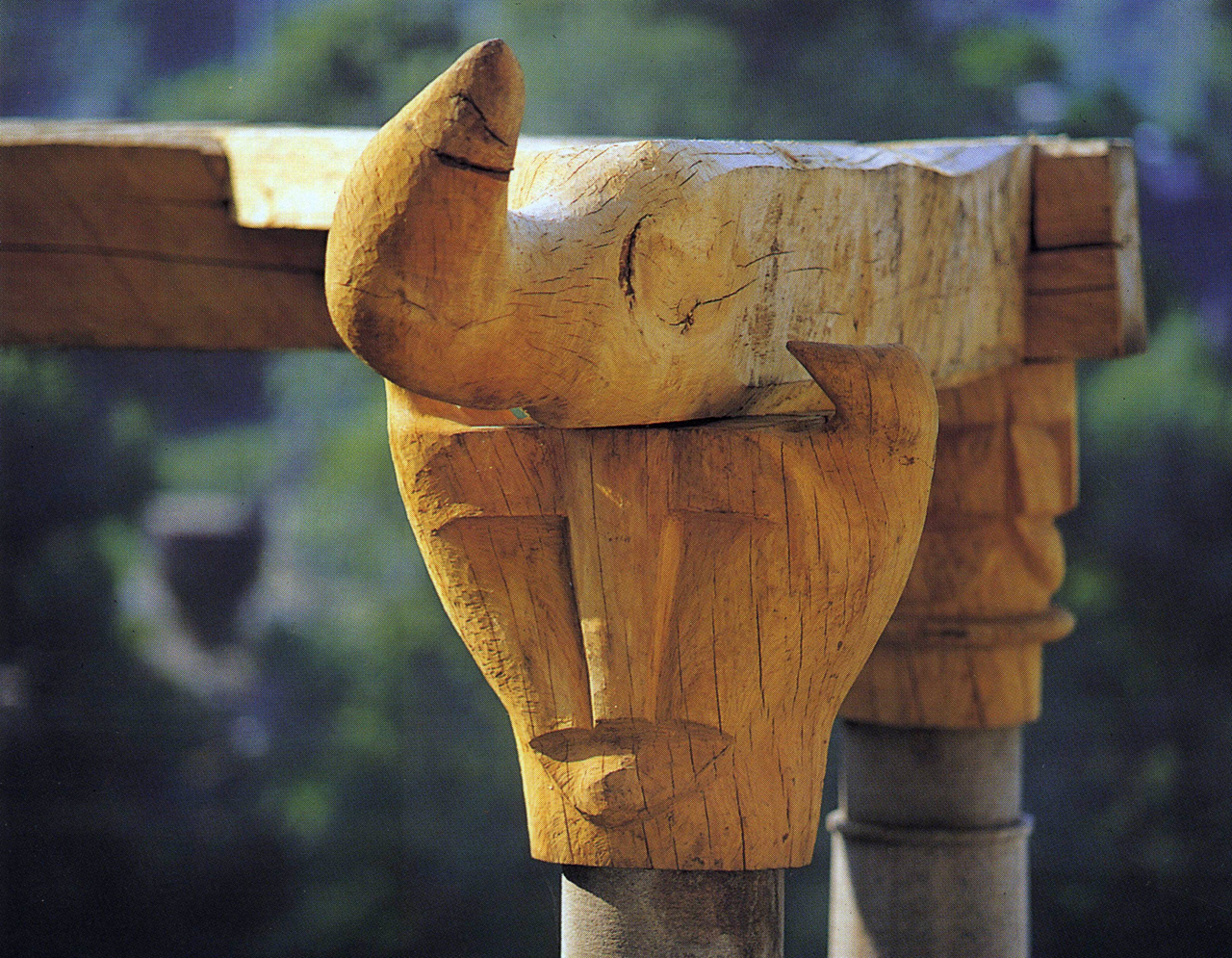
Not known from Where (1992), detail

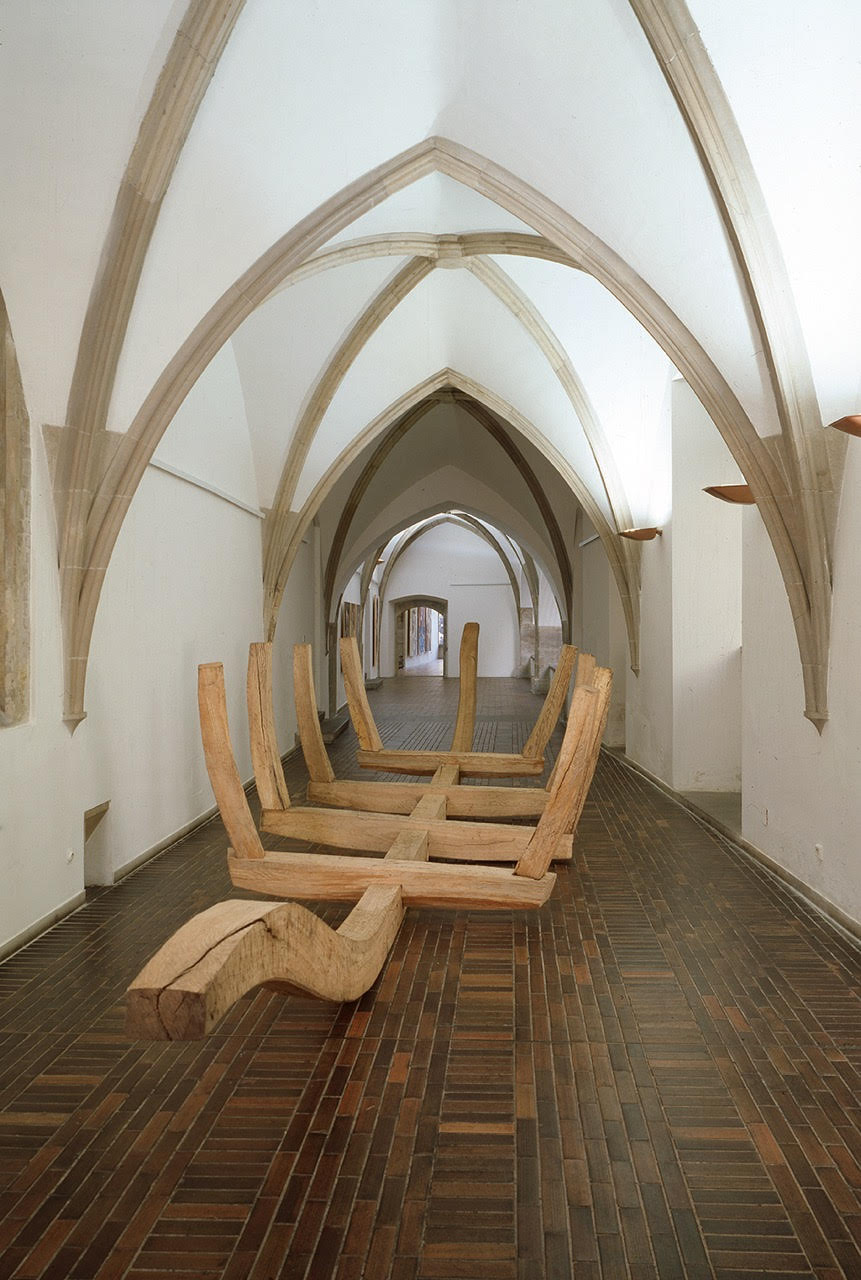
Boat (1994–1995), Karolinum, Charles University, Prague

Beránek's oak wood works have an unmistakable authorial signature. His abstract and figurative sculptures, which in their character and contrasts of massive volumes, smoothly transitioning into convex swells and concave depressions, point to the radical Baroque, also consciously claim the heritage of avant-garde organic sculpture (Ferry-boat, 1972, Sacrifice, 1989, Table, 2001, Grid, 2001). The sculptures, in their bulk, usually emphasize the monumentality of the centuries-old trees from which he created them, while at the same time impressing with their unexpectedly refined detailing. The artist's work always relates obligingly to place, history and memory and is organically incorporated into broader contexts (Not known from Where, 1991–1992, The Guardian, 1996, 1999) Some works, on the other hand, can be quite intimate in scale, designed to be touched (Sculpture to Caress, 1980s).

Other works are assembled as spatial drawings from naturally curved branches that the sculptor has merely roughly worked and pinned together, leaned against or folded into a new context of meaning (Suddenly Abandoned Place, 1987, Falling to the Ground Floor, 1988, Naked in Thorns, 1990, Maze, 1991, In Captivity, 1995, Collapsing Edges, 2002) Sometimes the intricately curved shape of the wood itself is the reason for a separate sculpture (Mantis, 1997, Insect, 2002).

Some sculptures are covered with polychrome, which unifies the surface and makes local colour accents stand out (The Calling, 1988, Fall of the Angels, 1990, Wounded Deer, 2001). The painterly treatment of the sculptures is most in line with the work of Beránek's peers and often emphasizes their expressiveness or enhances their archaic and ritualistic character (Wondrous Feast, 1988, Sacrifice, 1991).

Jiří Beránek capitalized on his early experience with land art (Corridor, 1974, Metamorphosis of rock, 1975) in the post-1989 period, when the opportunity arose to realize some large-scale projects. A work that aroused both enthusiasm and criticism was his installation The Twilight of Memory (1998), in which he created a labyrinth of peat bricks and tree roots, preserved in peat for millennia, on the ground floor of the Queen Anne's Summer Palace as a reference to memory that transcends human life many times over. Their counterpart was a clean and minimalist display of twelve wooden spheres, representing both planets and apostles, on the top floor of the building.

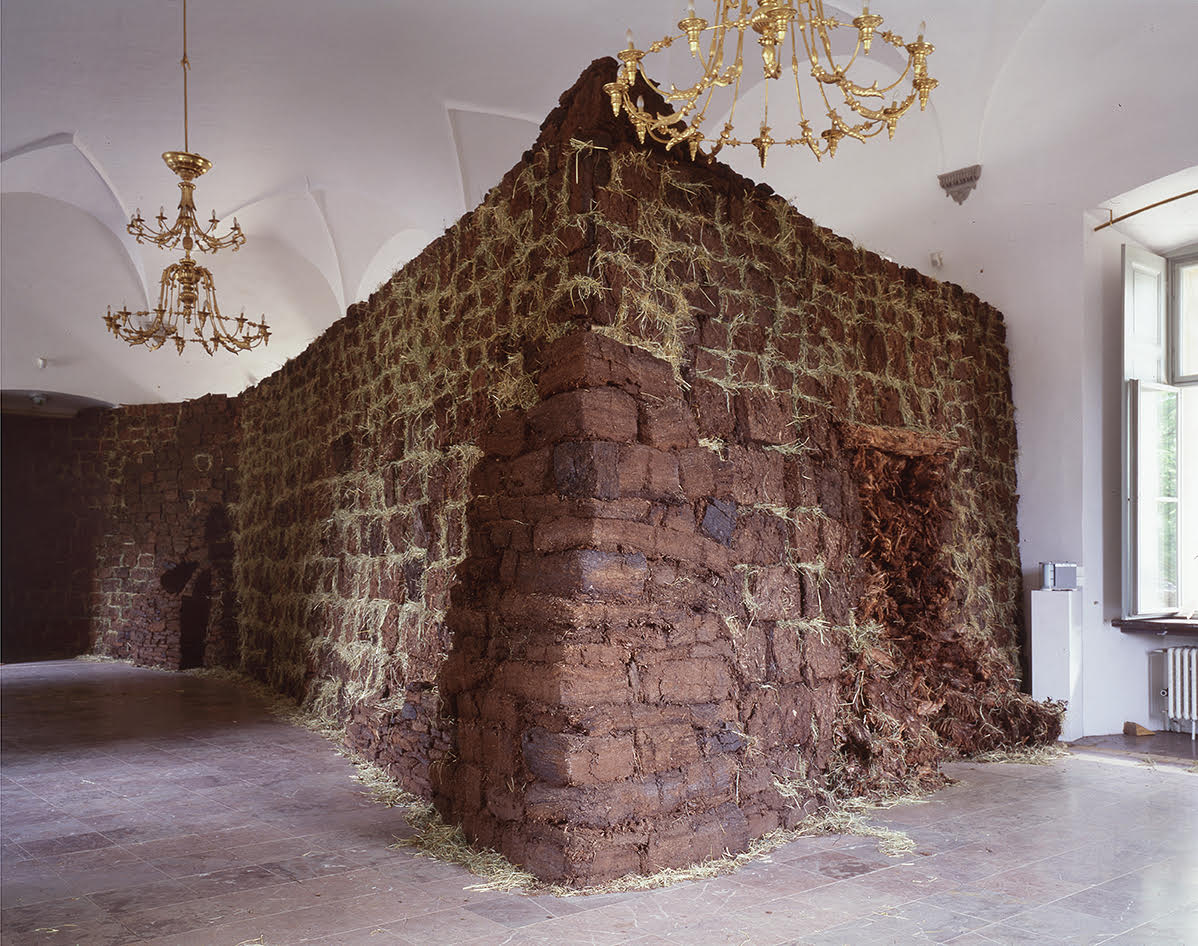
The Twilight of Memory (1998)

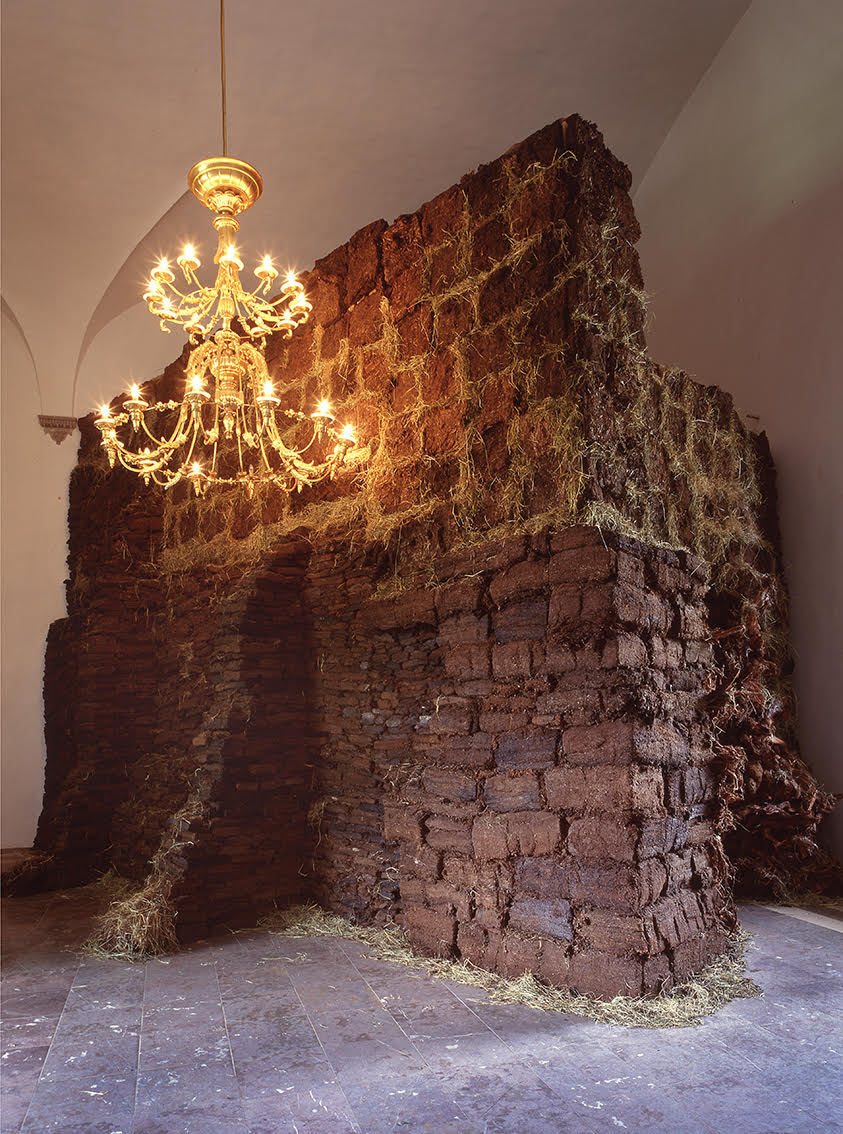
The Twilight of Memory (1998)

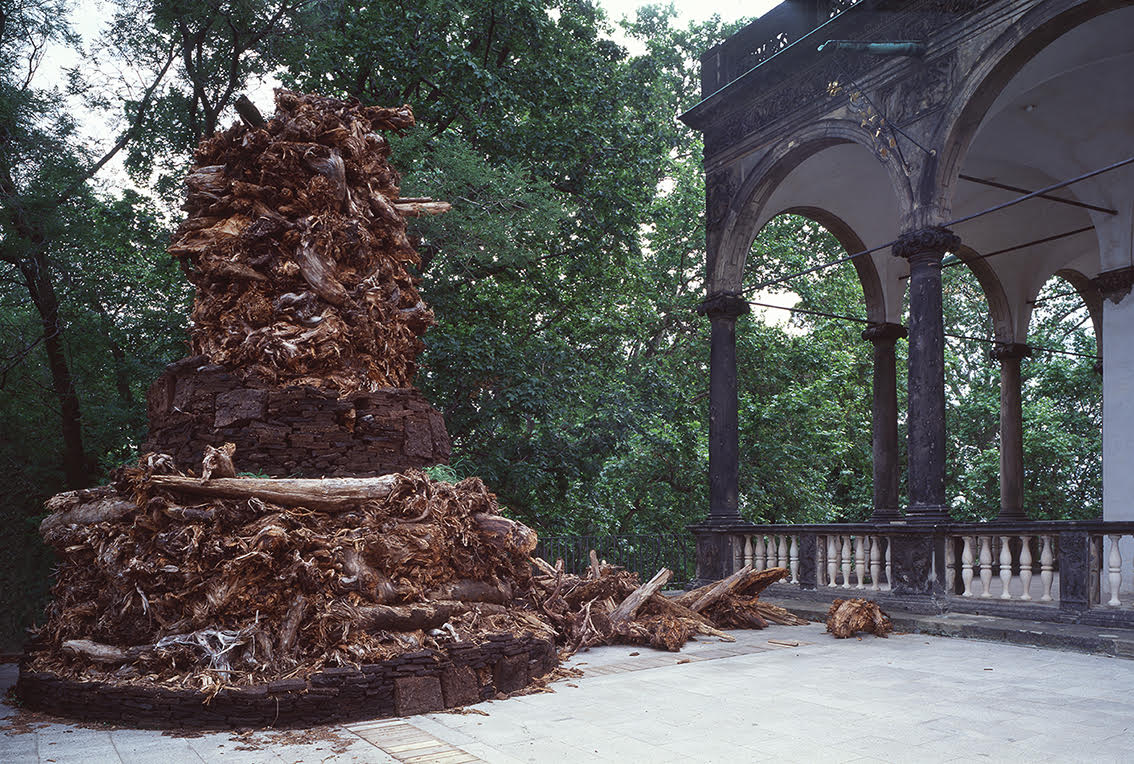
The Twilight of Memory (1998)

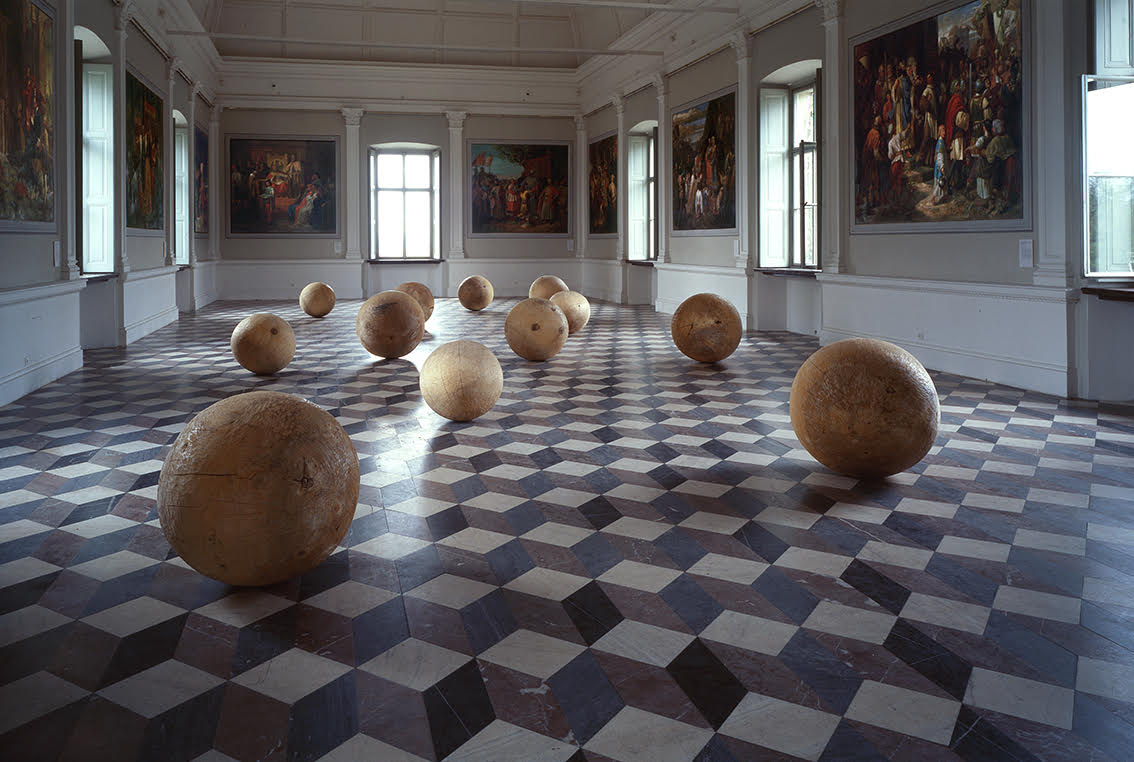
The Twilight of Memory (1998)

Similarly, he was able to spectacularly occupy the ground floor spaces of the castle in Jindřichův Hradec (Fall to the Ground Floor, Mantis, etc., 1997) or large industrial spaces (The Power of Silence, 2006, The factory hall of ČKD Dukla, Prague, The Power of Silence, 2012, Světovar industrial space, Plzeň). Beránek's work from several previous years was concentrated in Světovar. He commemorated his teacher Vincenc Makovský, the author of the key work of the Czech avant-garde, The Girl's Dream, with a monumental object made of crossed beams supporting an egg-shaped object.

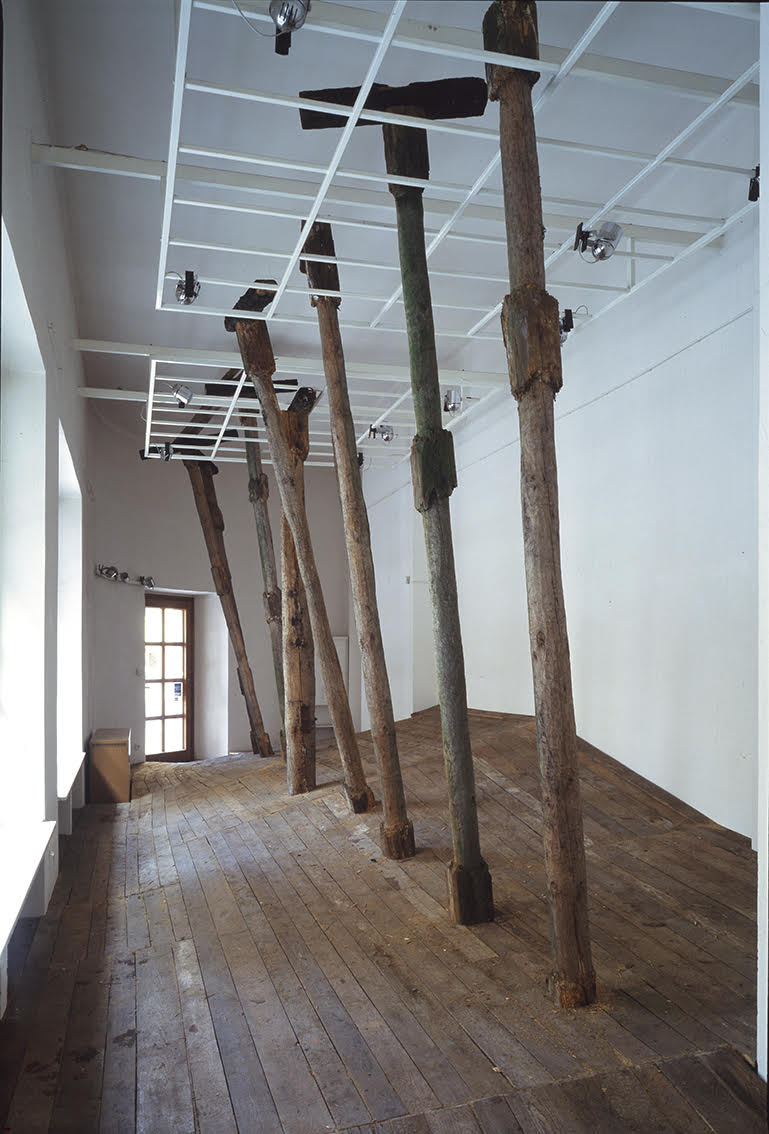
Tilting (1993)

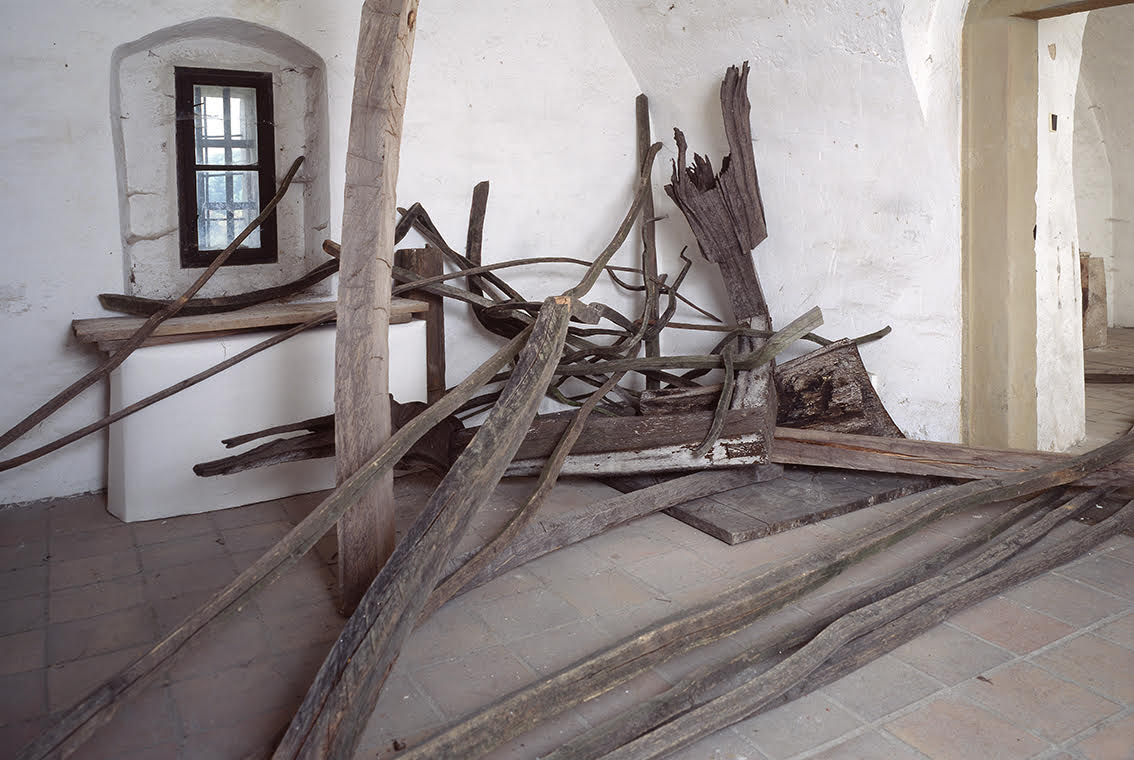
In Captivity (1995)

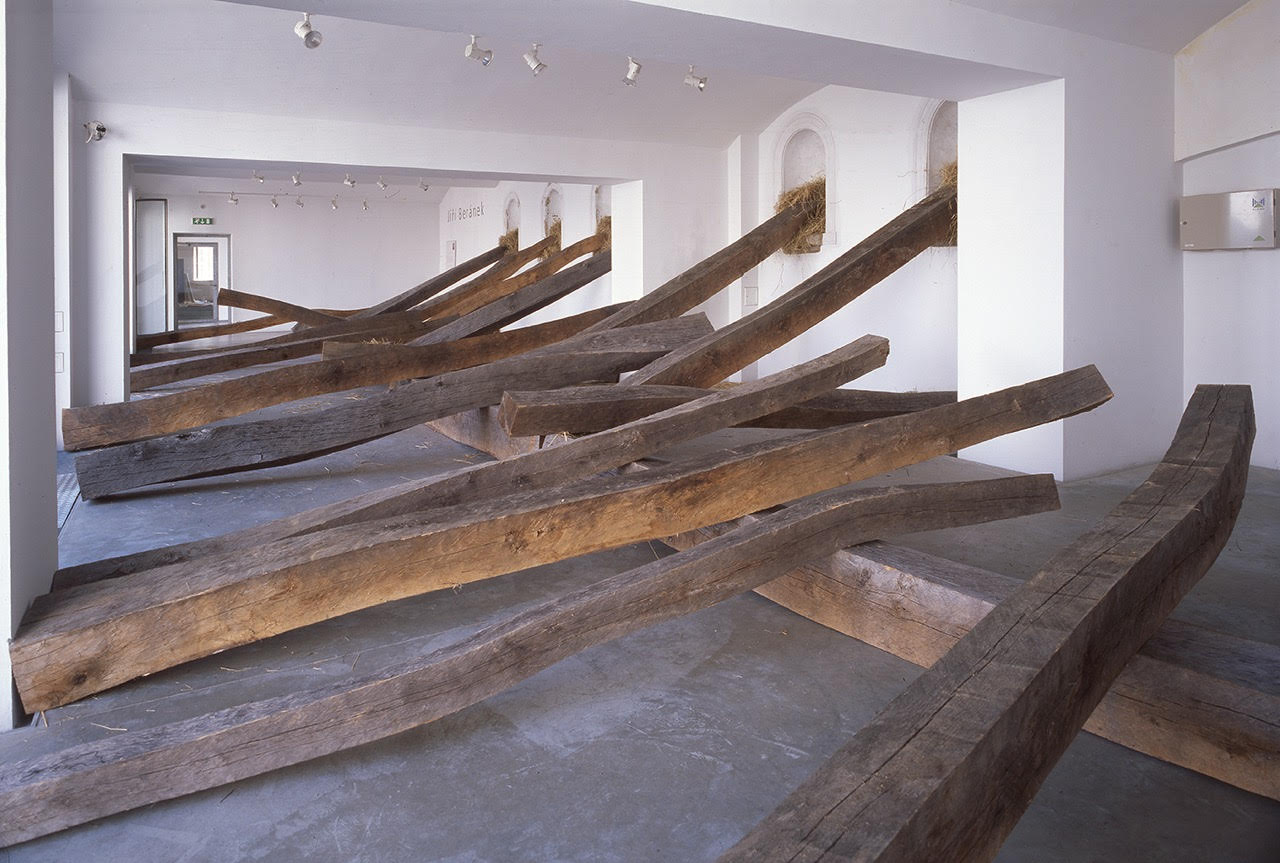
The Great Uncertainty (2003)

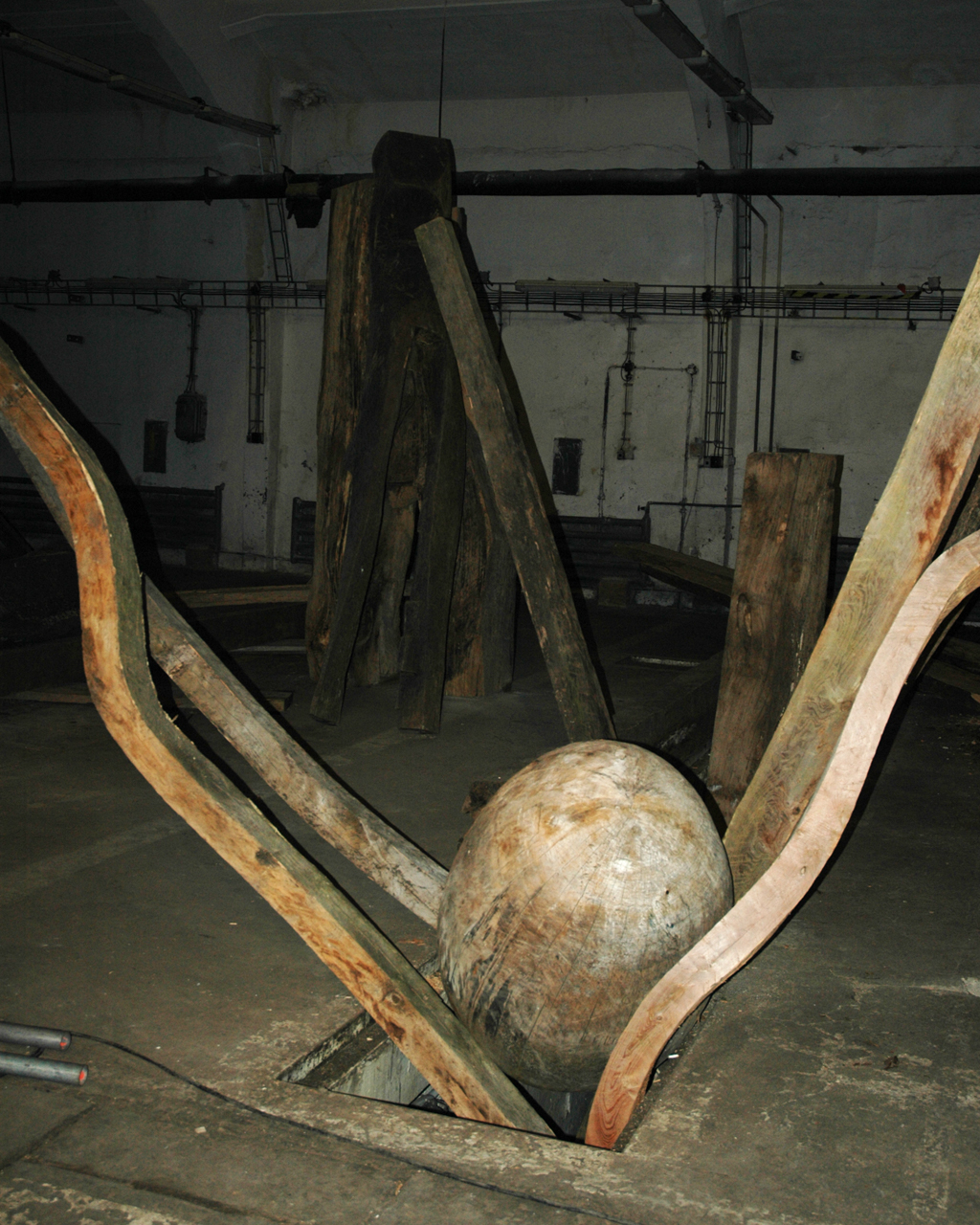
The Power of Silence, Světovar industrial space, Plzeň 2012

In smaller gallery spaces, Jiří Beránek reacts sensitively to the environment and creates conceptual installations that usually mean a radical reconstruction of the entire space. With the project Tilting (1993) he returned original slope of the terrain to the space of Via Art Gallery, located under the Church of St. Wenceslas in Prague. The tilted floor gives the viewer the same unsettling impression as the later installation of massive sloping beams that fills most of the space in the former horse stable, which serves as an exhibition space of the Museum Kampa (The Great Uncertainty, 2003). For the Litera Gallery, he created an installation of General Vlasov's "reconstructed" study to commemorate his contribution to the liberation of Prague (The Beam in Your Eye, 1994), and shortly before the devastating flood of 2002, he realized the project Drink for the Drowning, where water circulated in a closed labyrinth of glass tubes, animated by a flock of red daphnia.

Just as all modern European art consciously sought its roots in the ancient history of human culture, these references are omnipresent in Beránek's work (Timeless I, 1991). In addition to biblical times (Noah's Ark, 2004) and antiquity (Amphitheatre, Koloděje), his work relates directly to the most important periods of Czech culture – the Gothic (Homage to the Gothic, 1999) and Baroque (Homage to the Baroque, 1988–1989, Not known from Where, 1991–1992). The monumental character of these works testifies to the depth of the experience of Christian heritage.

For the entire generation of Jiří Beránek, whose twenty years of the most fruitful life were stolen by the Communist regime, protected by the occupying forces, and who were prevented from exhibiting and travelling, that time is irreplaceable. The author therefore perceives the factor of time as an inevitable weight bearing down on man (The Weight of Time, 1994–1996). The period that is usually perceived as a kind of timelessness between the relative freedom of the 1960s and the fall of the communist regime was reflected by Beránek in his generous installation at Gallery of the Central Bohemian Region (Intermediate Period, 2015). To recall the cold, heartless and raw reality of the time when the Jesuit college served as a military barracks, he installed objects from military warehouses in the exhibition, which also symbolize the four elements – water, air, fire and earth.

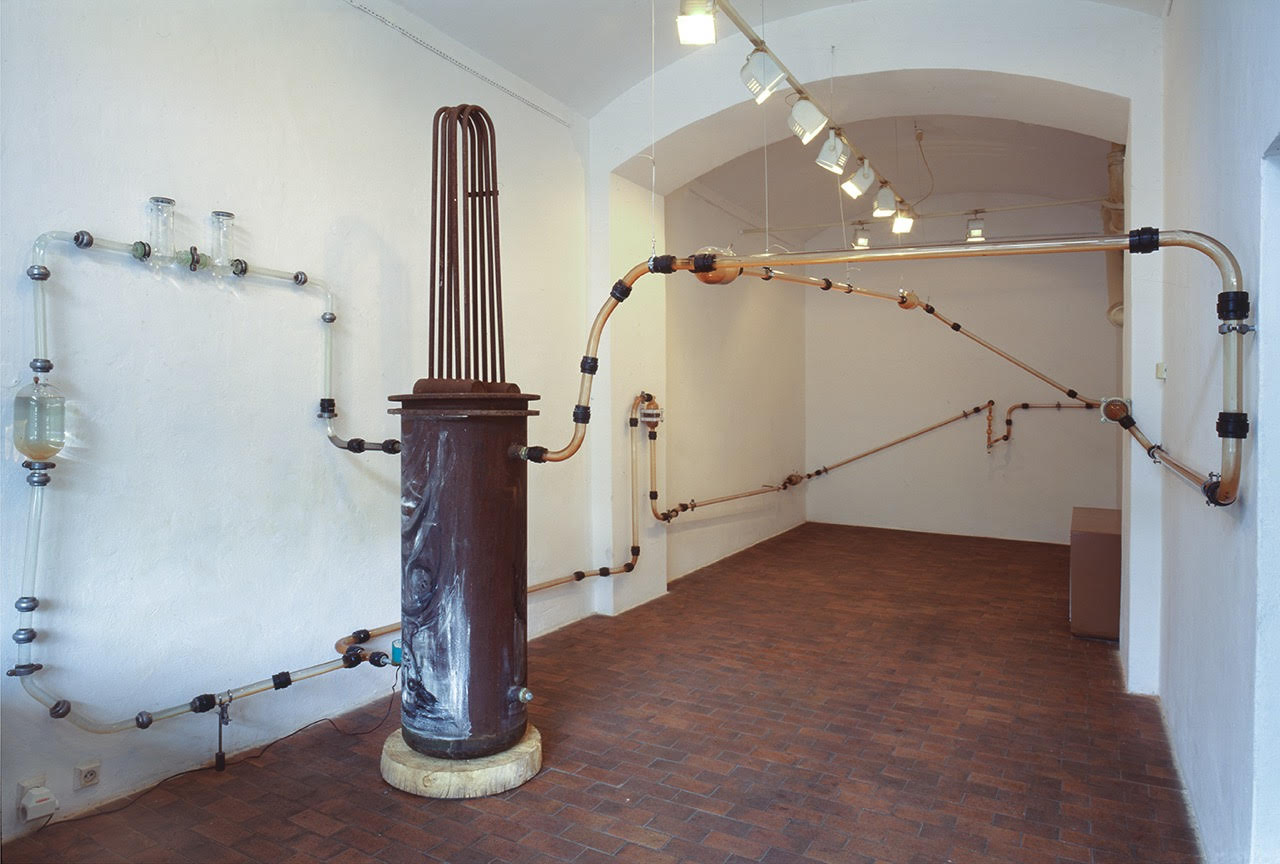
Drink for the Drowning (2002)

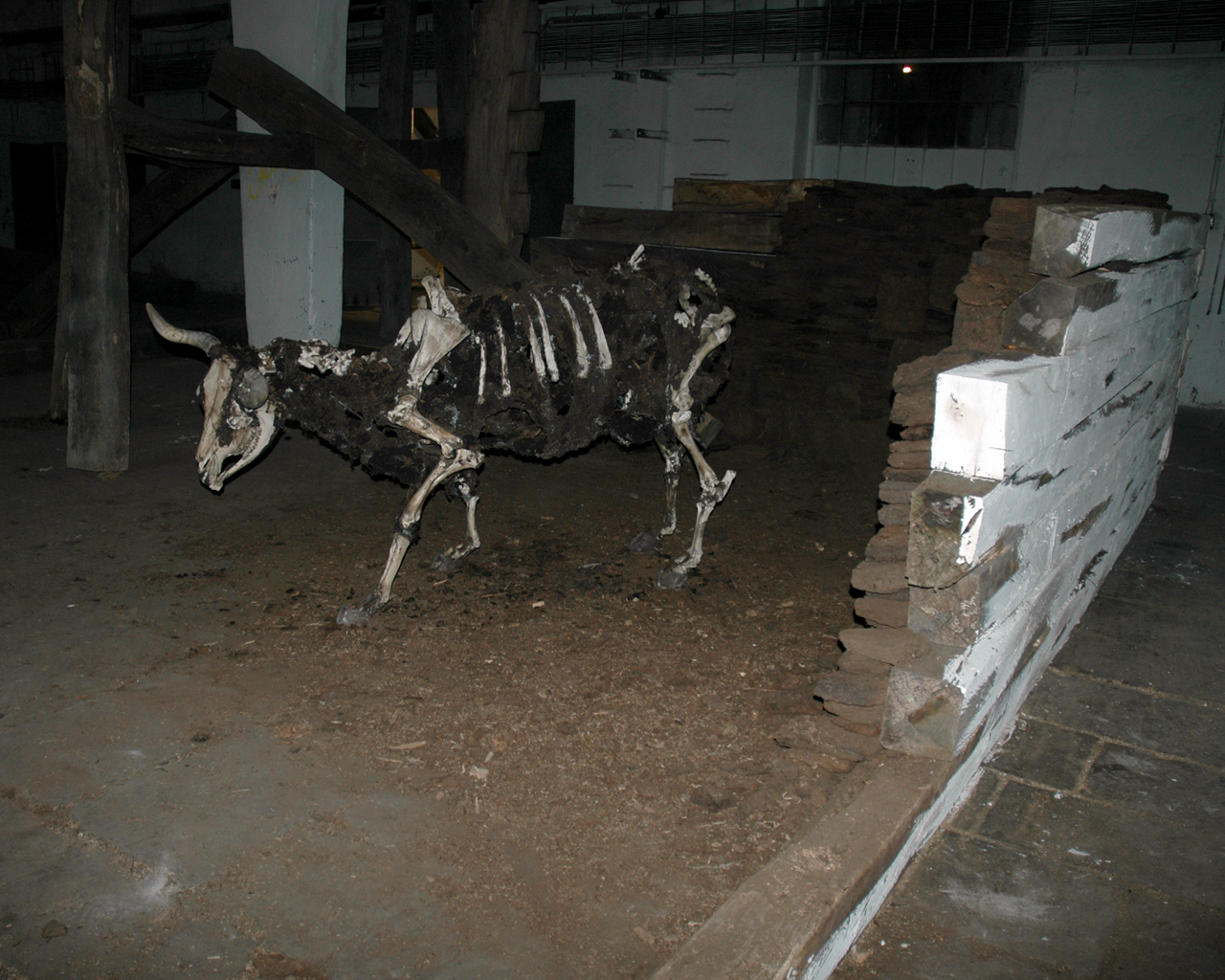
The Power of Silence, industrial space Světovar, Plzeň 2012

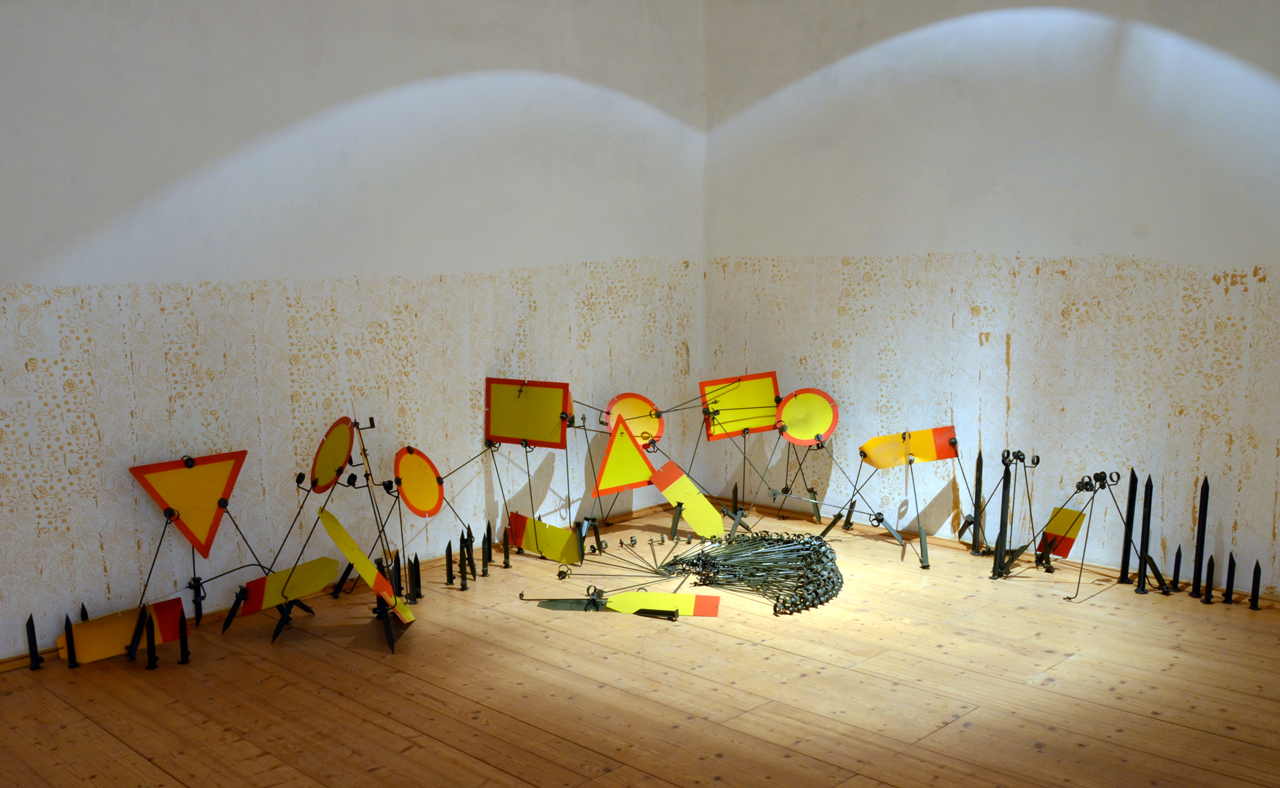
Intermediate Period, Gallery of the Central Bohemian Region in Kutná Hora, 2015

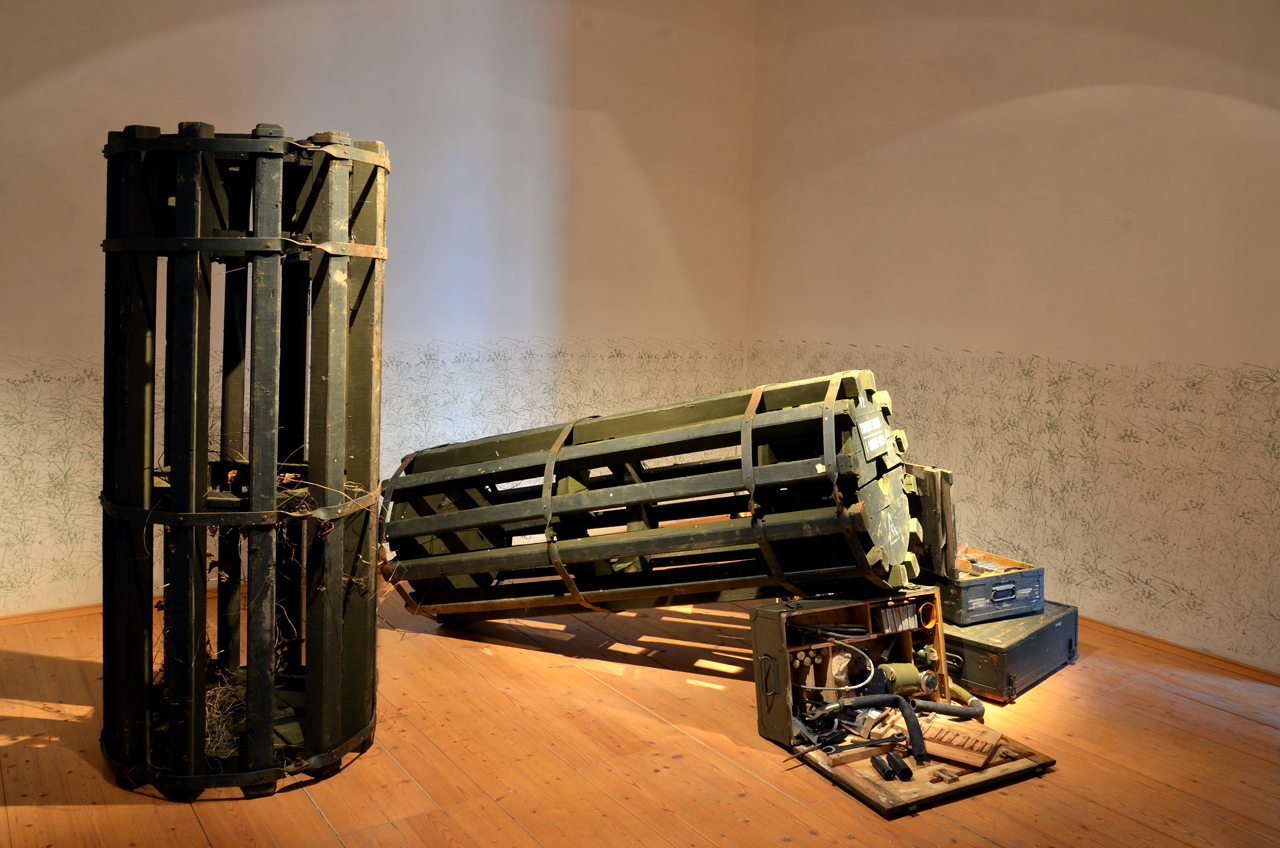
Intermediate Period, Gallery of the Central Bohemian Region in Kutná Hora, 2015

As a teacher at the University of West Bohemia, Jiří Beránek and his students created the large-scale project Extinct and Endangered Churches (2015), by which he returns to land art. In the region of the Plzeň diocese, where 122 churches have disappeared or are threatened, the students chose several sites for artistic interventions. Jiří Beránek aimed to resurrect a former pilgrimage site near the village of Srbice.

=== Drawings ===
Colour drawings are an integral part of Beránek's work. These are not drawing studies for sculptures or land art projects. They are often abstract in nature, or express the artist's reflection on abstract concepts, such as Smell, Touch (1989). Their counterparts are small abstract polychrome sculptures (Human Senses series, 1992). At another time it is a free association to the theme of landscape as a work of nature and a place intended for habitation. The shapes of the objects placed in the landscape are remotely reminiscent of some sculptural realisations.

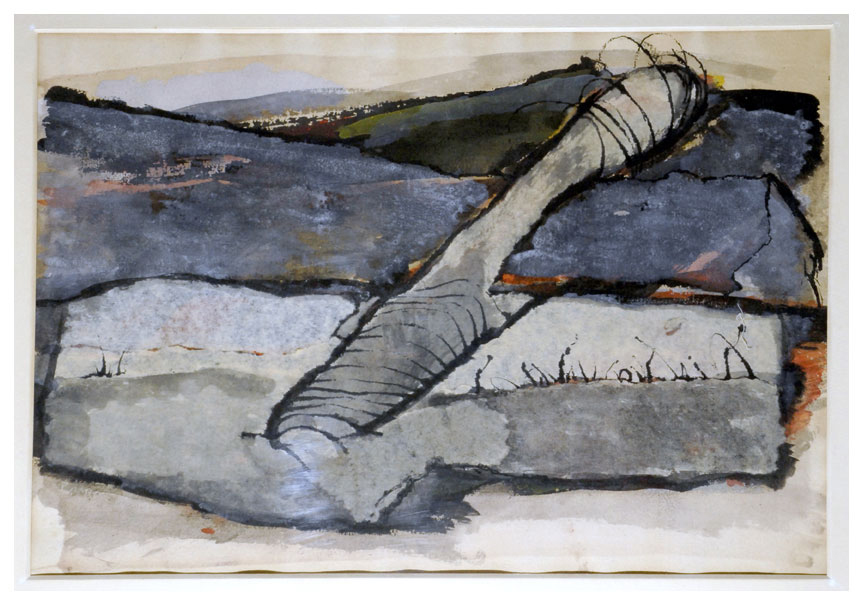
Jiří Beránek, drawing I

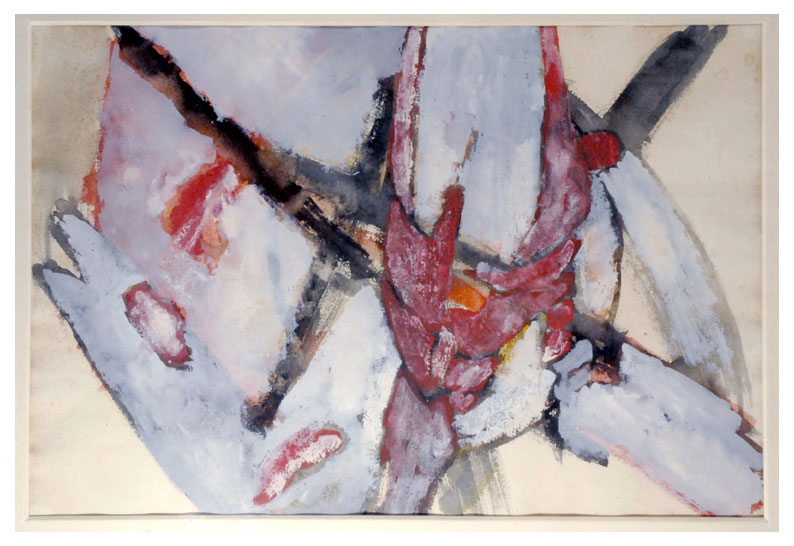
Jiří Beránek, drawing II

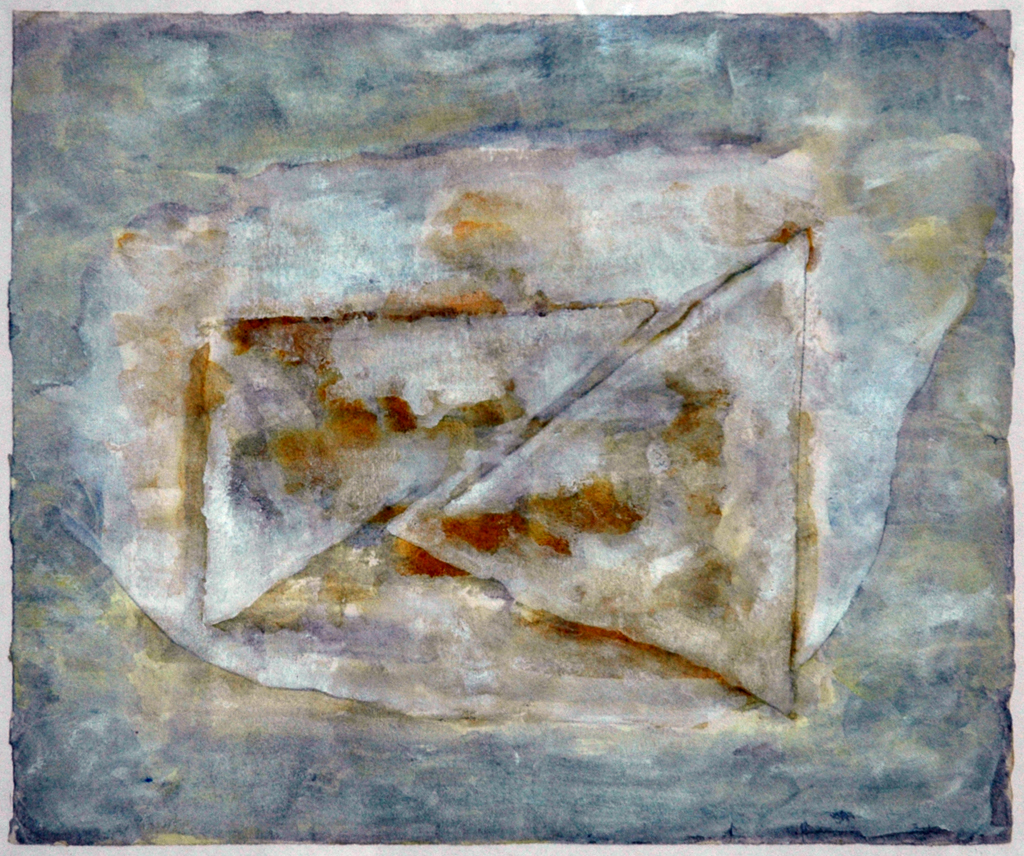
Jiří Beránek, drawing III

=== Landart ===
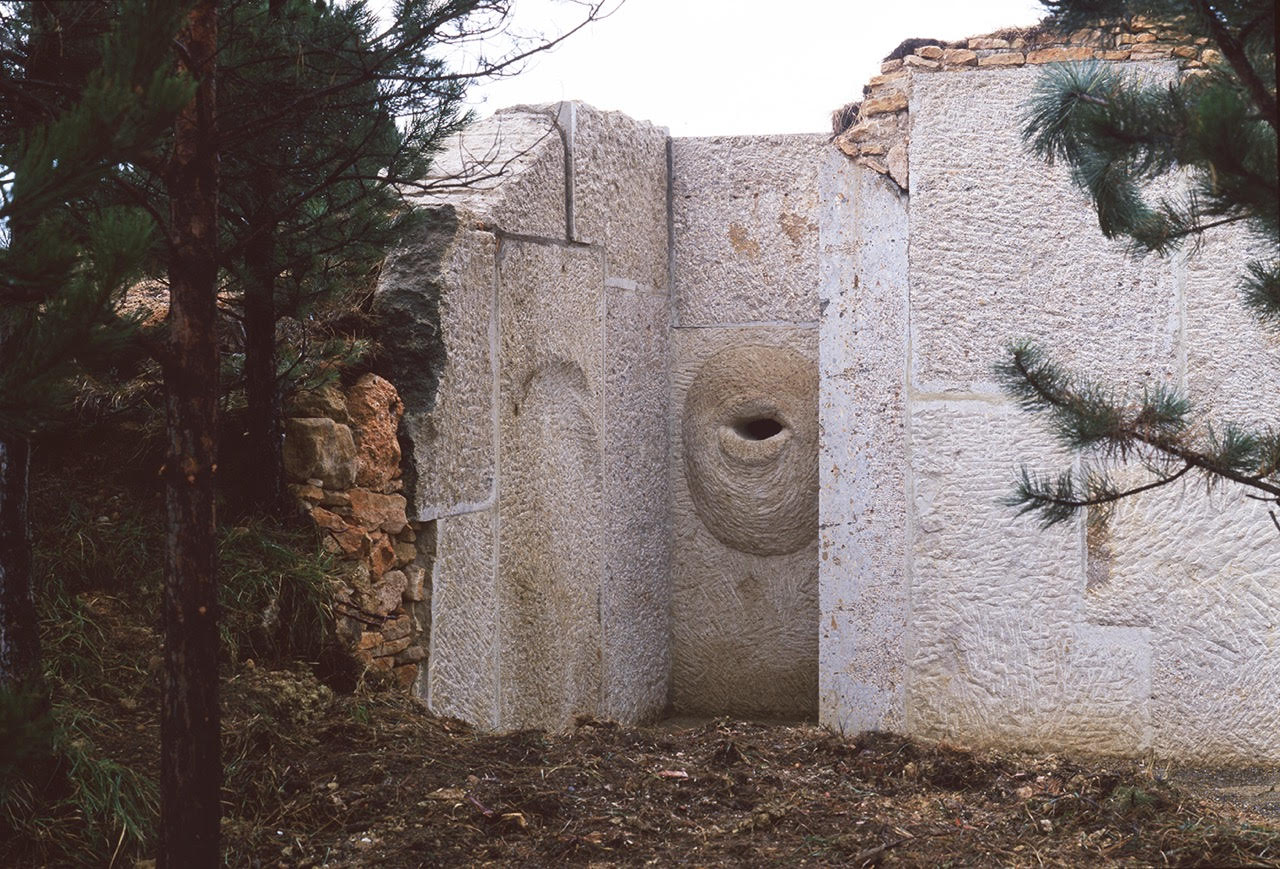
Jiří Beránek, Timelessness (1991)

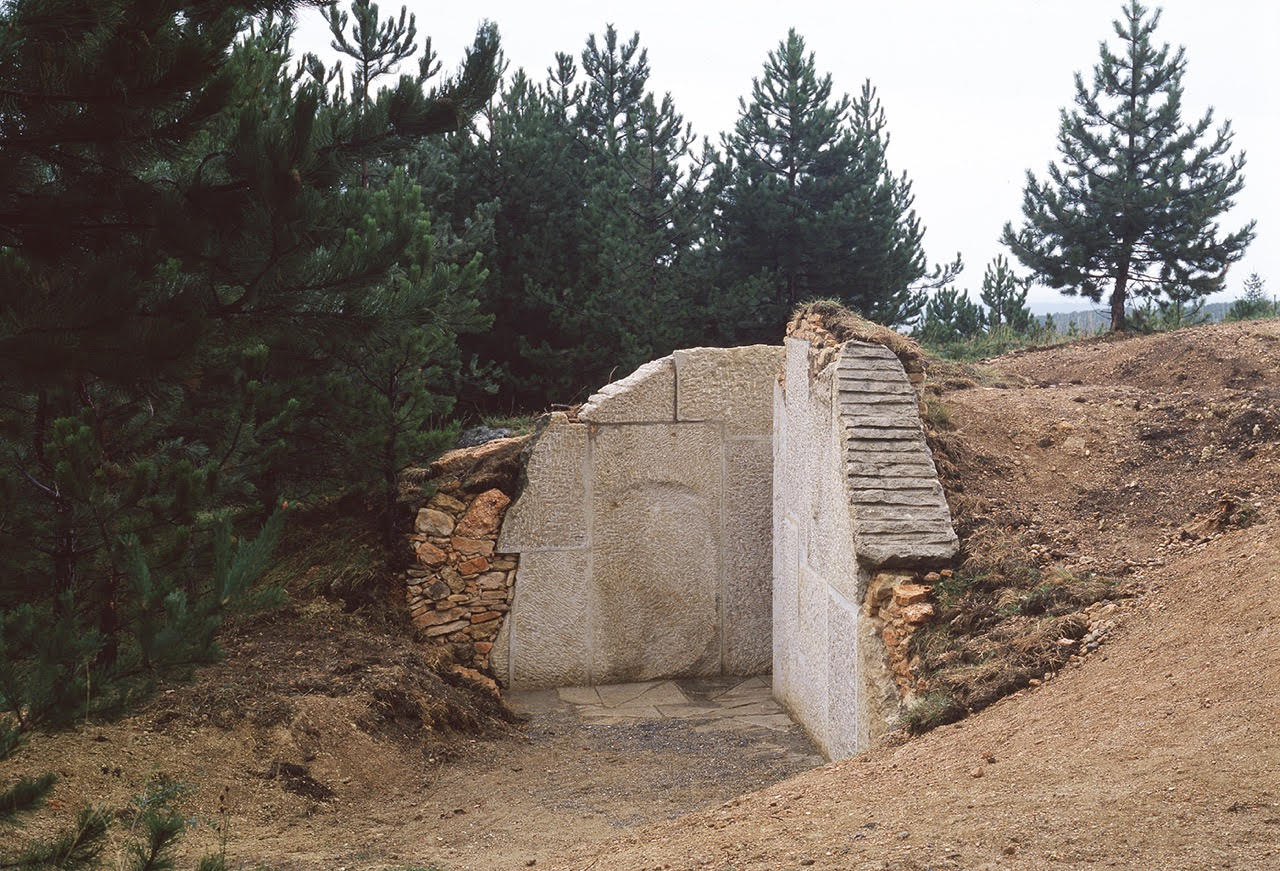
Jiří Beránek, Timelessness (1991)

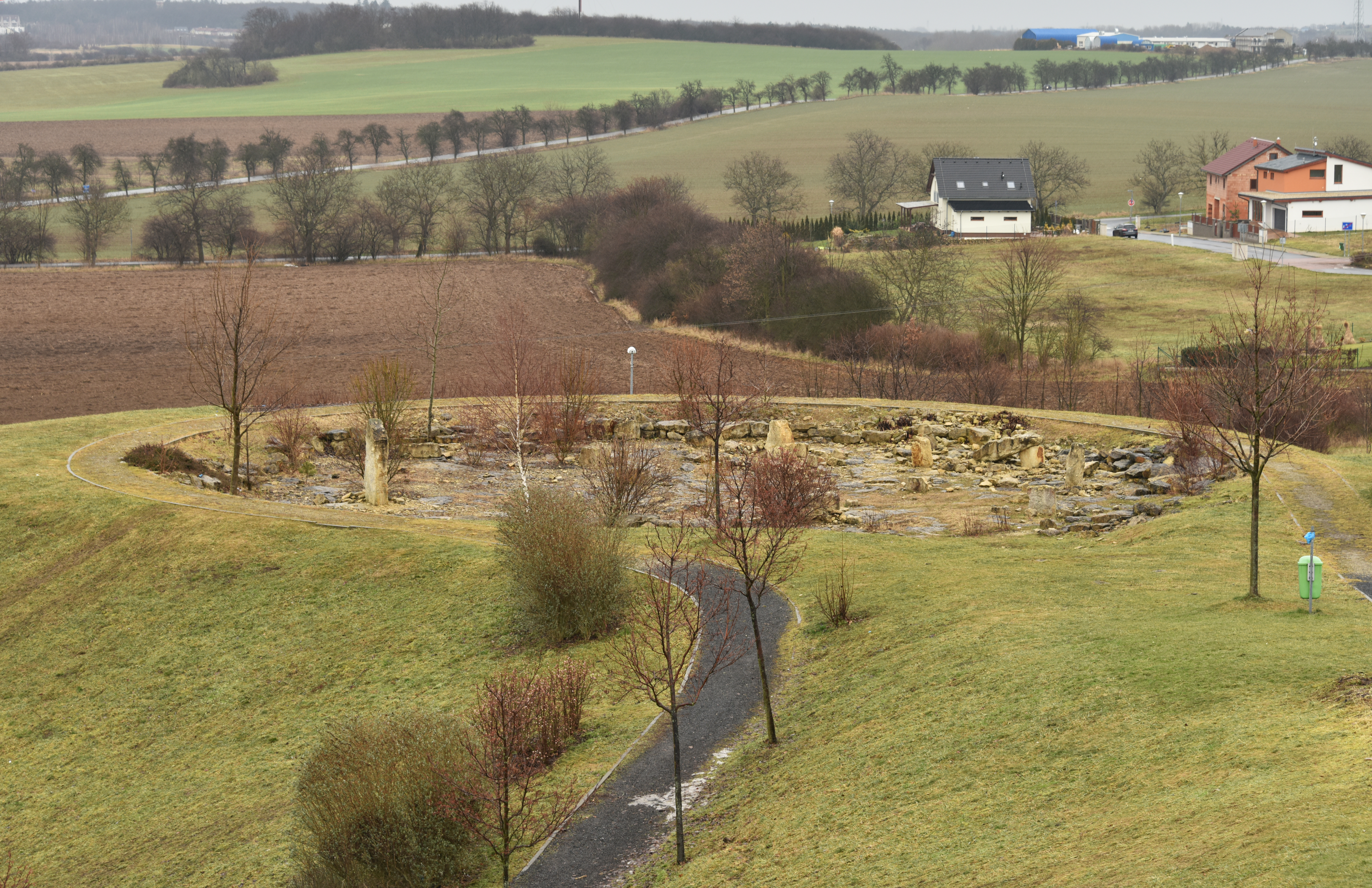
Jiří Beránek, Koloděje Amphitheatre

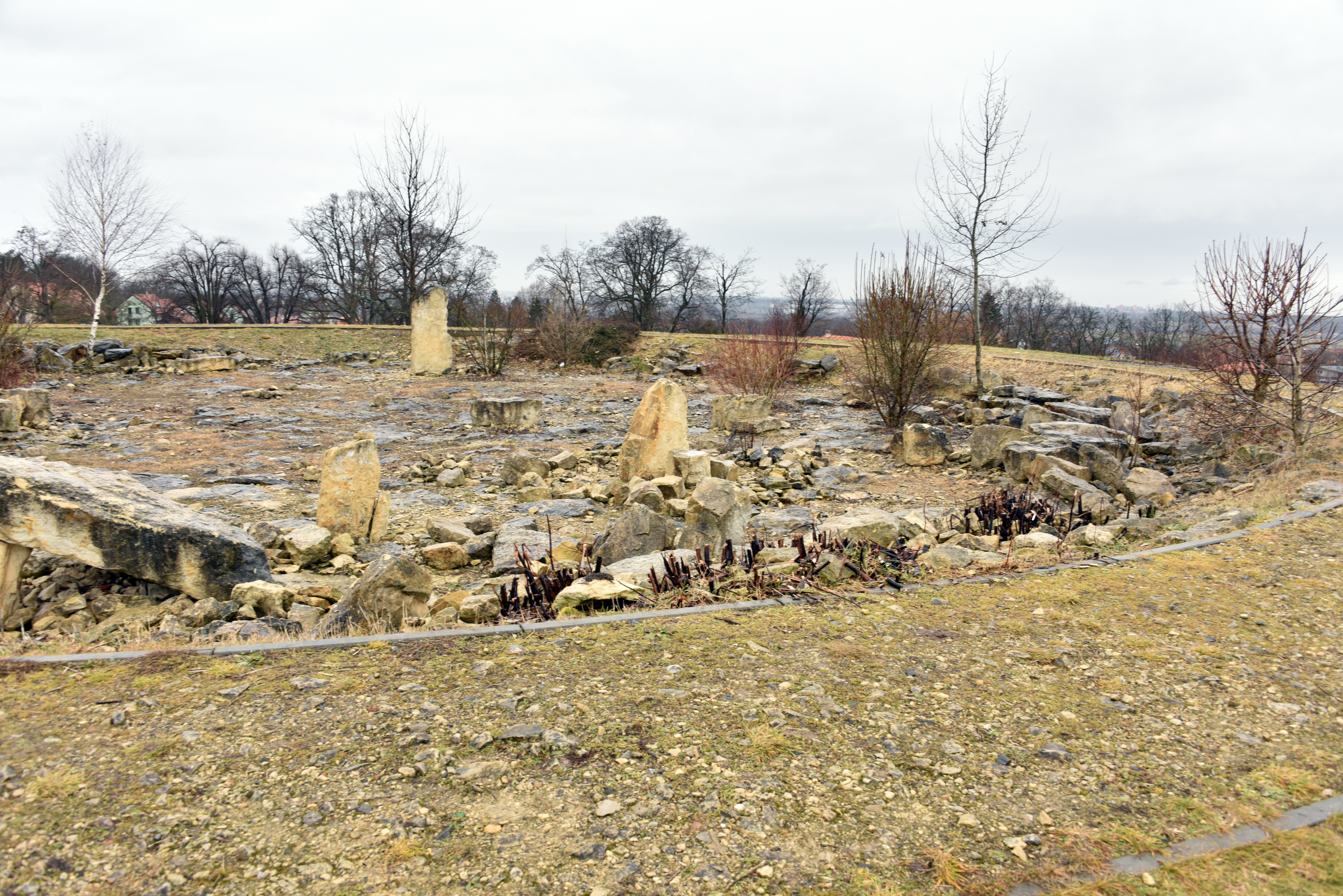
Jiří Beránek, Koloděje Amphitheatre (detail)

=== Realisations ===
- 1983 central space and staircase of Galerie H, Kostelec nad Černými lesy
- 1988 Coloured sculpture made of poles, in front of the church of St. Maurice in Hittfeld (Harburg district, Lower Saxony)
- 1988 Sacrificial table and ambon, gaize, Cathedral of the Holy Spirit in Hradec Králové
- 1990 Crucified (600 x 300 x 80 cm), Koloděje Cemetery
- 1991 Timelessness I (basalt), 3.6 × 8 x 90 m, II. International Sculpture Symposium Lemberk
- 1992 Not known from Where, art symposium Baroque and Today, Jesuit Church of the Annunciation of the Blessed Virgin Mary, Litoměřice
- 1994 Timelessness II (conglomerate), 340 x 700 x 800 cm, Bildhauersymposion Lindabrunn, Austria
- 2007 Amphitheatre, Koloděje
- 2009 Fountain, Prague-Koloděje district
- 2009 Unknown Saint, courtyard of Kampa Museum
- 2013 Wooden cladding, main building of Gallery Golf Hostivař
- 2015 Growing through, Srbice

=== Installations ===
- 1985 Court – Jiří Beránek: Sculptures, Vladimír Novák: Paintings, House No. 39, Kaufferovský, Kostelec nad Černými lesy
- 1990 Resurrection, La Défense, Paris, Emmaus Monastery, Prague
- 2010 The Sacrifice Place, Budovatelů Square, Sokolov

=== Representation in collections ===
- National Gallery in Prague
- Gallery of Modern Art in Hradec Králové
- Museum Kampa
- Gallery of the City of Prague
- Moravian Gallery in Brno
- Gallery of the Central Bohemian Region in Kutná Hora (GASK)
- Aleš Gallery of South Bohemia in Hluboká nad Vltavou
- Museum of Art Olomouc
- Gallery Klatovy / Klenová
- Museum of Local History in Šumperk
- private collections at home and abroad

=== Exhibitions ===
==== Solo ====
- 1979 Jiří Beránek: Sculptures, Museum of National History, Šumperk
- 1979 Jiří Beránek: Sculptures, Theatre in Nerudovka, Prague
- 1983 Realization '83, Jiří Beránek: Court (Space and Drawings), Gallery H, Kostelec nad Černými lesy
- 1985 Jiří Beránek, Gallery Opatov, Prague
- 1988 Jiří Beránek: Drawings, Opatov Gallery, Prague
- 1990 Jiří Beránek, Resurrection, La Défense, Paris, (1993–94, Emmaus Monastery)
- 1992 Jiří Beránek: Drawings and Small Sculptures, Litera Gallery, Prague
- 1992 Jiří Beránek: Drawings, Gema Gallery, Prague
- 1993 Jiří Beránek: Early paintings, objects and sculptures, Gallery '60/'70, Prague
- 1993 Jiří Beránek: Tilting, Via Art Gallery, Prague
- 1994 Jiří Beránek: The Beam in Your Eye (9th exhibition in the Big Theme series), Galerie Litera, Prague
- 1994/1995 Jiří Beránek, Gema Gallery, Prague
- 1995 Jiří Beránek, Karlovy Vary Art Gallery, Karlovy Vary
- 1996 Jiří Beránek: Sculptures, Gallery MK, Rožnov pod Radhoštěm
- 1997 Jiří Beránek, Castle and Chateau, Jindřichův Hradec
- 1997 Jiří Beránek; Sculptures and Drawings, Gema Gallery, House of Two Wild Men, Prague
- 1997/1998 Jiří Beránek: Blind Dorm, Via Art Gallery, Prague
- 1998 Jiří Beránek: The Twilight of Memory, Queen Anne's Summer Palace (Belveder), Prague
- 1998/1999 Jiří Beránek, Gema Gallery, Prague
- 1999 Jiří Beránek: Bending, Klatovy / Klenová Gallery, former military premises in Janovice nad Úhlavou
- 2000 Jiří Beránek: From the suitcase, Gambit Gallery, Prague
- 2000 Jiří Beránek: Drink for the Drowning, Litera Gallery, Prague
- 2003 Jiří Beránek, Museum Kampa, Prague
- 2005 Jiří Beránek: Three Sisters, Galerie U prstenu, Prague
- 2006 Jiří Beránek: Small Sculpture, Magna Gallery, Ostrava
- 2006 Jiří Beránek: The Power of Silence, ČKD Dukla Industrial Hall, Prague
- 2007 Jiří Beránek: Shards, Gallery of Modern Art in Hradec Králové
- 2009 Jiří Beránek: The Face Behind the Window, University Gallery, Plzeň
- 2012 Jiří Beránek: The Power of Silence, Světovar Industrial Space, Plzeň
- 2014 Jiří Beránek: Before Nightfall, Václav Chad Gallery, Zlín
- 2015 Jiří Beránek: The Intermediate Period, Gallery of the Central Bohemian Region in Kutná Hora (GASK)
- 2017 Jiří Beránek: Like migratory birds, Gallery of the Central Bohemian Region in Kutná Hora (GASK)
- 2017 Jiří Beránek: Then, Navrátil Gallery Prague
- 2020 Tomáš Švéda: paintings, Jiří Beránek: objects, Castle in Jindřichův Hradec

==== Collective (selection until 1989) ====
- 1973 Sculpture Meeting, Vojanovy sady Prague
- 1977 Sculpture Symposium Hukvaldy
- 1978 Confrontation, Institute of Microbiology, Czech Academy of Sciences, Prague
- 1980 Space of Man, Dobříš Cultural Centre
- 1982 Meeting, Prague-Stromovka
- 1983 Paintings and Sculptures, OKD Gong Prague 9 (with Magdalena Jetelová)
- 1988 12/15, Late But Still, Koloděje Riding School
- 1988 Forum 88, Prague Holešovice Market Hall
- 1988 12/15 One Older, One Younger, Lidový dům Vysočany, Prague
- 1989 Middle Age, House at the Stone Bell, GHMP, OGVU Gottwaldov (Zlín)
- An overview of joint exhibitions is presented in detail by abART – Jiří Beránek: Exhibitions

== Sources ==
=== Monographs ===
- Jiří Beránek, Courtyard (Space and Drawings), plates, 23 loose sheets, Gallery H, Kostelec nad Černými lesy 1983
- Jiří Beránek, text by Alena Potůčková, 64 p., Czech Museum of Fine Arts in Prague 1994, ISBN 80-7056-026-6
- Jiří Beránek, text by Ivan Neumann, 84 p., Galerie Gema Prague 1997, ISBN 80-86087-01-8
- Jiří Beránek: Přítmí paměti, 1998, text by Jiří Beránek, Josef Hlaváček, 52 p., Galerie Gema, Prague 1998, ISBN 80-86087-12-3
- Atelier of Professor Jiří Beránek. Specific Landart, Beránek J et al., 191 p., University of West Bohemia, Plzeň 2015, ISBN 978-80-261-0561-9
- Silvie Stanická (ed.), Jiří Beránek, Tomas Bata University in Zlín 2016, ISBN 978-80-7454-556-6

=== Catalogues ===
- Jiří Beránek: Sculptures, 1979, cat. 4 p., Homeland Museum, Šumperk
- Jiří Beránek, 1979, Prahl R, cat. 12 p., Theatre in Nerudovka, Prague
- Jiří Beránek, 1985, Prahl R, two sheets, Cultural Centre Opatov, Prague
- Jiří Beránek, 1988, Prahl R, double sheet, Cultural Centre Opatov, Prague
- 12/15, Late But Still, published by the Department of Education and Culture Prague 9 in 1988
- 12/15 Czech Globe, published by the Ministry of Culture of the Czech Republic, Prague 1991
- Jiří Beránek: Drawings and small sculptures, 1992, Neumann I, cat. 4 p., Litera Gallery, Prague
- Jiří Beránek: Early paintings, objects and sculptures, 1993, cat. 6 p., '60/'70 Gallery, Prague
- Jiří Beránek, Tomáš Švéda: Triple House, text by Ivan Neumann, cat. 4 p., Emmaus Monastery Prague 1993/1994
- Jiří Beránek: The Beam in Your Eye (9th exhibition from the cycle The Big Theme), 1994, introduction by Petr Pavlík, cat. 4 p., Litera Gallery, Prague
- Jiří Beránek: From the Suitcase, 2000, Hlaváček J, cat. 4 p., Gambit Gallery, Prague
- Jiří Beránek, 2006, Neumann I, cat. 2 p., Magna Gallery, Ostrava
- Jiří Beránek: Shards, 2007, Neumann I, cat. 8 p., Gallery of Modern Art in Hradec Králové
- Jiří Beránek: Before Nightfall, 2014, cat. 8 p., Zlínský zámek, o.p.s., Zlín

=== Other ===
- Pachmanová M, Pražanová M (eds.), Vysoká škola uměleckoprůmyslová v Praze / Academy of Arts, Architecture and Design in Prague 1885–2005, 340 p., GHMP, VŠUP Praha 2005, ISBN 80-86863-09-3
