= Borkovice =

- Municipality
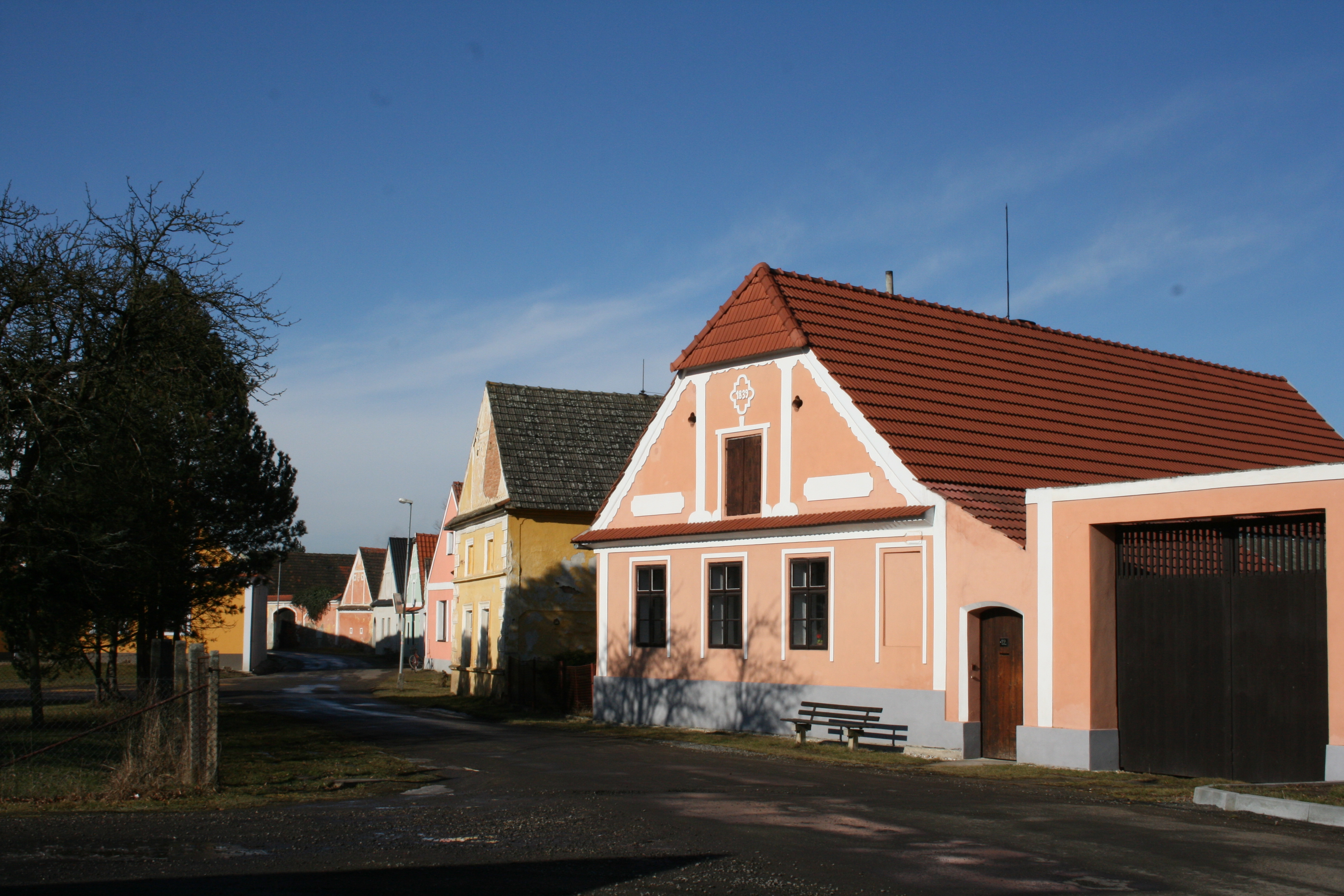
- Houses in the Folk Baroque style

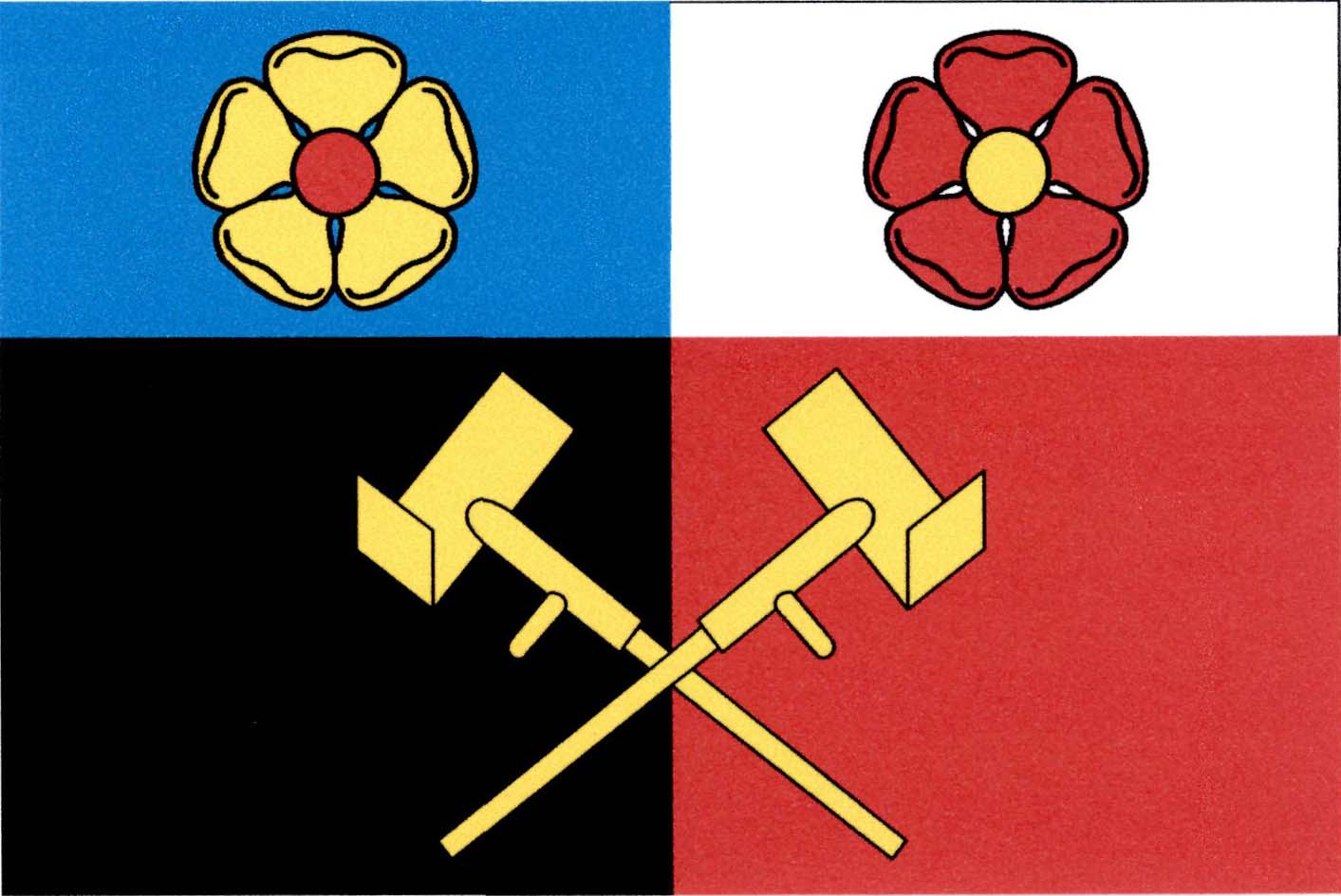
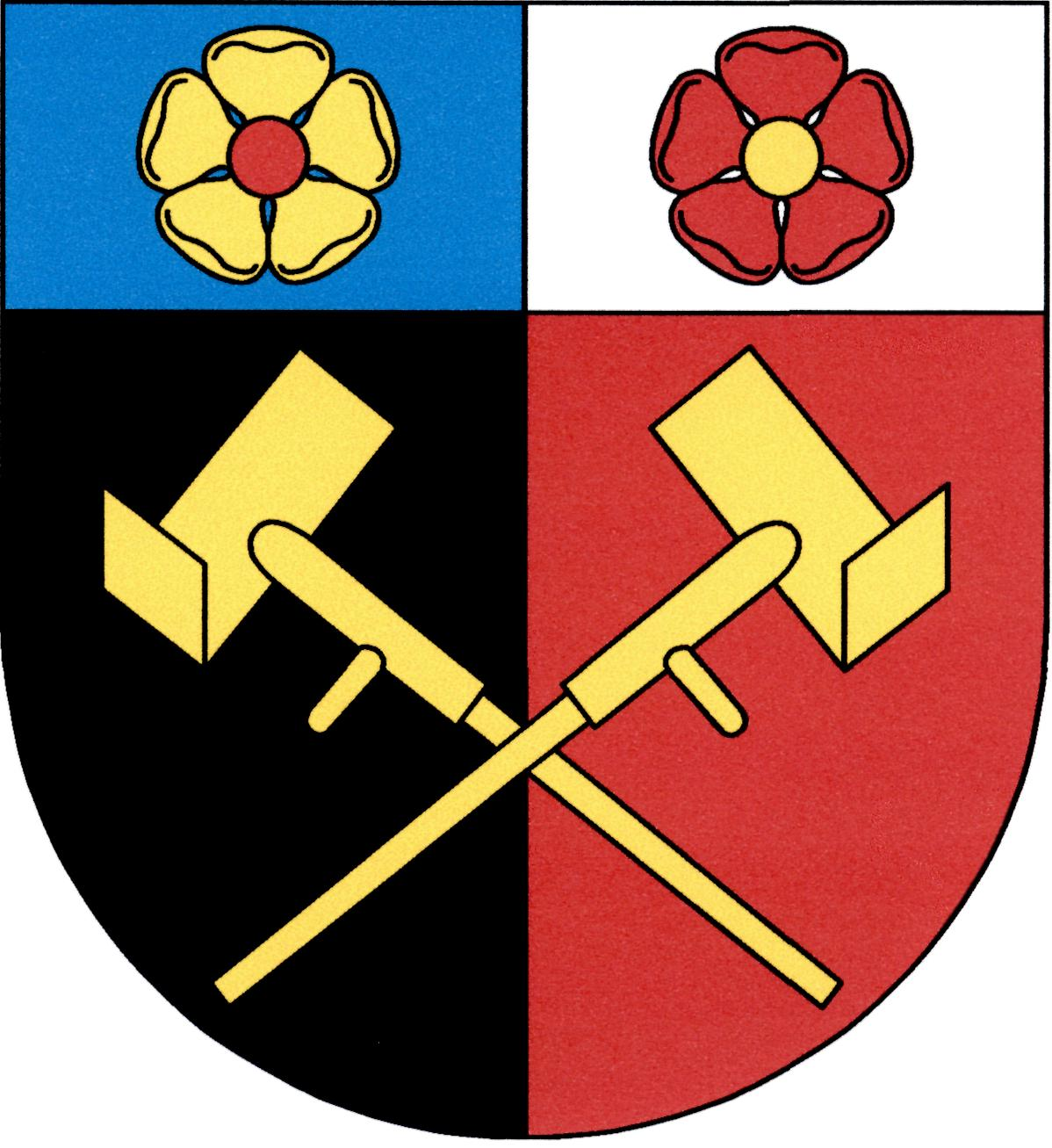
- Flag Coat of arms

- Location in the Czech Republic
- Coordinates: 49°12′29″N 14°38′36″E
- Country: Czech Republic
- Region: South Bohemian
- District: Tábor
- First mentioned: 1354

Area
  - Total: 15.83 km^{2} (6.11 sq mi)
- Elevation: 416 m (1,365 ft)

Population (2026-01-01)
  - Total: 250
  - Density: 16/km^{2} (41/sq mi)
- Time zone: UTC+1 (CET)
  - Summer (DST): UTC+2 (CEST)
- Postal code: 391 81
- Website: www.borkovice.cz

Borkovice is a municipality and village in Tábor District in the South Bohemian Region of the Czech Republic. It has about 300 inhabitants.

Borkovice lies approximately 22 kilometres (14 mi) south of Tábor, 30 km (19 mi) north-east of České Budějovice, and 98 km (61 mi) south of Prague.

== Demographics ==
Historical population
Year	Pop.	±%
1869	381	—
1880	353	−7.3%
1890	390	+10.5%
1900	368	−5.6%
1910	402	+9.2%
1921	422	+5.0%
1930	402	−4.7%
1950	350	−12.9%
1961	353	+0.9%
1970	355	+0.6%
1980	301	−15.2%
1991	258	−14.3%
2001	229	−11.2%
2011	232	+1.3%
2021	229	−1.3%
Source: Censuses

== Notable people ==
- Jiří Beránek (1945–2021), sculptor and painter
