= Koloděje =

Koloděje Koloděje
- Municipal District of Prague; Cadastral Area of Prague
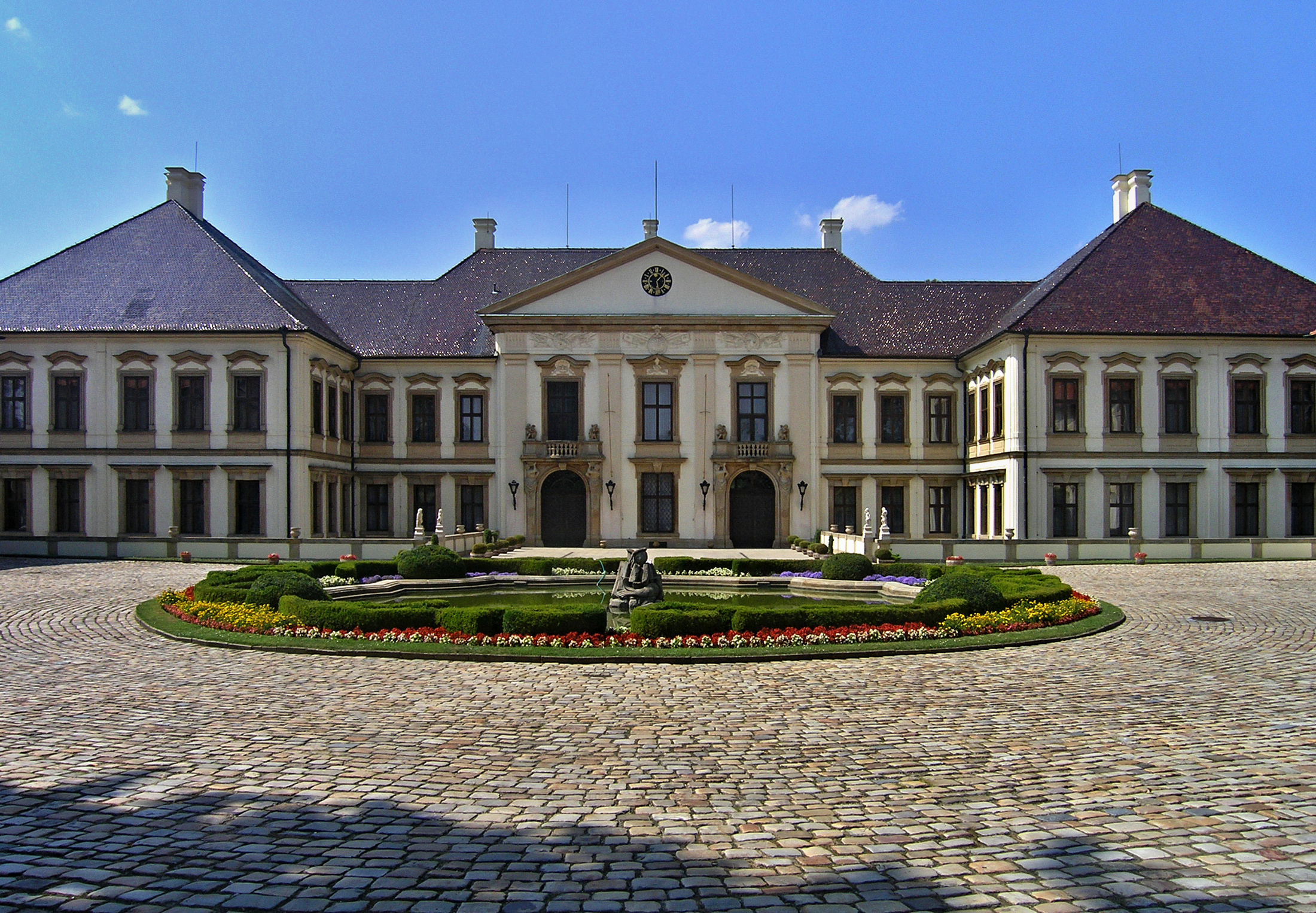
- chateau in Koloděje

- Flag Coat of arms

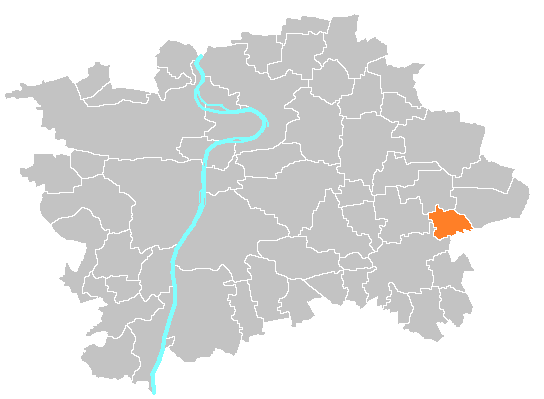
- Location of Kolodějein Prague
- Coordinates: 50°3′47″N 14°38′27″E
- Country: Czech Republic
- Region: Prague
- District: Prague 21

Government
  - Mayor: Angela Morávková

Area
  - Total: 3.74 km^{2} (1.44 sq mi)

Population (2021)
  - Total: 1,626
  - Density: 435/km^{2} (1,130/sq mi)
- Time zone: UTC+1 (CET)
  - Summer (DST): UTC+2 (CEST)
- Postal code: 190 16
- Website: http://www.praha-kolodeje.cz

Koloděje is a municipal district (městská část) and cadastral area (katastrální území) in Prague. It is located in the eastern part of the city. As of 2021, there were 1,626 inhabitants living in Koloděje.

The first written record of Koloděje is from the 13th century. The village became part of Prague in 1974.

== Demographics ==
Historical population
Year	Pop.	±%
1869	495	—
1880	450	−9.1%
1890	487	+8.2%
1900	481	−1.2%
1910	495	+2.9%
1921	485	−2.0%
1930	730	+50.5%
1950	651	−10.8%
1961	748	+14.9%
1970	711	−4.9%
1980	681	−4.2%
1991	628	−7.8%
2001	832	+32.5%
2011	1,431	+72.0%
2021	1,626	+13.6%
Source: Censuses
