= Entropia =

Entropia may mean:

- Entropy a scientific concept that is most commonly associated with a state of disorder, randomness, or uncertainty.
- Entropia Universe (formerly known as Project Entropia), a popular MMORPG-style online virtual universe.
- Entropia, Inc. (company), a defunct company that produced commercial distributed computing software.
- Entropia (album), a music album by the Swedish progressive metal band, Pain of Salvation.
- Entropa, a satirical art installation depicting member countries of the European Union
