= Lukáš Rais =

Czech sculptor

acad. sculptor Lukáš Rais
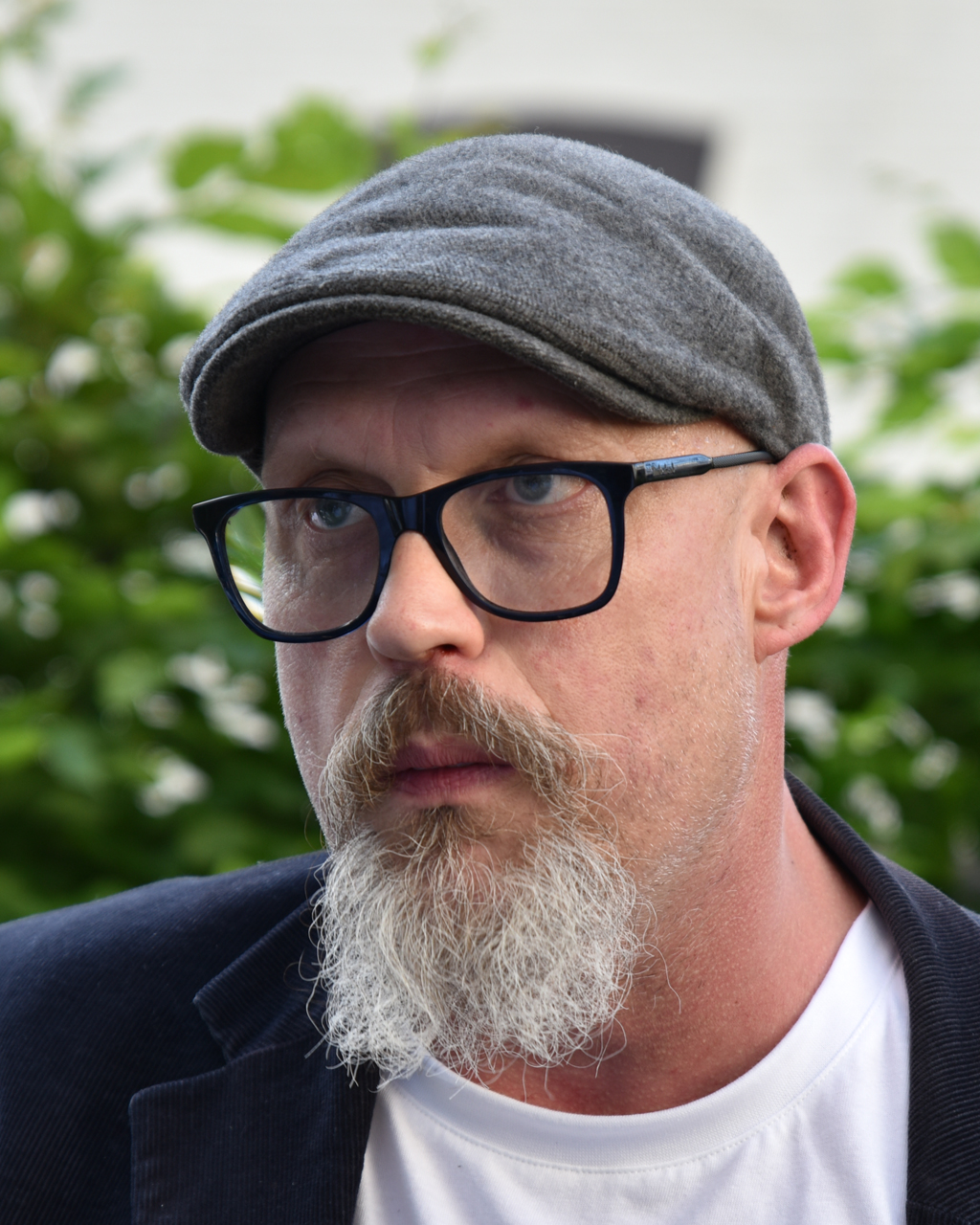
- Rais in 2024
- Born: 15 May 1975 (age 51); Sokolov, Czechoslovakia
- Education: Academy of Arts, Architecture and Design in Prague
- Known for: sculptor
- Awards: Czech Grand Design (nomination in 2009, 2013)
- Website: www.lukasrais.com

Lukáš Rais (born 15 May 1975) is Czech sculptor, designer, creator of monumental spatial installations and theatre artist.

== Life ==
Rais was born in Sokolov on 15 May 1975. He attended the Vocational High School in Prague from 1989 to 1992, majoring in measurement and control technology, and then completed a post-secondary program and obtained high school diploma in electrical engineering (motors) in 1995. Until 2005, he worked in various professions. He created his first sculptures from pipes while working as a construction foreman, when he had the opportunity to use dismantled water supply risers. In 2000, while traveling through Mexico, he decided to devote himself to art. At first, he considered studying ceramics and took drawing classes with Boris Jirků and learned modeling in a ceramics workshop led by Jiří Beránek. Starting in 2005, he studied at the Academy of Arts, Architecture and Design in Prague (VŠUP) in the studio of Prof. Jiří Beránek and also attended the studios of Prof. Kurt Gebauer and Krištof Kintera.

He created his first large-scale sculpture made of bent metal tubes, aptly titled “The Path of the Tube,” during his first year of study at the VŠUP. His final project in 2006 - the metal-tube sculpture “Tree” has received the Rector's Award from the VŠUP. The sculpture stands in the courtyard of the Clementinum. He graduated in 2010, by when he had already held several exhibitions. In 2006, 2007, and 2008, he received student awards of the Sculpture Studio at the VŠUP. His sculptures "Llamas", installed in the Prague City Botanical Garden in Troja were created in 2007 during his studies at VŠUP.

In 2009, he was nominated for the Czech Grand Design Award as part of Designblok; in 2013, he was nominated in the "Discovery of the Year" category at the Czech Grand Design competition for his collection of decorative heating sculptures. In a short period of time, he managed to establish an outstanding reputation and a unique position for himself as a sculptor.

=== Awards ===
- 2006 Rector's Award, Academy of Arts, Architecture and Design in Prague

== Work ==
Rais states that Jiří Beránek had the greatest influence on his work. Beránek gave him the self-confidence he needed and supported him in his own original view on the sculpture. Lukáš Rais's works are characterized as "industrial poetics". In creating them, he draws on his previous education in electrical engineering, mechanics, and the technological principles used in industry. Rais metal sculpture construction is based on math, geometry and physic rules. The actual construction of a sculpture is preceded by a sketch where he calculates precise cutting angles to prevent internal stress, occurring during changes in external temperature after the individual parts have been welded together.

He most often uses black wrought iron or high-grade stainless steel. The basic material from which he assembles his sculptures is industrially manufactured transition elbows. He purchases the material, which comes in various diameters, from abroad (Pakistan, China, the Netherlands, Norway, Finland, Romania, Italy, and Ukraine). He entrusts the construction of the sculptures at their final scale to his team, which includes a designer, a welder, a mechanic, and a specialist who handles the final surface finishing.

He leaves his iron sculptures in their natural color and anticipates oxidation when installing them outdoors. The aesthetic effect of a stainless steel sculpture, which reflects its surroundings and appears almost immaterial, is only fully realized upon its final installation. Lukáš Rais's largest project (and also the greatest work of its kind in architecture over the past 100 years) is a suspended relief made of iron and stainless steel in Barrandov, which is 17 meters high and 6 meters wide. During installation, it was necessary to account for the metal's thermal expansion of up to 9 mm; therefore, the suspension is a sliding mechanism, and the transverse joints are made of flexible material to compensate for the differing thermal expansion rates of iron and stainless steel.

For an exhibition titled "Ride" at the EPO 1 Gallery in Trutnov-Poříčí, he created a multi-figure sculpture of cyclists titled "In the Breakaway," which depicts both the winner and a mass crash.

In addition to his independent artistic work, Lukáš Rais is also involved in industrial design. He has designed a modular chair system (the Hellmut system) and a series of wall-mounted reliefs that serve as radiators. His small-scale free works of art can be found in the interiors of Restaurant No. 49, Prague (2005), the W3S Club, Prague (2005), Stavokontrol s.r.o., Prague (2008), the Mazur and Pšeničný dental clinic, Prague (2010), Potrubí Praha a.s., Prague (2010–11), and in a number of private collections.

Since 2010, he has been working closely with Akropolis Palace on the interactive projects Traffic Dance and Traffic Drums. He is the creator of the project's visual design and collaborates with the movement-theater group ‘'Spitfire Company’'. He is a founding member of Divadlo Cože? (lit. 'the "What?" theatre'), which has been performing regularly at Akropolis Palace since 2009, and the author of the play Posnídám později (I’ll Have Breakfast Later), in which he also performs. This entire theatrical-linguistic work, bordering on acting masochism, is based on a specific constraint — every word in the play begins with the letter P.

=== Sculptures in public space (selection) ===
- Tree, Clementinum, Prague (2006)
- Llamas, Prague City Botanical Garden (2007)
- Figure, Svinaře Castle (2009)
- Three Trees with lights (2017), Prague-Dolní Chabry
- Bank of fragrances, Prague City Botanical Garden (2012)
- Barrandien relief (2022)

== Gallery ==
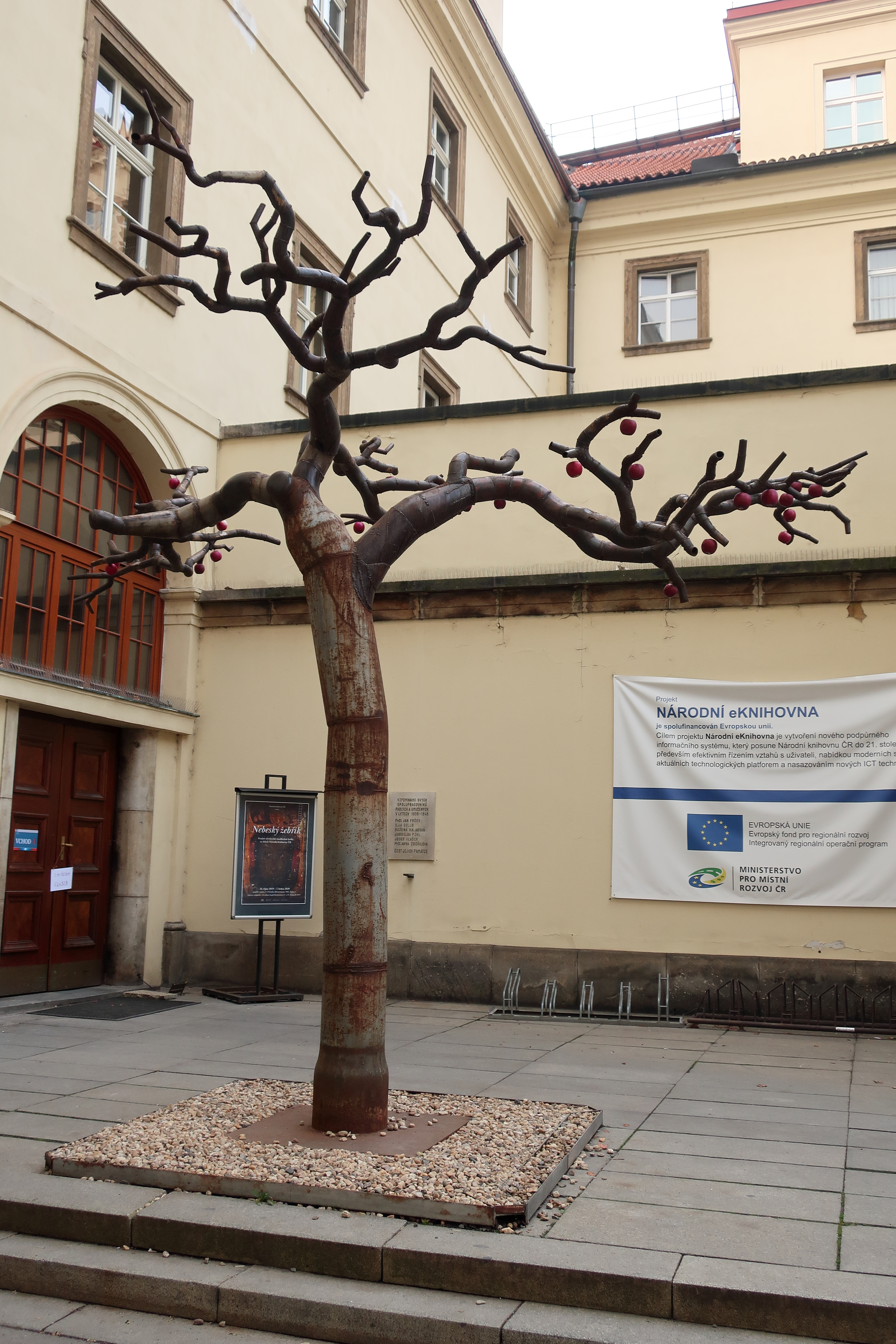
Tree (2006), Clementinum, Prague

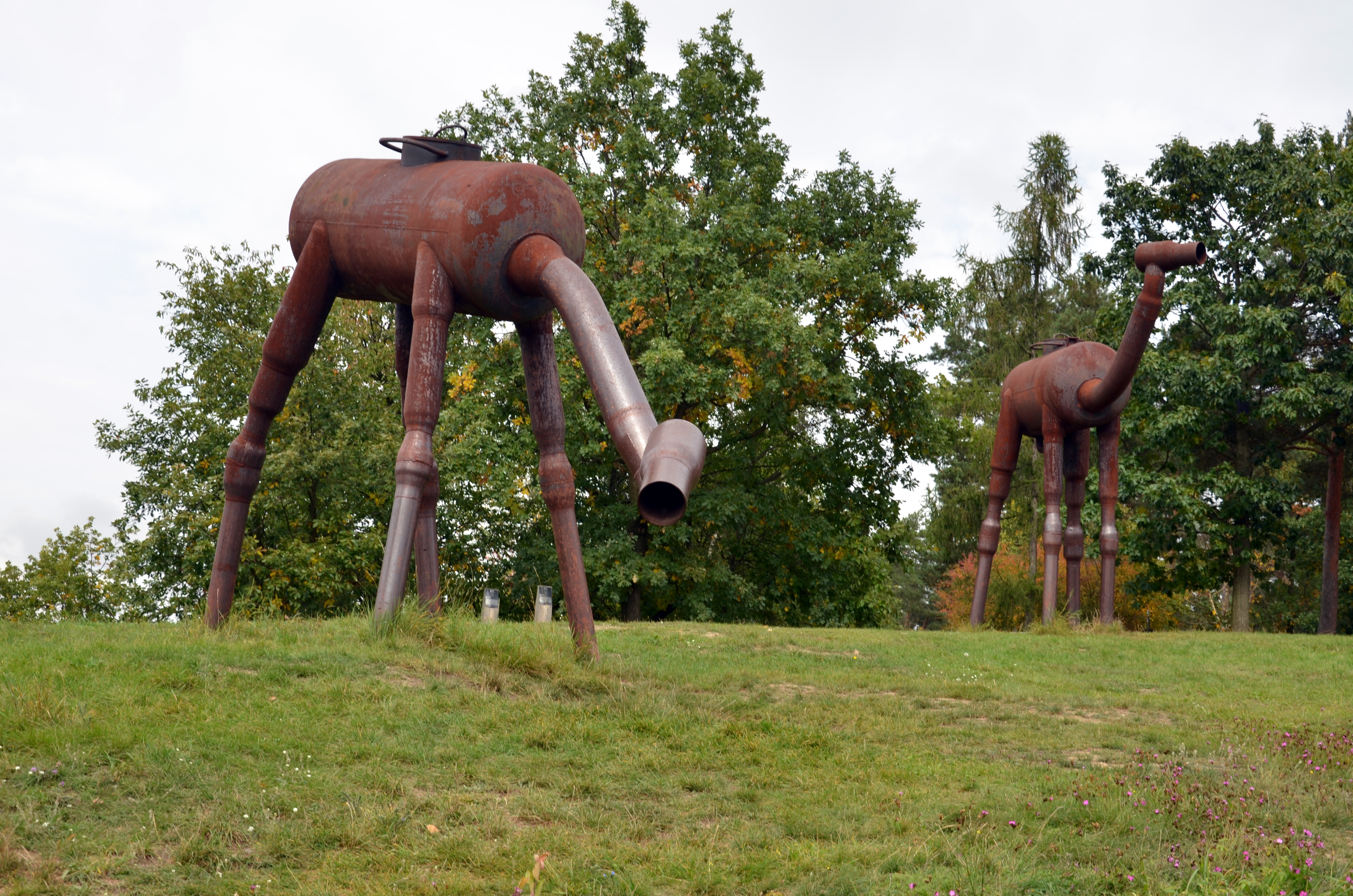
Llamas (2007), Prague Botanical Garden

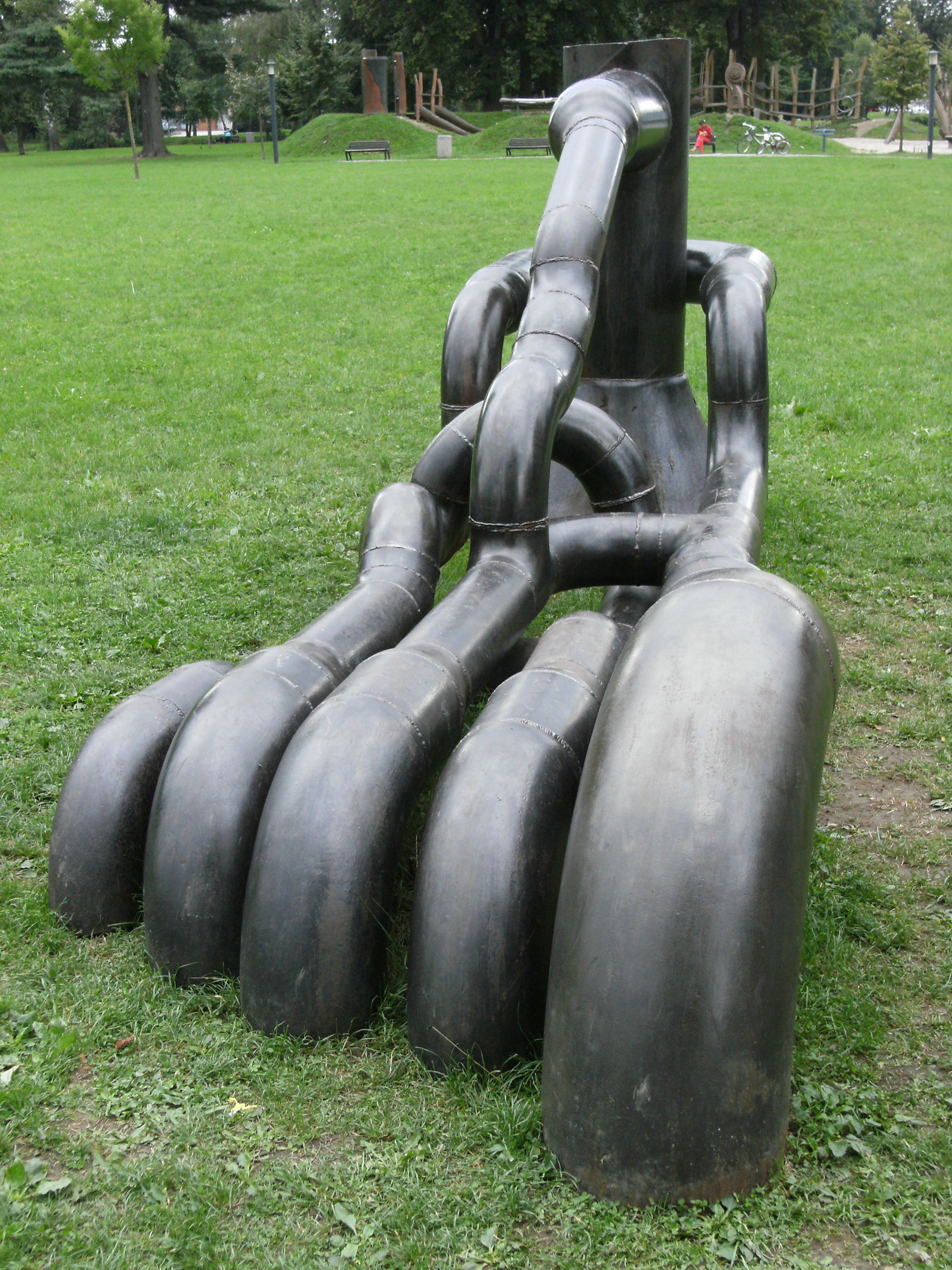
Lukáš Rais: Foot (2009)

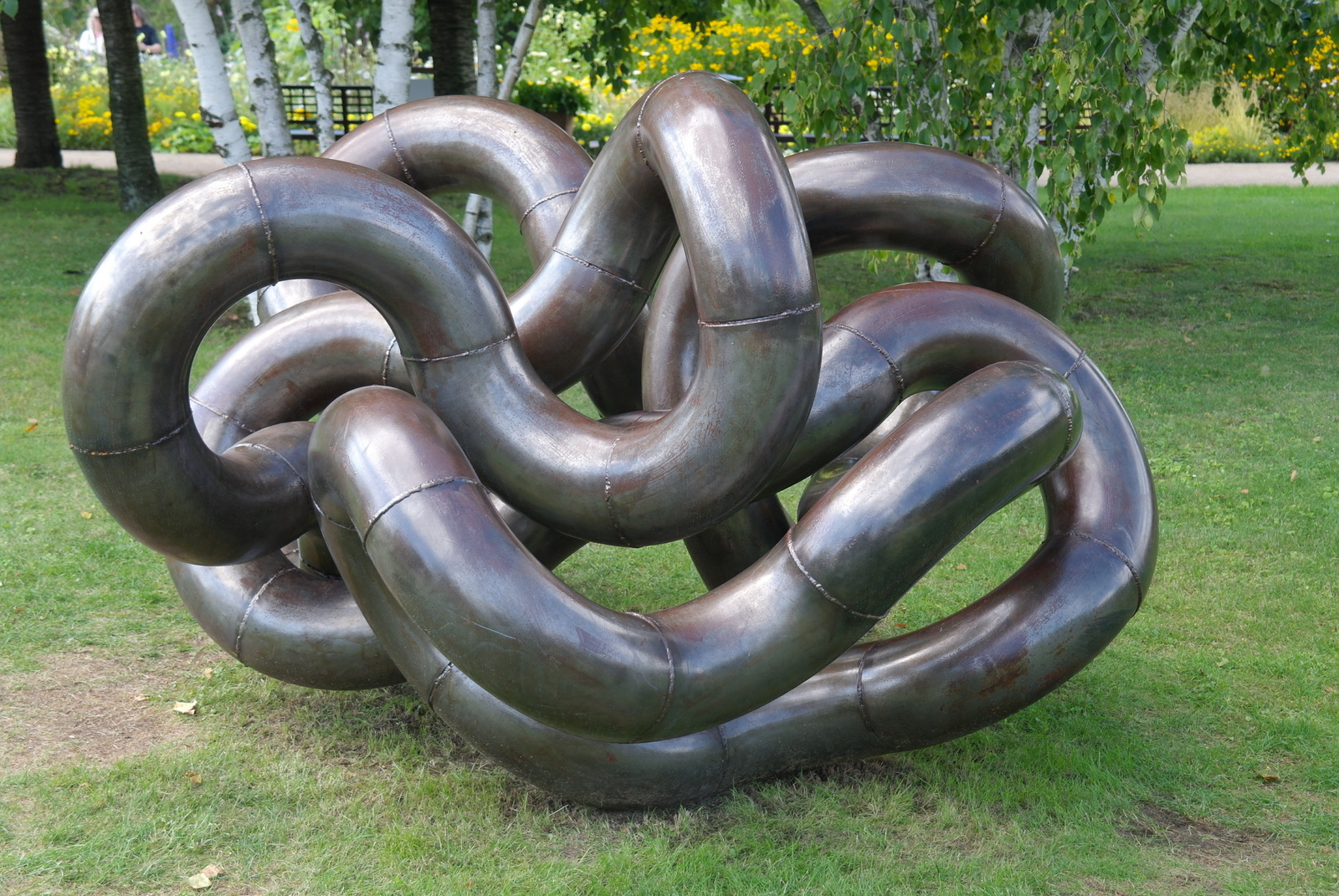
Irony (2012), Prague Botanical Garden

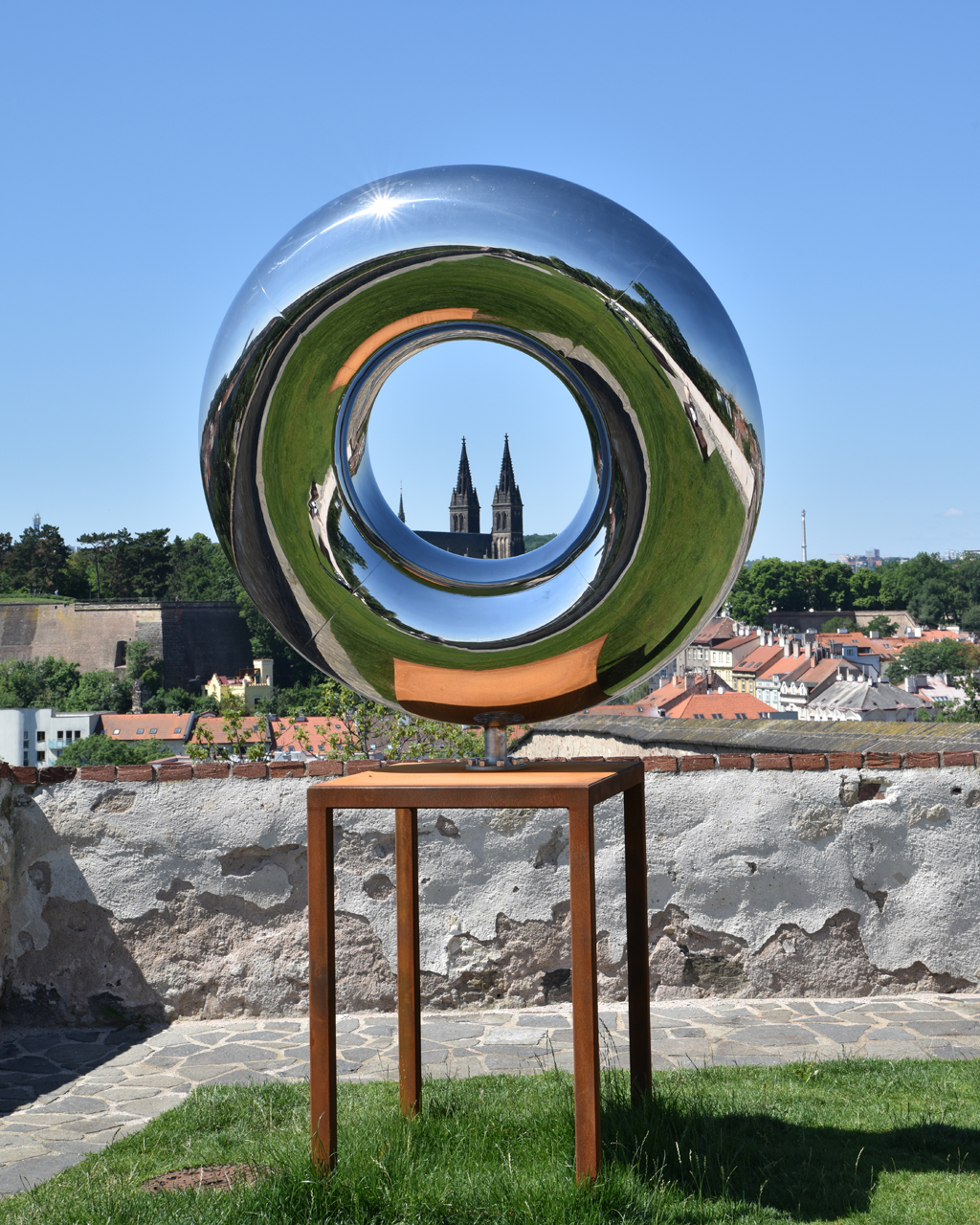
Anuloid (2013)

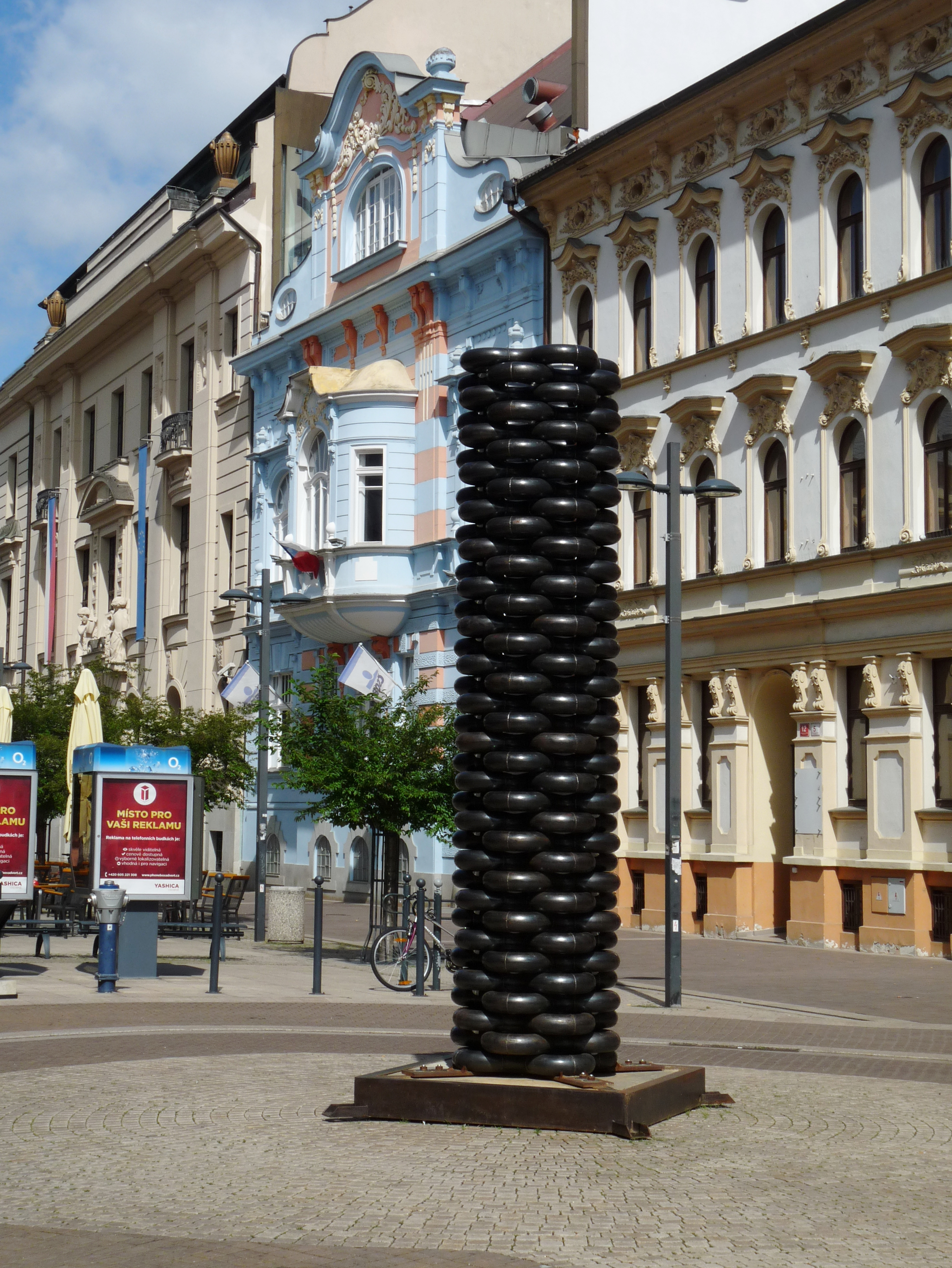
Stele (2016)

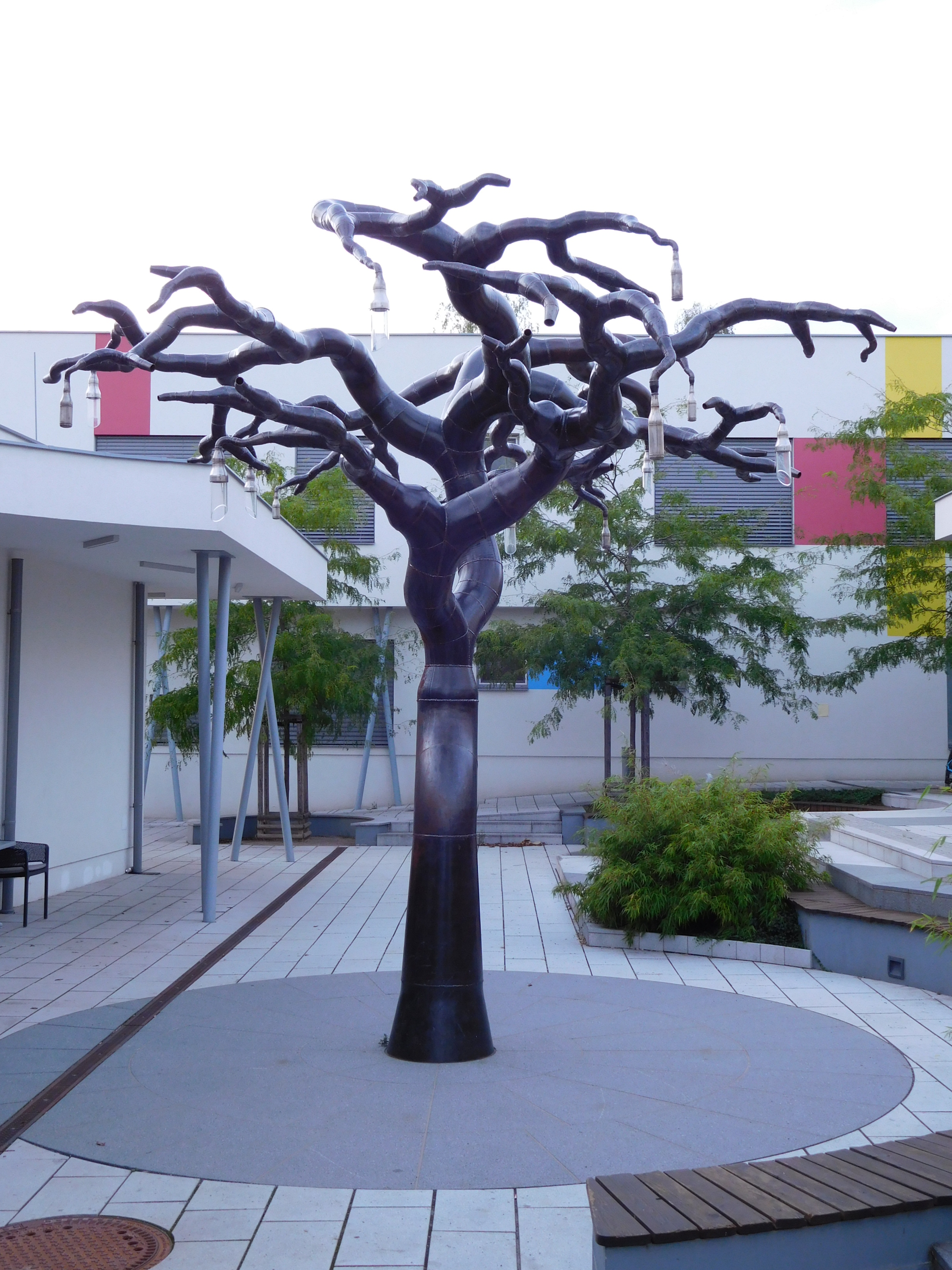
Tree III (2017), Prague-Dolni Chabry

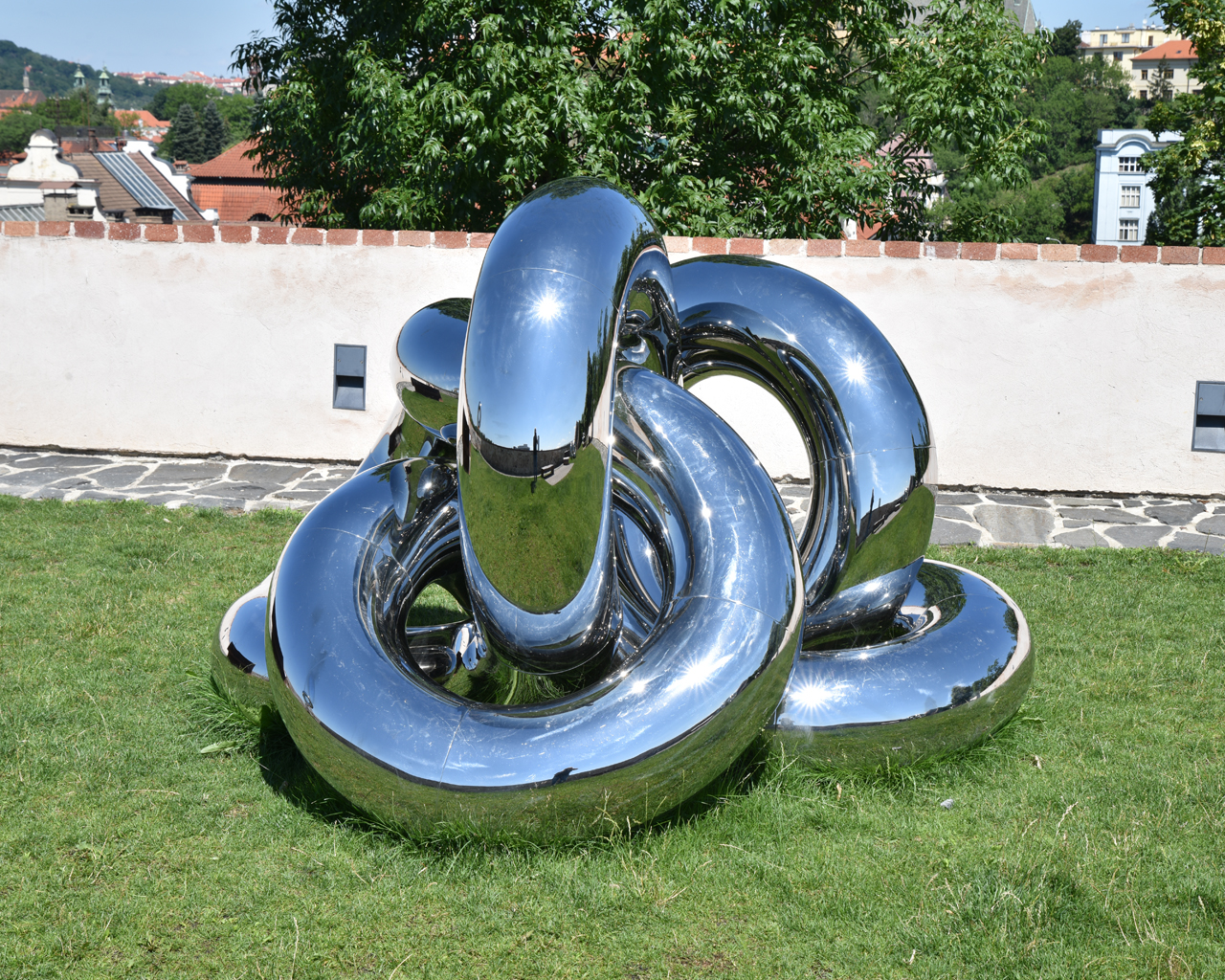
Archimedon II (2018)

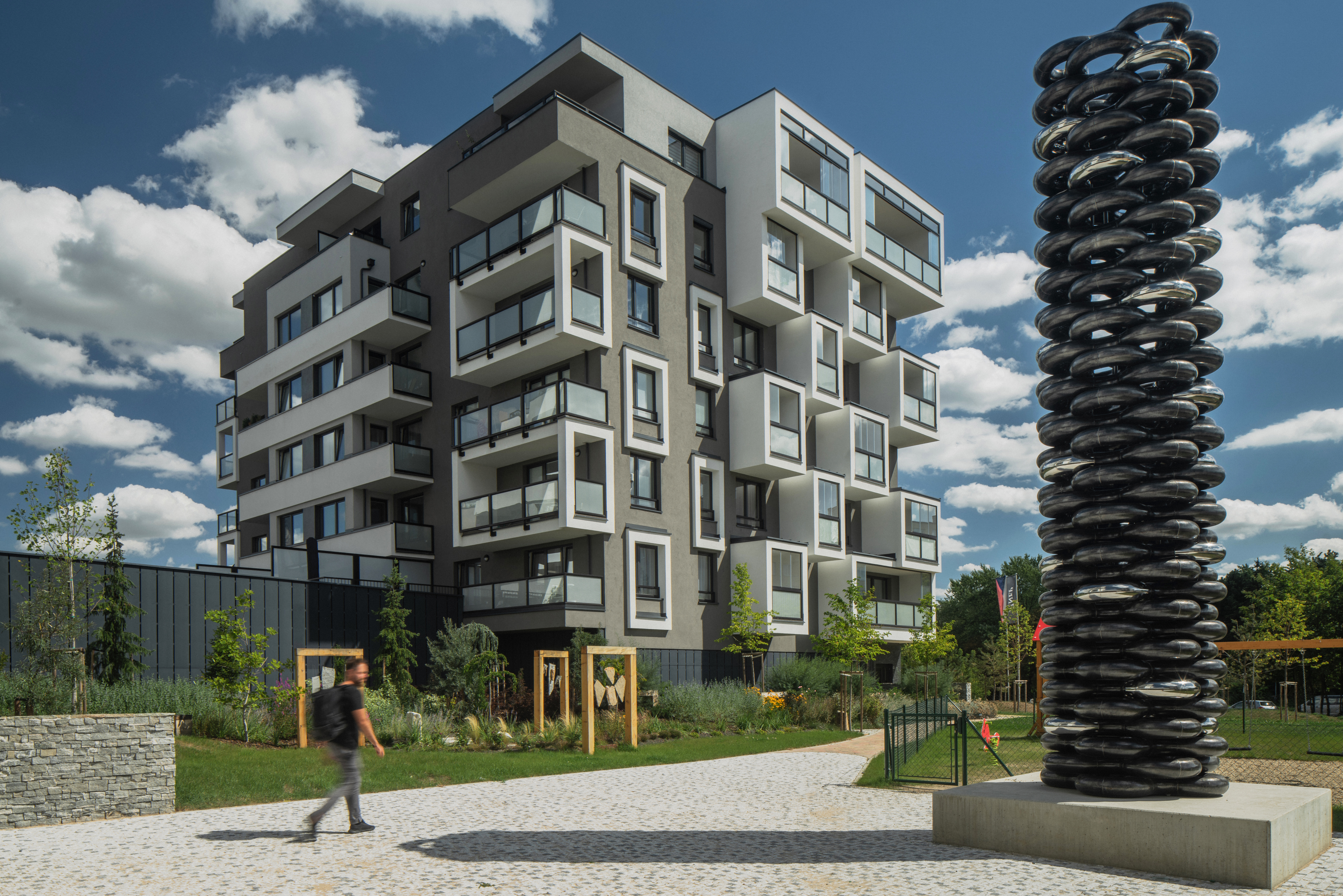
Stele II (2019), Prague-Prosek

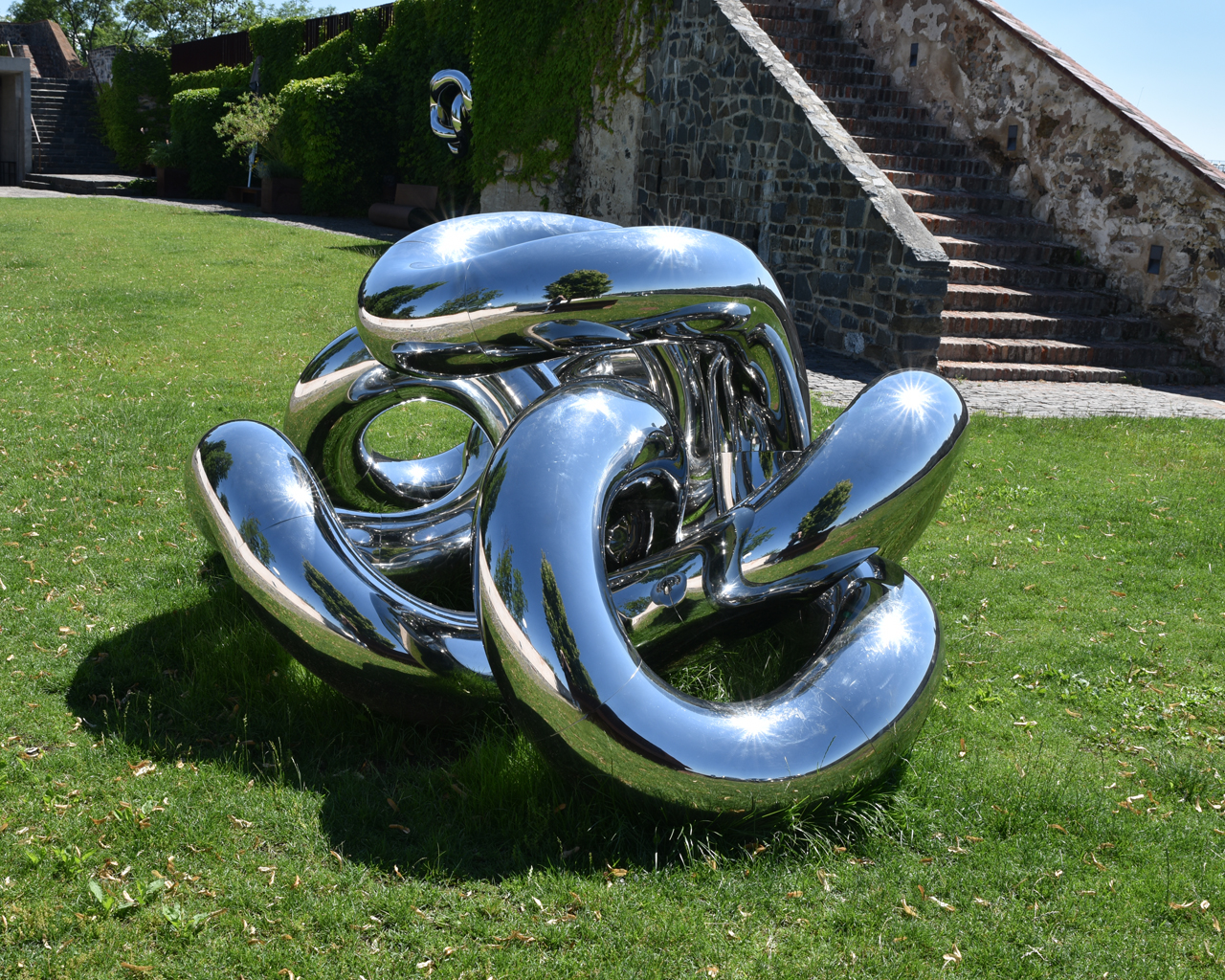
Heart (2020)

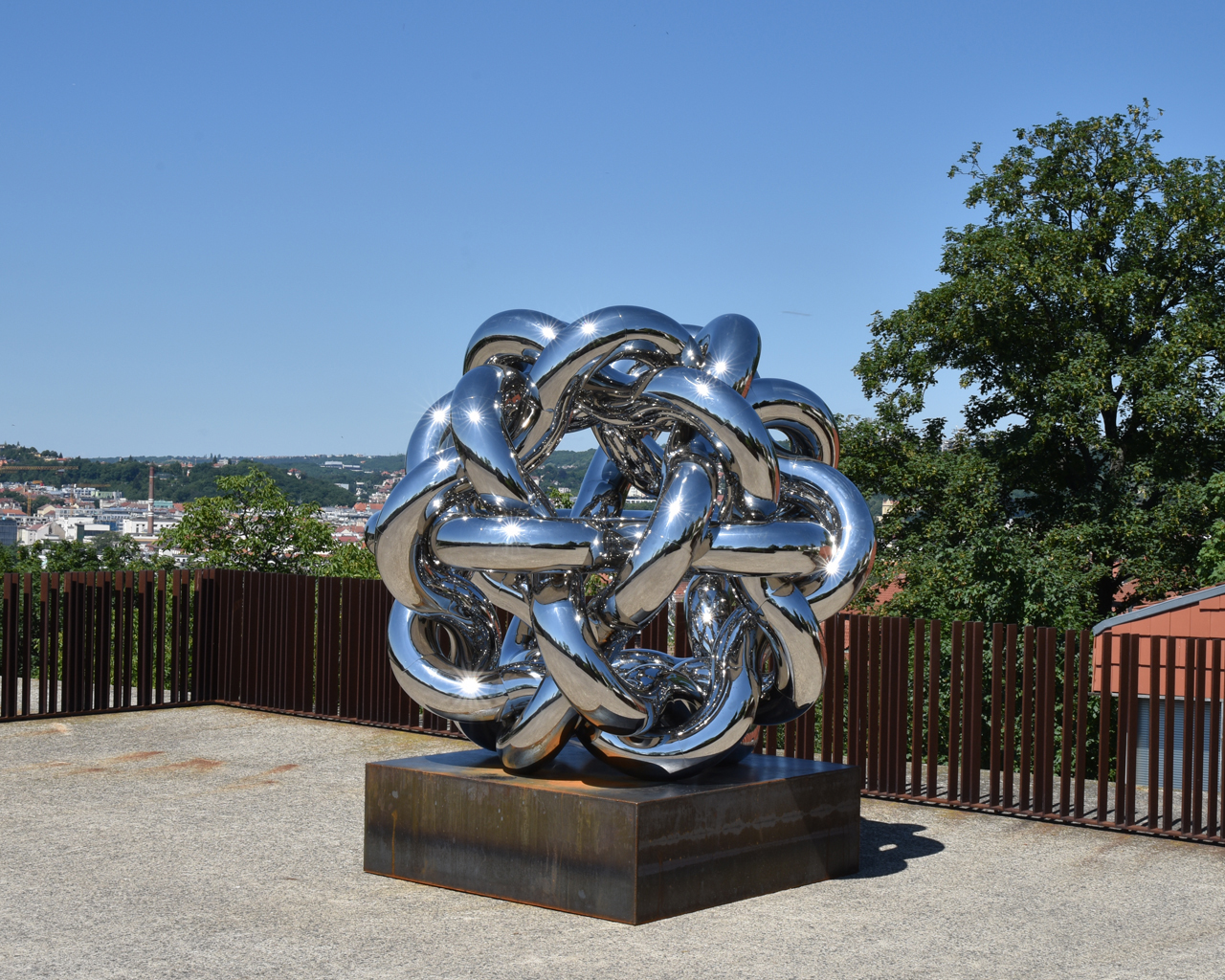
Sirius (2020)

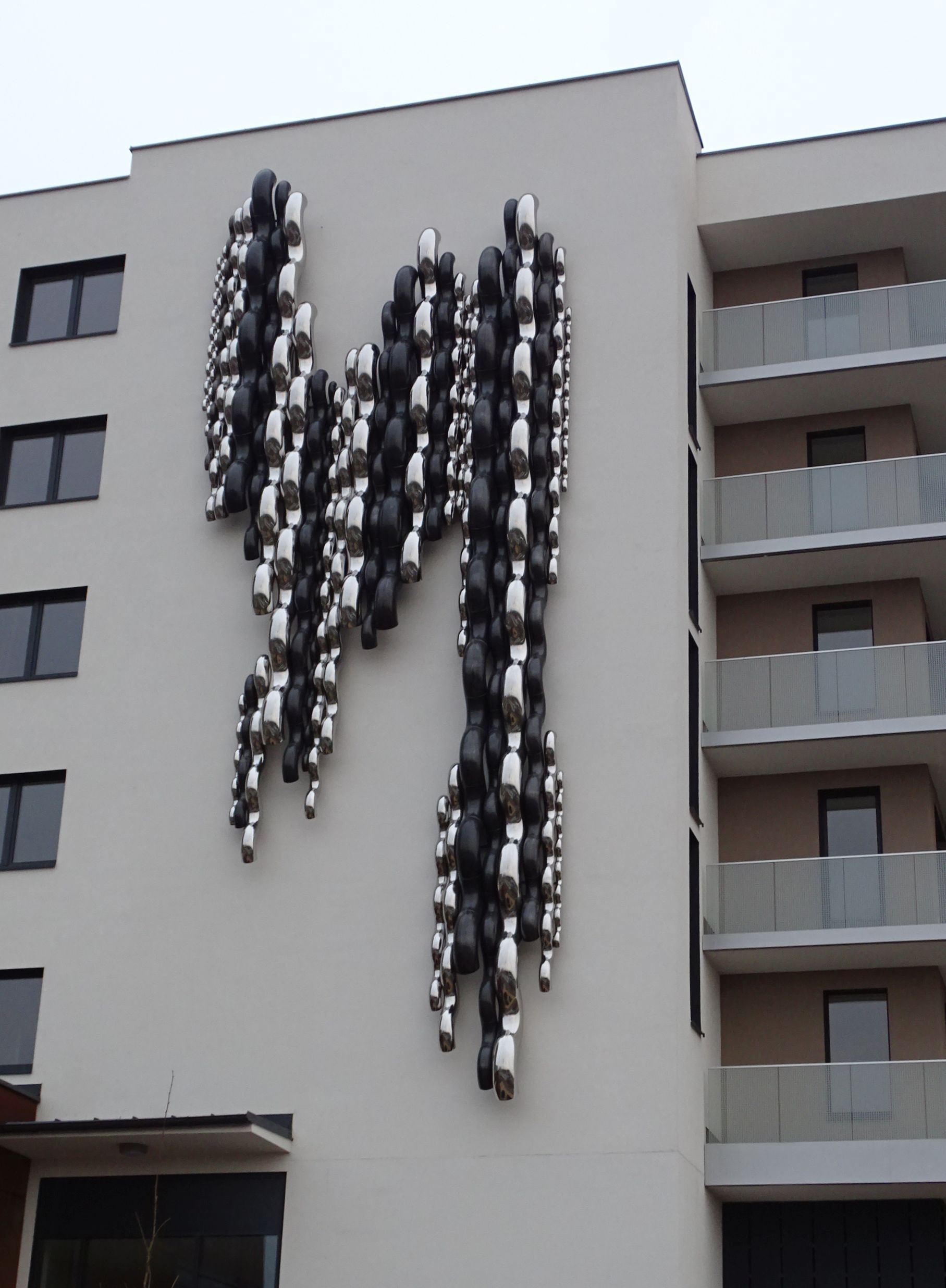
Relief Barrandien (2022), Prague-Barrandov

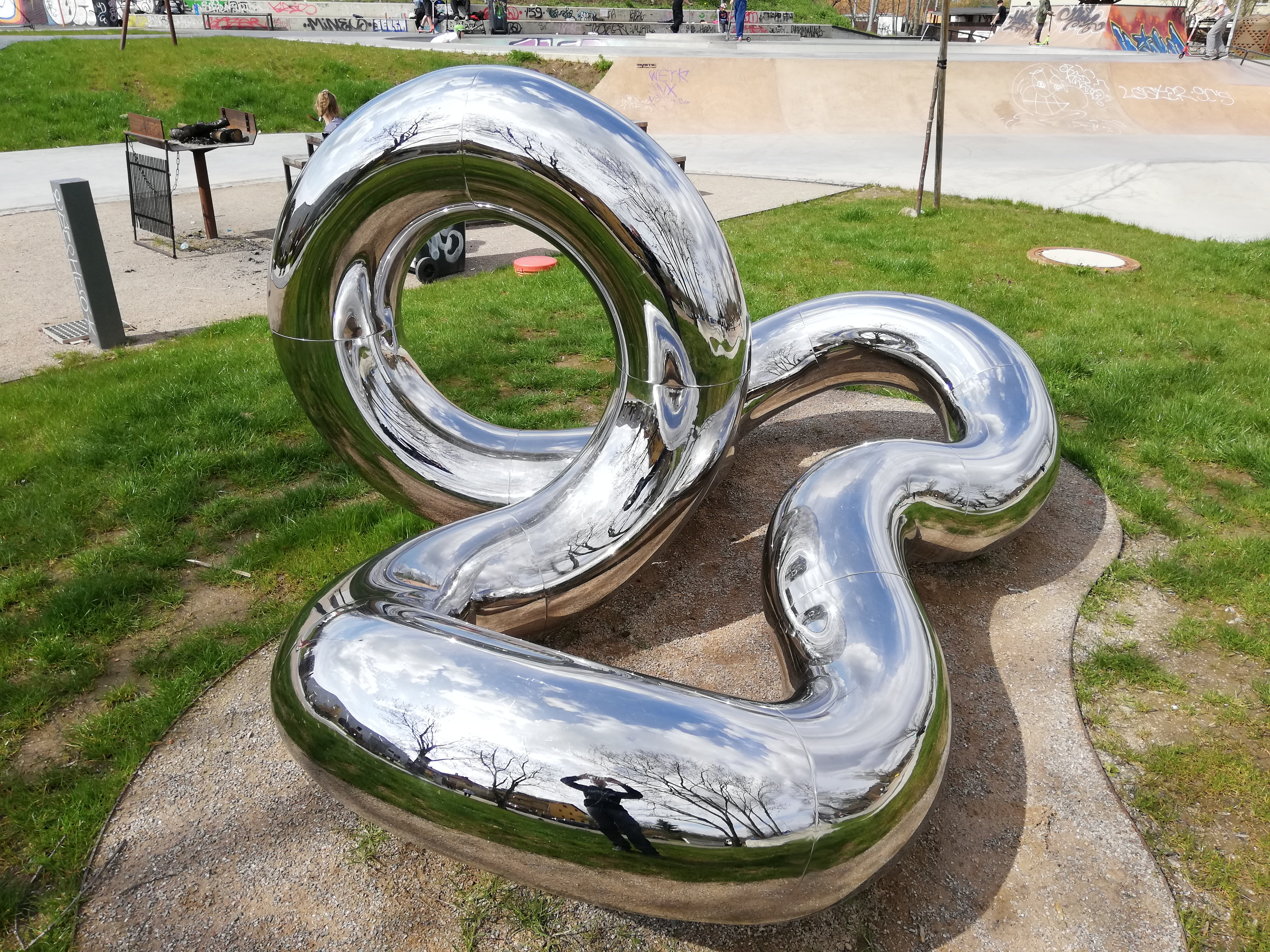
Kick flip (2022); Skateboard Park, Bubec Studio, Prague-Řeporyje

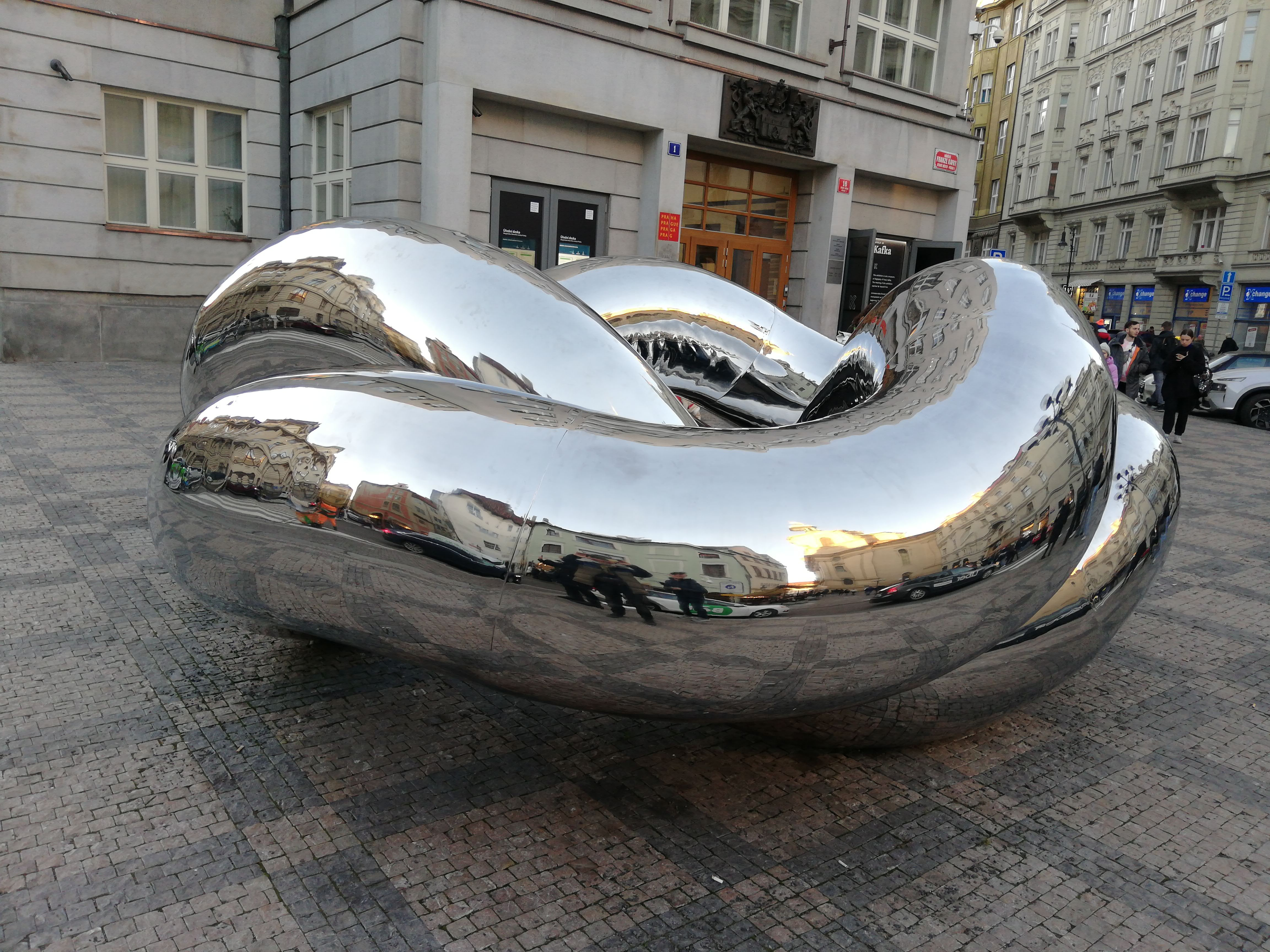
Trichodon (2023); Franz Kafka Square, Prague 1

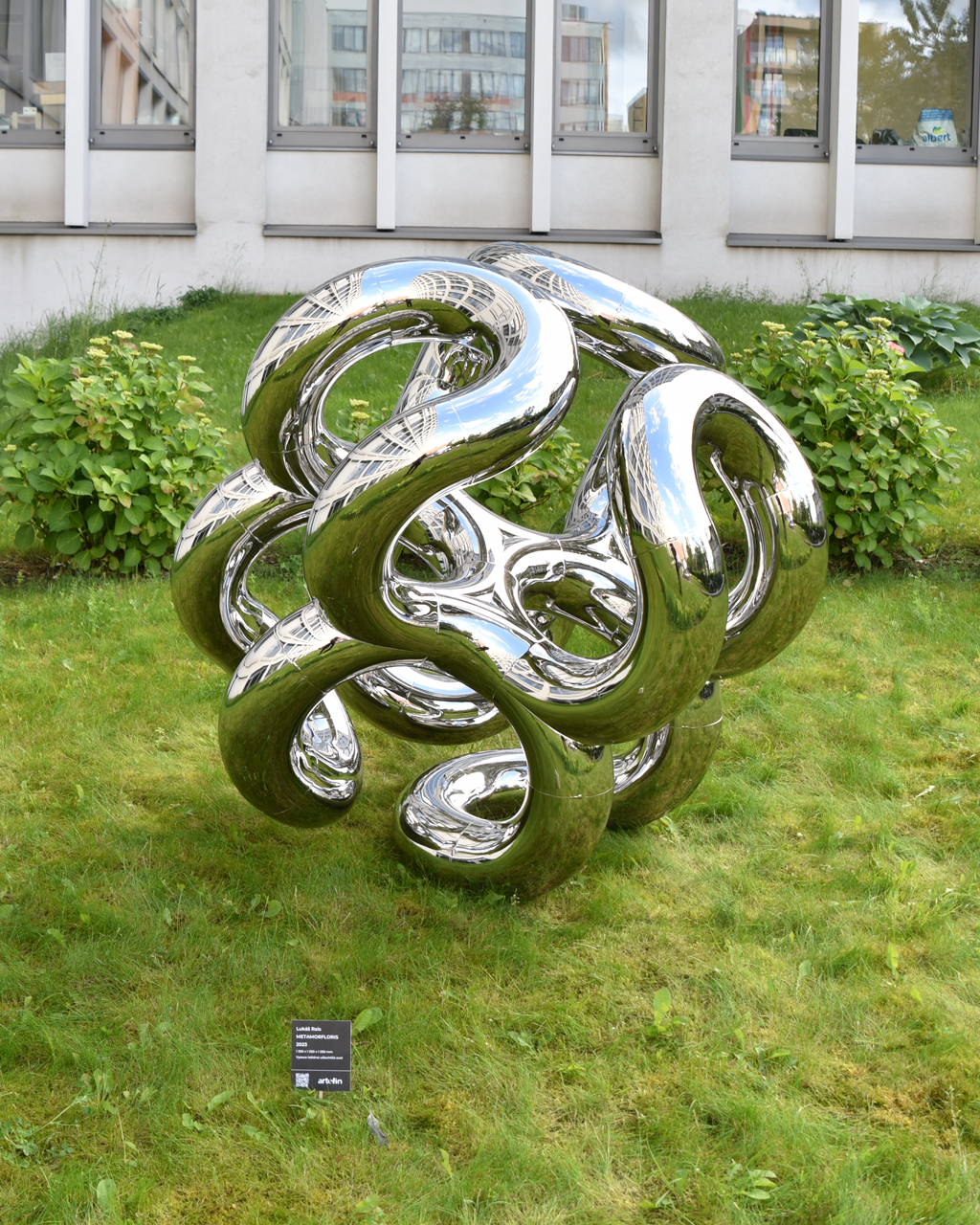
Metamorfloris (2023)

=== Exhibitions (selection) ===
==== Solo ====
- 2011 Archimedon – piazzeta of the National Theatre
- 2011 Uřízni to větší a pak to tam namlať / Cut it bigger and then stuff it in there – Art-pro gallery, Prague
- 2012 Lukáš Rais: Svěží a hebké / Fresh and Soft, St. Lawrence Church, Klatovy
- 2012 Lukáš Rais: Irony, Libeň synagogue, Prague
- 2013 Lukáš Rais: Inside, Trutnov City gallery
- 2014 Čestmír Suška, Lukáš Rais: Ocelové skulptury / Steel sculptures, Prague City Botanical Garden
- 2015 Lukáš Rais and Jakub Flejšar, Kov ve městě XI. – Obliny a hrany / Metal in the City XI – Curves and Edges, Lipník nad Bečvou
- 2016 Lukáš Rais: Metaloids, Hotel Rott, Small Square, Prague 1
- 2022 Lukáš Rais: Sculptures, Light, Matter, Form, and You, the rampart below Karlov, Prague 2

==== Collective (selection) ====
- 2006 Ad Clementinum, Prague
- 2007 Nová sadba / New Planting – Prague City Botanical Garden
- 2009 Designblok 2009, Prague
- 2009 Rajská se sedmi / Paradise with seven, Žižkov for Itself, Paradise Garden, Prague
- 2009 Sculptura Natura, Botanical Garden, Prague
- 2009/2010 Mladí umělci dětem / Young Artists for Children, Hotel Kempinski, Prague
- 2010 Vezmi svoji sochu v neděli k vodě / Take your sculpture to the water on Sunday, Vltava embankment, Prague
- 2010 Sochy ve městě / Sculptures in town, České Budějovice
- 2010 Cloud 9 Conterporary art, Hilton Hotel, Prague
- 2010 Cross check, Sports Hall Sparta Prague
- 2010 Designblok 2010, Prague, Presentation of the original design project "Industrial Soliters"
- 2010 Postavy / Figures, Prague University of Economics and Business
- 2010/2011 Do tohoto světa / Into this world, U Hájků, Prague
- 2011 Art Prague Sculpture, New Town Hall, Prague
- 2013 Industrial soliters, Armaturka gallery, Ústí nad Labem
- 2013 Sochy v Trutnově IV / Sculptures in Trutnov IV.
- 2013 Designblok 2013, Prague, Presentation of an original project featuring heating sculptures for "Industriality"
- 2014 Art Safari 27, Sculpture studio Bubec, Prague
- 2015 Sculpture line, Prague
- 2015 Art Safari 30 de luxe, Sculpture studio Bubec, Prague
- 2017 Art Works in the Office, Jungmann street, Prague
- 2018 Umění ve městě / Art in the City 2018 – České Budějovice
- 2018 Sculpture Line 2018, Prague, Broumov, Ostrava, Luxembourg
- 2019 Velvet edition, Hall of the former company Horák and Hlava, Prague 8
- 2024 V úniku (výstava na téma Jízda) / On the Run (an exhibition on the theme of "Driving"), EPO 1 Gallery, Trutnov-Poříčí

== Sources ==
- Lukáš Rais: Dynamic harmonisation of space, Industriality, Prague 2012
- Petr Volf, Lukáš Rais: Lukáš Rais – Sculptures, 246 p., Karel Kerlický – KANT, Prague 2022, ISBN 978-80-7437-375-6

=== Exhibition catalogues ===
- Ateliér Socha II / Studio Sculpture II, Academy of Arts, Architecture and Design in Prague 2006, ISBN 80-86863-14-X
- Václav Hájek, Mladí umělci dětem (Na podporu Nadace Terezy Maxové dětem) / Young Artists for Children (In Support of the Tereza Maxová Foundation for Children), 2009
- Terezie Zemánková, Průvodce výstavou Suška-Rais / Guide to the Suška-Rais Exhibition, Prague Botanical Garden 2014
- Alice Škvárová (ed.), Sculpture Line 2018 (Mezinárodní sochařský festival / International Sculpture Festival), Smart Point, 2018, ISBN 978-80-906528-5-9
- Marek Schovánek, Louise Beer, Velvet edition, PragArtworks, 2019
