= Škoda Museum =

Automobile museum

- Škoda Muzeum
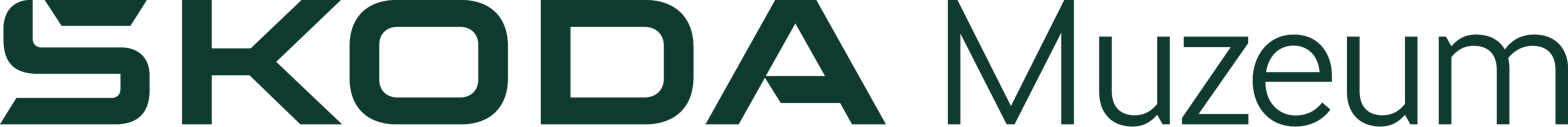

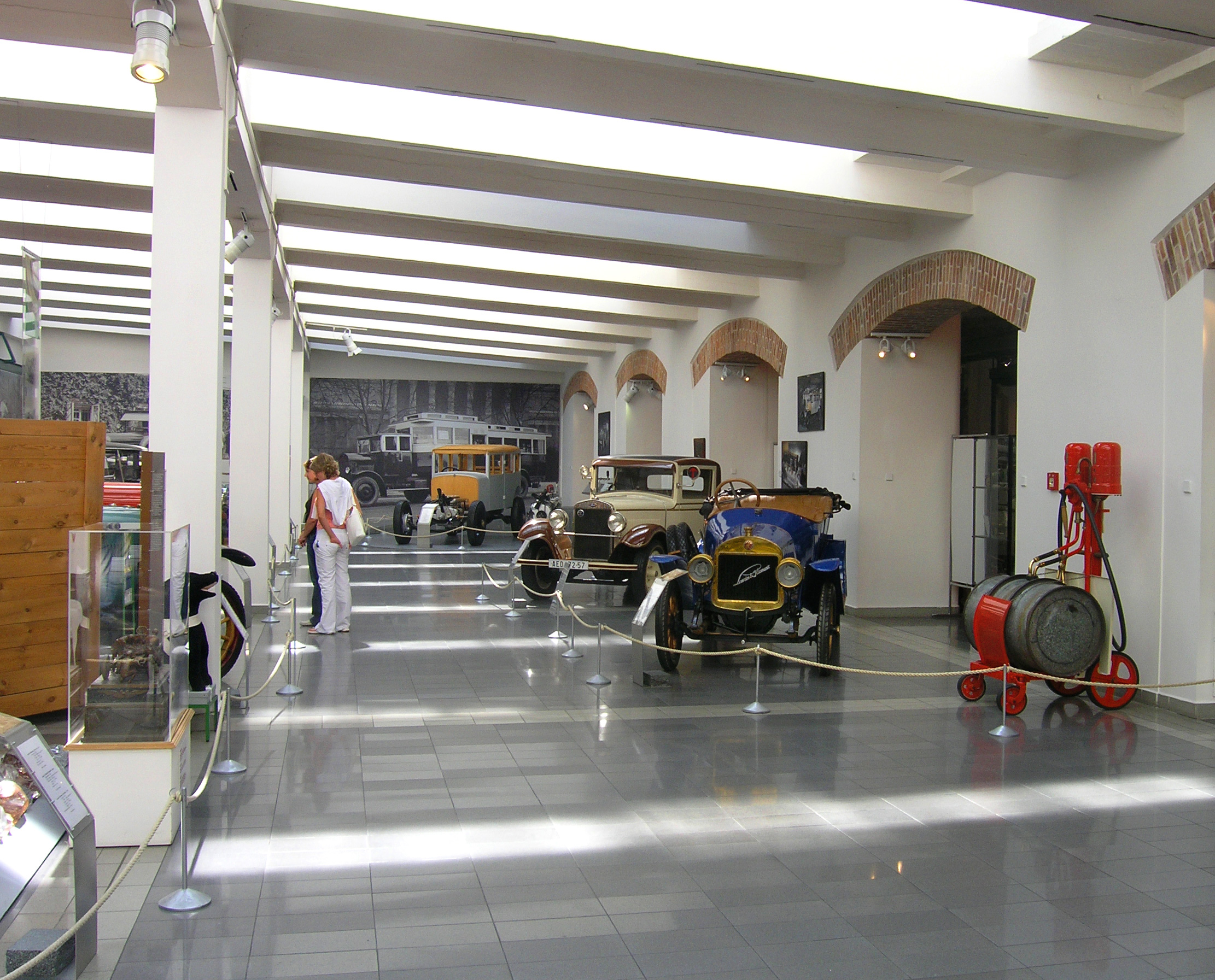
- Interior of the museum
- Interactive fullscreen map
- Established: 1995; 30 years ago
- Location: třída Václava Klementa 294, Mladá Boleslav, Czech Republic, 293 01
- Coordinates: 50°25′7.62″N 14°54′50.84″E
- Website: https://museum.skoda-auto.com/

The Škoda Museum (Czech: Škoda Muzeum) is a museum in Mladá Boleslav in the Czech Republic. It presents the history of the automobile manufacturer Škoda Auto (known until 1925 as Laurin & Klement), which is one of just four automakers in the world which has an unbroken history stretching back to 1895. It is located next to a large production facility.

== History ==
The museum was opened in 1995, to the centenary of the company's founding. A remodeled museum was opened in Autumn 2012. It is located in the former factory building of Škoda Auto where cars were manufactured until 1928.

== Collection ==
The museum has an area of 1,800 m^{2} (19,000 sq ft). It presents about 340 exhibits, of which 46 are cars.

The museum is divided into three divisions in separate spaces. In Evolution section are the most important products, from the first bicycle, motorcycle, tricycle, first car (1906) with performance of seven hp and other important products up to newest designs. There is also a racing car 720 Spider, 1100 OHC and Super-Sport Ferat. Division Tradition shows cars from different eras, brand participation in motorsport, logo development and personalities and events associated with the brand. In the last section Precision, people can see reconstruction of historical car in various stages of development.

== Tourism ==
The museum is visited by about 120,000 visitors annually.

The museum cooperates with Ferdinand Porsche's Birthplace in Liberec-Vratislavice nad Nisou and offers discounted admission for both museums.

== Gallery ==
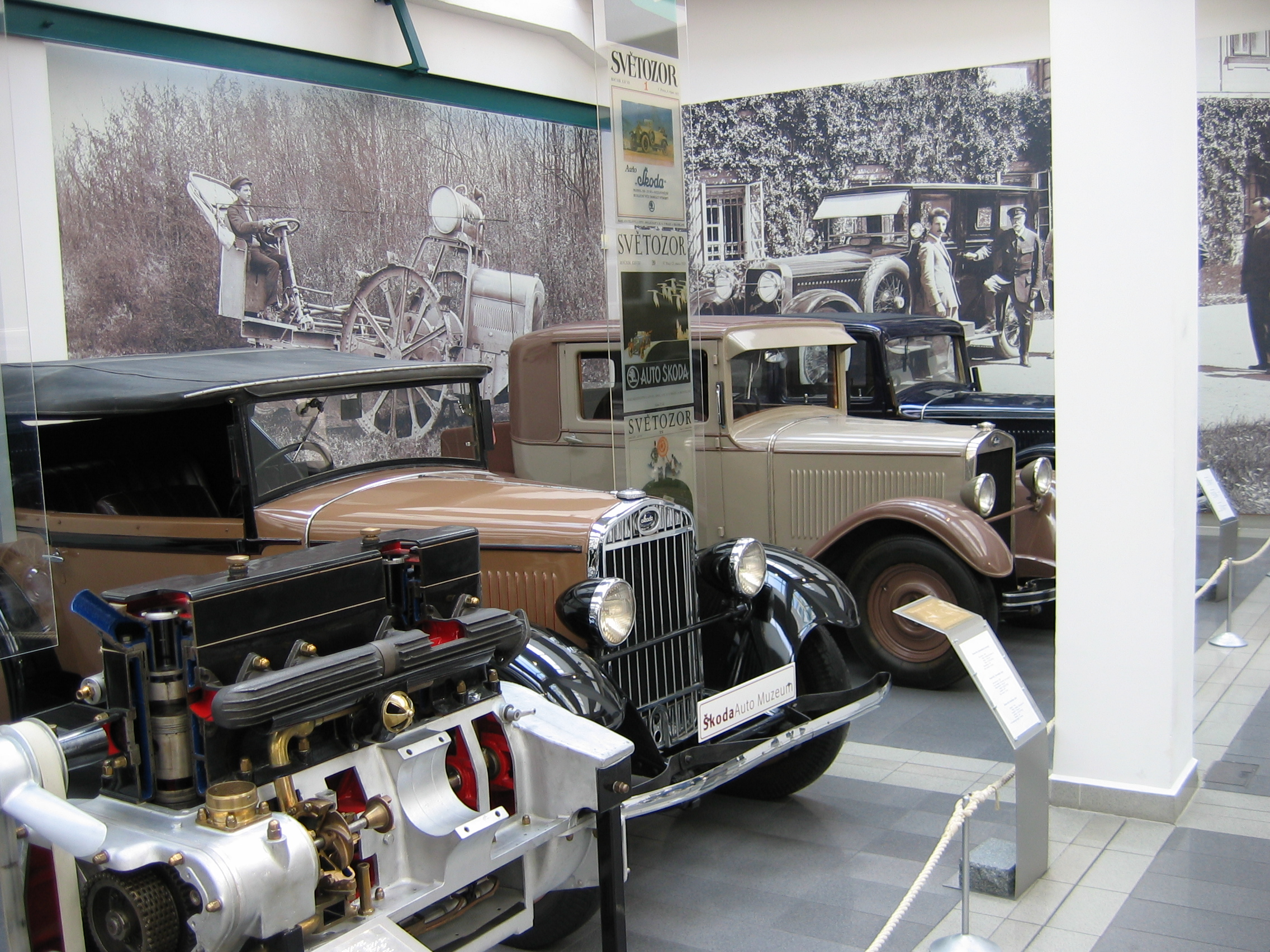
Škoda 422 faeton (front) and Škoda 422 Tudor

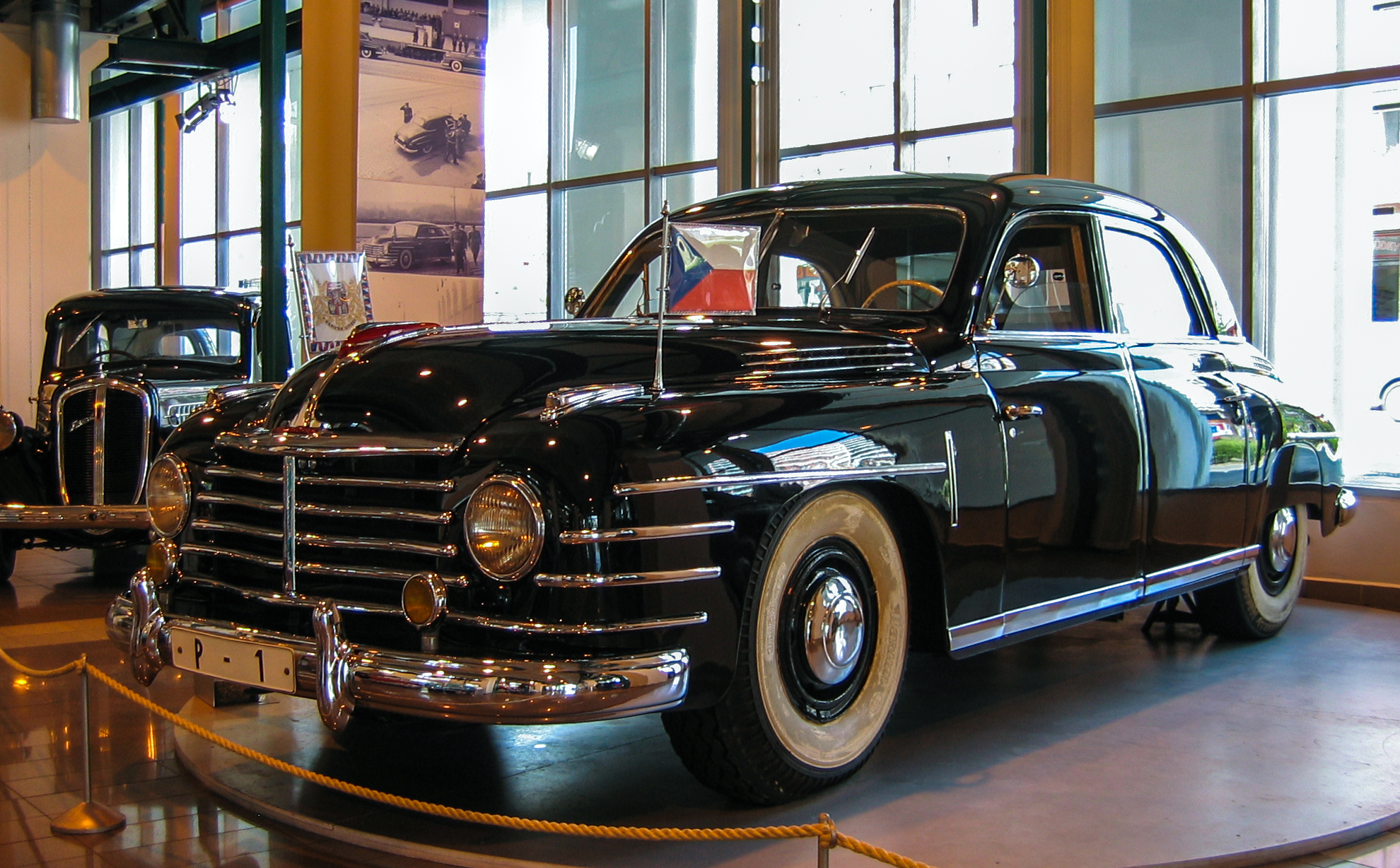
Škoda VOS Limousine

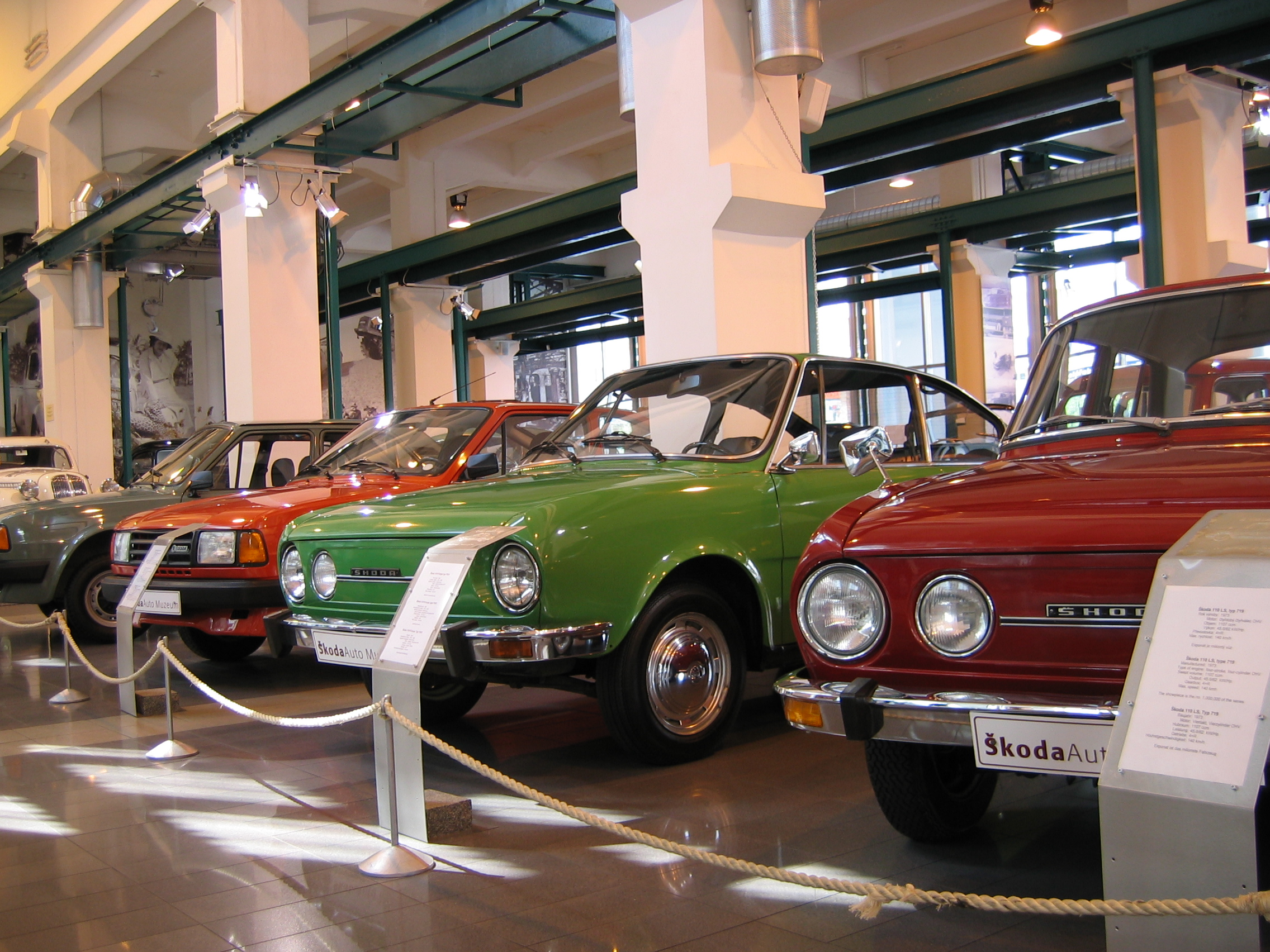
Škoda 110R

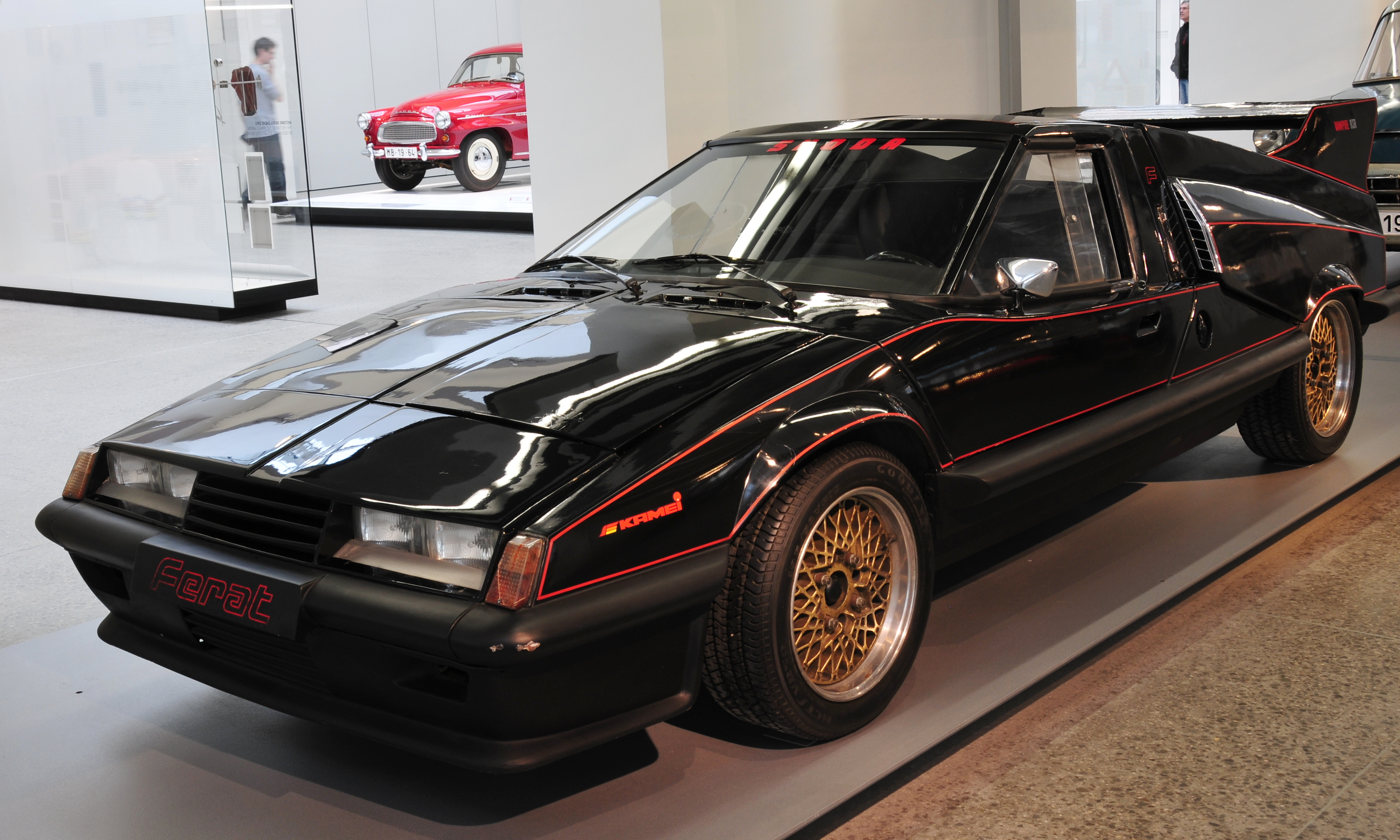
Škoda Super-Sport Ferat

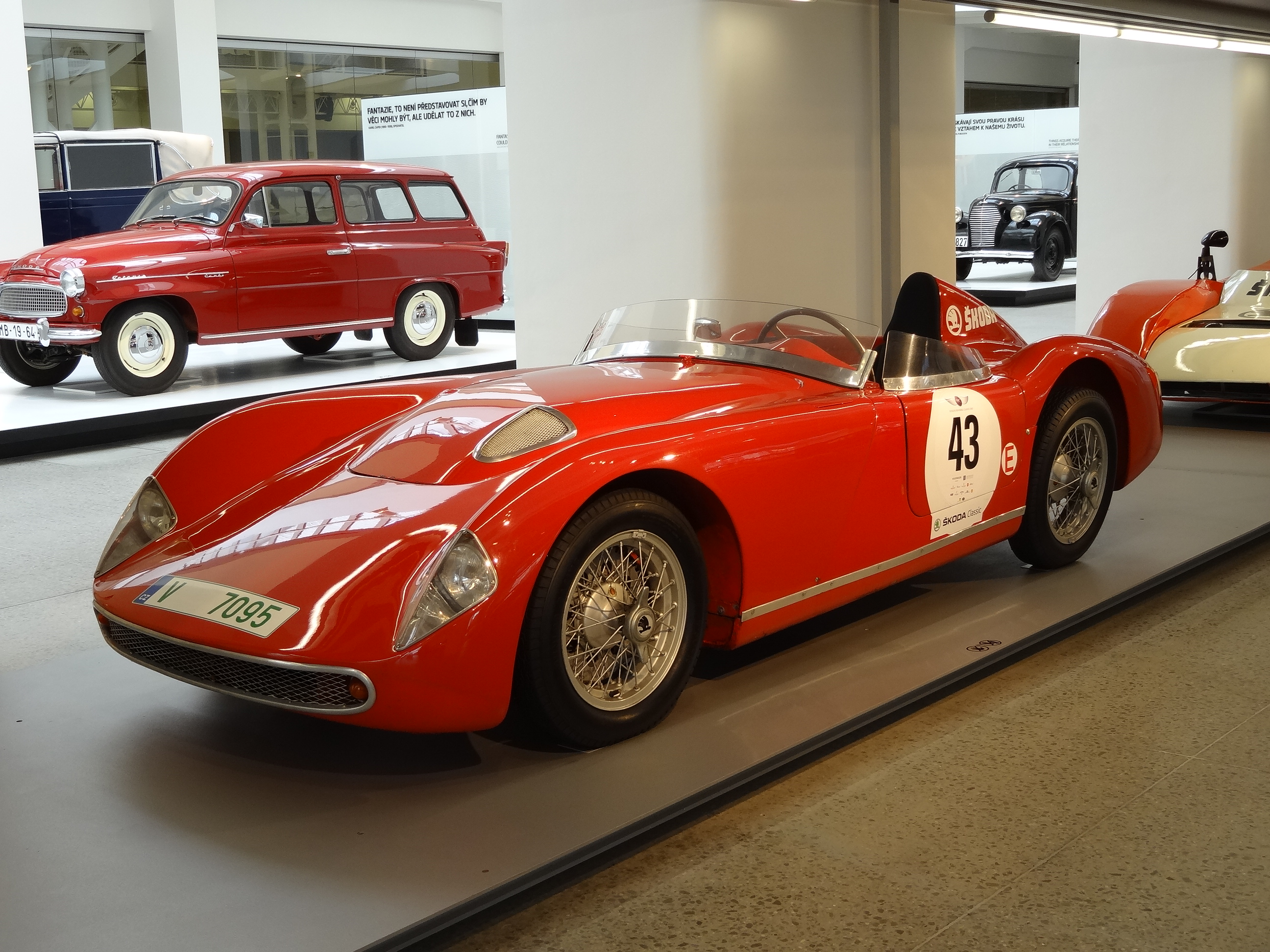
Škoda 1100 OHC

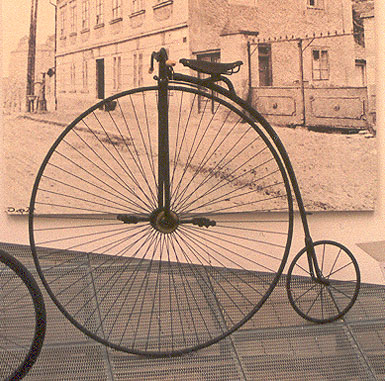
A penny-farthing in the museum

== See also ==
- Techmania Science Center
