= Techmania Science Center =

Czech science center

Coordinates: 49.7409°N 13.3615°E

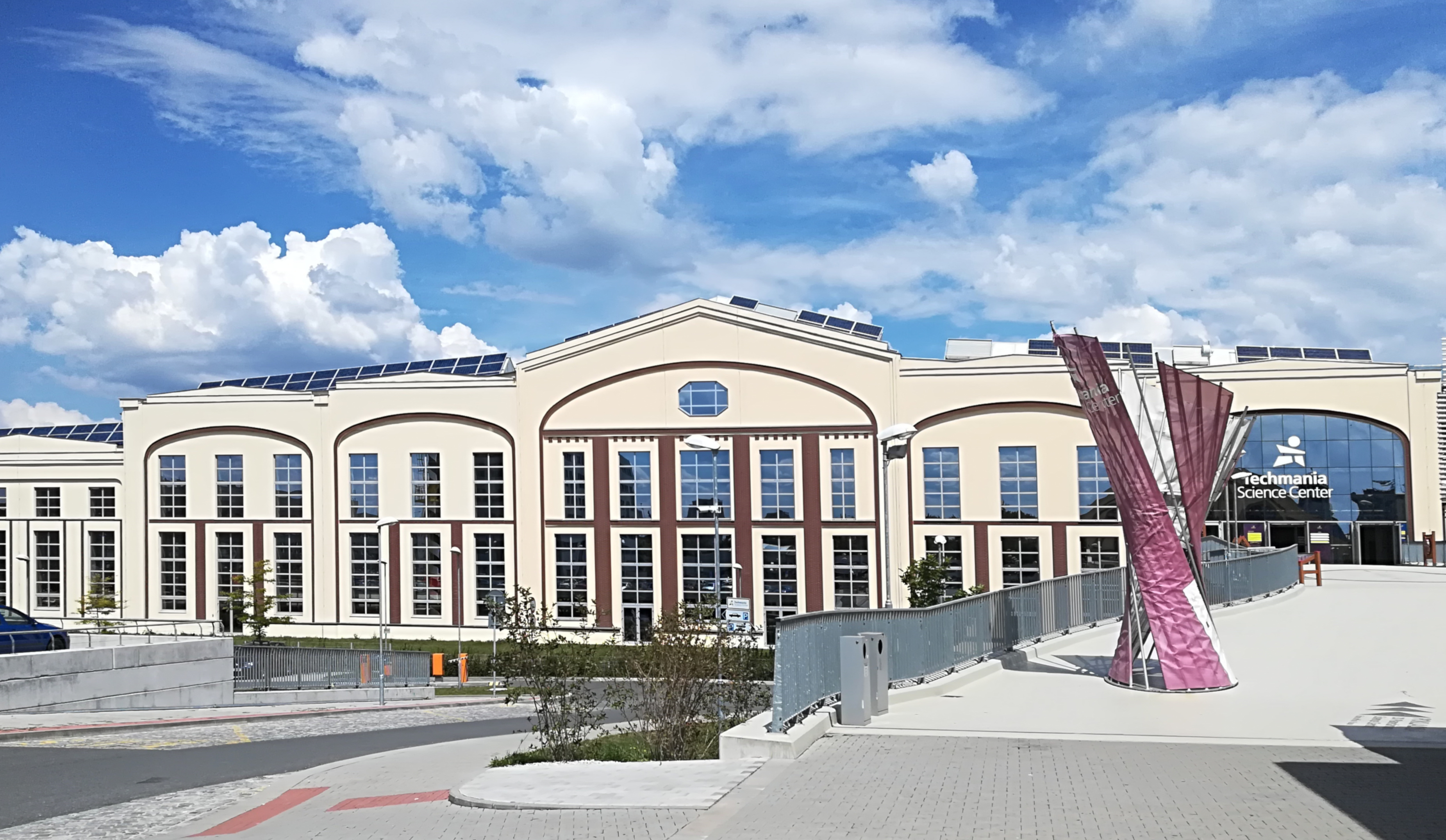
- Established: 2005
- Location: Plzeň, Czech Republic
- Type: Science museum
- Visitors: 200,000 (2018)
- Founders: Škoda Transportation; University of West Bohemia
- Public transit access: Techmania (bus and trolleybus stop)
- Website: techmania.cz

Techmania Science Center is one of the first science centers in the Czech Republic and an institution of informal education. The project was established in 2005 by the Škoda Transportation joint-stock company and the University of West Bohemia in Plzeň. The intention has been to build up a modern, interactive center (often known as a science center) in the industrial estate of the Škoda company.

The mission of Techmania is to help the public, especially young people, to get more familiar with science, technology and with the development of human knowledge in general. Another goal is to point out the unanswered questions for which the next generation, the young visitors of the science center, will find answers.

The science center opened its gates to the public on November 4, 2008. Since then over 300 000 visitors have experienced science and engineering in an interactive environment of learning in the science center, which is based on explanations of particular physical or mathematical principles by means of game-like activities. The interactivity of these activities involves visitors making the exhibits move.

Between 2008 and 2013 the center offered following main exhibitions:

- The Edutorium, which composes of 60 physics-based exhibits and there are categories for optics, mechanic, electricity, magnetism, acoustics. This part of Techmania is mostly used by school teachers to explain physical phenomenon (over 30% of Techmania's visitors is made up by (high) school groups).
- There's the Rub! is a collection of Brain-teasers and scientific toys.
- The exhibition ŠKODA tells the story of the Škoda company and shows, for example, world unique locomotives, a trolleybus or a steam engine from the year 1909, which is used to demonstrate steam power.

Between September 2010 and March 2012 the controversial artwork Entropa was displayed at Techmania.

The science center was closed down on September 2, 2013 because of its total renovation. The first 3D planetarium in the Czech Republic is going to be opened as a part of the “new” Techmania on November 4, 2013. The main hall of the science center will be re-opened in March 2014 showing new interactive exhibitions dealing for example with renewable sources of energy, physics, human body, water world etc.

An integral part of Techmania's activities are the “scientific shows” which demonstrate, for example, static electricity (Van de Graaff generator), Bernoulli's principle, non-Newtonian fluid and many other phenomena as well as lectures on special topics.

== See also ==
- Škoda Auto Museum
- List of science centers#Europe
