= Entropa =

Sculpture by David Černý

- The Entropa sculpture on display in the hall of the Justus Lipsius building in Brussels.
- Artist: David Černý
- Year: 2009

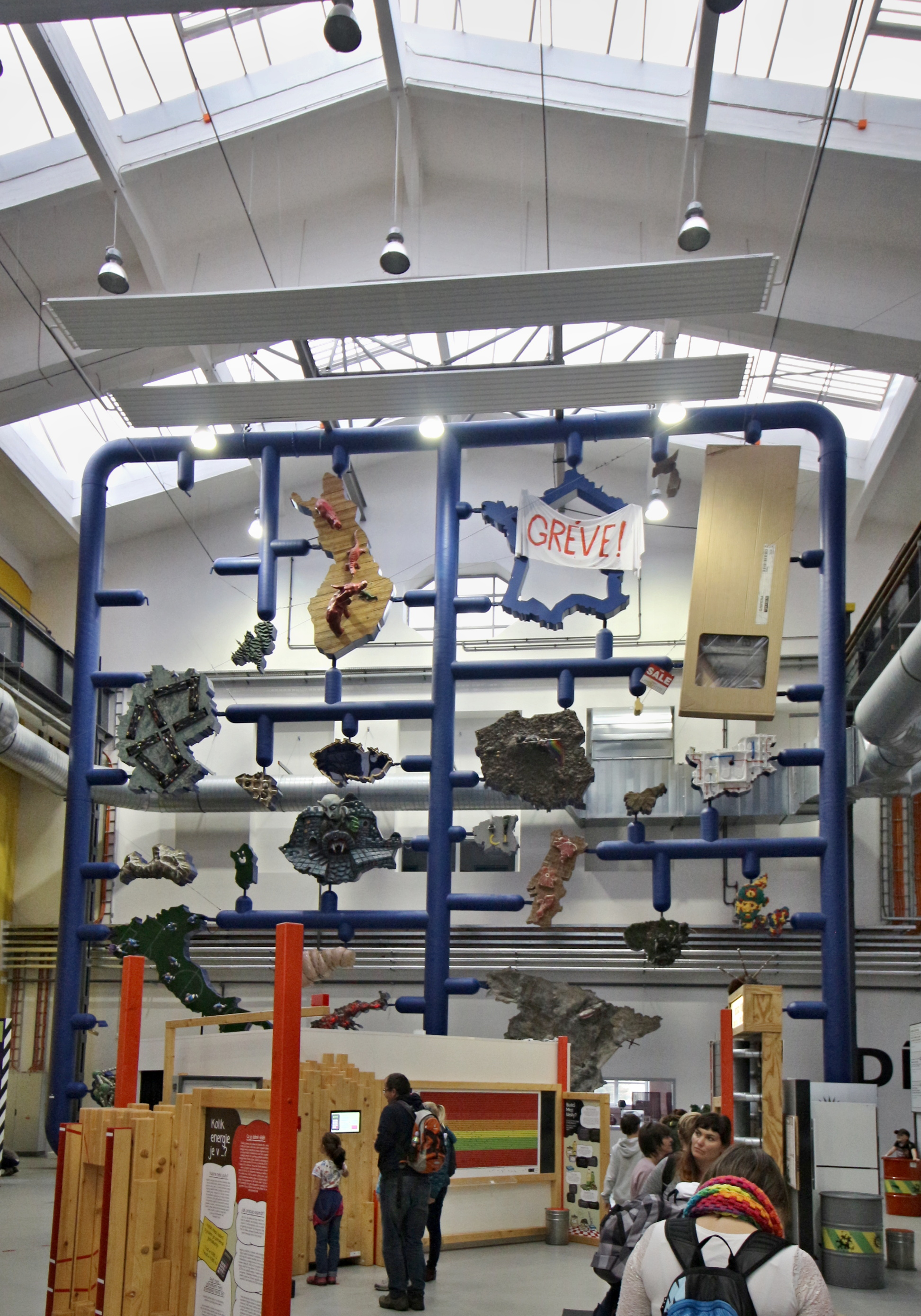
Techmania Science Center

Entropa is a sculpture by Czech artist David Černý. The project was commissioned by the Czech government to mark the occasion of its presidency of the Council of the European Union, and was originally designed as a collaboration for 27 artists and artist groups from all member countries of the European Union. However, as a hoax, Černý and three of his assistants created a satirical and controversial piece that depicted pointed stereotypes of the EU member nations. Fake artist profiles were also created by Černý and his accomplices, complete with invented descriptions of their supposed contributions. The title puns on entropy (the tendency of systems towards disorder) and Europa.

The sculpture was unveiled informally on 12 January 2009, followed by its official media launch date three days later. The sculpture was originally on display in the Justus Lipsius building in Brussels. Between September 2010 and March 2012, the sculpture was on exhibit at the Techmania Science Center in Plzeň. A copy of the sculpture has also been planned for the Nová Scéna cafe in the National Theatre in Prague.

== Background ==
The Council of the European Union adheres to a rotational presidency system, whereby the governments of member countries exchange leadership every six months. It is customary for the presiding country to place an exhibit in the Justus Lipsius building, with past works avoiding controversy. For example, France, which had held the presidency before the Czech Republic, simply erected a large balloon in the French national colours in honor of the tradition.

== Theme ==
Entropa is an ironic jab at the issue of European integration and the stereotypes associated with each country within the European Union. It is subtitled '"Stereotypes are barriers to be demolished", along with the Czech European Union Presidency's motto of "Europe without barriers". According to David Černý, the sculpture's primary artist, Entropa "lampoons the socially activist art that balances on the verge between would-be controversial attacks on national character and undisturbing decoration of an official space". In an interview with The Times, Černý stated that the sculpture was influenced by the Monty Python brand of humour. At the launch ceremony, he added Sacha Baron Cohen and Les Guignols de l'info's portrayal of Nicolas Sarkozy as other influences.

The work is made of glass-reinforced plastic and the joints of steel. It covers approximately 256 square metres (2,760 sq ft), measuring 16.4 metres (54 ft) high and 16.5 metres (54 ft) wide. Three-quarters of the weight comes from the frame, making up a combined total of 8 tonnes. It resembles the parts of a model kit, containing pieces in the shapes of the 27 member states of the EU. Each piece has a distinctive theme that portrays stereotypes about the country, some of which are portrayed in a particularly provocative manner. Among the pieces which have attracted the most attention are those of Bulgaria, Denmark, Germany, Poland, and Slovakia.

The sculpture was installed between 5 and 11 January 2009 in the presence of David Černý, three assistants, four climbers, two technicians, two cameramen and a representative of the Czech Permanent Representation to the EU.

=== Nations included in the sculpture ===
With no clear indication made by the artist nor by the official presentation, various interpretations of a single country can be drawn, and this list is by no means definite. Some of the physical pieces differ slightly from the form presented in the official booklet:

- Austria, a known opponent of atomic energy, is depicted as a green field dominated by nuclear power plant cooling towers with vapour coming out of them at intervals.
- Belgium is presented as a box of half-eaten Praline chocolates with the pattern of Brussels waffles.
- Bulgaria is depicted by a series of connected "Turkish" squat toilets with neon lights connecting and illuminating them. This piece of the sculpture was later hidden with fabric.
- Cyprus is cut in half, referencing the partition of Cyprus.
- Czech Republic's own piece is an LED display, which flashes controversial quotations by Czech President Václav Klaus.
- Denmark is depicted as being built out of Lego bricks, and some claim to see in the depiction a face reminiscent of the cartoon controversy, though the resemblance has been denied by Černý.
- Estonia is presented with power tools resembling a hammer and sickle, citing the country's consideration of a ban on Communist symbols.
- Finland is depicted as a wooden floor including a male with a rifle lying down, imagining an elephant, a hippo and a crocodile.
- France is draped in a "GRÈVE!" ("STRIKE!") banner, referencing France's history of industrial action.
- Germany is a series of interlocking Autobahns with cars moving about on them, described as "somewhat resembling a swastika", though the statement is not universally accepted. Some Czech military historians also suggest that the autobahns resemble the number "18", which some Neo-nazi groups use as code for A.H., the initials of Adolf Hitler.
- Greece is depicted as a forest that has been entirely burned, possibly representing the 2007 Greek forest fires or the 2008 civil unrest in Greece.
- Hungary features an Atomium consisting of watermelons and Hungarian sausages, based on a floor of peppers.
- Ireland is depicted as a brown bog with bagpipes protruding from Northern Ireland. The bagpipes also play music in five-minute intervals.
- Italy is depicted as a football pitch with several players who appear to be masturbating, possibly indicating what some see as the country's "fetish for football".
- Latvia is shown as covered with mountains, in contrast to its actual flat landscape.
- Lithuania includes a series of dressed Manneken Pis-style figures urinating, with the streams of urine being illuminated by yellow glass fibres.
- Luxembourg is displayed as a gold nugget with a "For Sale" sign.
- Malta is depicted as a tiny island with a prehistoric dwarf elephant, as well as a magnifying glass in front of the elephant.
- The Netherlands is depicted as having disappeared under the sea with only several minarets still visible.
- Poland has a piece with priests erecting the rainbow flag of the gay rights movement on a field of potatoes in the style of the famous photograph Raising the Flag on Iwo Jima.
- Portugal is shown as a wooden cutting board with three pieces of meat in the shape of its former colonies of Brazil, Angola, and Mozambique.
- Romania is a Dracula-style theme park, which is set up to blink and emit ghostly sounds at intervals.
- Slovakia is depicted as a Hungarian sausage (or a human body wrapped in Hungarian tricolor) being strangled by a string.
- Slovenia is shown as a rock engraved with the words "First Tourists Came Here, 1213".
- Spain is covered entirely in concrete, with a concrete mixer situated in the north-east, referencing the heavy development on the Spanish Mediterranean coast.
- Sweden, unlike the other pieces in the sculpture, does not have an outline, but is instead represented as a large IKEA-style self-assembly furniture box containing Gripen fighter planes (as supplied to the Czech Air Force).
- The United Kingdom, known for its Euroscepticism and relative isolation from Europe, is "included" as a missing piece (an empty space) at the top-left of the sculpture.

== Reaction ==
Entropa has inspired debate in Europe since the day of its first unveiling. Various commentators have noted that this is probably the first such exhibition in the history of art displays on behalf of the rotary Presidency of the EU Council that has been controversial in nature, contrasted by the fact that such pieces usually go by unnoticed. The work drew what has been described by one reporter as "a never-before-seen crowd." It has been praised by some viewers for being "hilarious" and for inspiring discussion about art, but has angered and offended others.

In June 2009, David Černý himself said that he expected completely different reactions than those described below. In his opinion, Bulgaria doesn't even make it to the top three of the most provocative countries caricatured by Entropa. The most provocative country is Poland, with the reference to gays. It is followed by the UK (missing) and Slovakia that, according to Mr Černý, is a bubble restricted by Hungary.

=== Political controversy ===
The sculpture of Bulgaria

The sculpture of Bulgaria on 22 January 2009 covered by black fabric

On 13 January 2009, the day after the exhibit was informally unveiled, Bulgaria's ambassador to the EU registered the country's protest with the European Commission, and sent a formal protest note to the Czech government. Bulgaria's depiction in the sculpture, as a series of squat toilets, is one of the most provocative, and after the informal unveiling of Entropa, the Bulgarian government demanded that the sculpture be taken down before its official launching. This action was never taken, but after continuing complaints, the Bulgarian depiction was covered with black fabric on 20 January 2009. Individuals outside the government, as well, expressed outrage about the portrayal:

It is one thing portraying, say, France as a country on strike, but quite another to show my homeland as a toilet. That is downright wrong.

— Georgi Gotev, Bulgarian journalist

Bulgarian news portal News.bg commented that the country's deputy was "obviously interpreting [the exhibit's] idea as an insult attempt." A number of non-government organizations, including Polish Indeks 73, were opposed to covering part of the work and initiated online petitions.

Jan Vytopil, the man in charge of cultural events during the Czech EU Presidency, has defended the exhibit, arguing that the presence of a "squat toilet Bulgaria" in the presence of the other patently absurd depictions made it clear that the piece seeks to demolish stereotypes rather than cause controversy. Czech Deputy Prime Minister Alexandr Vondra also frequently stressed that the government committee which authorized the piece wanted to avoid censorship:

What we approved was a blank map; we decided not to censor anything. When we saw the finished work, we thought it might be too much. That remains to be seen. At any rate, it is an expression of freedom, we decided not to censor it.

— Alexandr Vondra in Lidové noviny on January 13, after doubt had been cast on the existence of Černý's supposed collaborators

On 14 January 2009, the Slovak National Party called on Foreign Affairs Minister Ján Kubiš to demand the removal of the sculpture, calling it an offence to the Slovak nation. On 15 January 2009, Kubiš complied and lodged a formal protest, but did not demand the removal of the sculpture.

Given the controversial nature of the portrayals of other countries, Czech diplomats expected protests from other countries as well. However, As of 14 January 2009 these had yet to materialize. In fact, the public in Poland appeared to be largely in favour of Poland's portrayal, with 64% considering it "spot on" and only 13% thinking it "an insult to Polish people", according to an online poll by news portal TVN24.

Ole Molesby, the Danish Ambassador to the Czech Republic, stated that he did not expect the Mohammed caricature protests to begin anew, and that Denmark did not intend to complain. Černý denied that the similarity was intentional.

=== Authorship controversy ===
On 13 January 2009, the authorship of Entropa came into question. Officially, the artwork was to have been an international collaboration between David Černý and artists from the other 26 EU countries. However, on that day, Alexandr Vondra announced the work was probably created by a smaller group of people, explaining that Černý did not inform him about this until the evening before. The original news article in Lidové noviny pointed out that some of the artists' names did not seem to exist in their countries' citizen records and had no Internet footprint. Černý himself admitted on 13 January that the artists' names had been fabricated.

The official booklet provided summaries of past expositions for most of the alleged authors, some of which matched those of known artists. For example, Austria's "Sabrina Unterberger" had a résumé that apparently belonged to Ernst Logar. Many of these "artists" had their own websites (designed by Tomáš Pospiszyl, Krištof Kintera and Libor Svoboda), but the contact information listed was false (other than the e-mail addresses, which were functional).

Lidové noviny originally listed Belgium, Germany, Greece, Ireland, and the UK as countries for which fictitious artists' identities were given. These specific claims were later retracted and replaced by general charges that some of the names in the booklet are non-existent, their résumés erroneous, or that the artists denied knowing David Černý or having cooperated with him.

On the evening of 13 January 2009, Černý officially admitted that the piece was actually created entirely by him and two friends, and that all the officially supplied artists' identities had been fabricated. In a prepared statement, Černý offered an apology to Prime Minister Mirek Topolánek, Deputy Prime Minister Alexandr Vondra, and the Czech Minister of Foreign Affairs Karel Schwarzenberg "and their offices" for deceiving them, stating he did not want them to be responsible for his fabulations. The statement went on to point out: "We knew the truth would come out. But before that we wanted to find out if Europe is able to laugh at itself."

The names of Černý's collaborators were given as Tomáš Pospiszyl and Krištof Kintera. The authors maintained that a larger international team of people was involved in the project's execution. They explained that they originally wanted to contact artists from all 27 member countries of the EU, but failed due to limited time and financing. Alexandr Vondra responded with an official statement expressing his disappointment and stressed that Černý would bear responsibility for deceiving the government.

Due to the sculpture's potential for controversy, the point that each country's piece was designed by an artist from that country was strongly stressed by the Czech government. According to Lidové noviny, Czech Prime Minister Alexandr Vondra remarked: "The fact remains that we have provided a platform for free artistic expression and that is how Entropa must be viewed. But, had I known the circumstances were different than we had thought for a year and a half, I would not have authorized it." Vondra attempted to distance the Czech government from Černý's work early on, saying,

It is a piece of art—nothing else... If Europe is not strong enough to look at this, it would be a tragedy. It is Europe through the eyes of 27 artists. It is not Europe through the eyes of the Czech presidency.

=== Fraud accusation ===
The sculpture reportedly cost 12 million CZK to make, of which 10 million was contributed by New World Resources, a Dutch mining company which owns OKD in the Czech Republic, and 2 million CZK was paid by the Czech government, which has subsequently leased the work for an additional 1.2 million CZK until the end of June. After the fabrication came to light, Černý was accused of misappropriating state funds. He responded that the money was not used at all, since the artists knew they would deviate from the stated project, and would be returned.

=== Response by authors ===
Černý originally stated that he meant for the sculpture to be amusing, saying, "Irony is about making fun. It is not meant to offend anybody", and later issuing an official statement saying, "We wanted to see if Europe is able to laugh at itself." On 15 January, Černý reflected on the hostile reception of Entropa:

I certainly don't feel like a winner. That's how I'd feel if there were a few shocked Brusselian bureaucrats walking around the piece, shaking their heads, thinking about what those Czechs have done here. We expected this to be treated as a joke, a happening, a nice installation, nothing else. That we are already discussing the removal of some parts doesn't seem like a tremendous success to me. I'd be much happier if it remained whole.

The authors defended their choice to use false names in creating the sculpture by stating the deception was part of the art:

Grotesque exaggeration and mystification is a hallmark of Czech culture, and creating false identities is one of the strategies of contemporary art.

Černý has also said that making this sculpture in this way was "more fun." Later, however, the artists apologized for the deception, saying, "We apologize to Prime Minister Mirek Topolánek, Deputy Prime Minister Alexandr Vondra, Minister Karel Schwarzenberg and their offices for not informing them about the true state of things and thus deceiving them." Krištof Kintera, one of the true co-authors of the sculpture, said in an interview that the mystification was supposed to last longer, but that it was untenable—both ethically, as the artists didn't want to cause more trouble for Czech diplomacy, and practically, as they couldn't keep answering e-mails using the fabricated artists' identities.

Kintera also commented that the sculpture revealed a divide between Western and Eastern Europe: "We didn't want to defame anyone; advanced European democracies are used to many things, but the East still strives to promote itself in a positive light, so it's not as well attuned to this."

== Fate of the sculpture ==
After the true authorship of the sculpture came to light, Alexandr Vondra stated its continued display was under review because Černý had violated the government's specifications of the project, which, in line with Černý's original description, called for an international collaboration of artists. On 14 January 2009, the official Entropa presentation page was withdrawn from the Czech presidency's website. Nevertheless, the sculpture was ceremonially launched on 15 January 2009. Alexandr Vondra again defended the piece, saying, "we consider Entropa to be art, nothing more and nothing else."

During the ceremony, David Černý again apologized to the Czech government and expressed regret that the sculpture was considered offensive. He said the offending pieces would be removed if officials cannot be persuaded about the authors' intentions.

== Removal ==
On 23 April 2009, Černý's intention to remove the sculpture prematurely on 10 May was published, which he presented as a protest against the way in which Topolánek's government had been deposed and against the prepared Fischer's cabinet, which was eventually installed on 8 May.

The removal of the sculpture began on 11 May. Černý himself was not present, although he had earlier suggested the contrary. A crew he sent there dismantled the sculpture and on Thursday, 14 May loaded its parts into three trucks, which had to come one by one because of limitations of the Justus Lipsius building. Afterwards, the pieces were transported by road to Prague.

The sculpture was set up again in the Centre of Contemporary Art DOX in Prague-Holešovice and inaugurated on 11 June 2009, in presence of guests, including former Czech president Václav Havel. Entropa was on display in the Techmania Science Center in Plzeň as part of an EU exhibition.

== See also ==
- Art criticism
