= Krištof Kintera =

Czech artist and sculptor (born 1973)

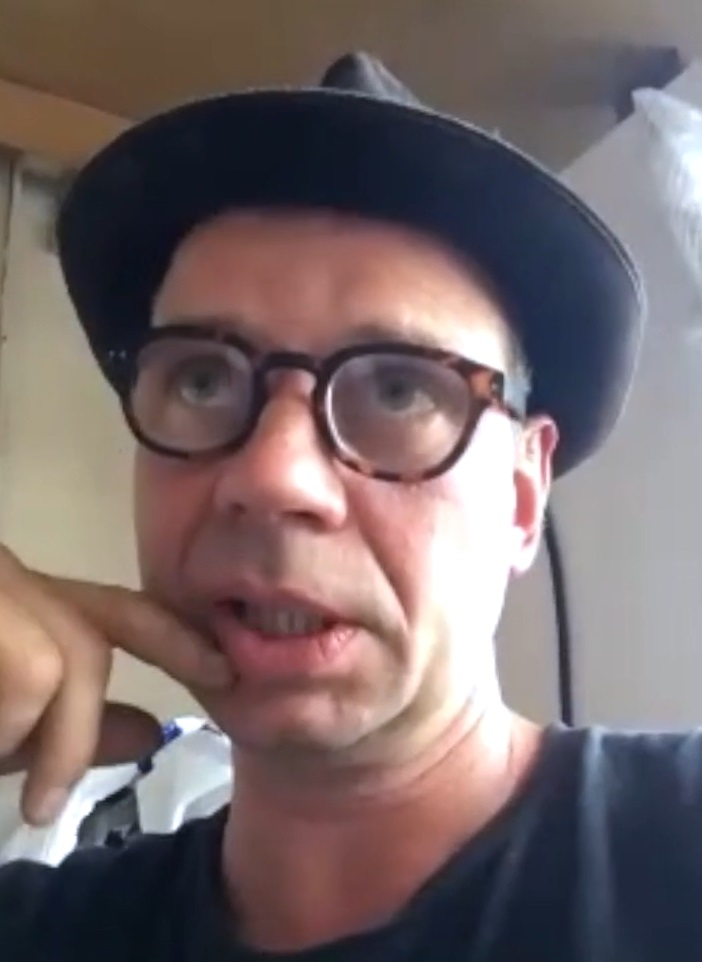
Krištof Kintera in 2020

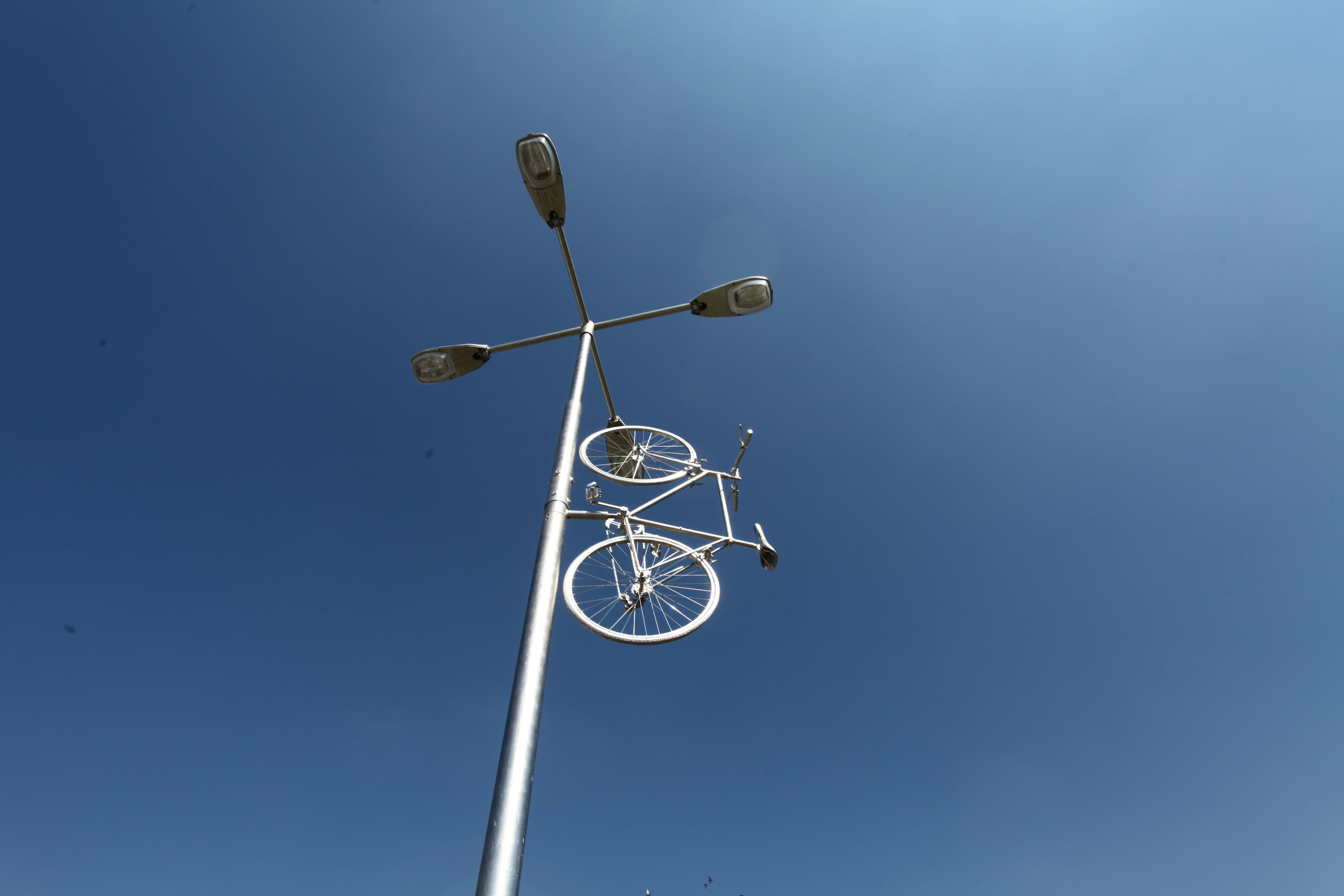
Bike to Heaven

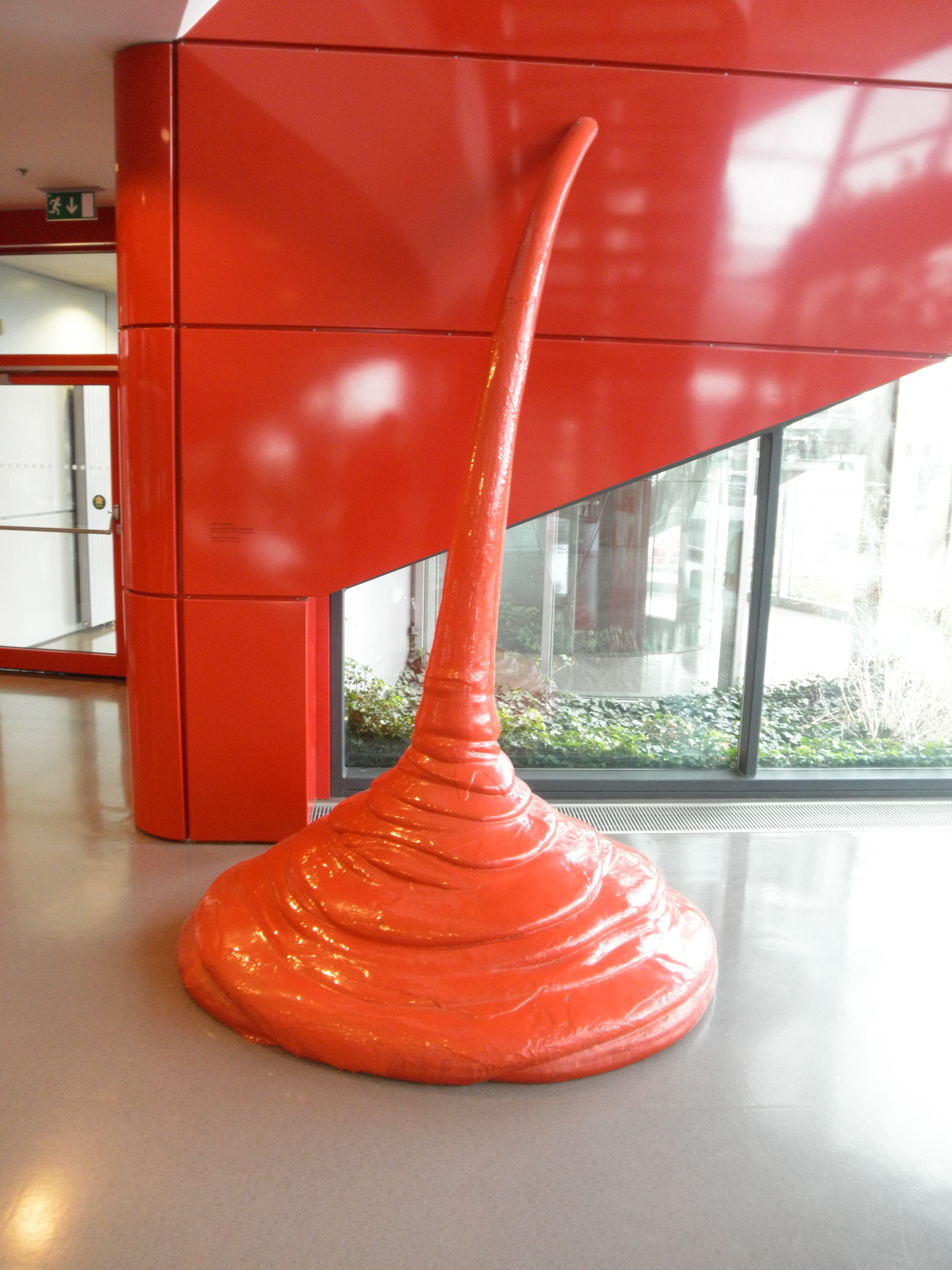
Red is coming

Krištof Kintera (born 20 September 1973 in Prague) is a Czech artist and sculptor. He was nominated for the Jindřich Chalupecký Award three times. He was one of the co-creators of the Entropa sculpture, which was displayed in Brussels as part of the Czech Republic's Presidency of the Council of the European Union in the first half of 2009.

Kintera was awarded the Personality of the Year award for living artists in 2011 thanks to his monument to suicide under the Nusle Bridge, and again in 2012, this time shared with fellow artist Pavel Mrkus. In 2013, his 14 metres (46 ft) high Bike to Heaven monument, which commemorates all cyclists killed on the streets of Prague, was unveiled in the Holešovice district of the city.
