= Obora Hvězda =

Park and nature reserve in Prague, Czech Republic

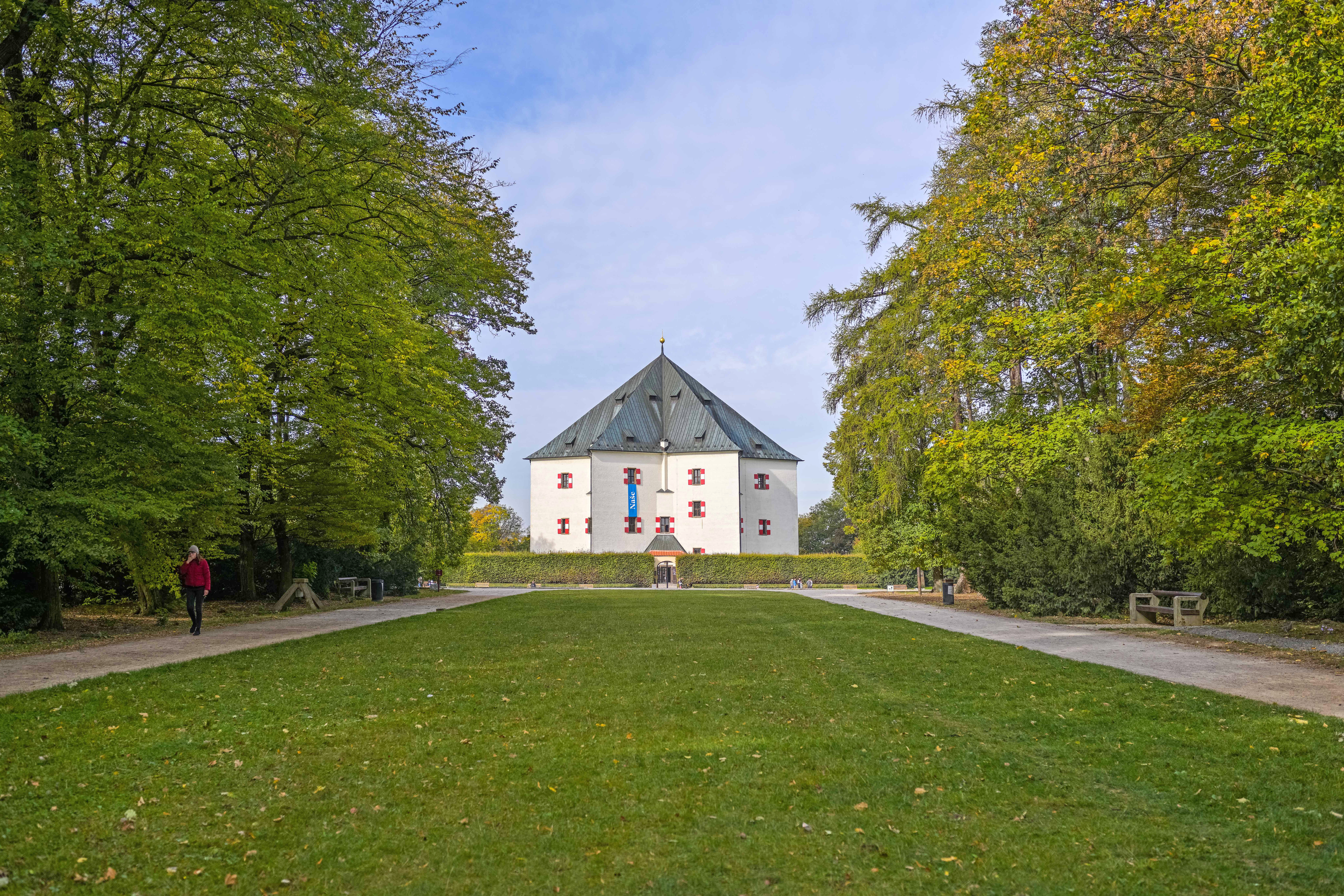
- Interactive map of Obora Hvězda
- Location: Prague, Czech Republic
- Coordinates: 50°04′57″N 14°19′49″E

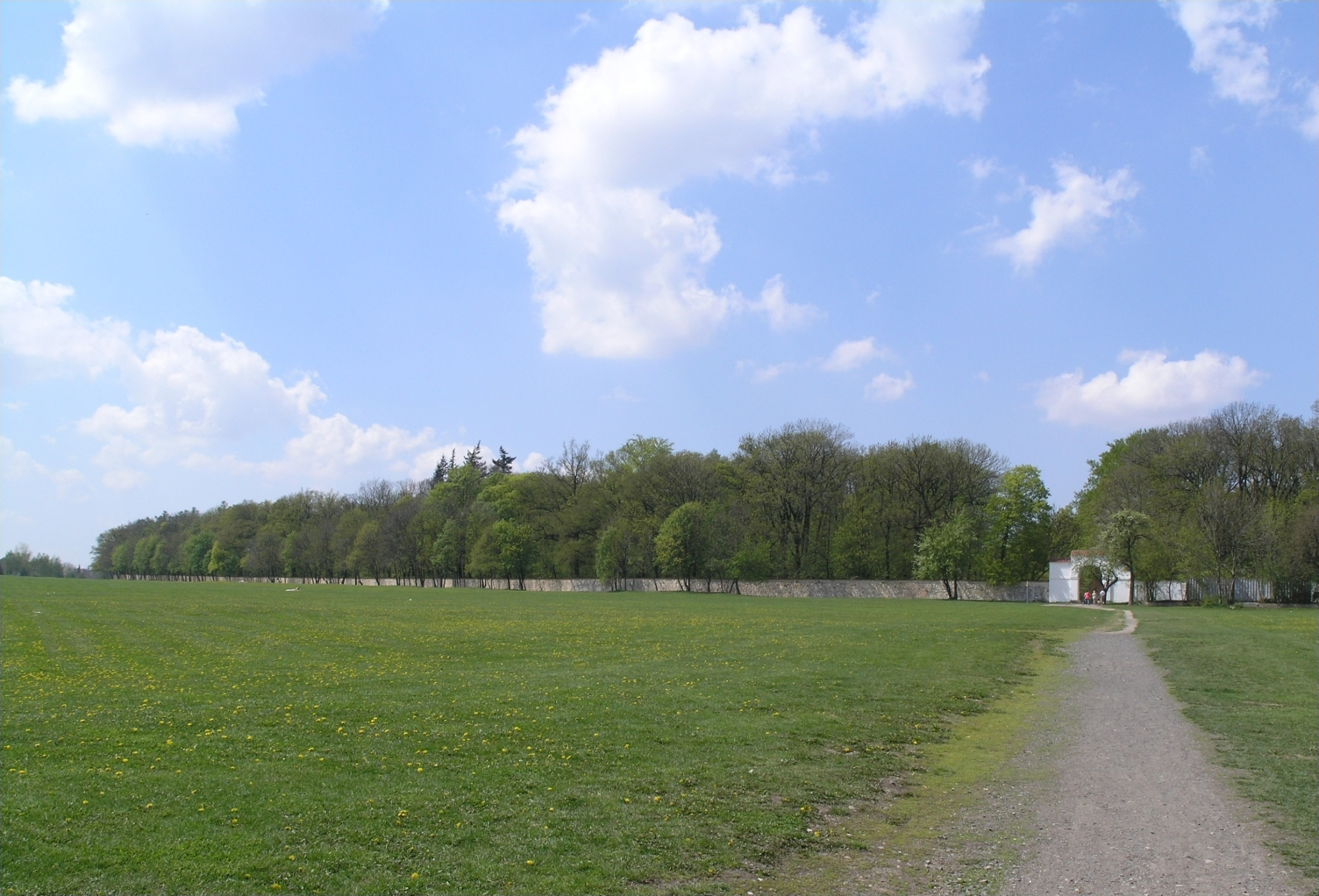
External view of eastern entrance

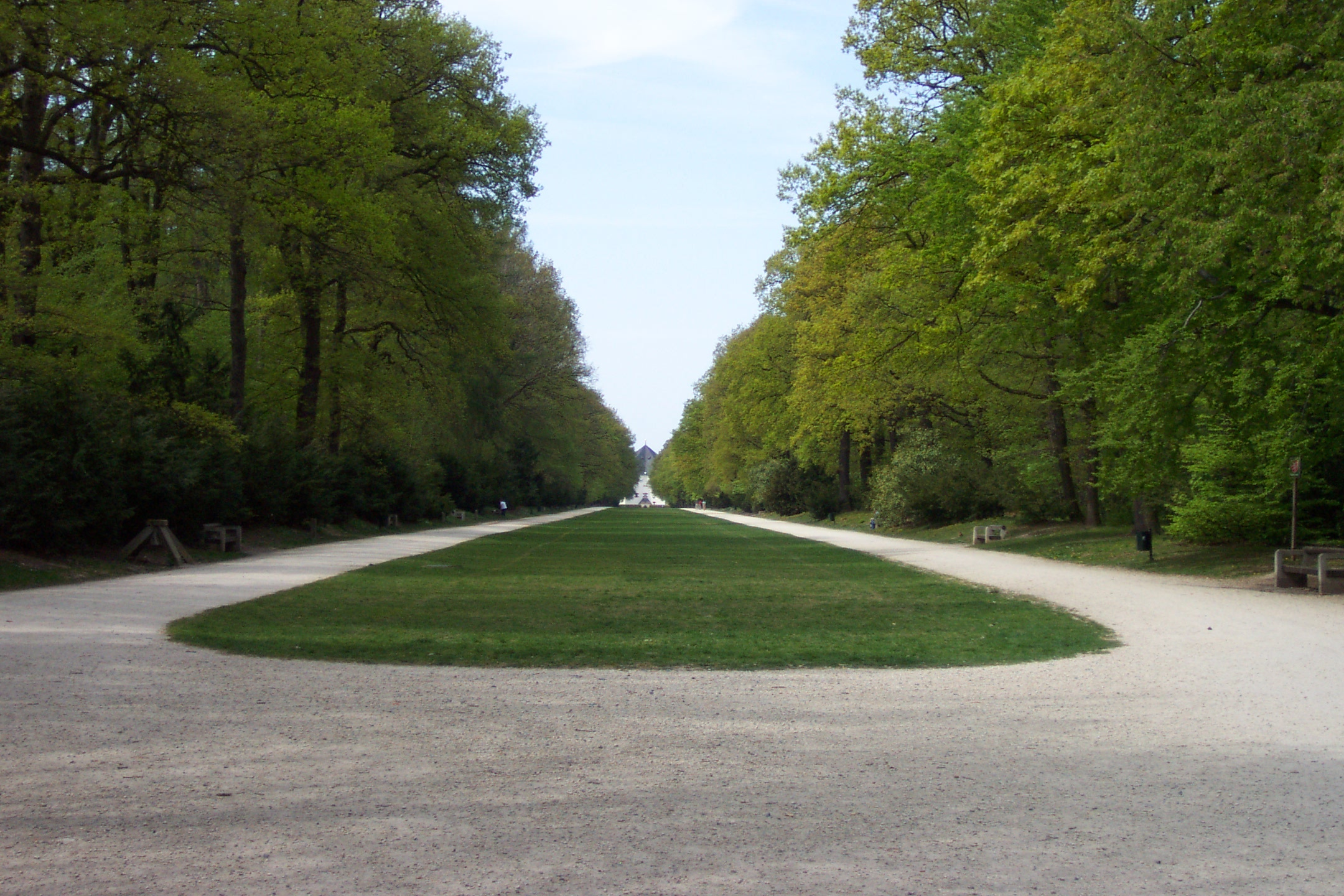
Main alley, a popular jogging site for inhabitants of Prague 6

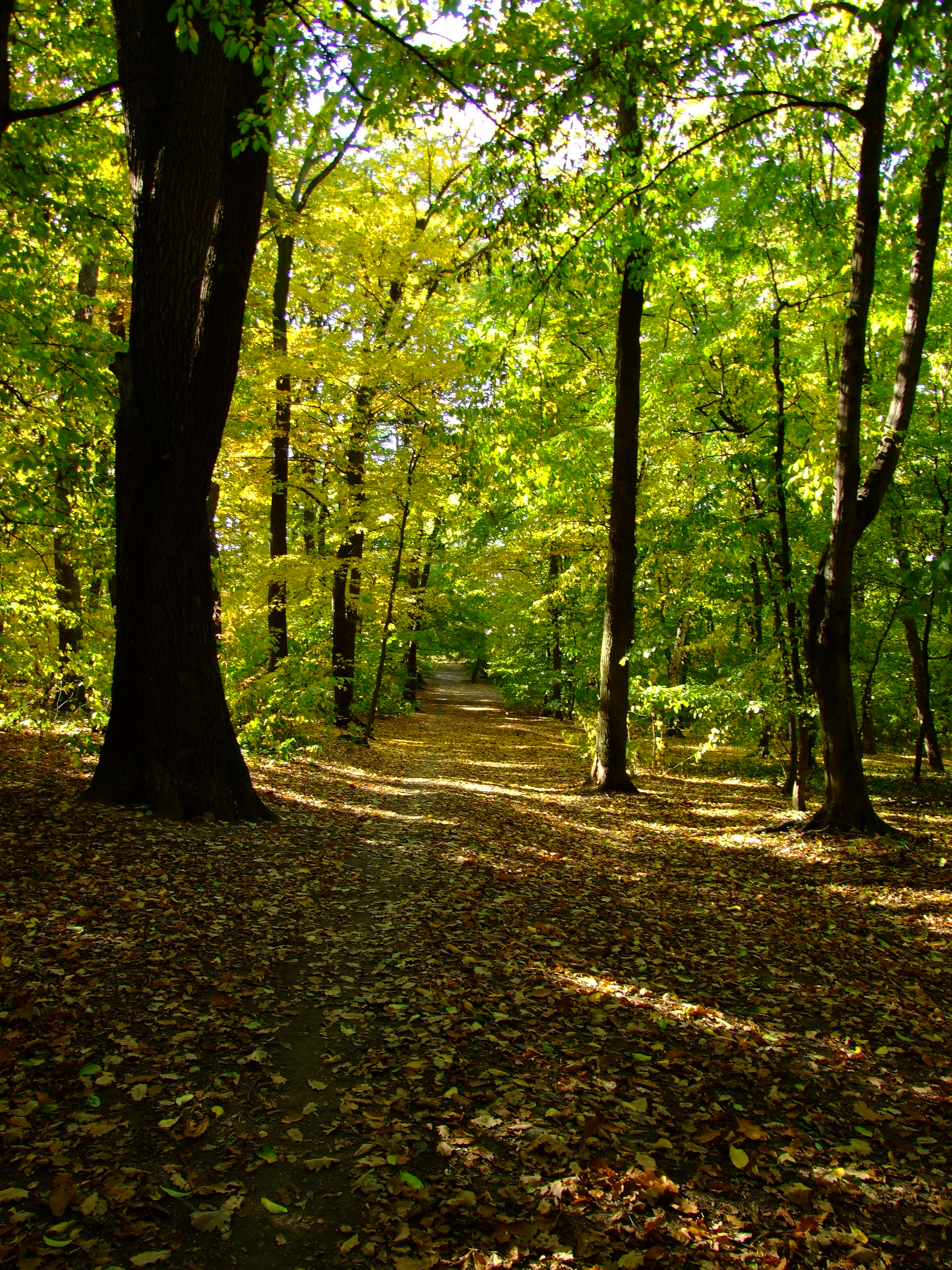
One of many forest paths

Obora Hvězda (Star Game Reserve) is a 84 hectares (210 acres) forest park (formerly a royal game reserve) in Prague, the capital of the Czech Republic, which is now protected as a natural monument. It is located about 6 kilometres (3.7 mi) west of the city centre, surrounded by the neighbourhoods of Liboc (N), Břevnov (E), Bílá Hora (SW) and Ruzyně (W).

The first mention of the forest, originally called Malejov, dates from 993, when duke Boleslaus II donated it to the newly established Břevnov Monastery. It was transformed into a walled game reserve during rule of Ferdinand I in the mid-16th century. The current name (hvězda being Czech for "star") derives from the Star Summer Palace, a 16th-century building, which stands in middle of the forest. The Battle of White Mountain took place on fields in the W/SW vicinity of the game reserve in 1620.

Nowadays part of the site is designated as a Natura 2000 protected site due to the presence of the narrow-mouthed whorl snail (Vertigo angustior).

The site is home to several bird species including the Middle Spotted Woodpecker.
