= Střešovice =

- Cadastral Area of Prague
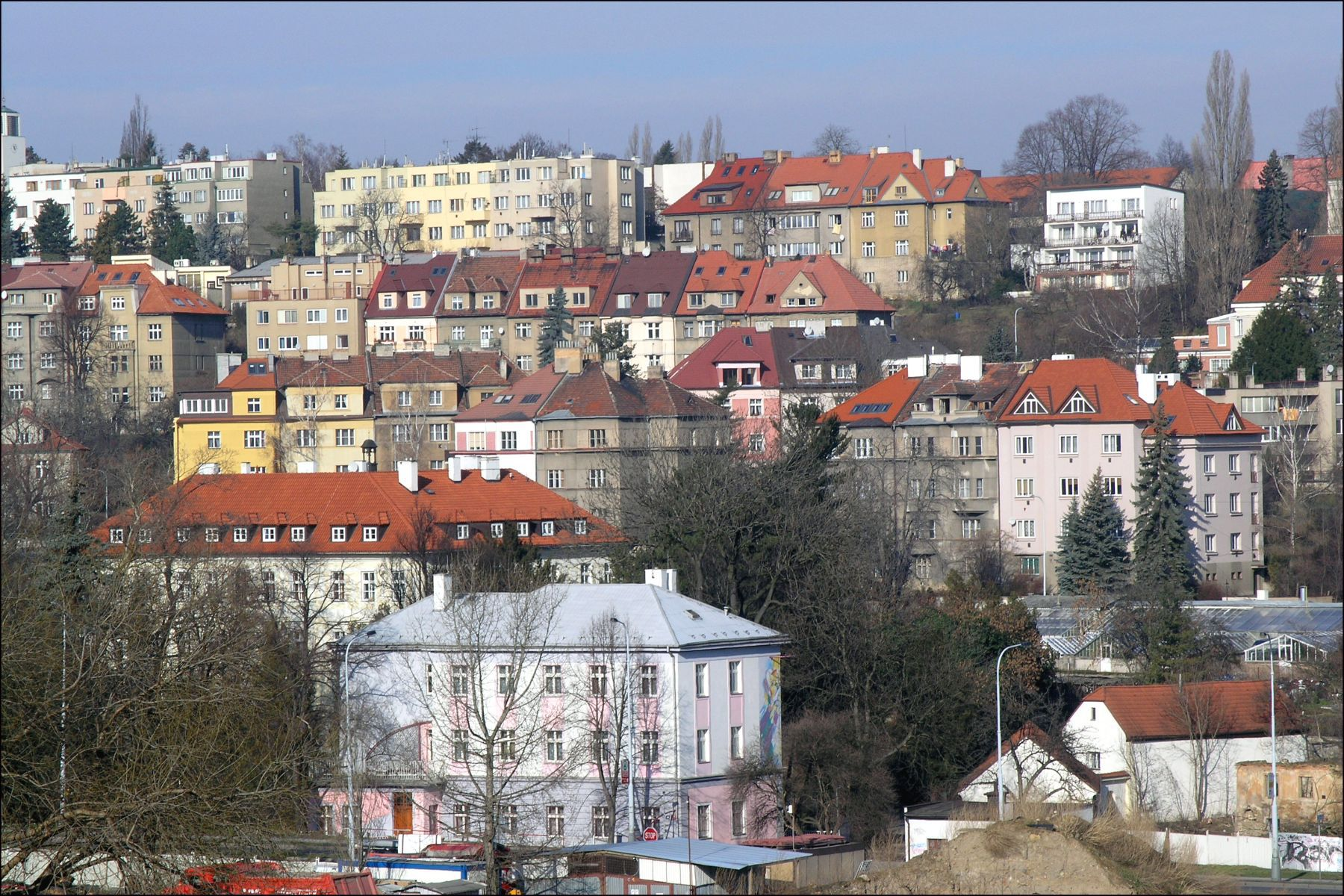
- View of Střešovice from Břevnov

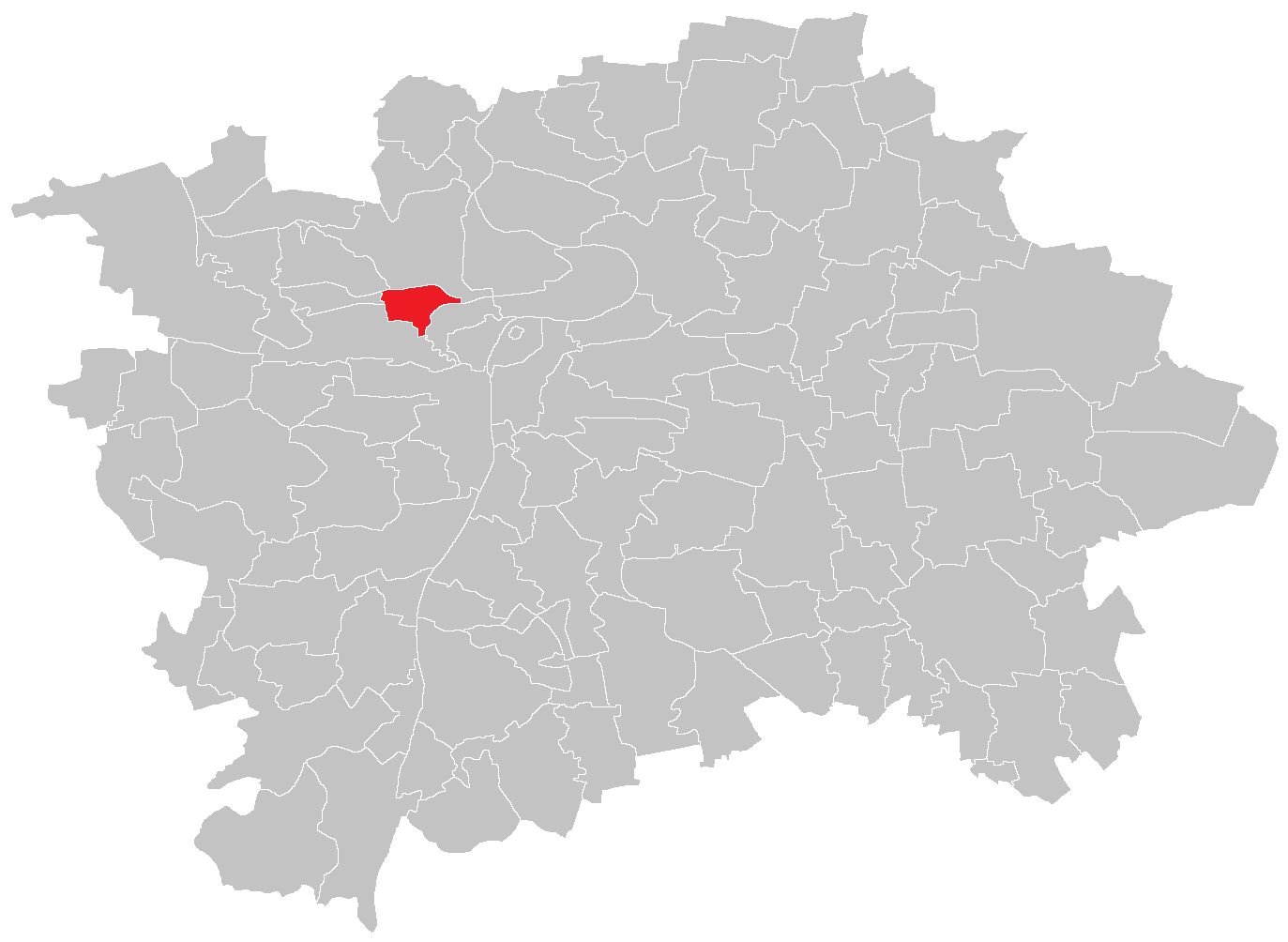
- Location of Střešovice in Prague
- Coordinates: 50°05′34″N 14°22′48″E
- Country: Czech Republic
- Region: Prague
- District: Prague 6

Area
  - Total: 1.55 km^{2} (0.60 sq mi)

Population (2021)
  - Total: 6,592
  - Density: 4,250/km^{2} (11,000/sq mi)
- Time zone: UTC+1 (CET)
  - Summer (DST): UTC+2 (CEST)
- Postal code: 160 00, 162 00, 169 00

Střešovice is a cadastral area in the west of Prague, located in the Prague 6 district. Střešovice is often called the "local Beverly Hills" because it has been home to some famous residents, including Czech President Václav Havel. The neighborhood is made up of green, quiet, village-like streets and is a 10-minute walk from Prague Castle, and the Dejvice district. The major sights include Villa Müller by functionalist architect Adolf Loos (1930) and The Church of St Norbert in Romanesque Revival (1890-1891) style.

== History ==
Střešovice (also known as Třešovice) appeared between the 10th and 11th centuries, and belonged to the Czech royal family until 1143, when the village was given to the Strahov Monastery. It remained in possession of the monastery until the 20th century.

By 1900 Střešovice had 2,500 habitats. In 1922, the number of dwellers grew to 3,879, and 254 houses connected to Prague as a part of the Prague-8 district. In 1949, the united part of Střešovice was integrated with the Prague 5 district, (with Břevnov and parts of Liboc). Another part was integrated into Prague 6 (with Dejvice, Sedlec, Veleslavín, Vokovice and parts of Bubeneč, Holešovice, Hradčany and Liboc). In 1960, almost the whole of Střešovice became part of a new district, Prague 6. In 1990 the Střešovice became a part of the current Prague 6 administrative district.

== Demographics ==
Historical population

Year	Pop.	±%
1869	1,795	—
1880	2,262	+26.0%
1890	2,551	+12.8%
1900	2,525	−1.0%
1910	2,862	+13.3%
1921	3,663	+28.0%
1930	8,022	+119.0%
1950	11,244	+40.2%

Year	Pop.	±%
1961	13,043	+16.0%
1970	11,356	−12.9%
1980	9,595	−15.5%
1991	7,859	−18.1%
2001	6,918	−12.0%
2011	7,001	+1.2%
2021	6,592	−5.8%

Source: Censuses

== Transportation ==
The neighborhood served by tram routes 1 and 2 or bus routes 108, 216 and partially 180. The closest metro stations are Hradčanská and Dejvická. Ruzyně International Airport is located approximately 7 kilometers west of Střešovice.

The Prague Public Transport Museum permanent exhibition is located in tram depot Střešovice. It contains over 40 vehicles from the history of Prague public transport and many other exhibits.

== Gallery ==
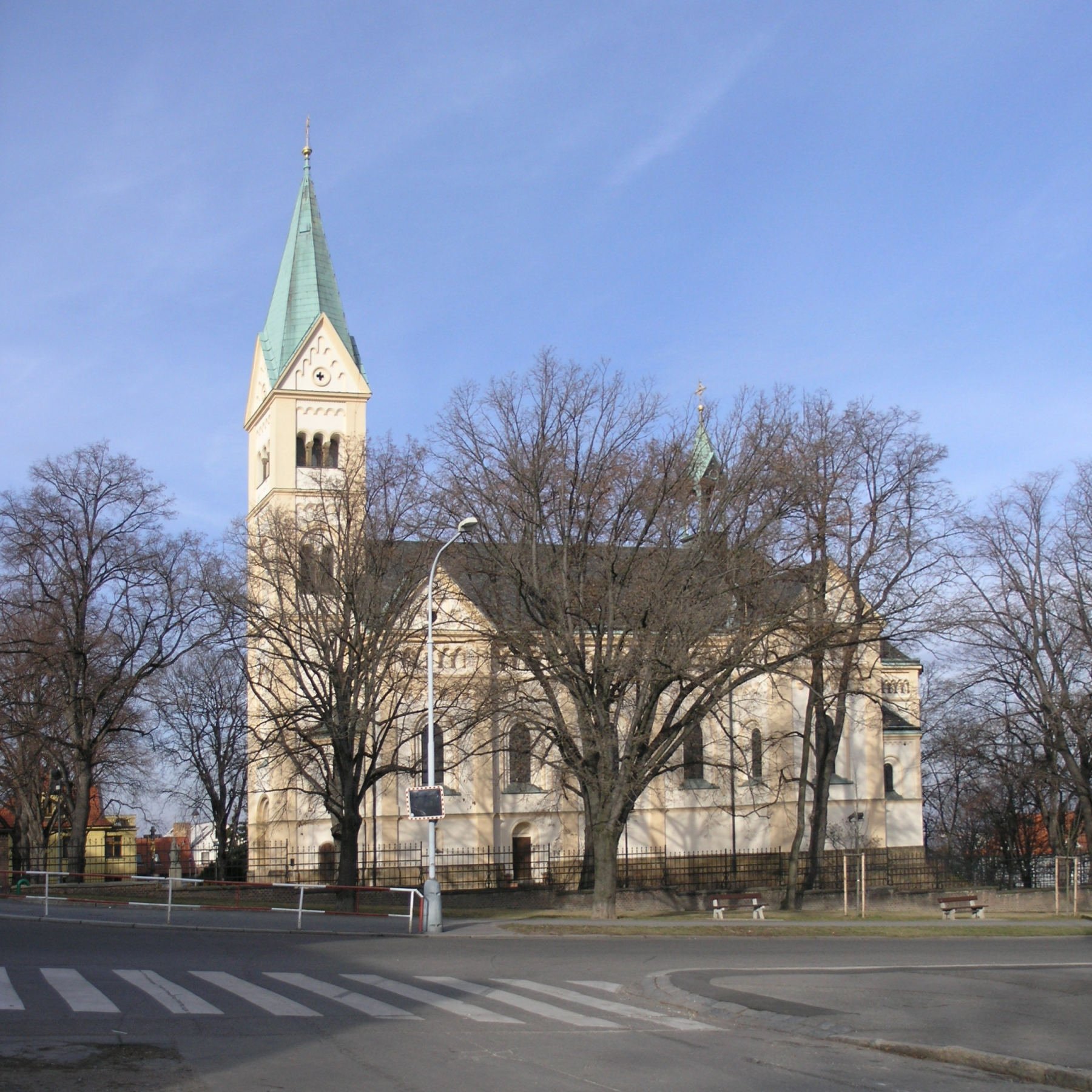
The Church of St Norbert

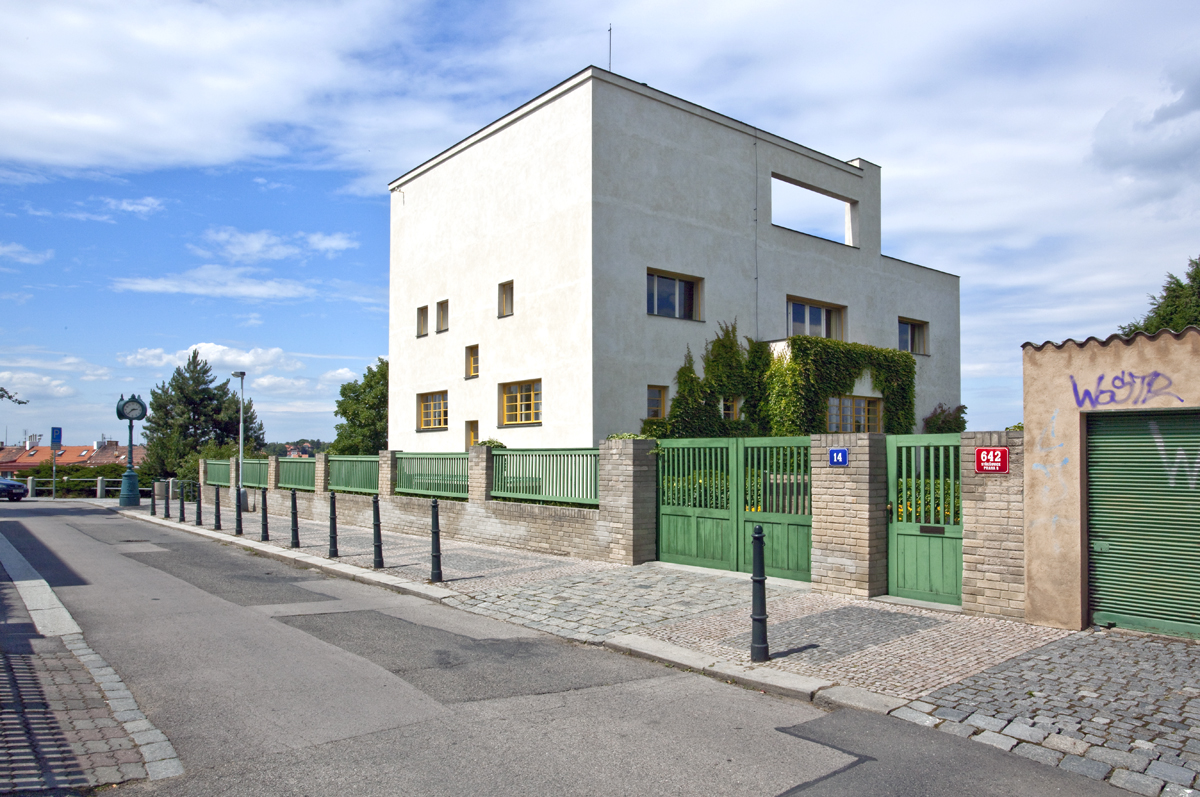
Villa Müller by Adolf Loos

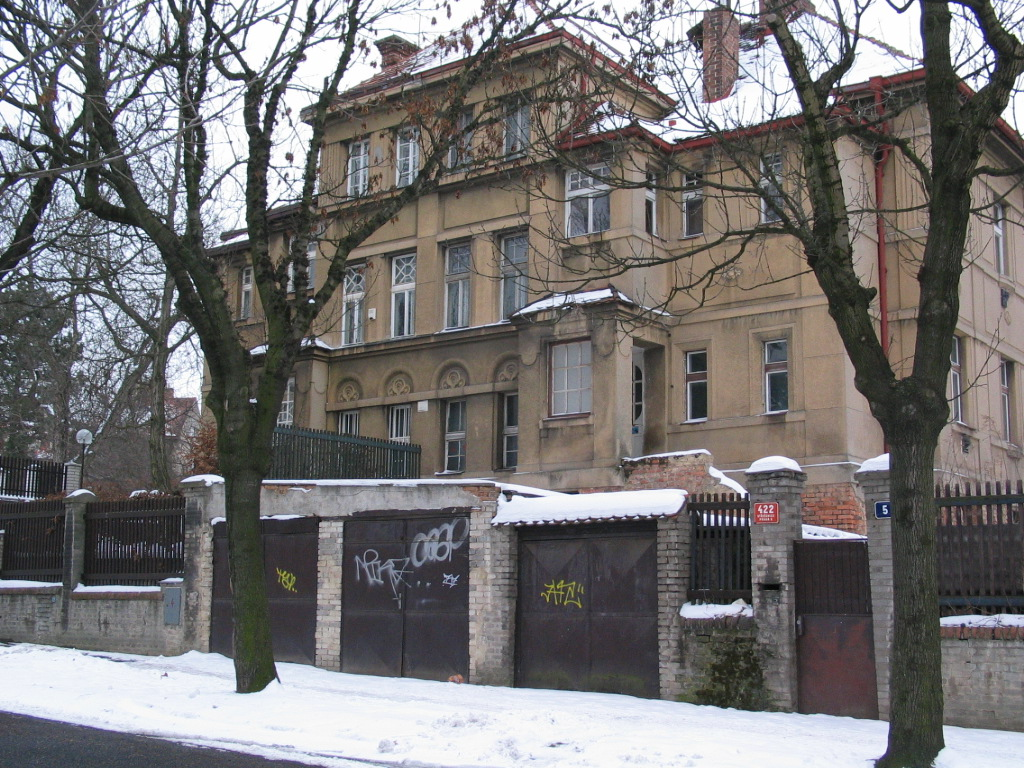
The dwelling house in Střešovice

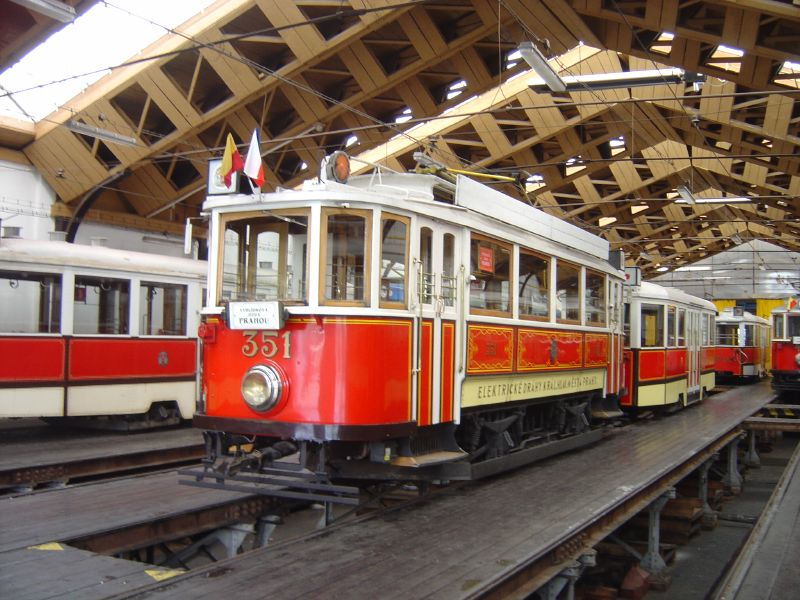
Public Transport Museum in tram depot Střešovice
