= Letohrádek Hvězda =

- Letohrádek Hvězda
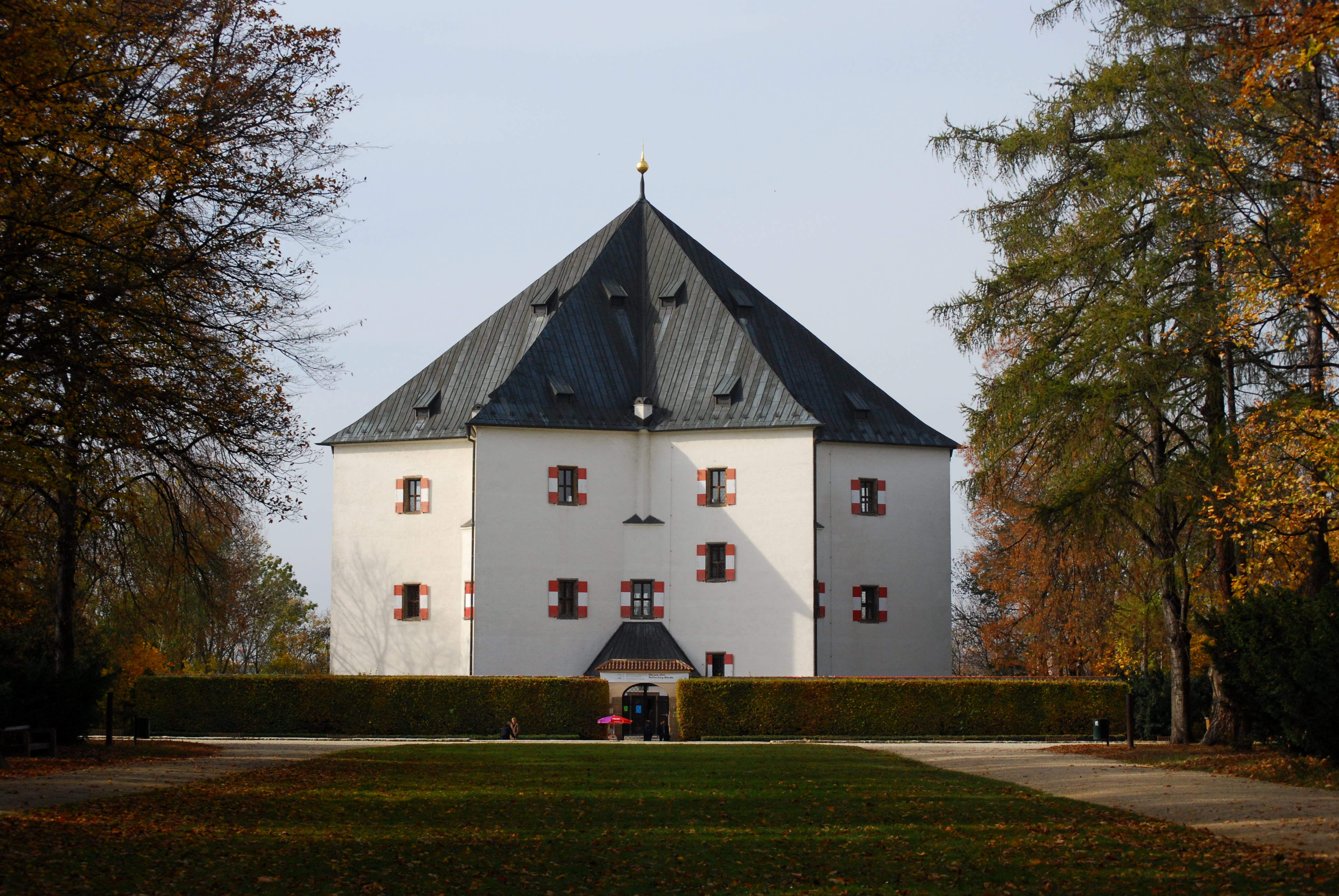
- Interactive map of the Letohrádek Hvězda area

General information
- Location: Liboc, Prague 6, Czech Republic
- Coordinates: 50.0834°N 14.3263°E
- Completed: 1556

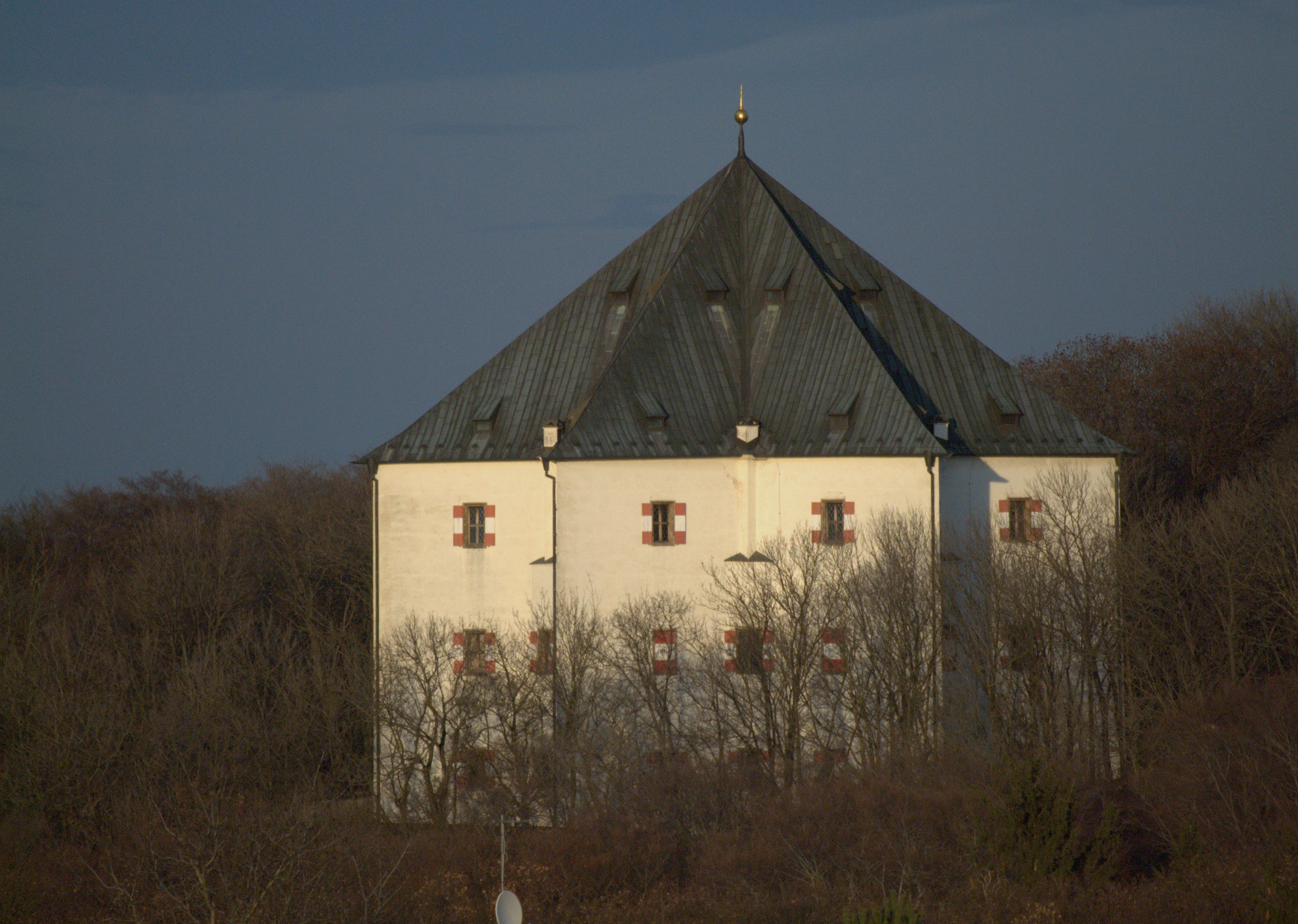
View of the villa from Bílá Hora

Letohrádek Hvězda (Czech pronunciation: [ˈlɛtoɦraːdɛk ˈɦvjɛzda], translating into English as "Star Villa" or "Star Summer Palace") is a Renaissance villa in Prague in the Czech Republic. It is situated in the game reserve of the same name in the Liboc district of Prague 6, about 7 km (4 mi) west of Prague city centre.

== History ==
The surrounding game reserve was founded in 1530 by King Ferdinand I. Twenty-five years later he commissioned his younger son Ferdinand II, Archduke of Austria, to build the villa. The foundations were laid on 27 June 1555 by the Archduke alone, and construction of the villa was completed three years later. The villa is shaped as a six-pointed star, from which it and the game reserve acquire their shared name.

== Present ==
Since 1962, the area (which comprises the game reserve with the villa and the battlefield of the Battle of White Mountain, which took place nearby) has been protected as one national cultural monument. In the basement of the publicly accessible villa there is a model of the Battle of White Mountain. Various cultural and social events, exhibitions and concerts are organized in the villa.
