= Antonín Engel =

Czech architect (1879–1958)

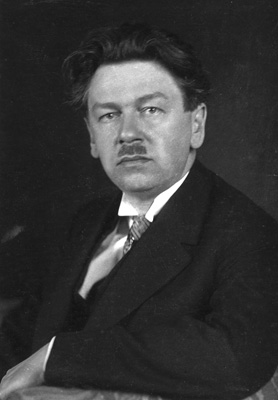
Antonín Engel

Antonín Engel (4 May 1879 – 12 October 1958) was a Czech architect, urban planner and architectural theorist. His most known works are the Prague Waterworks building in Podolí, the Ministry of Railways and Ministry of Defense buildings and the urban conception of the Prague quarter, Dejvice. He is considered the last master of neo-Renaissance and neo-classicism in Czech culture.

== Life ==
Born on 4 May 1879 in Poděbrady to the sugar producer Augustin Engel. Soon after birth, the family moved to Prague. In 1897 he graduated from the Imperial Czech High School in Malá Strana. He furthered his education in architecture and structural engineering at the Czech Technical University in Prague with Jan Koula (1897–1903) and completed three semesters at the German University of Technology with Josef Zítek (1901–1903). In 1903, he was appraised for his work by the Prague City Hall which led to him touring Germany and Belgium. Between 1905 and 1908, he continued his studies with Otto Wagner at the Vienna Academy, where his urban planning project of the Prague district Letná won the Rome Prize and led to a scholarship in Italy.

Engel opened his own studio in Prague in 1909. From 1912 to 1921 he was professor at the Prague School of Construction Engineering. In 1922 he became a professor at the Czech Technical University in Prague, eventually serving as its rector from 1939 to 1940. His most active period was during the 1920s (in the era of the independent Czechoslovak Republic which chose Prague as its capital), when he contributed significantly to the urban development of the city as a member of the State Regulatory Commission and was very active in publishing.

In 2002, the Government of the Czech Republic named Engel an Honorary Citizen of Prague 6.
