= Dejvice =

Neighborhood in Prague, Czechia

- Cadastral Area of Prague
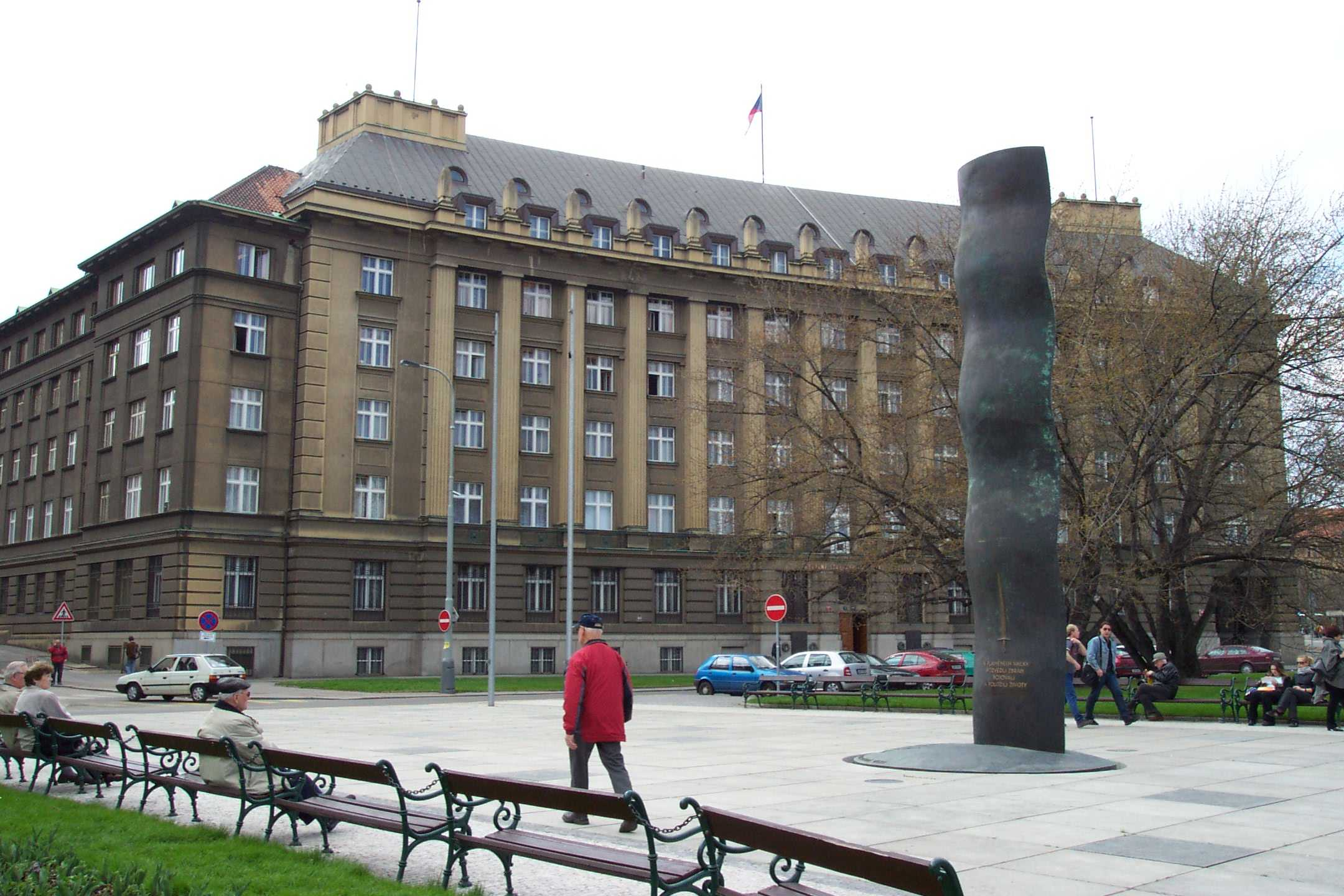
- Building of the General Staff of the Czech Army

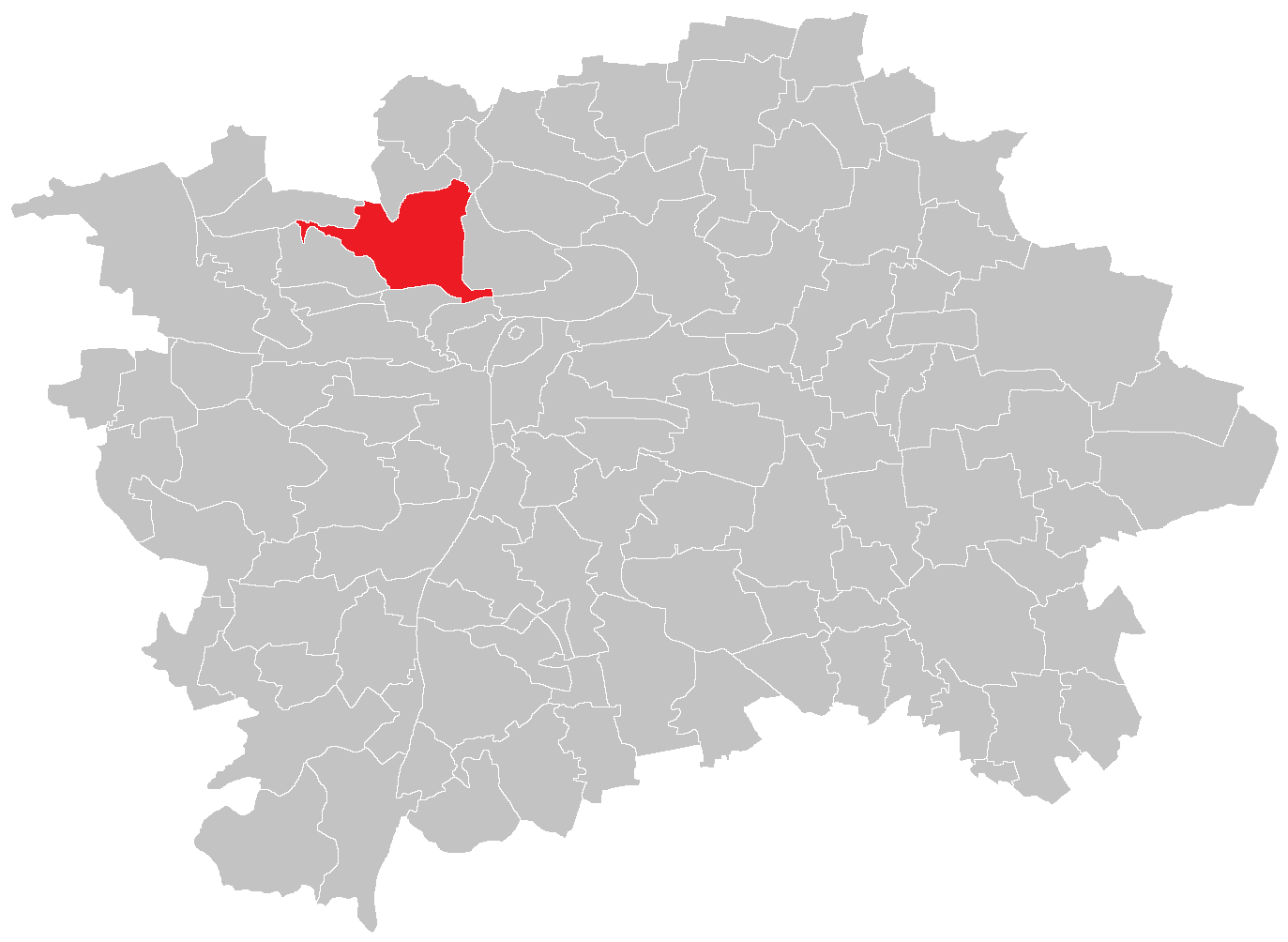
- Location of Dejvice in Prague
- Coordinates: 50°06′22″N 14°22′13″E
- Country: Czech Republic
- Region: Prague
- District: Prague 6

Area
  - Total: 7.39 km^{2} (2.85 sq mi)

Population (2021)
  - Total: 23,401
  - Density: 3,170/km^{2} (8,200/sq mi)
- Time zone: UTC+1 (CET)
  - Summer (DST): UTC+2 (CEST)

Dejvice is a historical community, a municipal quarter of the Prague 6 district of Prague, Czech Republic. Its history can be traced back to the late Roman era. Dejvice is known for its appeal to the upper middle class, foreign diplomatic corps and as a university district. It is also home to Dukla Prague, one of the most successful football clubs of the Czechoslovak era.

== History ==
While it is difficult to pinpoint the exact time in which area of Dejvice was first settled, archeologists uncovered a pit that dates back to the late Roman Era, and also an almost 3,00-year old cottage from the early Iron Age. Other than this not much is known until the 10th century when Dejvice, and other towns in the current Prague 6 municipality, came under the auspices of the Břevnov Monastery.

The history of modern Dejvice begins in the 1920s. During this time the city was an affluent neighborhood of Prague. Orchards were planted on the surrounding hills. Václav Havel lived in Dejvice during this time. The tram line was established and incorporated with a trolleybus by the Second World War. The build up of the quarter also continued. From the Victory Square it sequentially shifted to the North to Podbaba neighborhood.

After the war, the Hotel International Prague (1950) was completed and was intended to mimic the architecture of Moscow. After the fall of communism in 1989, it was renamed the "Hotel Crowne Plaza".

The town surrounds a square titled, Vítězné náměstí (Victory Square) which was built in 1925 as the focus of a new residential part of the city. In 1978 the metro line was extended to this square with the Dejvická station (named Leninova at the time). Today's major road into Dejvická from the west, called Evropská, also appeared in 1978 and was called Leninova when it was built, reflecting the Soviet presence. Leninova (today's Europska) united the airport with the center of Prague, and that newly expanded neighborhood, by a sequence of primary streets.

== Character of the quarter ==
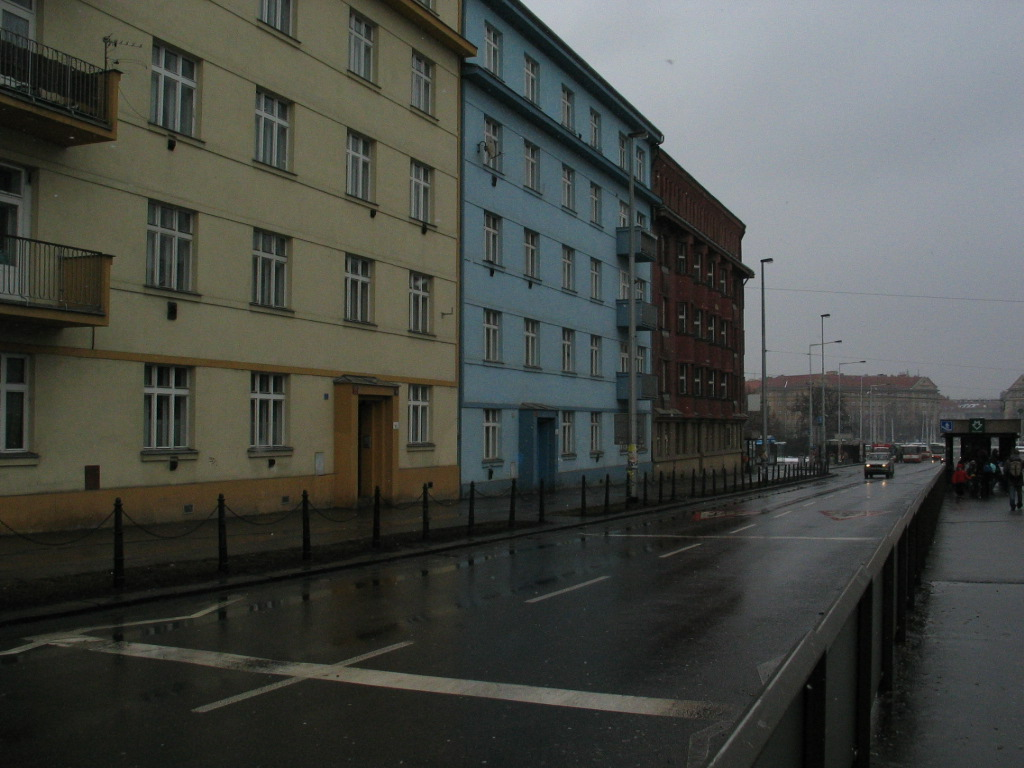
Dwelling houses in Dejvice

The architecture of Dejvice was greatly influenced by Czech architect Antonín Engel during the 1920s, when he developed new housing settlements that still stand today. Dejvice is a relatively luxurious residential quarter, catering to the educated elite.

Dejvice is a home to multiple universities with many students. It is home to the main campus of Czech Technical University, University of Chemistry and Technology, newly built Czech National Library of Technology, as well as Catholic Theological Faculty of Charles University.

== Demographics ==
Historical population

Year	Pop.	±%
1869	1,864	—
1880	2,622	+40.7%
1890	4,394	+67.6%
1900	5,098	+16.0%
1910	6,582	+29.1%

Year	Pop.	±%
1921	10,398	+58.0%
1930	24,180	+132.5%
1950	31,285	+29.4%
1961	36,318	+16.1%
1970	34,226	−5.8%

Year	Pop.	±%
1980	30,124	−12.0%
1991	26,121	−13.3%
2001	23,211	−11.1%
2011	24,020	+3.5%
2021	23,401	−2.6%

Source: Censuses

== Hanspaulka league ==
The Hanspaulka League, which was the most popular amateur football league in Czechoslovakia, originated in Dejvice. It began in 1972 with eight teams. The league has now grown to over 790 teams. The league is broken into eight divisions based on skill and quality of play. Each game features six players per side and are played on small pitches. The league began four years after the Soviet suppression of the Prague Spring as a means of self-determination for the Czechs. It was staffed by many of the intellectuals and students who participated in the 1968 events.

== Transport ==
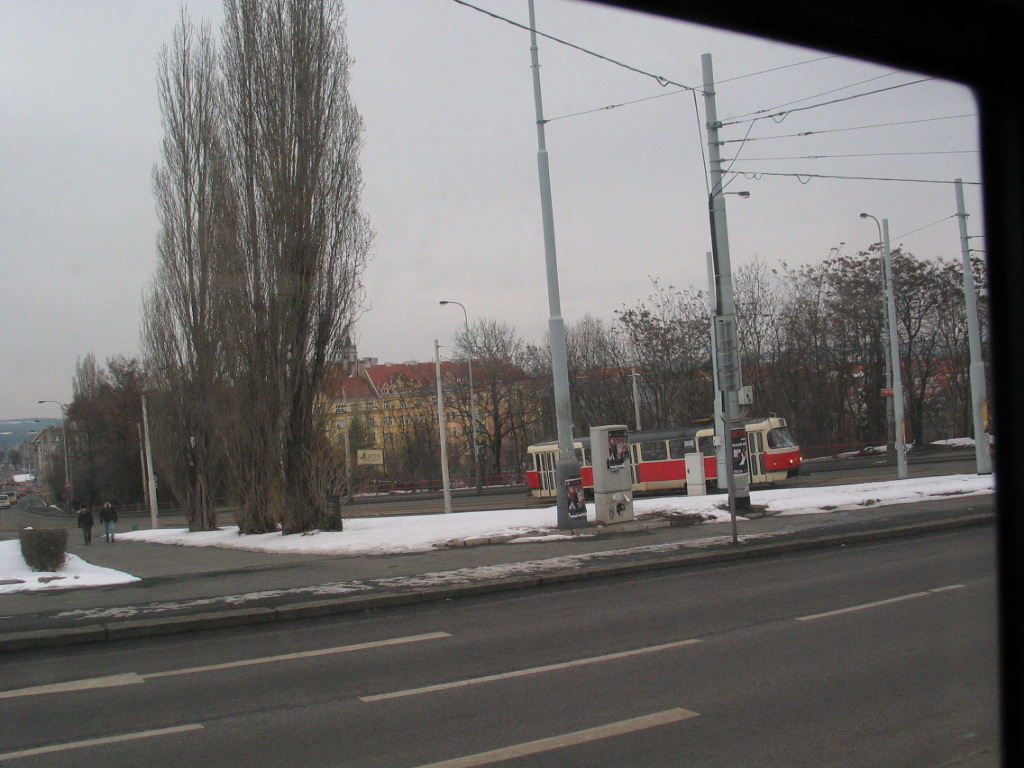
Tram from Dejvice to the center

Dejvice is linked with the center of Prague by tram lines (8, 18, 20, 26). The metro line A stop's in Dejvice at the Dejvická metro station, and gets to the heart of the city in minutes.

== See also ==
- Hanspaulská liga (Hanspaulka league)

== Notes ==
- Kohout, Michal; Slapeta, Vladimir; Templ, Stephan (1999). Prague-20th century architecture. Wien, Austria: Springer-Verlag Wien New York. ISBN 3-211-83229-7.
- McRae, Robert Grant (1997). Resistance and Revolution. Ontario, Canada: Calreton University Press. ISBN 0-88629-316-2.
