= Prague Public Transport Museum =

Museum in Prague

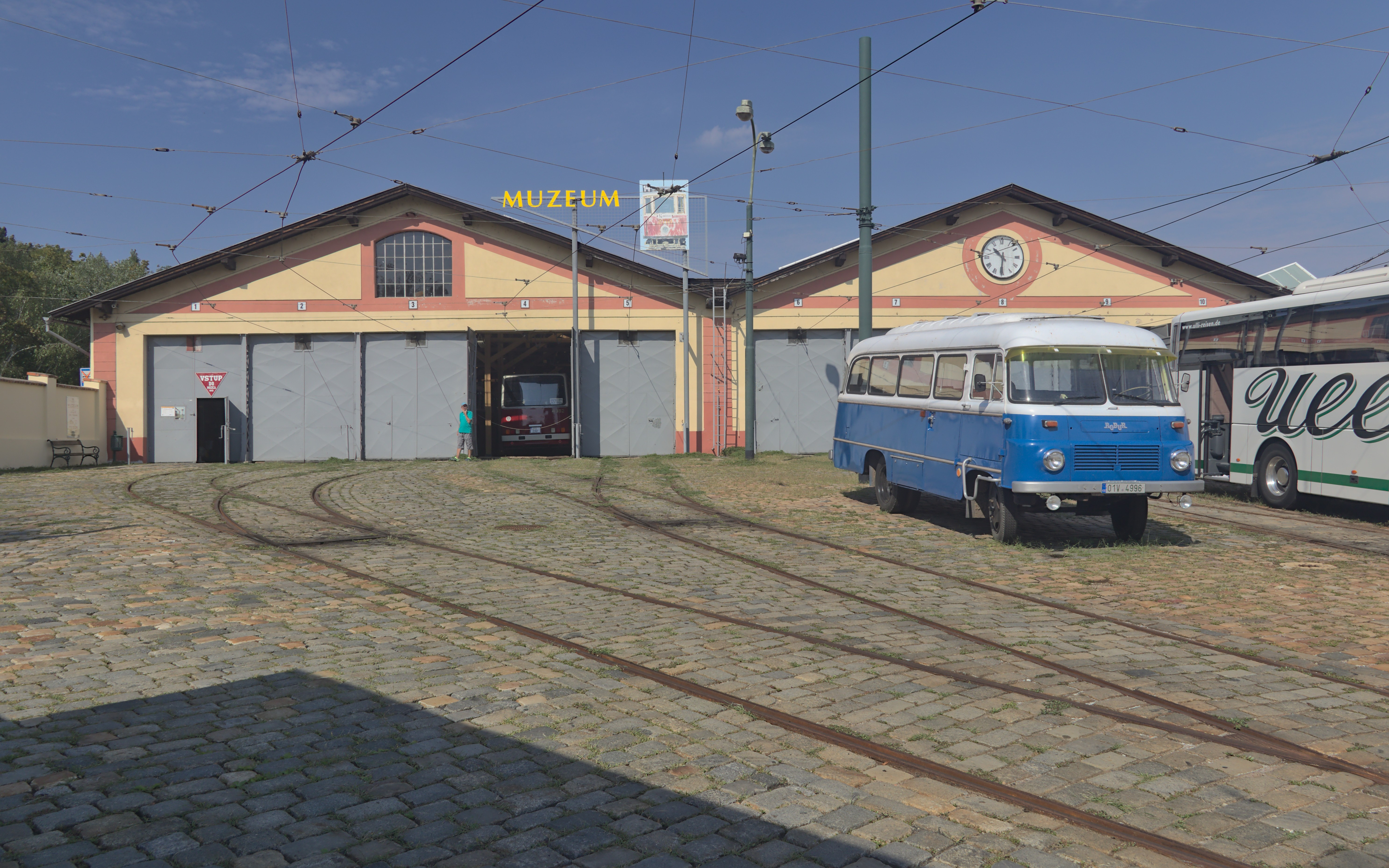
- Entrance to the museum
- Established: 1993
- Location: Patočkova 4, Prague-Střešovice, Czech Republic
- Coordinates: 50°5′39.21″N 14°23′19.53″E
- Type: Transport museum
- Website: muzeum.dpp.cz

The Prague Public Transport Museum (Czech: Muzeum městské hromadné dopravy v Praze) is a transport museum in Prague, Czech Republic. Located in a former tram depot, the museum was founded in 1993, although the depot was built in 1909. The museum celebrated 30 years in 2023, at which point it had received a total of over 511,000 visitors. The museum added a 1932 tram to its collection in 2014, notable for having tinted windows.
