= Břevnov Monastery Brewery =

Czech brewery

- Company type: akciová společnost
- Industry: Alcoholic beverage
- Founded: 993
- Headquarters: Břevnov, Czech Republic
- Products: Beer
- Production output: 3,000 hl
- Website: brevnovskypivovar.cz/

The Břevnov Monastery Brewery (cs: Břevnovský klášterní pivovar, longform: St. Adalbert Břevnov Monastery Brewery) follows up on the oldest documented brewery in the Czech Republic, the Břevnov Monastery including its brewery was founded in 993. The production of beer has been interrupted several times in history and finally restored in 2011. The beer is filled directly in the brewery into glass or PET bottles and barrels. Břevnovský Benedict is also brewed in the restaurant directly on the premises of monastery and in a number of other Czech restaurants.

== History ==
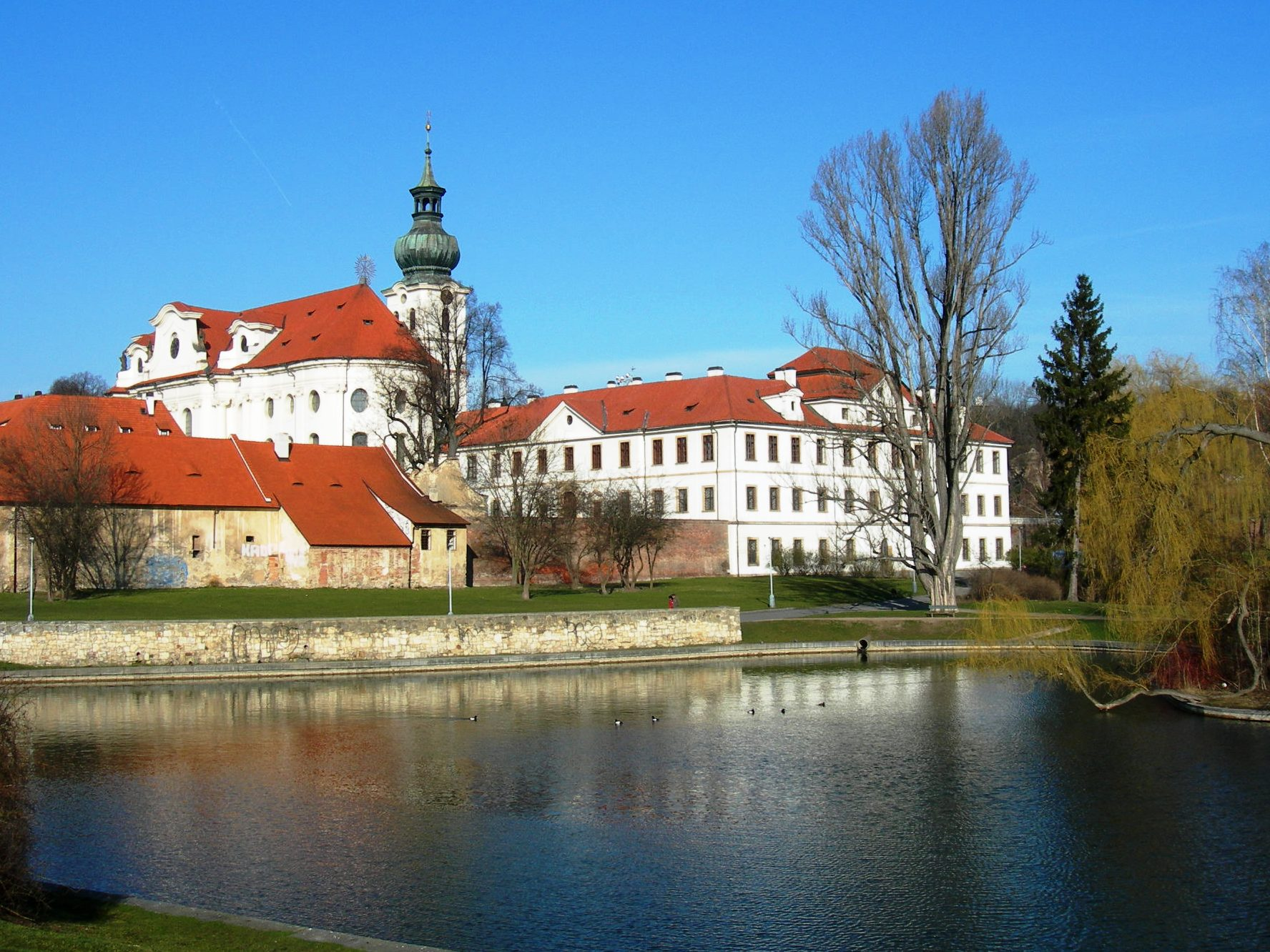
Břevnov Monastery

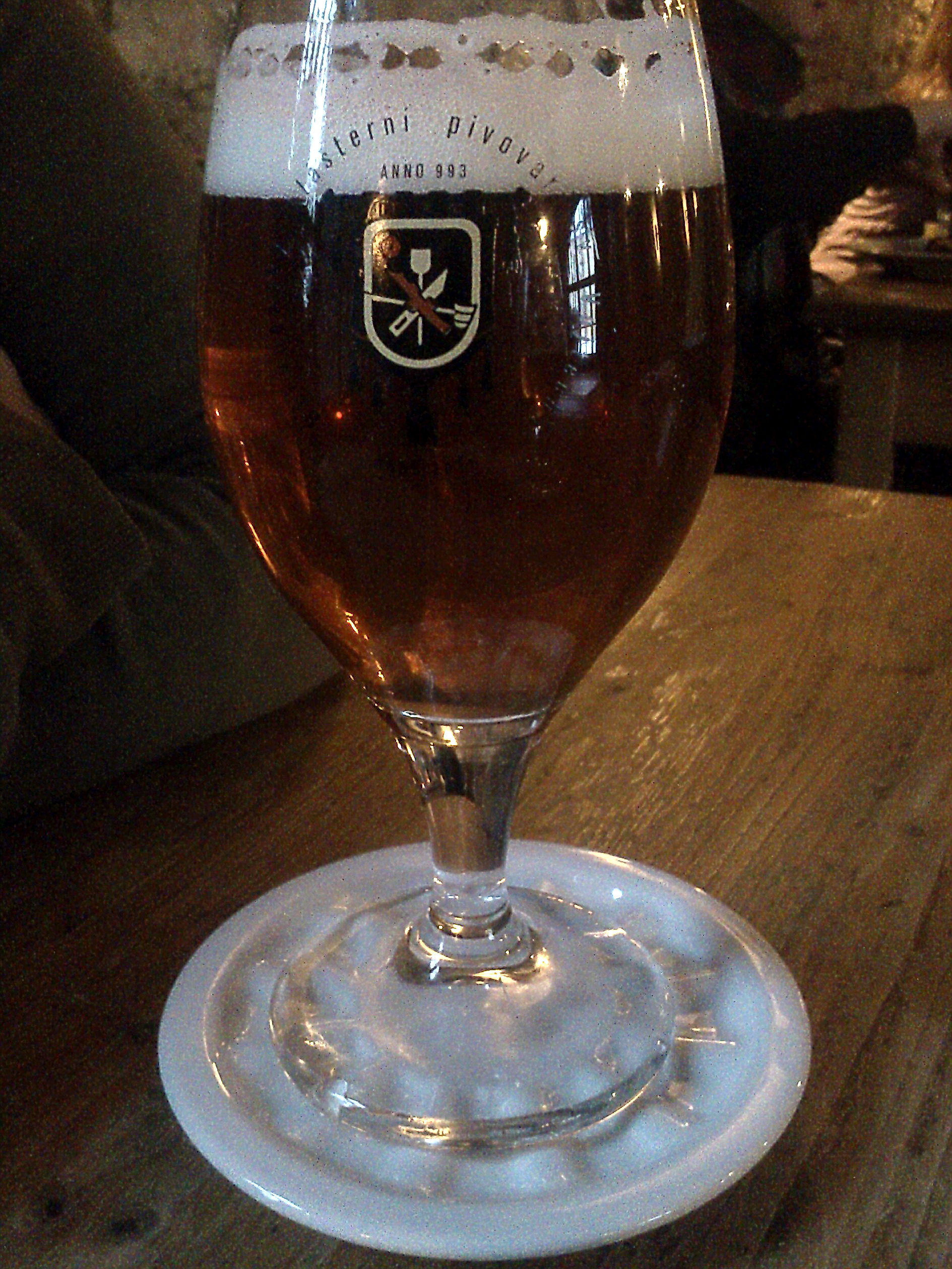
Břevnovský Benedict Imperial Lager 20°

Břevnov Monastery was founded by the Prague Bishop St. Adalbert and Boleslaus II, Duke of Bohemia in 993. The brewery was established as part of its economic background. During the Hussite wars, the entire monastery, including the brewery, was almost destroyed and, according to the monastery chronicle, a new brewery was built in 1720. Kilián Ignác Dientzenhofer was particularly involved in the renovation and repairs, and the annual production of beer reached 5,000 hl. Beer production ended in 1889, mainly due to the lack of capacity of the cellar, and the building was demolished when nearby Patočkova street was expanded in 1953. The St. Adalbert Břevnov Monastic Brewery was founded on the tradition of beer production in 2011 and the brewery was located in the baroque building of the former stables.

Since 2016, beer brewed according to the same recipe and under the supervision of the Břevnov Monastery brewery technologists is produced in the South Korean city Busan under the brand Praha 993.

== Brands ==
- Břevnovský Benedict Světlý ležák – 12° (5%) pale lager
- Břevnovský Benedict Tmavý ležák – 11° (4.5%) dark lager
- Břevnovský Benedict Pšeničný – 11° (4.2%) wheat beer
- Břevnovský Benedict Klášterní IPA – 15° (6.5%) ale beer
- Břevnovský Benedict Břevnovské Abbey – 17° (7.1%) dark ale beer
- Břevnovský Benedict Imperial Lager – 20° (8.5%) pale lager
- Břevnovský Benedict Russian Imperial Stout – 21° (8.5%) stout beer
- Břevnovský Benedict Pšeničný Bock – 16° (6.6%) wheat bock
- Praha 993 Pale Lager – 4.5% ABV, brewed only in South Korea
- Praha 993 Wit – 4.7% ABV wheat beer, brewed only in South Korea
- Praha 993 Stout – 4.8% ABV, brewed only in South Korea
- Praha 993 IPA – 6% ABV, brewed only in South Korea

== See also ==
- Beer in the Czech Republic
