= Prague 6 =

District of Prague, Czechia

Prague 6 Praha 6
- Municipal District of Prague; Administrative District of Prague
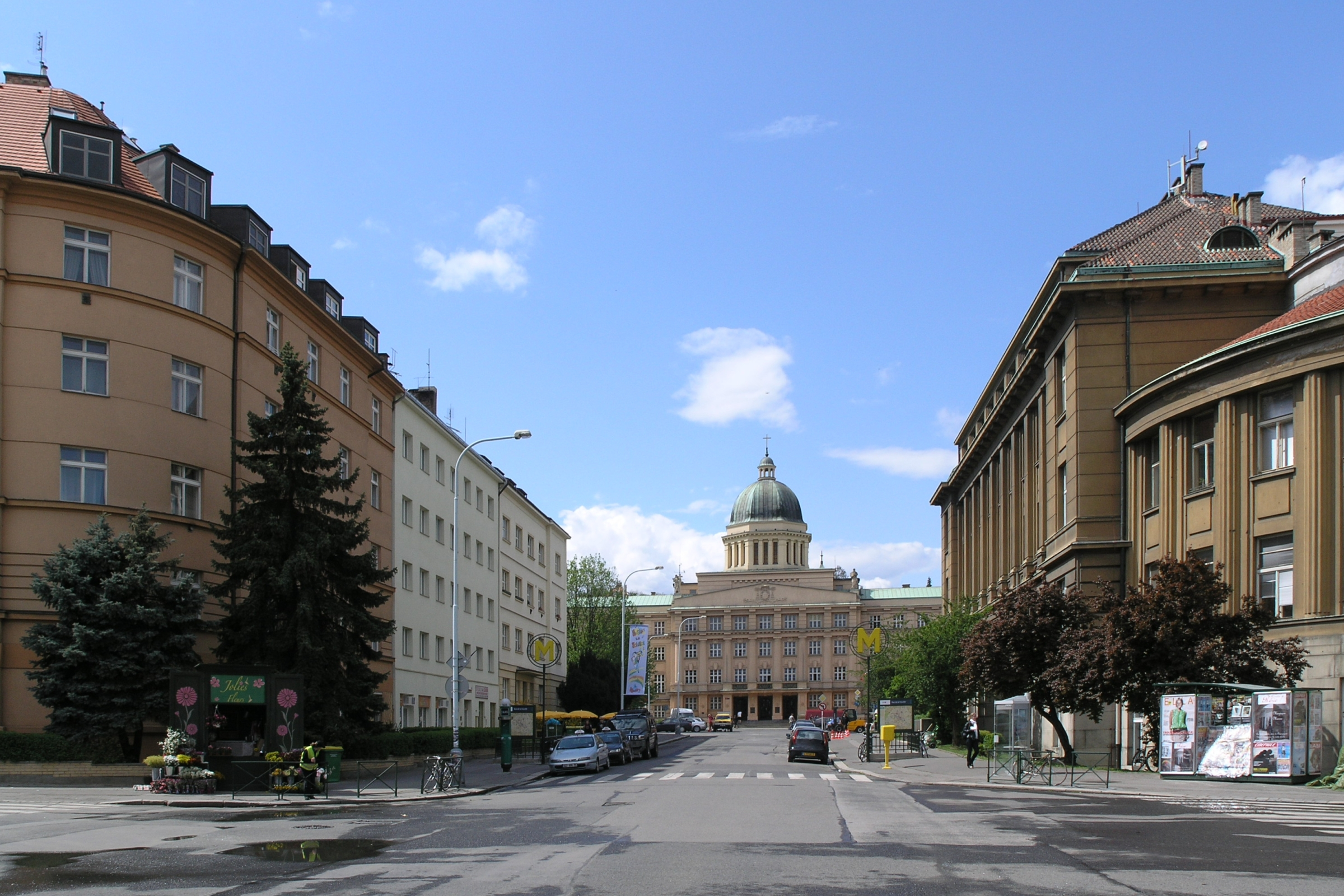
- Zikova street, Prague 6

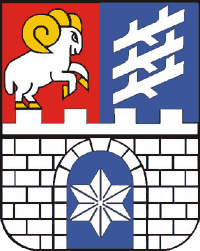
- Flag Coat of arms

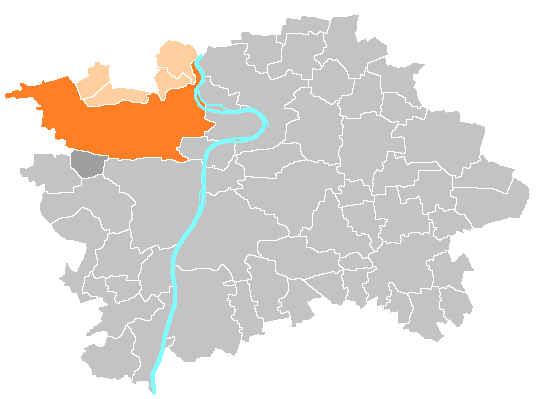
- Location of Prague 6 in Prague
- Coordinates: 50°6′3″N 14°23′41″E
- Country: Czech Republic
- Region: Prague

Government
  - Mayor: Jakub Stárek

Area
  - Total: 41.54 km^{2} (16.04 sq mi)

Population (2021)
  - Total: 103,254
  - Density: 2,486/km^{2} (6,438/sq mi)
- Time zone: UTC+1 (CET)
  - Summer (DST): UTC+2 (CEST)
- Postal code: 160 00
- Website: https://www.praha6.cz

Prague 6, officially known as the Municipal District of Prague 6 (Městská část Praha 6), is the largest district in Prague. Located in the northwest, it covers 41.54 km^{2} and had a population of 100,600 as of 31 December 2008.

The administrative district (správní obvod) of the same name includes Prague 6 as well as the municipal districts of Lysolaje, Nebušice, Přední Kopanina, and Suchdol.

Prague 6 encompasses the cadastral areas of Ruzyně, Liboc, Veleslavín, Vokovice, Dejvice, and Střešovice, as well as parts of the cadastral areas of Břevnov, Sedlec, Bubeneč, and Hradčany.

The district contains several notable sites, such as the Břevnov Monastery, and cultural institutions like Semafor and Divadlo Spejbla a Hurvínka. It also includes the Baba district and the Hvězda Game Reserve, which covers an area of 86 hectares and features many chateaux. Additionally, the Václav Havel Airport, the largest airport in the Czech Republic, is located in this district.

Jakub Stárek from ODS has been the mayor of the Municipal District of Prague 6 since 2022.

== Strahov ==
Strahov is characterized by an aging sports stadium and ongoing construction work. It is particularly popular among students, with their "town" consisting of ten large dormitory blocks that house young people from around the world. The area also features several classic student pubs, restaurants, and nightclubs. A notable landmark in Strahov is the Strahov Monastery.

== Břevnov ==
Břevnov is home to medical students and the Kajetánka University Residence. However, it is also considered a prestigious area in Prague. This is why the current Czech President, along with all his predecessors, resides here. Additionally, the poet and Nobel Laureate in Literature, Jaroslav Seifert, lived in Břevnov. A significant landmark in the area is the Břevnov Monastery.

== Dejvice ==
Dejvice is home to many technically oriented faculties of Charles University, including Engineering, Civil Engineering, and Chemistry. It is a popular residential area among affluent Prague families and foreigners, particularly Americans. Notable sights include the National Technical Library, Vítězné náměstí (Victory Square) — the central square of Dejvice — and the Stalinist-style Hotel International Prague.

== Střešovice ==
One of the most expensive areas in Prague in terms of rental prices, Střešovice is known for its wealth and historic houses from the Functionalist period. Notable sights include Villa Müller and Baba, a fully protected area filled with Functionalist villas built in 1937.

== Ruzyně ==
Famous for Václav Havel Airport Prague, as well as for its prison, which once housed former President Václav Havel and other dissidents during the communist regime.

== Government ==
The Civil Aviation Authority has its headquarters at Václav Havel Airport in Ruzyně.

== Climate ==
Climate data for Ruzyně, Praha 6 (normals 1991-2020, extremes 1961-2020)
Month	Jan	Feb	Mar	Apr	May	Jun	Jul	Aug	Sep	Oct	Nov	Dec	Year
Record high °C (°F)	15.8 (60.4)	19.2 (66.6)	24.1 (75.4)	29.7 (85.5)	33.0 (91.4)	36.7 (98.1)	36.3 (97.3)	37.4 (99.3)	32.8 (91.0)	25.4 (77.7)	19.0 (66.2)	17.8 (64.0)	37.4 (99.3)
Mean daily maximum °C (°F)	1.8 (35.2)	3.7 (38.7)	8.4 (47.1)	14.5 (58.1)	18.9 (66.0)	22.2 (72.0)	24.5 (76.1)	24.4 (75.9)	19.1 (66.4)	12.9 (55.2)	12.9 (55.2)	6.5 (43.7)	14.2 (57.5)
Daily mean °C (°F)	−0.7 (30.7)	0.3 (32.5)	4.0 (39.2)	9.2 (48.6)	13.6 (56.5)	17.0 (62.6)	18.9 (66.0)	18.7 (65.7)	13.9 (57.0)	8.7 (47.7)	3.8 (38.8)	0.4 (32.7)	9.0 (48.2)
Mean daily minimum °C (°F)	−3.5 (25.7)	−3.0 (26.6)	0.0 (32.0)	3.6 (38.5)	7.8 (46.0)	11.3 (52.3)	13.1 (55.6)	12.9 (55.2)	9.1 (48.4)	4.9 (40.8)	1.0 (33.8)	−2.2 (28.0)	4.6 (40.2)
Record low °C (°F)	−25.5 (−13.9)	−22.5 (−8.5)	−19.0 (−2.2)	−7.2 (19.0)	−2.4 (27.7)	−0.6 (30.9)	5.0 (41.0)	3.4 (38.1)	−0.5 (31.1)	−7.4 (18.7)	−13.4 (7.9)	−23.5 (−10.3)	−25.5 (−13.9)
Average precipitation mm (inches)	20.2 (0.80)	18.2 (0.72)	29.2 (1.15)	27.5 (1.08)	60.3 (2.37)	73.1 (2.88)	79.2 (3.12)	67.2 (2.65)	38.5 (1.52)	34.2 (1.35)	28.5 (1.12)	25.9 (1.02)	502 (19.78)
Average snowfall cm (inches)	17.9 (7.0)	15.9 (6.3)	10.3 (4.1)	2.9 (1.1)	0.0 (0.0)	0.0 (0.0)	0.0 (0.0)	0.0 (0.0)	0.0 (0.0)	0.1 (0.0)	8.4 (3.3)	45.9 (18.1)	101.4 (39.9)
Average precipitation days (≥ 1.0 mm)	6	5.6	6.7	6.2	9.2	9.8	9.9	9	7.1	7	6.6	6.2	89.3
Average relative humidity (%)	85	82	76	70	70	71	70	72	77	81	85	85	77
Average dew point °C (°F)	−4.6 (23.7)	−3.5 (25.7)	−1.1 (30.0)	2.0 (35.6)	7.0 (44.6)	10.3 (50.5)	11.6 (52.9)	11.5 (52.7)	9.1 (48.4)	5.1 (41.2)	0.6 (33.1)	−2.8 (27.0)	3.8 (38.8)
Mean monthly sunshine hours	57.3	89.5	132.5	196	230.9	235.8	242.7	231.4	169.5	112.7	57.2	48.1	1,803.6
Source: NCEI(snow, humidity, dew point for 1961-1990)

== Demographics ==
Historical population

Year	Pop.	±%
1869	10,070	—
1880	13,180	+30.9%
1890	17,859	+35.5%
1900	25,673	+43.8%
1910	38,148	+48.6%

Year	Pop.	±%
1921	50,617	+32.7%
1930	94,369	+86.4%
1950	114,886	+21.7%
1961	132,474	+15.3%
1970	139,314	+5.2%

Year	Pop.	±%
1980	122,594	−12.0%
1991	110,243	−10.1%
2001	101,252	−8.2%
2011	104,185	+2.9%
2021	103,254	−0.9%

Source: Censuses

== Economy ==
Czech Airlines has its headquarters on the grounds of Václav Havel Airport in Ruzyně. Travel Service Airlines and its low-cost subsidiary, Smart Wings, also have their headquarters on the airport property.

== Education ==
Universities located in Prague 6:

- Czech Technical University (ČVUT)
- Institute of Chemical Technology (VŠCHT)
- Czech University of Agriculture (ČZU)
- Catholic Theological Faculty (KTF UK) and Faculty of Physical Education and Sport (FTVS UK) of Charles University

International schools:

- Prague British International School Vlastina Campus in Liboc; it formerly belonged to the pre-merger Prague British School.
- International School of Prague
- Japanese School of Prague (Řepy)

== See also ==
- Districts of Prague#Symbols
- Statue of Ivan Konev in Prague
