= Sedlec (Prague) =

- Cadastral Area of Prague
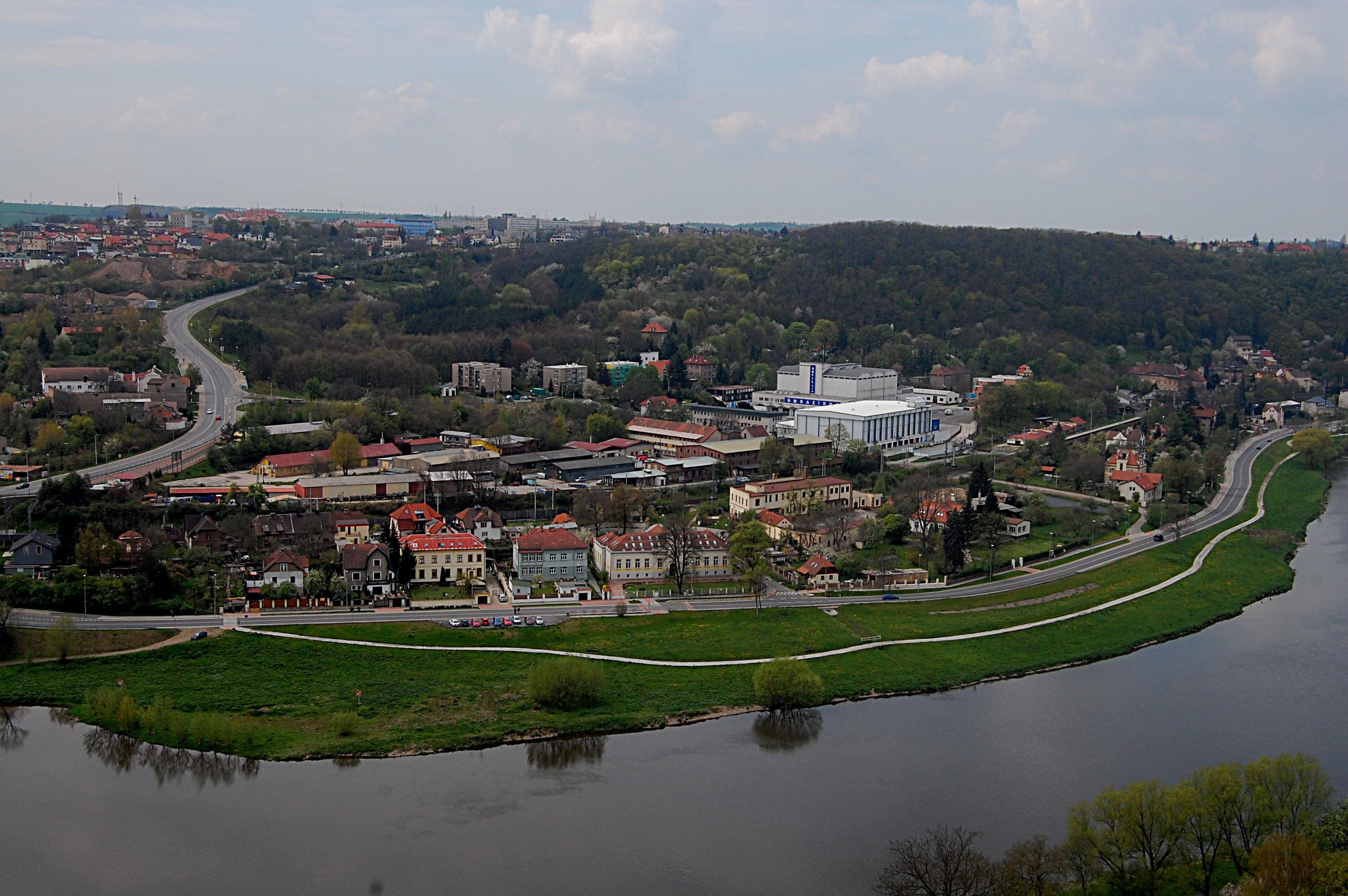
- View of Sedlec from Bohnice

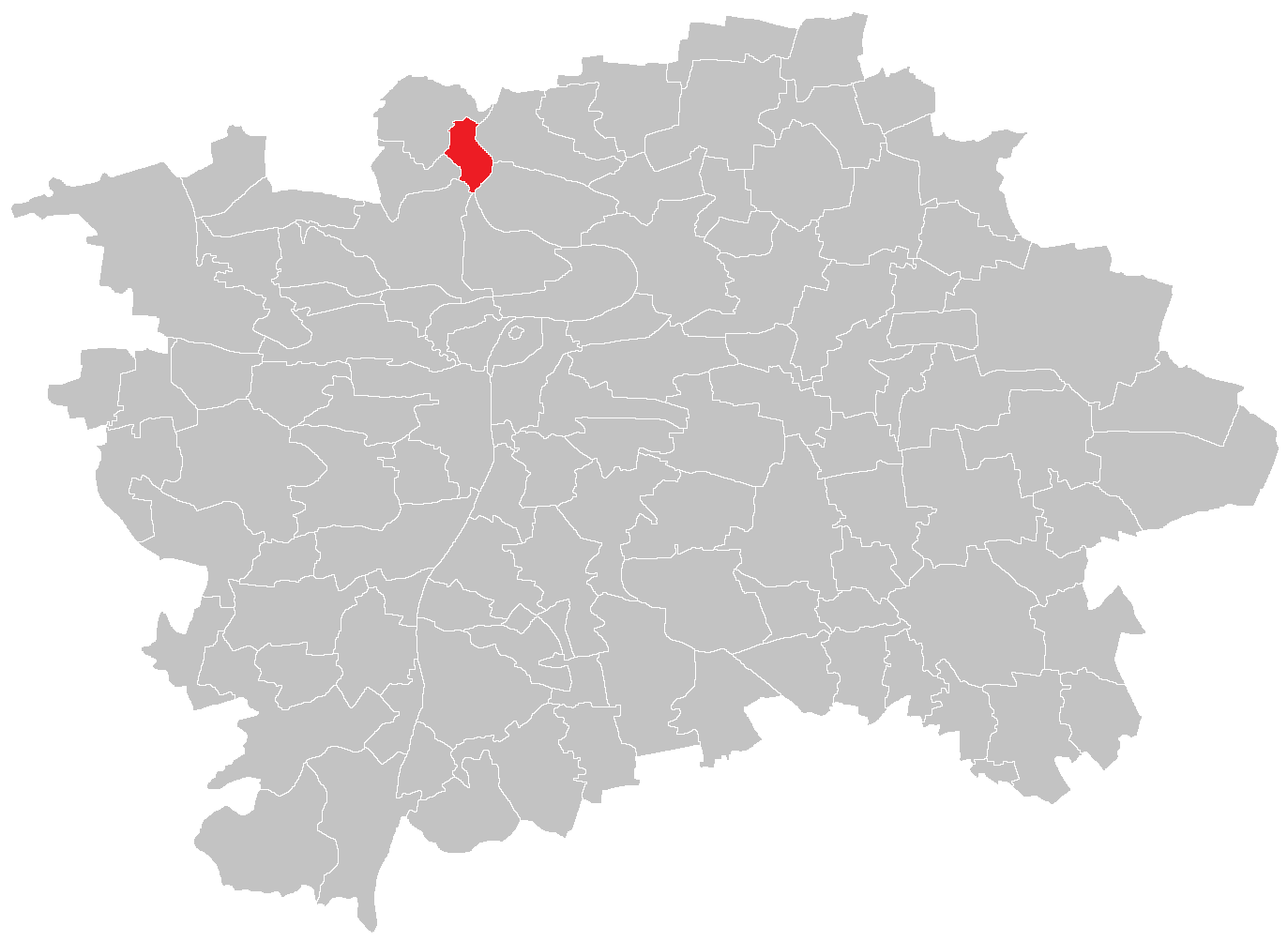
- Location of Sedlec in Prague
- Coordinates: 50°7′58″N 14°23′31″E
- Country: Czech Republic
- Region: Prague
- District: Prague 6, Prague-Suchdol

Area
  - Total: 1.46 km^{2} (0.56 sq mi)

Population (2021)
  - Total: 895
  - Density: 613/km^{2} (1,590/sq mi)
- Time zone: UTC+1 (CET)
  - Summer (DST): UTC+2 (CEST)

Sedlec (German: Selz) is a cadastral district of Prague, Czech Republic. It has about 900 inhabitants.

== Demographics ==
Historical population

Year	Pop.	±%
1869	385	—
1880	510	+32.5%
1890	678	+32.9%
1900	770	+13.6%
1910	1,019	+32.3%
1921	1,229	+20.6%
1930	1,349	+9.8%
1950	1,314	−2.6%

Year	Pop.	±%
1961	1,362	+3.7%
1970	1,264	−7.2%
1980	1,110	−12.2%
1991	779	−29.8%
2001	739	−5.1%
2011	854	+15.6%
2021	895	+4.8%

Source: Censuses
