= Civil Aviation Authority (Czech Republic) =

- Úřad pro civilní letectví

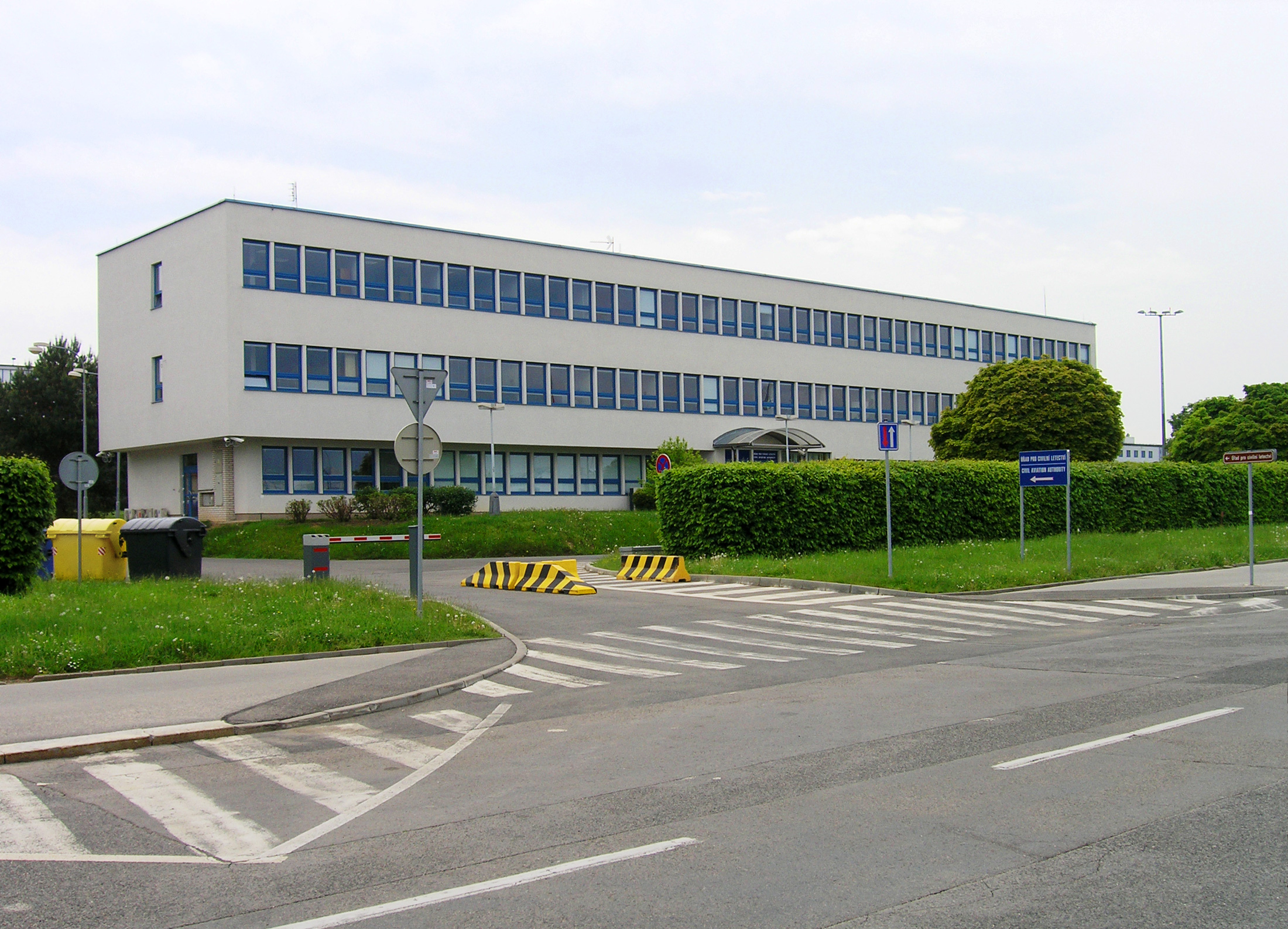
- CAA-CZ head office

Agency overview
- Formed: 18 December 1992
- Headquarters: Prague, Czech Republic
- Agency executive: David Jágr, Director
- Parent agency: Ministry of Transport
- Website: www.caa.gov.cz

The Civil Aviation Authority (CAA-CZ, Czech: Úřad pro civilní letectví) is the civil aviation authority of the Czech Republic. Its head office is on the property of Prague Vaclav Havel Airport in Ruzyně, Prague.
