= Ruzyně =

- Cadastral Area of Prague
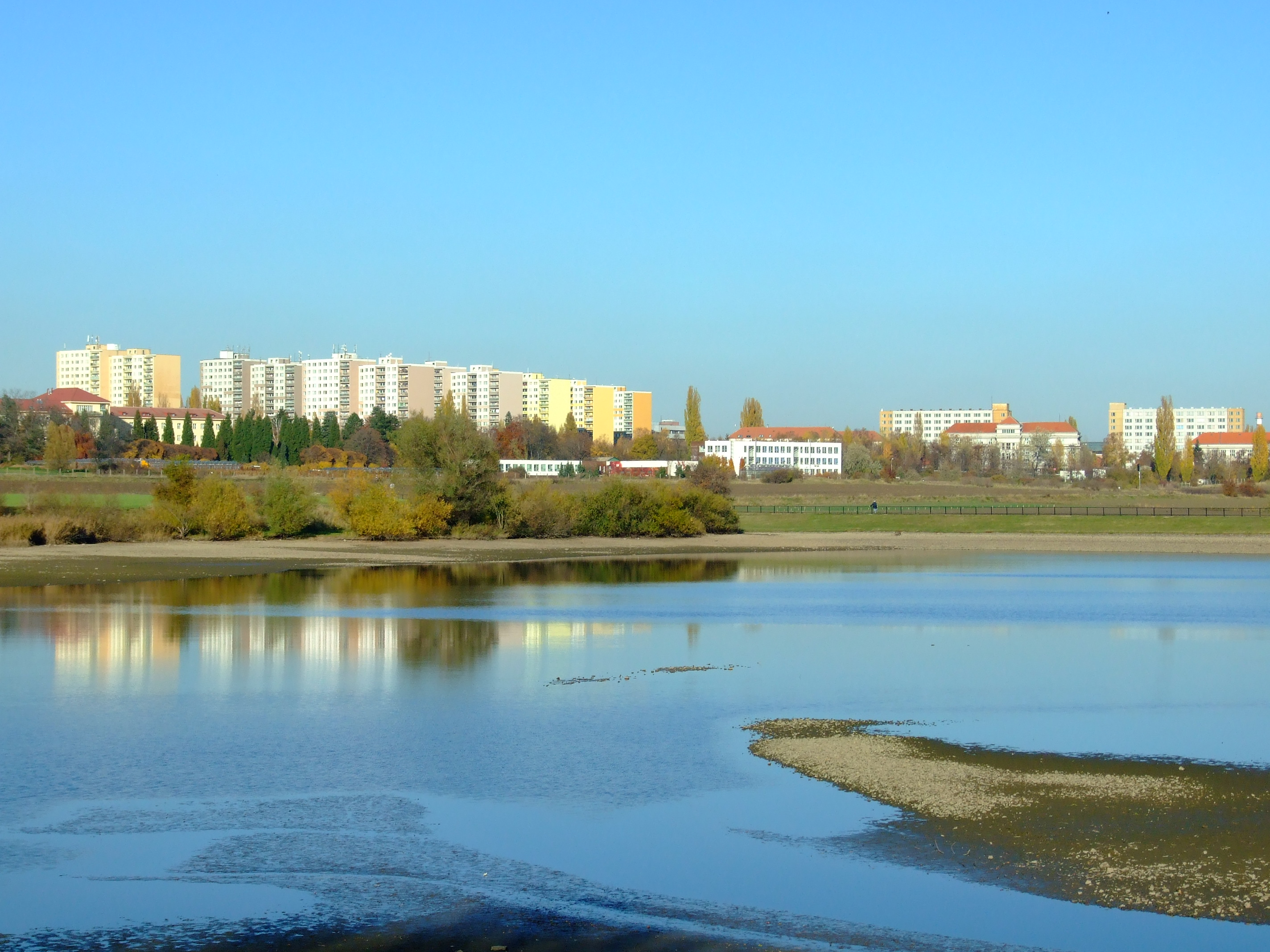
- Na Dědině housing estate

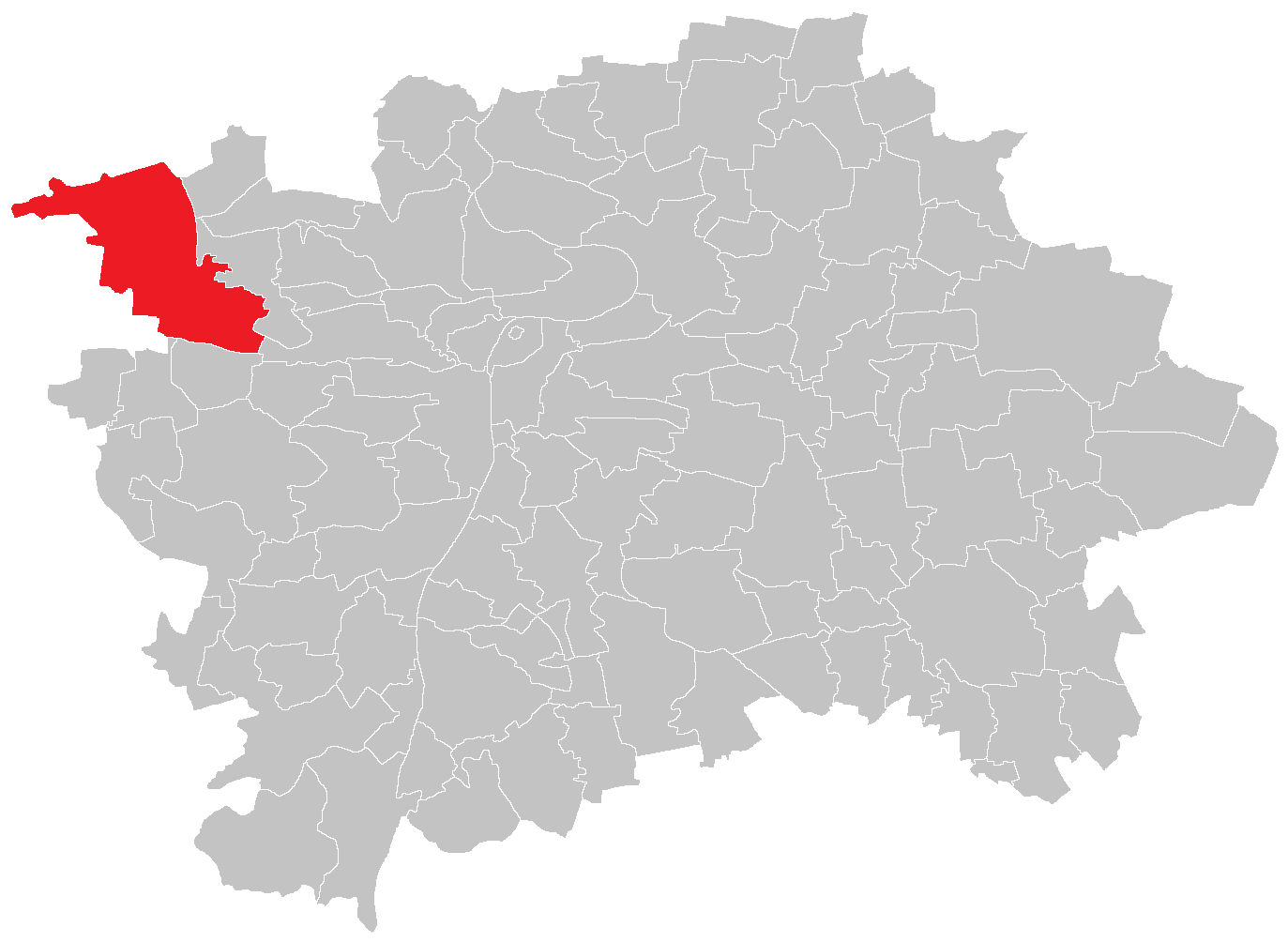
- Location of Ruzyně in Prague
- Coordinates: 50°05′53″N 14°16′10″E
- Country: Czech Republic
- Region: Prague
- District: Prague 6

Area
  - Total: 15.00 km^{2} (5.79 sq mi)

Population (2021)
  - Total: 8,188
  - Density: 545.9/km^{2} (1,414/sq mi)
- Time zone: UTC+1 (CET)
  - Summer (DST): UTC+2 (CEST)
- Postal code: 161 00

Ruzyně is a district of Prague city, part of Prague 6. It has been a part of Prague since 1960.

Václav Havel Airport is located in this district. Czech Airlines has its head office on the grounds of the airport. Travel Service Airlines and its low cost subsidiary Smart Wings have their head office on the airport property. In addition the Civil Aviation Authority also has its head office on the airport property.

Ruzyně Remand Prison is also located within the neighbourhood.

== Demographics ==
Historical population

Year	Pop.	±%
1869	975	—
1880	975	+0.0%
1890	1,093	+12.1%
1900	1,138	+4.1%
1910	1,205	+5.9%
1921	1,117	−7.3%
1930	3,534	+216.4%
1950	5,809	+64.4%

Year	Pop.	±%
1961	5,633	−3.0%
1970	5,538	−1.7%
1980	4,597	−17.0%
1991	8,251	+79.5%
2001	7,902	−4.2%
2011	8,406	+6.4%
2021	8,188	−2.6%

Source: Censuses

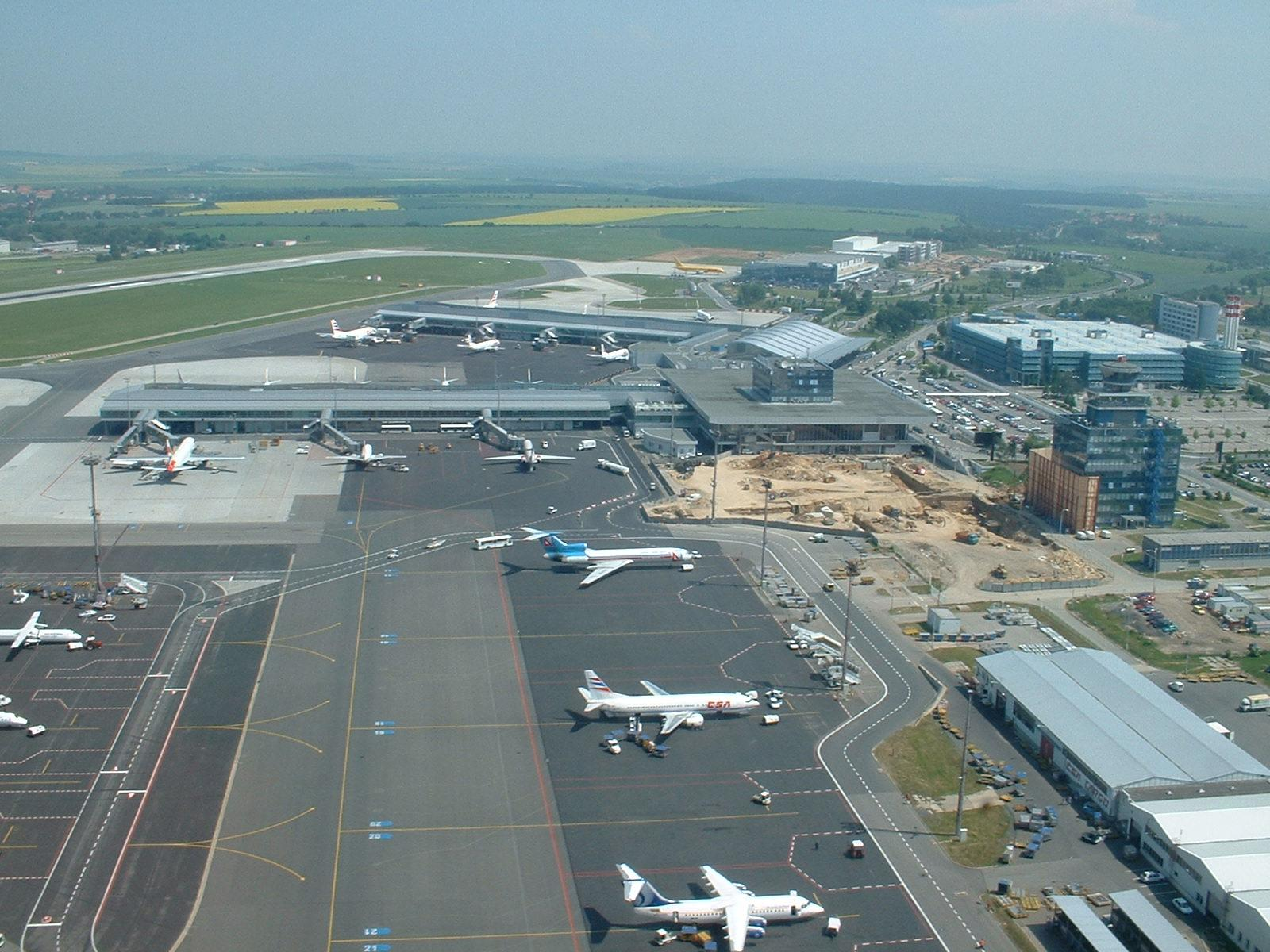
Ruzyně International Airport

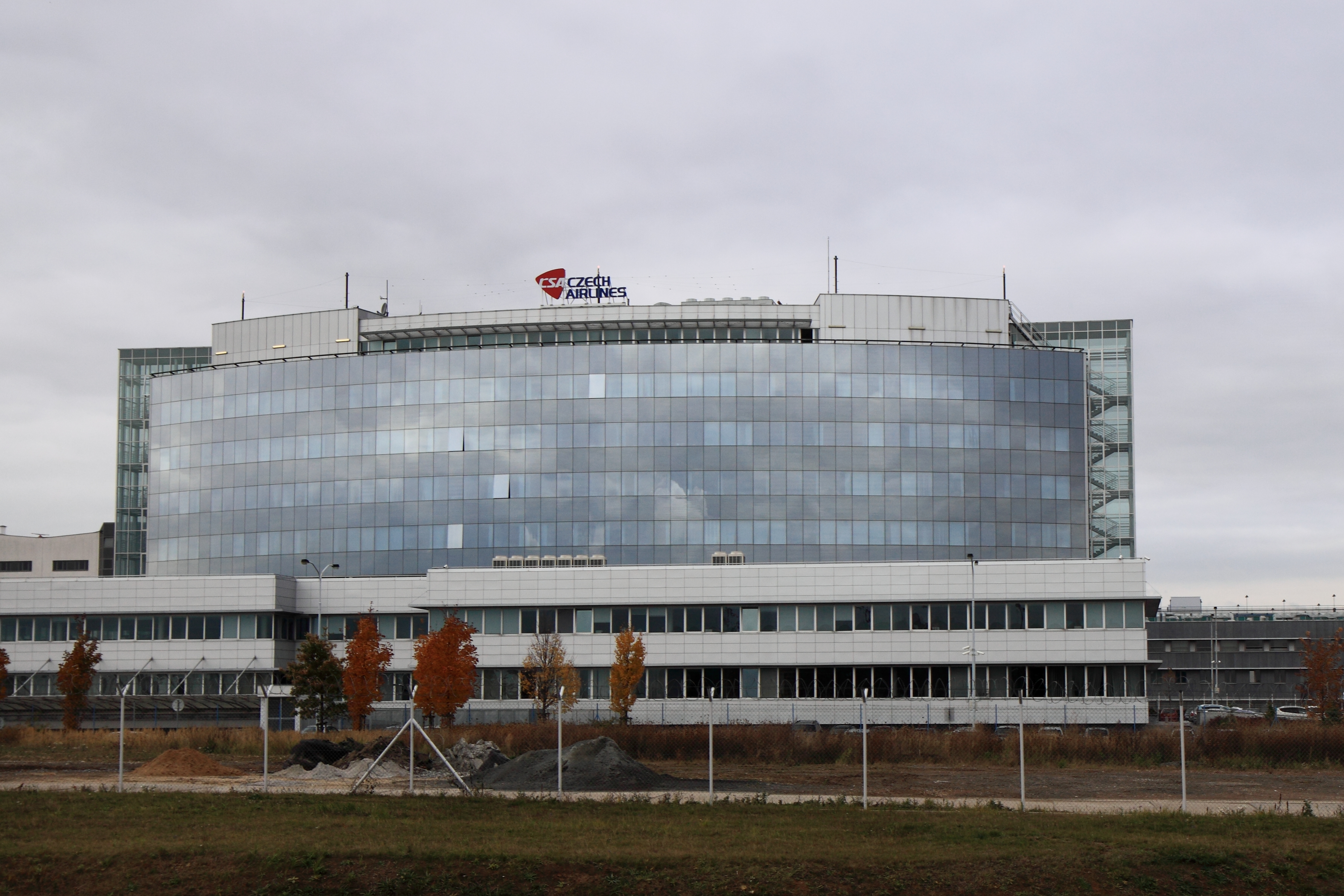
Head office of Czech Airlines

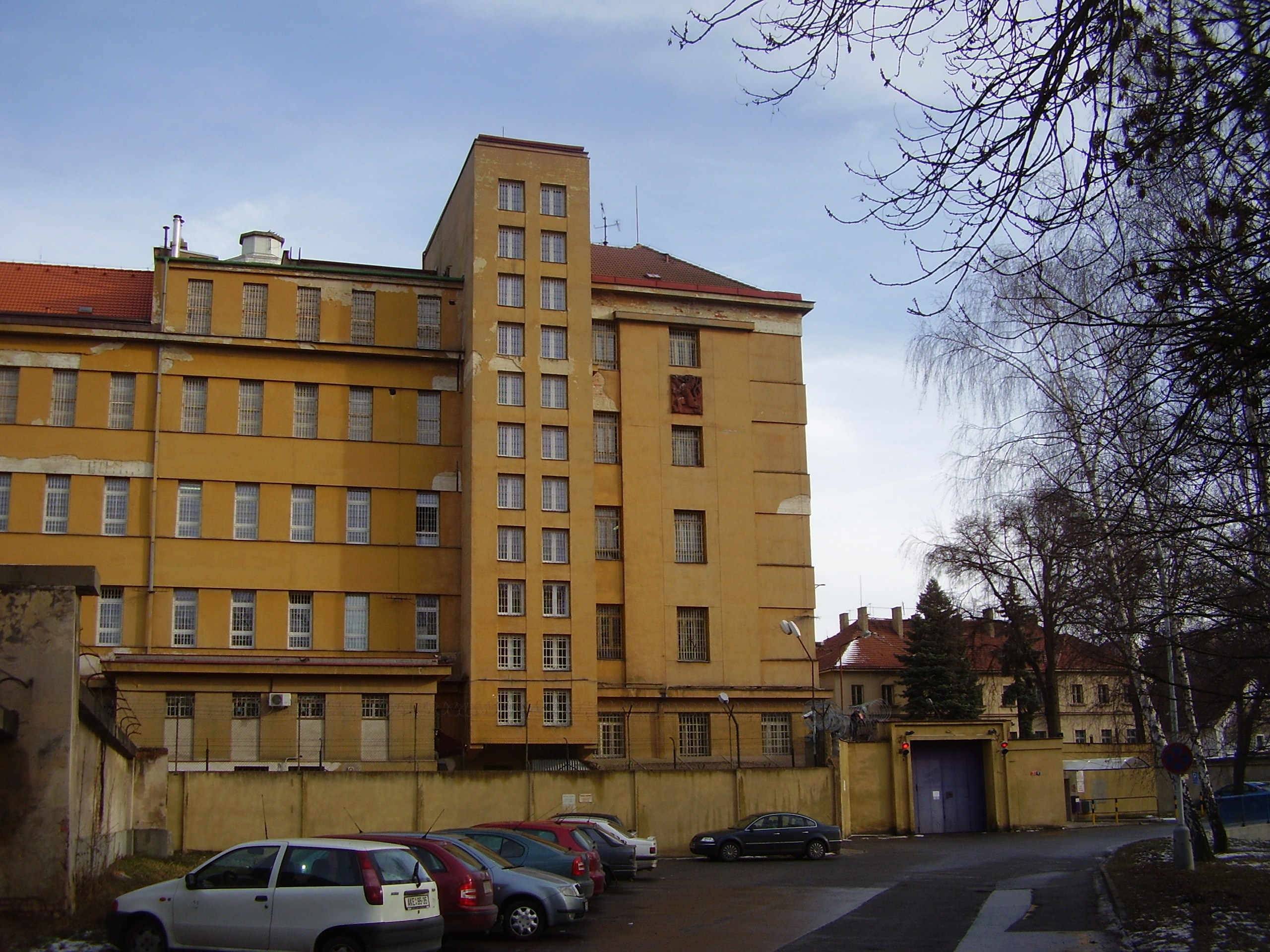
Ruzyně Prison
