= Liboc =

- Cadastral Area of Prague
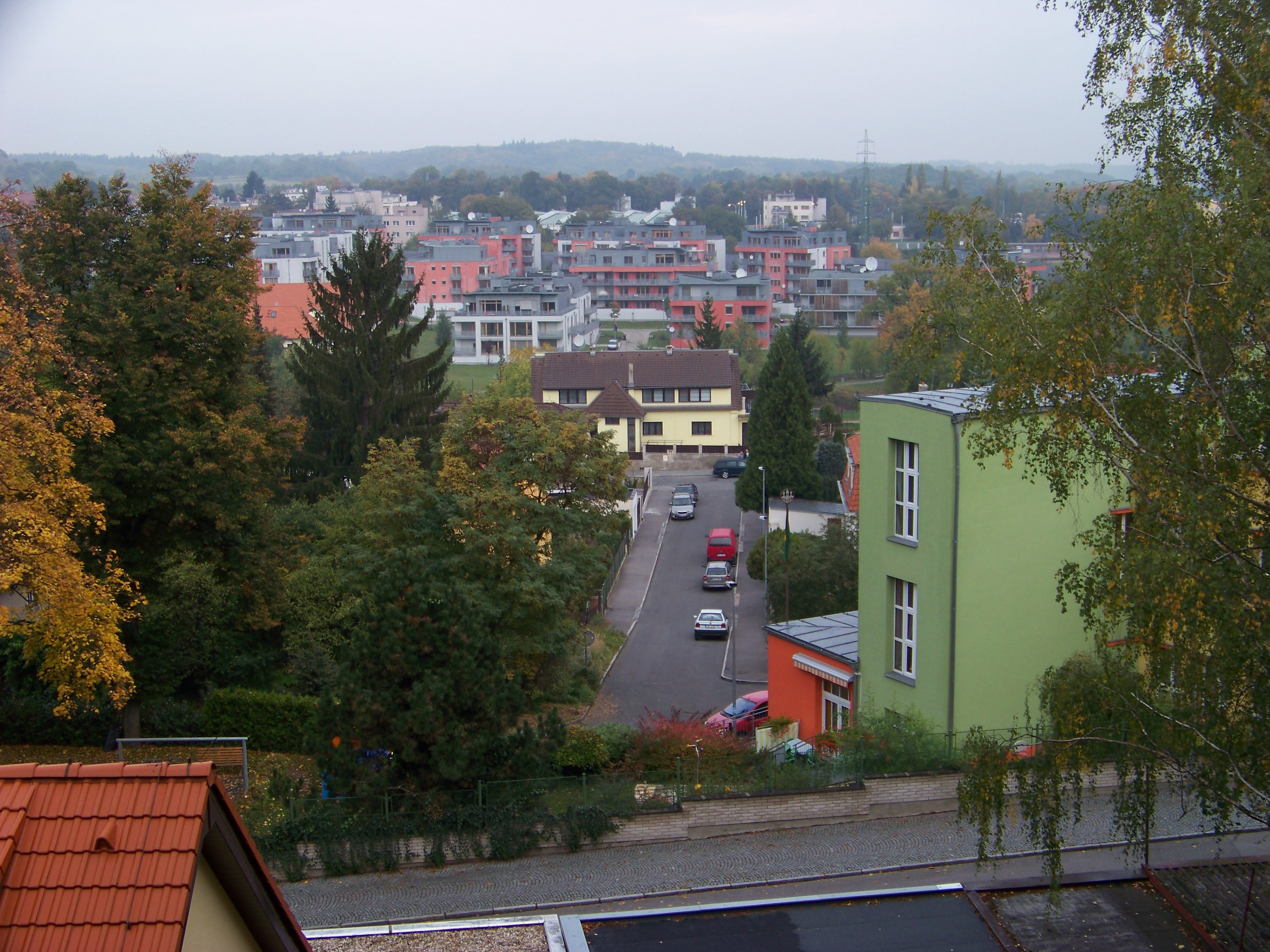
- View of Liboc

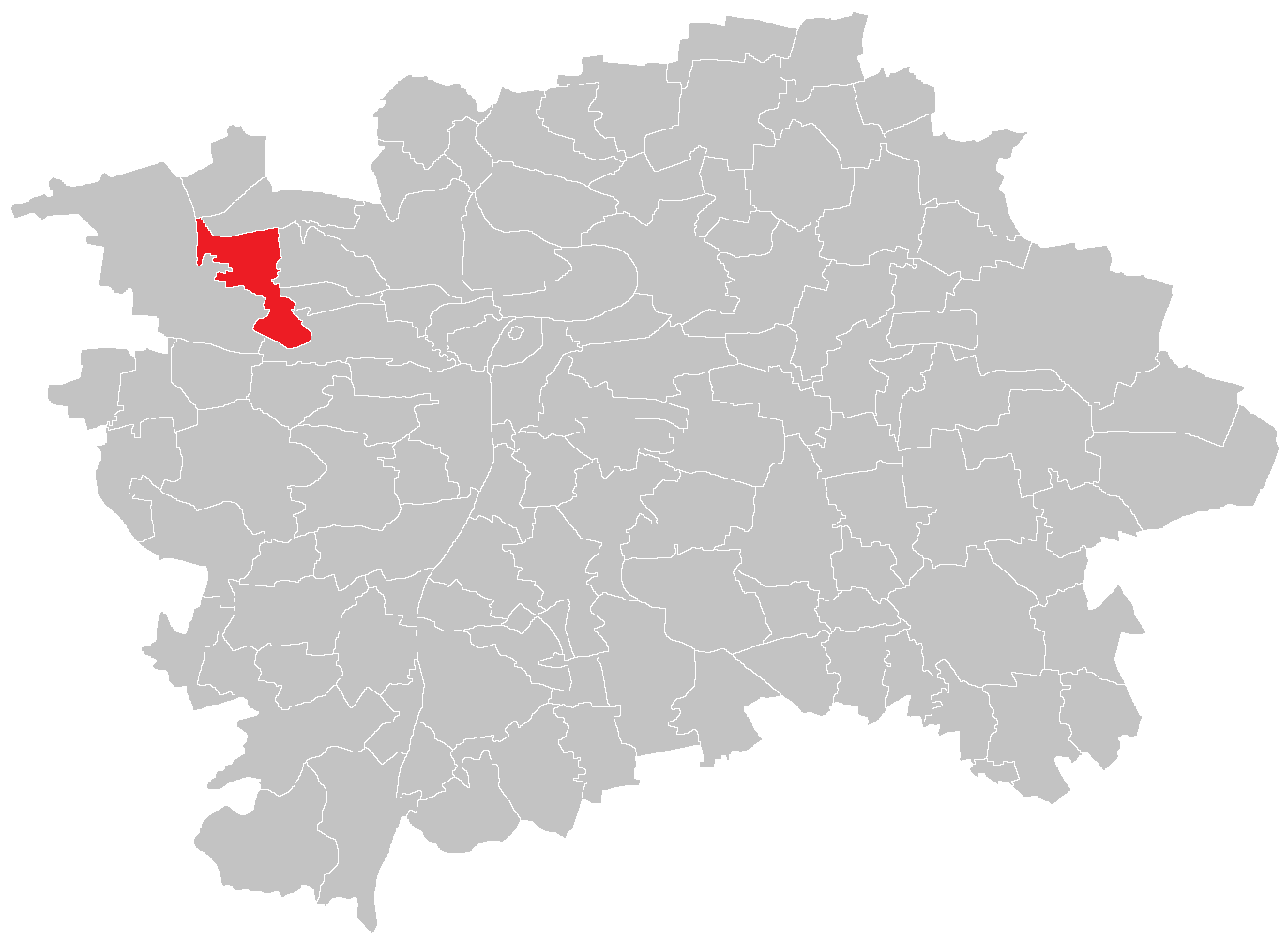
- Location of Liboc in Prague
- Coordinates: 50°05′33″N 14°19′16″E
- Country: Czech Republic
- Region: Prague
- District: Prague 6

Area
  - Total: 4.25 km^{2} (1.64 sq mi)

Population (2021)
  - Total: 4,980
  - Density: 1,170/km^{2} (3,030/sq mi)
- Time zone: UTC+1 (CET)
  - Summer (DST): UTC+2 (CEST)
- Postal code: 161 00, 162 00

Liboc is a district of the city of Prague, the capital of the Czech Republic. It is part of Prague 6, located near Divoká Šárka.

The Prague British International School Vlastina Campus is in Liboc; it formerly belonged to the pre-merger Prague British School.

== Demographics ==
Historical population

Year	Pop.	±%
1869	741	—
1880	880	+18.8%
1890	1,081	+22.8%
1900	1,292	+19.5%
1910	1,587	+22.8%
1921	1,828	+15.2%
1930	2,606	+42.6%
1950	3,796	+45.7%

Year	Pop.	±%
1961	5,107	+34.5%
1970	4,314	−15.5%
1980	3,532	−18.1%
1991	4,649	+31.6%
2001	4,430	−4.7%
2011	5,084	+14.8%
2021	4,980	−2.0%

Source: Censuses

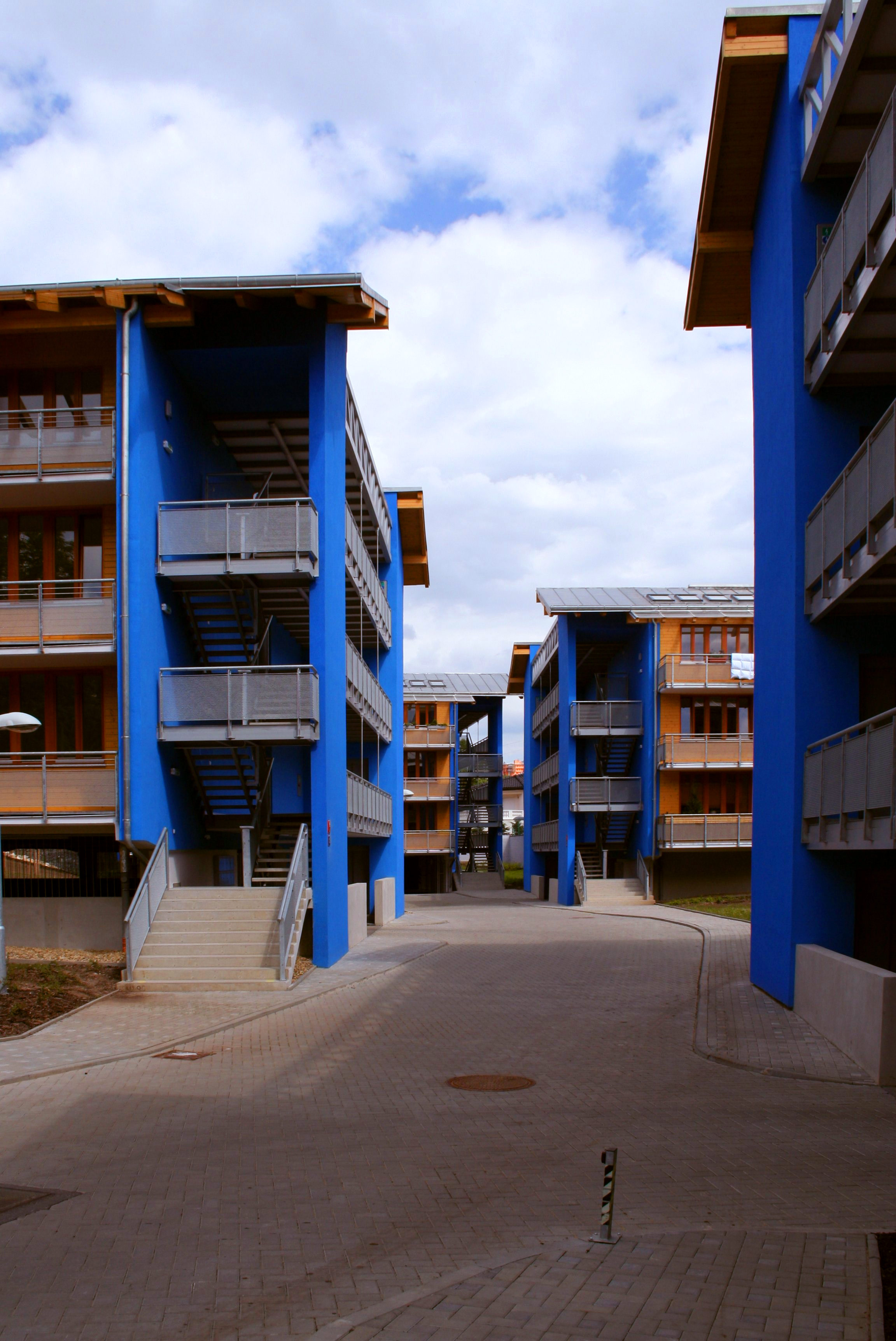
Praha Liboc new housing
