= Břevnov Monastery =

Monastery in Prague, Czech Republic

Coordinates: 50°05′04″N 14°21′25″E

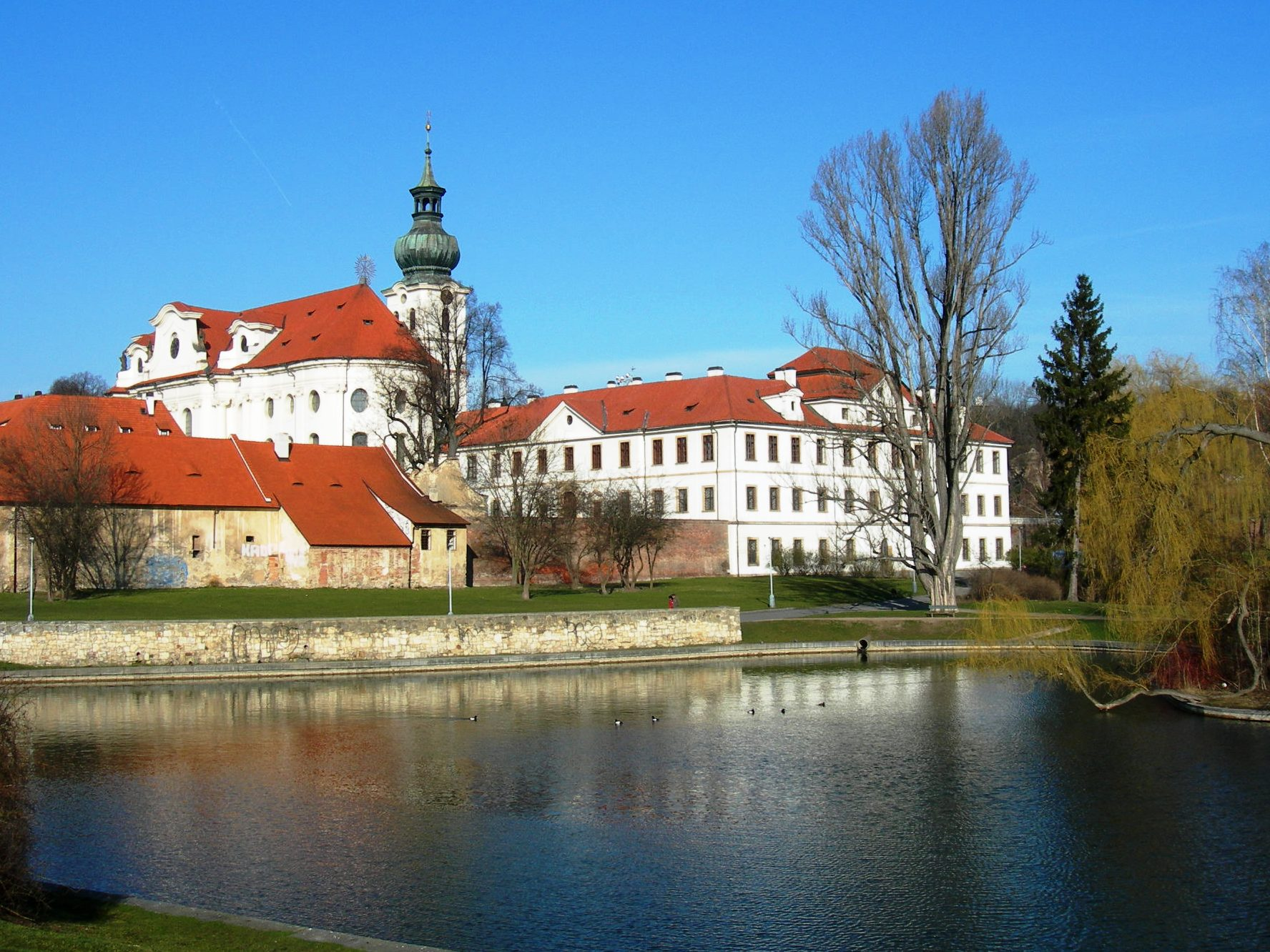
Břevnov Monastery

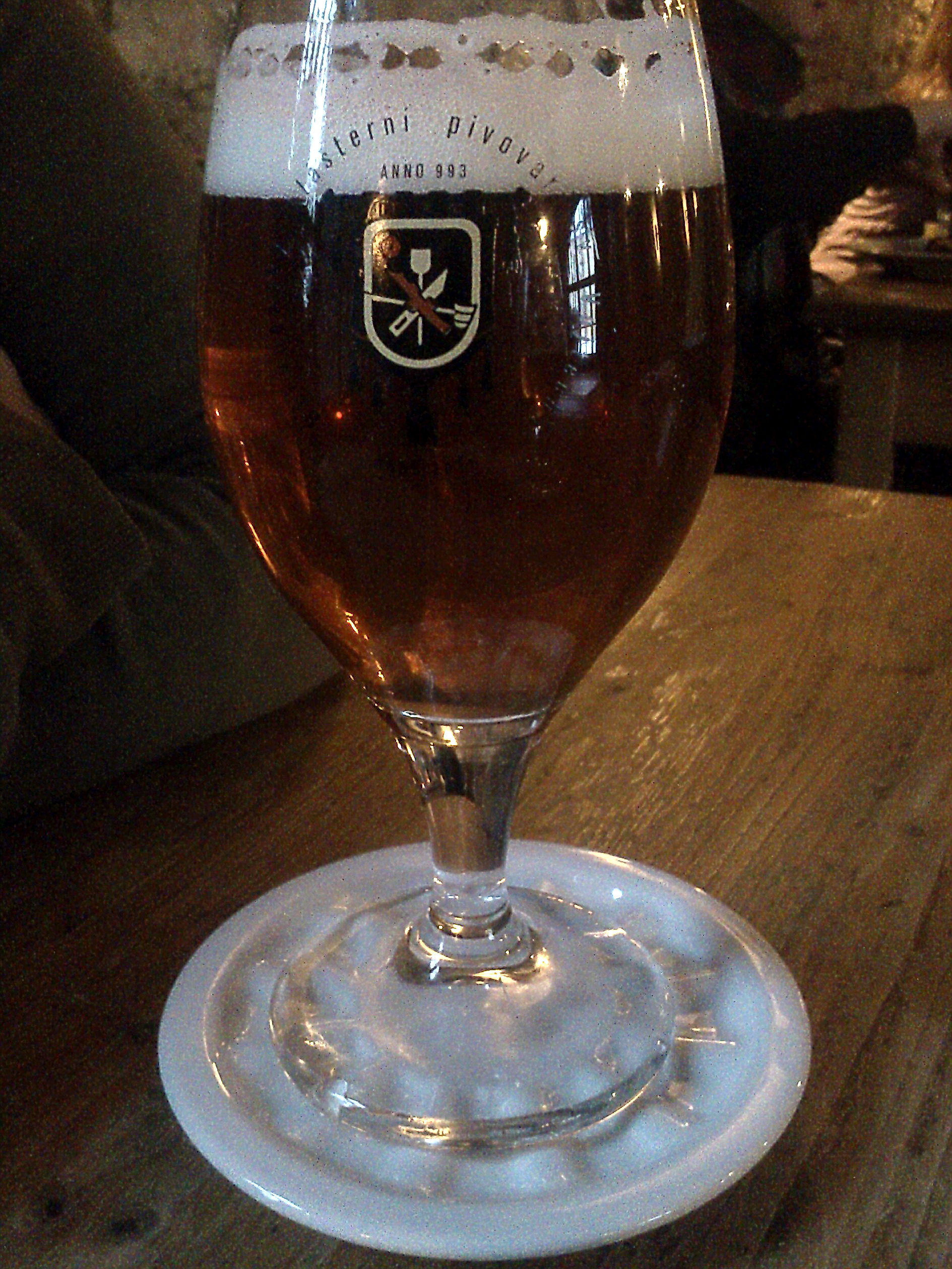
Břevnovský Benedict, Anno 993

Břevnov Monastery (Czech: Břevnovský klášter, German: Stift Breunau) is a Benedictine archabbey in the Břevnov district of Prague, Czech Republic. It was founded by Saint Adalbert, the second Bishop of Prague, in AD 993 with the support of Bohemian Duke Boleslaus II. The first Benedictine male monastery in Bohemia, it also has the oldest tradition of beer brewing in the Czech Republic. Brewing was interrupted several times in the history, but up to today, the Břevnov Monastery Brewery brew its beer here.

== History ==
The monastery was founded in 993 by Adalbert of Prague. Adalbert of Prague left Bohemia in 994 for having disputes with ruler. The new impulse came with the Czech Duke Bretislav I who started construction on stone church and who managed for the monastery remains of Gunther of Bohemia, the monk from Niederaltaich Abbey in Bavaria. Filial monasteries were established at Broumov and Police in northern Bohemia.

During the Hussite Wars in the 1420s, abbot and convent fled to Broumov and the entire monastery including brewery were nearly destroyed. After the Thirty Years' War, the construction of a Baroque monastery complex has been realized under Abbot Othmar Daniel Zinke in 1708–1740 according to plans designed by Christoph Dientzenhofer. The interior of the buildings, including St Margaret's church, the conventual buildings and prelate's house was designed by his son Kilian Ignaz Dientzenhofer, with altarpieces by Petr Brandl, a ceiling fresco by Cosmas Damian Asam and stucco works by his brother Egid Quirin Asam. At the same time the annual production of beer reached up to 5,000 hl. The brewery was closed in 1889 mainly due to the insufficient capacity of the cellar.

After the German occupation of Czechoslovakia in 1938, the monastery was seized by Wehrmacht forces during World War II and finally expropriated by the Communist Czechoslovak government in 1950. Abbot Anastáz Opasek (1913–1999) was condemned for high treason and espionage in a show trial, the monastery was dissolved and the remaining monks were deported, if they had not fled to Bavarian Braunau in Rohr Abbey re-established by their Broumov brothers in 1946.

The complex was used until 1990 by the StB, after the Velvet Revolution, was thoroughly repaired from 1991 until its 1000-years-jubilee in 1993. In 1997 it was visited by Pope John Paul II and was elevated to the rank of an Archabbey.

The monastery served as the basis for the Red Rose Mansion (2005) in Naoki Urasawa's noted anime/manga series Monster. Since 2011, the Břevnov Monastery Brewery (Břevnovský klášterní pivovar) has continued the tradition of beer production, it brews beer under the brand Břevnovský Benedict.
