= Pankrác Prison =

Czech prison opened 1889

Prague Pankrác Remand Prison Vazební věznice Praha Pankrác
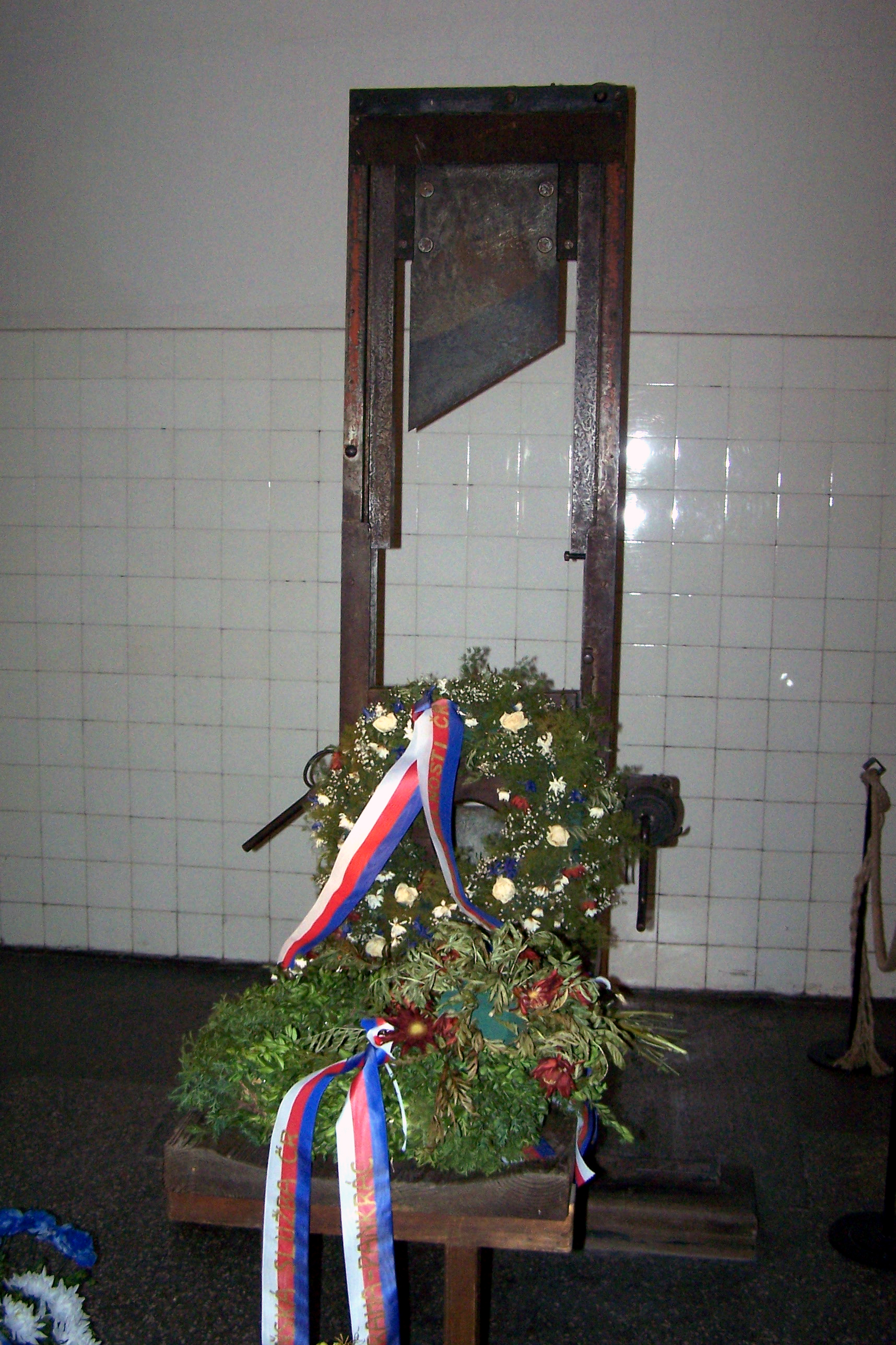
- Guillotine used by the Nazis to behead members of the Czech Resistance. It was recovered from the Vltava River, where it was disposed of by the German Nazis fleeing from the town in May 1945.

- Location in the Czech Republic
- Location: Prague, Czech Republic; 50°03′31″N 14°26′20″E
- Status: Operational
- Capacity: 1075
- Population: 1051 (361 on remand, 690 convicted) (2011)
- Opened: 1889
- Former name: The Emperor's-King's prison for men in Prague; C.k. mužská zemská trestnice v Praze
- Managed by: Prison Service of the Czech Republic
- Director: Col. Marian Prokeš
- Website: www.vscr.cz/veznice-pankrac-26/

Pankrác Prison, officially Prague Pankrác Remand Prison (Czech: Vazební věznice Praha Pankrác), is a prison in Prague, Czech Republic. A part of the Czech Prison Service, it is located southeast of Prague city centre in Pankrác, not far from Pražského povstání metro station on Line C. It is used in part for persons awaiting trial and partly for convicted prisoners. Since 2008, women have also been incarcerated here.

== History ==
=== 1885–1938 ===
The prison was built in 1885–1889 in order to replace the obsolete St Wenceslas Prison (Svatováclavská trestnice), which used to stand between Charles Square and the Vltava River. At the time of its construction, the site for the new prison was out of city limits, amidst fields above Nusle suburb. Nevertheless, the expanding Prague encompassed the prison within several decades. At the time of its opening, the prison was a fairly modern institution with hot air central heating; solitary confinement cells had hot water heating. The prison had gas lighting and its own gasworks. It opened in 1889 under name "The Imperial-Royal prison for men in Prague" (C.k. mužská zemská trestnice v Praze).

The prison included bathrooms, classrooms (prisoners were obliged to become involved in education), a lecture hall, gymnasium, 22 workshop rooms, 6 exercise yards, a Roman Catholic church, an Evangelical chapel, and a Jewish house of prayer. The bedroom section of the prison hospital had 22 rooms for patients from among the prisoners. A large building of Regional court was added to the facility in 1926 and since then it served as the largest of 37 Regional Court prisons for detainees and prisoners serving up to 1-year imprisonment terms. The court and the prison are connected by underground corridor.

In 1926, the prison was approved for conducting capital punishment (by hanging). The first execution was on 6 December 1930, when František Lukšík was hanged for committing a murder and robbery. In total, the prison was the location for 5 executions between 1930 and 1938, when the democratic First Czechoslovak Republic ceased to exist following the Munich Agreement and German, Hungarian and Polish occupation of the country's border areas.

=== German Nazi occupation 1939–1945 ===
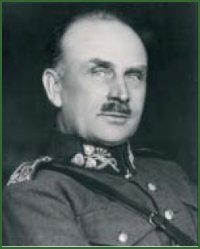
General Josef Bílý, leader of the Czech anti-Nazi resistance group Obrana Národa, imprisoned at Pankrác Prison before being executed by shooting elsewhere

During Nazi German occupation in 1939–1945, the German Gestapo investigation unit and court were established at the prison. The Czech prison guards were replaced by Waffen SS members. Thousands of Czech people, from members of the resistance to alleged black marketeers, were detained here before being sent to execution sites, especially the Kobylisy Shooting Range, to other prisons within Nazi Germany, or to concentration camps. The prison capacity was boosted to 2,200, and it became the largest prison in the occupied country. In spring 1943, the Nazis started carrying out executions directly inside the facility itself, where three cells had been adapted for this purpose.

General Josef Bílý, who at the beginning of the German occupation of Czechoslovakia led the anti-Nazi resistance group Obrana Národa ("National Defense"), was imprisoned at Pankrác Prison before being executed by shooting elsewhere in 1941. Bílý refused a blindfold and his last words to his executioners were "Shoot, you German dogs!"

Between 5 April 1943 and 26 April 1945 a total of 1,079 people (including 175 women) were beheaded by guillotine in Pankrác by Nazi executioners; the number of people hanged in this period is unknown. The chief Nazi executioner was Alois Weiss. The three rooms used for this purpose (colloquially referred to as the sekyrárna, or "axe room" in Czech) have been preserved, and serve as memorial that is occasionally accessible to schools and public.

=== Postwar period ===
After the war, many executions of Nazi officials and collaborators took place in the prison, including the hanging of Karl Hermann Frank, as well as Kurt Daluege, the SS chief responsible for the Lidice and Ležáky massacres. Initially, the executions of Nazis were public, but this practice was soon abandoned.

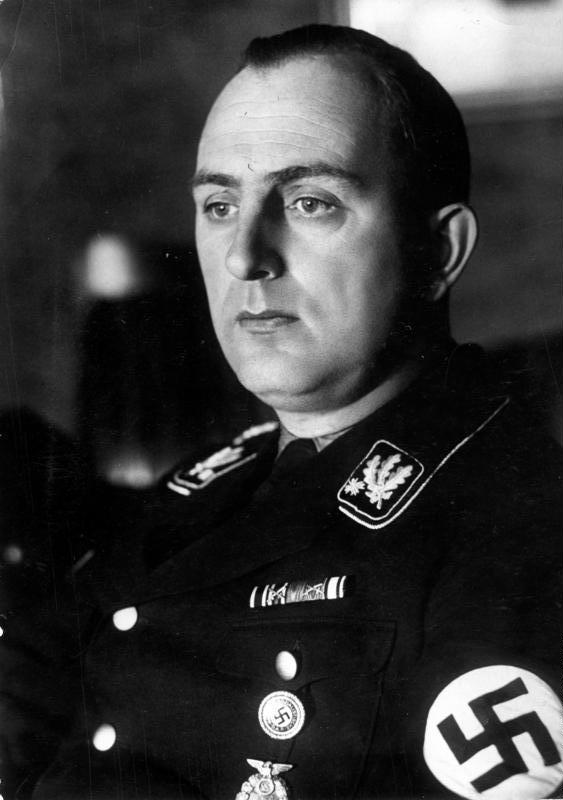
War criminal Kurt Daluege, chief of the German national Order Police, carried out the massacres of Lidice and Ležáky following the assassination of Reinhard Heydrich, the 3rd highest-ranking Nazi. Daluege was hanged at Pankrác prison on October 24, 1946

Following the 1948 communist coup d'état, Pankrác Prison became the place of execution of most of the 234 political prisoners that were executed in Czechoslovakia, including the former Member of Parliament and anti-communist dissident Milada Horáková. Following a power struggle within the party, Rudolf Slánský, former head of the Czechoslovak communist party and one of the creators and organizers of the 1948 coup was killed here as well.

Since 1954, the prison was the only place in the Czech lands where capital punishments were carried out (with few executions taking place between 1968 and 1989 in Bratislava, as regards the Slovak part of the then federation).

In the 1960s, Czechoslovakia became the only country to the East of the Iron Curtain which accepted the United Nations standard minimum rules for prisons. This meant introduction of specialists, e.g. psychologists and pedagogues.

In the last decades before the abolition of capital punishment in Czechoslovakia, the vast majority of hanging were carried out at the prison, the last in 1989. With view to the fact that the number of people executed by hanging by Nazi Germans is unknown, altogether at least 1,580 people were executed in Pankrác Prison between 1930 and 1989.

The Czech dissident Pavel Wonka, who was the last political prisoner to die under the communist regime, was imprisoned at Pankrác, although ultimately he died at a prison in Hradec Králové in 1988.

=== 2011 attempted riot ===
In 2011, prisoners began secret preparations for a riot. After discovering a large stockpile of stabbing and slashing weapons in Pankrác Prison's workshops, the Prison Service and the Czech Police uncovered plans for a coordinated riot in 5 different prisons around the country, effectively preventing it from happening.

== The present ==
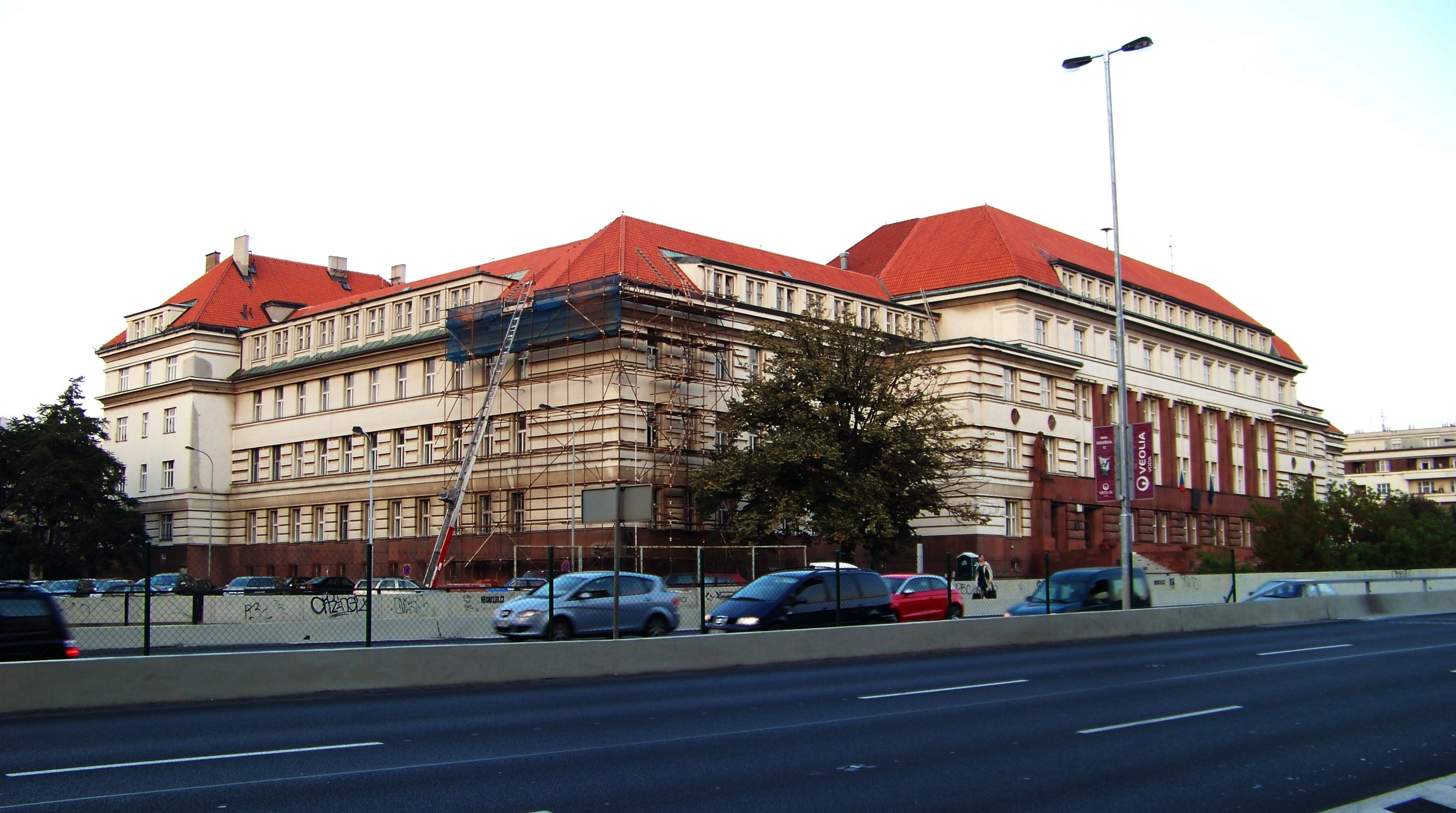
View of the High Court in Prague building in front of the Pankrác Prison, to which it is connected by underground corridor.

The Pankrác Prison serves as a house of detention for charged persons, and partly as a prison for sentenced persons. While the official capacity in 2006 was 858 inmates (with 586 staff), it was 1,075 persons by year 2012 (incl. 111 capacity of the prison hospital). Since 2008, also women are incarcerated here. According to an official report of the Czech Prison Service, the prison held on average 361 people on remand (incl. 27 women) and 690 convicts (incl. 26 women) in 2011; most convicts were held under B and C security level, with only 53 under A (lightest) and 20 under D (maximum security).

During the week, convicted prisoners are involved in 40 to 50 activities whose purpose is to reduce tension and uncertainties which accumulate due to being imprisoned. Working opportunities are only available to a small part of detainees. The convicts work in the framework of internal workplaces, e.g., such as KOVO, Printing office, Laundry, Maintenance, Automobile repair shops. The total of 25 workplaces have been established for the convicts in the prison where working activities take place. Also, some convicts work at workplaces out of the prison.

In the prison, 9 educational, 22 special-interest (club-or hobby-oriented), and 14 special formative activities are organized for convicted inmates (not to those held on remand, though). Based on the result of diagnostic examination, a treatment program is designed for each convict. The goal of such program is the development of personality, enhancement of creativeness in purposeful uses of free time, and improvement in the involvement in civilian life of the convicts. Sporting activities are also available to the convicts during outings or in the form of exercises and games in the prison’s gymnasium.

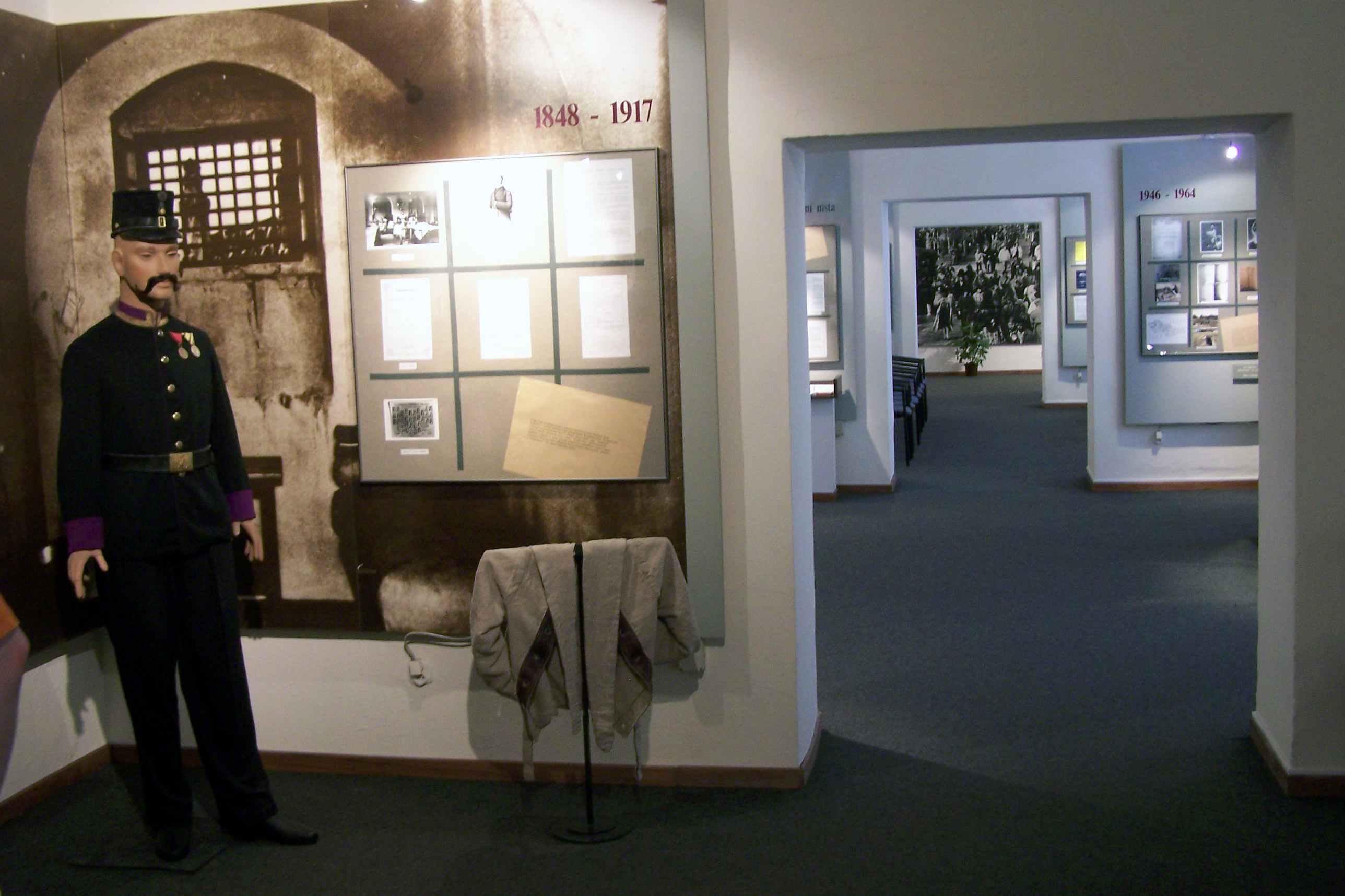
The historical exhibition at the prison, which is not open to the general public.

The premises contain also has the Pankrác Memorial, containing an exhibition on the Prison Service.

=== Criticism ===
While the Czech prison system is facing much general criticism mainly due to overcrowding and under-financing, its shortcomings are even more felt in the remand prisons, including the Pankrác Prison. Although the principle of "not guilty until proven otherwise" applies, in reality the inmates held on remand face worse regime than those convicted, as they cannot take part in educational, sport or working activities, mostly because they are expected to be held only for a limited time (the average is approximately 100 days) before being either released or moved after the verdict.

The prisoners held on remand spend up to 23 hours a day locked in their prison cells, where there is no access to warm water and often also not to electricity (apart from lights switched on and off by the guards from outside). In 2012, the inmates were allowed to take warm water shower only twice a week, with each shower being limited to five minutes.

Phone calls are allowed only once every two weeks. According to Mindii Kašibadze, who spent two years in Pankrác on remand before the Czech courts eventually dismissed his Georgian international arrest warrant, the prison is infested with rats and has only "five cells of European standard which are a show case for outside visitors".

=== Tunnel ===
The tunnel between the Pankrác Prison and the High Court in Prague allows safe passage of detainees from the prison to the courthouse. Therefore, some high security risk cases, such as the 2010 Russian mafia bosses' trial, take place at the High Court's building. In such cases, the responsible judges from other districts come to conduct trial in the High Court's building, rather than detainees being transported to their courthouses.

== Some people imprisoned or executed in Pankrác ==
Anti-Nazi Resistance:

- Josef Bílý
- Alois Eliáš
- Julius Fučík
- Rudolf Karel
- František R. Kraus
- Kamil Krofta
- two out of the Three Kings
- Anna Letenská
- Radovan Richta
- Vladislav Vančura

Other political victims of German Nazi persecutions:

- Josef Beran
- Norbert Čapek
- Petr Zenkl

Perpetrators of war crimes and Nazi collaborators:

- Karel Čurda
- Kurt Daluege
- Karl Hermann Frank - hanged in the courtyard of the Pankrác Prison
- Emil Hácha
- Rudolf Jung
- Hans Krebs (SS general)
- Josef Pfitzner - executed outside the Pankrác Prison in the last public execution in Czechoslovakia
- Augustin Přeučil
- Jan Rys-Rozsévač

Victims of Communism:

- Vladimír Clementis
- Rudolf Antonín Dvorský
- Václav Havel
- Milada Horáková
- Záviš Kalandra
- Rudolf Margolius
- Bohumil Modrý
- Bedřich Reicin
- Zdenka Cecília Schelingová
- Rudolf Slánský
- Otto Šling
- Štěpán Trochta
- Václav Vaško

Notorious criminals:

- Princ Dobroshi - Kosovar drug lord (held under international arrest warrant)
- Dominik Feri - rapist, first black Member of the Czech Parliament (held in the prison hospital in November 2024)
- Marie Fikáčková - serial killer of newborns
- Olga Hepnarová - mass murderer
- Václav Mrázek - serial killer
- Roman Týc - artist (served one month for failing to pay fine for illegally modifying traffic lights)

Other:

- Randy Blythe - vocalist of American heavy metal band Lamb of God (held on remand under manslaughter charges)
- Chris Denning – British DJ and sex offender
- Ivan Olbracht - writer
- Muhammad Salih - Uzbek poet and opposition leader (held under international arrest warrant for alleged terrorist activities)
- Géza von Cziffra - Hungarian film director

== See also ==
- Ruzyně Prison
- List of prisons in the Czech Republic
