= Ztohoven =

Czech guerrilla artist collective

Ztohoven is a Czech guerrilla artist collective known for their artistically motivated pranks. The group consists of a core of around 20 regularly active artists, rising to around 100 when additional participants are called upon for a particular task.

Ztohoven aims for a limited number of high quality works, as opposed to concentrating on a high volume of minor works. Thus, the group tends to disappear from public notice for long periods only to resurface, sometimes years later. The group aims to use familiar tools and methods to challenge public perceptions of society.

Members of the group are anonymous, and use pseudonyms when appearing or commenting in public. Many of the names used by the group's members are puns, some of which (e.g. Roman Tyc, Dan Gerous or Ana Ward) are chosen to work in English as well as Czech.

Among the most active members are Roman Týc and Tomáš Jasný (alias Philip Dvorský). The Ztohoven name is itself a Czech-language pun, and can be read either as Z toho ven ("The way out"), or Sto Hoven ("One hundred shits"). The group translates the name into English as "Out of shit".

== Projects ==
=== The question mark above the Prague Castle ===
First event of Ztohoven at all was when they covered the left half of a 20-meter-tall (66 ft) pink neon heart by Czech artist Jiří David and installed on Václav Havel's demand on the rooftop of the Prague Castle, the seat of the President. Under the heart Ztohoven installed a red light with a diameter of one meter. From a distance, a big question mark was seen instead of a heart.

The heart was a part of a famous sign of Václav Havel, who was ending his presidency at that time. The Czech nation was absorbed by a large doubt: Who will be the next and who could replace Havel?

=== Subconscious raped ===
In 2003, Ztohoven replaced all 750 posters in the backlighted advertisement display cases ("Citylights") in Prague's subway system by white posters with a big black question mark and a web address of their web site. This overnight action hit all the people on their way to the work during the morning. Ztohoven's web page showed nothing but a few words that at 2pm there would be more information displayed. At 2pm the webpage turned into an invitation to an opening of an instant exhibition in the vestibule of the Dejvická subway station, where each of Ztohoven members, plus invited artists, turned existing citylights into original art pieces using all the advantages of this media – backlight, electricity, sound and space. Everything was cleaned up by subway workers during the next 24 hours, but in the meantime, hundreds of people came to see and witness this event which had no precedent in Czech art history. In connection to the choice of typically advertising media and because of parody of promoting themselves in order to promote the principles of art, the group named this act "Subconscious raped" (Znásilněný Podvědomí). It was their first action that led to prosecution of a group.

=== The Media Reality ===
Atomic explosion - mushroom cloud in a public TV broadcast On 17 June 2007, Ztohoven disconnected one of the cameras used for automatic live forecast broadcast from Krkonoše mountains and connected their own pre-recorded video source. On the live morning ČT2 TV show "Panorama", the pre-recorded video was broadcast; it depicted a fictitious atomic explosion with mushroom cloud over the mountains. This led to the January 2008 announcement that six Ztohoven members would be prosecuted for scaremongering and spreading false information; they faced prison sentences of up to three years. On 25 March 2008 a Czech judge dismissed the scaremongering charges against the artists, citing public amusement rather than public unrest, but the prosecutor said the state would consider an appeal.

In December 2007, the Czech National Gallery awarded Ztohoven the NG 333 prize for works unrelated to the "Media Reality" incident; this included CZK 333 000.

=== Citizen K. ===
This name of this 4th Ztohoven event is also a pun. In Czech Občan K. means 'Citizen K.' while the word Občanka is the colloquial expression for Občanský průkaz, the Czech national identity card.

With the same haircut, twelve members of Ztohoven took photo portraits. Using morphing software they merged two faces into one in which it would be possible to recognize the significant facial features of both. They applied for new IDs, but each of them used the name of his colleague. Through twelve months they lived under that fictitious identity, participated in elections, traveled abroad, applied for and received a gun license, or even married. After this period, on an exposition launched 18 June 2010 they revealed their secret identities including documentation of entire process. Their IDs were confiscated and Roman Týc was arrested.

=== Non multi sed multa ===
In July 2011 Ztohoven added one cross to the remaining 27 crosses lying on Staroměstské náměstí (Old Town Square in Prague) in order to express a tribute to unjustly neglected Martin Fruwein from Podolí - one of the 28 Czech Lords claimed responsible, and so to be executed for the revolt for Czech ideals - who had apparently committed suicide in the meantime, so on the day of the execution (21 June 1621) only his dead body was decapitated. According to Maria Klodinska, a historian of Academy of Sciences of Czech Republic, placing the 28th cross is historically justified, because those 27 Czech Lords were in fact 28. The 28th cross remained laying unnoticed for three days.

=== The Moral Reform ===
Moral reform of political scene, initiated by Czech controversial art group Ztohoven, caused confusion at the 40th meeting of the Chamber of Deputies of the Czech Republic Parliament from its very beginning. In a sophisticated way Ztohoven managed to send 585 SMS messages directly to cell phones of deputies, government members, selected members of the President of Czech Republic office including the president himself and selected journalists. Ztohoven found a way of sending the messages on behalf of deputies themselves (spoofing) which caused surprise and confusion. This caused the message to appear on the cellphone display under the name of the sender. During the first minutes people were watching a live broadcast from Congress on Czech TV - targeted deputies staring at their mobiles, twisting heads, searching for the authors of messages in order to confirm the sender. In the end, selected journalists were targeted asked to reserve their time for a government declaration of The Moral Reform. This time, Ztohoven delayed their signing up. The magazine Týden was the first who informed that it may be the Ztohoven who are behind this on 6 June in the morning. Later that day, on their webpage Ztohoven confirmed their authorship and posted The Manifest of The Moral Reform as well as an interactive web application of The Moral Reform on Ztohoven.com where everyone can go through from who, to who and what was the messages including the content of all of the 585 sent messages. The text messages called for a moral reform in Czech politics across political parties, forget personal differences and work towards better future.

In November 2012 the group published cell phone numbers of Czech deputies and President as a part of the exhibition Morální reforma (The Moral Reform) in the modern art center DOX, Prague - Holešovice.

=== The red boxer shorts over Prague Castle ===
On Saturday 19 September 2015, members of Ztohoven stole the presidential flag flying over Prague Castle and replaced it with a flag-sized mock up of a pair of red boxer shorts. The incident was confirmed by Castle spokesman Jiří Ovčáček. On his Twitter account, Ovčácek referred to the fascisization of "Pražská kavárna" (literally "Prague cafe", presumably meaning Prague cafe society, a term used by Miloš Zeman to describe his opponents) and said that they no longer recoil from desecrating a state symbol. A confusingly backdated blog post on the group website linked to a video of the prank and stated that finally, here was flying the standard of a man who is ashamed of nothing. Alongside this was a poem of three stanzas. In the first stanza, the giant boxer shorts are described as being as red as the Chinese flag, embarrassment and rage. In the second, they are said to be fluttering, not missing the buttocks which are evermore disfiguring the country. In the third ironic stanza, the garment is said to be waving as the standard of a lord who is the arbiter of elegance and wisdom. News reports on Sunday had it that the Czech political class was unconcerned by events. Czech Premier, Bohuslav Sobotka, took the prank as "a coarse practical joke" and dismissed any suggestion that it might be related to fascism. "The country that gave the world Jára Cimrman will undoubtedly be able to cope with a giant pair of boxer shorts flapping over the castle," he said. "Own up, who's missing a pair of red boxers?" asked chairman of KDU-ČSL and minister of Agriculture, Marian Jurečka on his Twitter account. The chairman of ODS, Petr Fiala, took a different stance, describing the stunt as "in bad taste". "The flag is a state symbol and does not belong to Miloš Zeman", he said, "and we ought to honour it irrespective of what we think of the individual holding office." The minister of Defence, Martin Stropnický of ANO, considered that the action was a form of democracy and said he was not greatly concerned by it. The previous week, he added, while in conversation with television political correspondent Václav Moravec, the security arrangements at the Castle had been discussed without regard to the issue of giant red boxer shorts, and had been found wanting. The latest Ztohoven stunt would do nothing to change their need for improvement.

The boxer shorts were publicly burnt by firemen in the presence of Zeman at an impromptu press conference three years later, on 15 June 2018. Czech media said the president had purchased the same boxer shorts from the state property office for the price of one Czech crown.

== See also ==
- Broadcast signal intrusion
- Activism
- Privacy
- Hacking
