= Přeučil =

Přeučil (feminine: Přeučilová) is a Czech surname, meaning '[he] retrained'. Notable people with the surname include:

- Augustin Přeučil (1914–1947), Czech military pilot
- Vojtěch Přeučil (born 1990), Czech footballer
- William Preucil (born 1958), American violinist
