= František Patočka =

František Patočka (22 October 1904 – 14 March 1985) was a Czech microbiologist and serologist. He established the study of virology in Czechoslovakia. His brother Jan Patočka was a philosopher.

== Life ==
Patočka was born on 22 October 1904 in Turnov in Bohemia, Austria-Hungary. He graduated from Charles University in 1928, studying medicine and specialising in microbiology. In 1936, he became head of the Czech Bacteriological Institute after Ivan Honl. At the end of World War II, together with epidemiologist Karel Raška, Patočka was personally leading measures to stop the spread of epidemic typhus in the Theresienstadt Ghetto. Together, they wrote a report describing the appalling conditions and mistreatment of German civilians incarcerated in the Small Fortress after the war ended. In the 1960s, he worked as an expert for the WHO in India and Zaire.

Patočka died on 14 March 1985 Prague, aged 80.
