= Rudolf Karel =

Czech conductor and composer

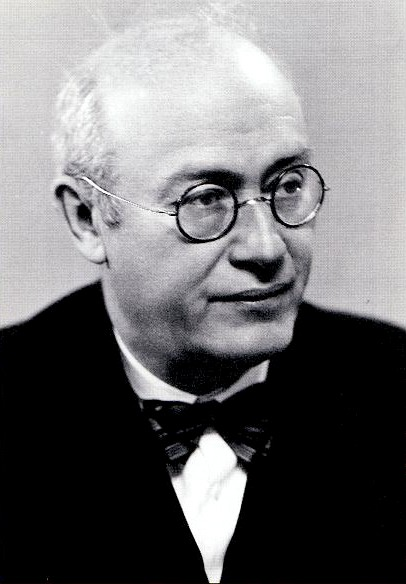

Rudolf Karel (9 November 1880 – 6 March 1945) was a distinguished Czech composer.

== Biography ==
Rudolf Karel was a son of a railway employee. He studied law at Charles University and then composition from 1899 to 1904 with Antonín Dvořák and organ with Josef Klička. When WWI started he was visiting Russia. He was arrested, but managed to escape. He joined Czechoslovak Legions and served as a conductor of their orchestra. In 1923 he became a professor at Prague Conservatory. During WWII he took part in the resistance and in March 1943 was arrested. After being interned and tortured at Pankrác prison for two years (1943–1945) Karel was sent to Theresienstadt prison. The conditions in the prison were dire and he became ill with dysentery and pneumonia. SS-Oberscharführer Stefan Rojko sent all ill prisoners outside in freezing cold to disinfect the cell. As a result Karel and 8 other prisoners died on 6 March 1945.

Ih Pankrác and Theresienstadt he continued working. He composed five-act fairy-tale opera Three Hairs of the Wise Old Man, writing on toilet paper using pencil or medicinal charcoal. The 240 sheets containing a detailed sketch of the opera was secretly passed to a friendly warden. The orchestrations were completed after his death and from his notes by his pupil Zbynek Vostřák.

His Nonet op. 43 (though left incomplete at the time of his death) was composed between January and February 1945. It was orchestrated by František Hertl and premiered in December 1945.

== Works (selection) ==
=== Piano ===
- 1910 Theme and variations op.13

=== Opera ===
- 1909 Ilseino srdce (Ilsea's Heart)
- 1932 Smrt Kmotřička, Op.30 (Godmother Death)
- 1944 Tří vlasy děda Vševěda (Three Hairs of an Old Wise Man)

=== Orchestra works ===
- 1904/1911 Scherzo Capriccio op.6
- 1909 Ideals, a symphonic epic op.11
- 1914 Symphony for violin and orchestra op.20
- 1918/1920 Demon Symphony op.23
- 1921 Renaissance Symphony op.15
- 1938 Spring Symphony op.38
- 1941 Revolution Overture. Op.39

=== Chamber music ===
- 1903 first string quartet in D minor op.3
- 1910 second string quartet in E♭ major op.12
- 1912 violin sonata in D minor op.17
- 1915 piano quartet op.22
- 1936 third string quartet op.37
- 1945 Nonet (incomplete) op.43

== Sources ==
- Stanley Sadie (Ed.) The New Grove Dictionary of Music & Musicians. 1980.
- Darryl Lyman: Great Jews in Music. Jonathan David Publishers, New York N.Y. 1986,
