= 1953 Plzeň uprising =

Demonstrations in Plzeň against currency reform

- Part of the Cold War
| Date | 31 May – 2 June 1953 |
| Location | Plzeň, Czechoslovakia |
| Result | Uprising suppressed |

Belligerents
| Czechoslovakia; Czechoslovak People's Army; People Militia; Public Security (VB); State Security (StB) | Demonstrators |

Strength
| 8,000 policemen 2,500 soldiers 80 tanks | 20,000 people |

Casualties and losses
| 48 injured | 220 injured 650 arrested |

The 1953 Plzeň uprising occurred when workers in the Czechoslovak city of Plzeň revolted in violent protest for three days, from 31 May to 2 June, against the currency reforms of state party, the Communist Party of Czechoslovakia. The estimated number of casualties is 200 injured, none fatally.

== Background ==
After the communist party took over power in 1948 it started to concentrate production on heavy industry, especially in armament production. The agricultural sector was forcibly collectivised. But these policies led to shortages of customer goods, especially food, accompanied by an inflation of 28 percent. The government's reaction was to increase the prices of state-supplied goods at the start of 1953. This led to growing disaffection among people, and to short-lived strikes.

The next step to be implemented was a currency reform, which amounted to a devaluation of savings. All savings were devalued in the ratio of fifty to one, all salaries in the ratio of five to one – small groups of people were exempted. All obligations of the state were abolished. Rationing of food at subsidized prices was stopped and work quotas increased. The reform was announced on 31 May at 22:00, after months of rumors and denials by state representatives.

=== Plzeň ===
Plzeň is a city in western Bohemia with large concentration of heavy industry, the largest factory being the famous Škoda Works. In the previous years and decades, the city saw many strike actions by workers demanding improvement of their living standards. Many of the strikes were led by the Communist party itself.

As long as the Party's reforms after 1948 favoured the workers in heavy industry, there was no reason to expect troubles. But in 1953 the factory management of Škoda Works deliberately paid off the wages for May one week earlier - thus reducing their values by 80% after the currency reform was announced.

== Uprising ==
News of the reform spread quickly among night shift workers in a plant of the Škoda Works in Plzeň, who then went on strike. The next day, in the morning, they decided to march to the city centre. Around noon the people attacked the city hall, and started to build barricades in the streets, and destroyed symbols of the communist party. Posters and slogans asking for the end of single party rule appeared.

Some of the local communists and uniformed policemen had joined or were forced to join the rebellion, and 2,000 students had joined too. Nearby Bory prison was attacked with intention of releasing the prisoners, but the attack failed. No central leadership of the uprising was established; its actions were chaotic and uncoordinated. To suppress the uprising, strong reinforcements were called to the city, consisting of armed units of the Border Guard, the Czechoslovak People's Army, the People's Militia, the StB and the troops of the Ministry of National Security. During the afternoon, these units gradually regained control of the city, and in the evening there were only isolated skirmishes.

The government sent two police battalions totalling about 8,000 men, and an army unit of 2,500 men and 80 tanks to suppress the rebellion. During street fights about 220 rebels were injured. During the afternoon of 2 June, the last insurgents barricaded themselves in factories and gave up. Over 2,000 people were taken prisoner immediately and martial law was imposed. The leaders of the uprising were promptly tried and sentenced to lengthy prison terms, one of whom was later executed. Communists and militiamen who had participated in the revolt were treated especially harshly.

=== Other cities ===
Strikes had started in 19 large industrial plants in Bohemia and Moravia, in industrial cities such as Kladno and Ostrava. These strikes didn't turn violent and ended within a week. An estimated 360,000 workers had gone on strike; up to 250,000 of them had demonstrated in the streets.

== Aftermath ==
The leaders of the Communist party decided to present the event as having been provoked by agents of imperialism and this remained the official explanation until 1989. The party was ordered to purge members suspected of "social-democratism" or of low levels of loyalty. The army stated that any future uprising would be suppressed immediately.

On 8 June the measures instituted on 31 May were recalled, except for the currency reform; also prices were reduced somewhat. The uprising and the wider wave of strikes forced the Communist Party of Czechoslovakia to reconsider its priorities and, together with pressure from Moscow, contributed to a tentative shift towards a “New Course” focused on improving workers’ living standards. In September 1953, the government announced retail price reductions and plans to construct 40,000 new homes in 1954. Between autumn 1953 and autumn 1956, retail prices were reduced six times, while personal consumption increased by 14 percent in 1954.

No further violent uprising occurred in Czechoslovakia until the Warsaw Pact invasion of 1968. The Velvet Revolution (1989) that ended the power of the communist party was mostly bloodless. Detailed knowledge of the 1953 events in Plzeň was and still is relatively low among the Czech public. The shaken trust in the stability of the currency lasted for decades.

== Sources ==
Newspapers

- Pfaff, I. (22 May 2003). "Weg mit der Partei!". Die Zeit (in German). Hamburg.

Journals

- Kramer, M. (1999). "The Early Post-Stalin Succession Struggle and Upheavals in East-Central Europe (Part 1)". Journal of Cold War Studies. 1 (1): 17–22, "The Plzen Rebellion". doi:10.1162/15203970152521881. S2CID 57565942.
- McDermott, K. (2010). "Popular Resistance in Communist Czechoslovakia: The Plzeň Uprising, June 1953". Contemporary European History. 19 (4): 287–307. doi:10.1017/S096077731000024X.
