= List of prisons in the Czech Republic =

The following list of prisons in the Czech Republic lists all prisons run by the Prison Service of the Czech Republic (Vězeňská služba České republiky).

As of the end of 2006 there were 18,574 prisoners in the Czech Republic (17,649 men, 925 women). 2,378 of them were waiting for trial. More details can be found on .

== Remand prisons ==
- Brno Remand Prison (Vazební věznice Brno)
- České Budějovice Remand Prison (Vazební věznice České Budějovice)
- Hradec Králové Remand Prison (Vazební věznice Hradec Králové)
- Liberec Remand Prison (Vazební věznice Liberec)
- Litoměřice Remand Prison (Vazební věznice Litoměřice)
- Olomouc Remand Prison (Vazební věznice Olomouc)
- Ostrava Remand Prison (Vazební věznice Ostrava)
- Prague Pankrác Remand Prison (Vazební věznice Praha Pankrác)
- Prague Ruzyně Remand Prison (Vazební věznice Praha Ruzyně)
- Teplice Remand Prison (Vazební věznice Teplice)
- Znojmo Remand Prison (Vazební věznice Znojmo)

== Prisons ==
- Bělušice Prison (Věznice Bělušice), Most District
- Břeclav Prison (Věznice Břeclav)
- Drahonice Prison (Věznice Drahonice), Louny District
- Heřmanice Prison (Věznice Heřmanice), Ostrava
- Horní Slavkov Prison (Věznice Horní Slavkov)
- Jiřice Prison (Věznice Jiřice), Nymburk District
- Karviná Prison (Věznice Karviná)
- Kuřim Prison (Věznice Kuřim)
- Kynšperk nad Ohří Prison (Věznice Kynšperk nad Ohří)
- Mírov Prison (Věznice Mírov)
- Nové Sedlo Prison (Věznice Nové Sedlo), Louny District
- Odolov Prison (Věznice Odolov), Trutnov District
- Opava Prison (Věznice Opava)
- Oráčov Prison (Věznice Oráčov), Rakovník District
- Ostrov Prison (Věznice Ostrov)
- Pardubice Prison (Věznice Pardubice)
- Plzeň Prison (Věznice Plzeň, formerly known as Věznice Bory)
- Příbram Prison (Věznice Příbram)
- Rýnovice Prison (Věznice Rýnovice), Jablonec nad Nisou)
- Stráž pod Ralskem Prison (Věznice Stráž pod Ralskem)
- Světlá nad Sázavou Prison (Věznice Světlá nad Sázavou)
- Valdice Prison (Věznice Valdice)
- Vinařice Prison (Věznice Vinařice), Kladno District
- Všehrdy Prison (Věznice Všehrdy), Chomutov District
