= Princ Dobroshi =

Kosovo Albanian mobster

Princ Dobroshi (born 2 April 1964 in Peja, KS Kosovo , SFR Yugoslavia) is a Kosovar-Albanian crime boss, formerly active in Europe in the 1990s dealing with drug trafficking and arms smuggling. As of 2006 he is living in Kosovo.

== Crime career ==
In 1993 he was caught in Norway and in 1994 sentenced to 14 years in prison for heroin trafficking (other charges were pending in Sweden and Denmark). In a well coordinated operation he escaped from the Ullersmo prison in 1997. After his escape he relocated to Croatia, where he underwent facial plastic surgery in 1998. He moved to the Czech Republic where his group soon dominated in drug trafficking. On 23 February 1999 he was arrested in Prague.

On 6 September 2000 he was to be interrogated by the court at Ringerike District Jail, due to the high security aspect. The interrogations were canceled after the bus, carrying the court members, crashed with a truck, killing 3 of its members.

The criminal underground had planned armed attack on the Pankrác Prison but in August 1999 Dobroshi was extradited to Norway to complete his sentence. He was paroled and deported for "good behavior" in January 2005. Then he returned into the Czech Republic and stayed there for three months, until his visa expired. Later, he returned to Peć, Kosovo.

He has admitted friendship with Arfan Qadeer Bhatti who was arrested in Norway on charges of planning to terrorize Israeli and American embassies in Oslo, Norway.

As of September 2006, he was living in Kosovo while his Albanian wife and their two children lived in Prague. An investigation of terror suspects in Norway in September 2006 discovered contacts between one of the suspects and Dobroshi (they met in Pristina in 2005). MF Dnes, a newspaper in the Czech Republic, speculated about possibility of Dobroshi taking revenge and organizing a terror attack in Prague. In an interview the next day, Dobroshi acknowledged he knew the person but denied any involvement.
