= Dejvická Farmers' Market =

Dejvická Farmers Market is located in Prague near Dejvická Metro Station. It is open on Saturdays from March until November. Offerings includes fruits, vegetables, bread, pies, juices, and seafood.

== Website ==
- Market website
