= Zbýšov =

- Town
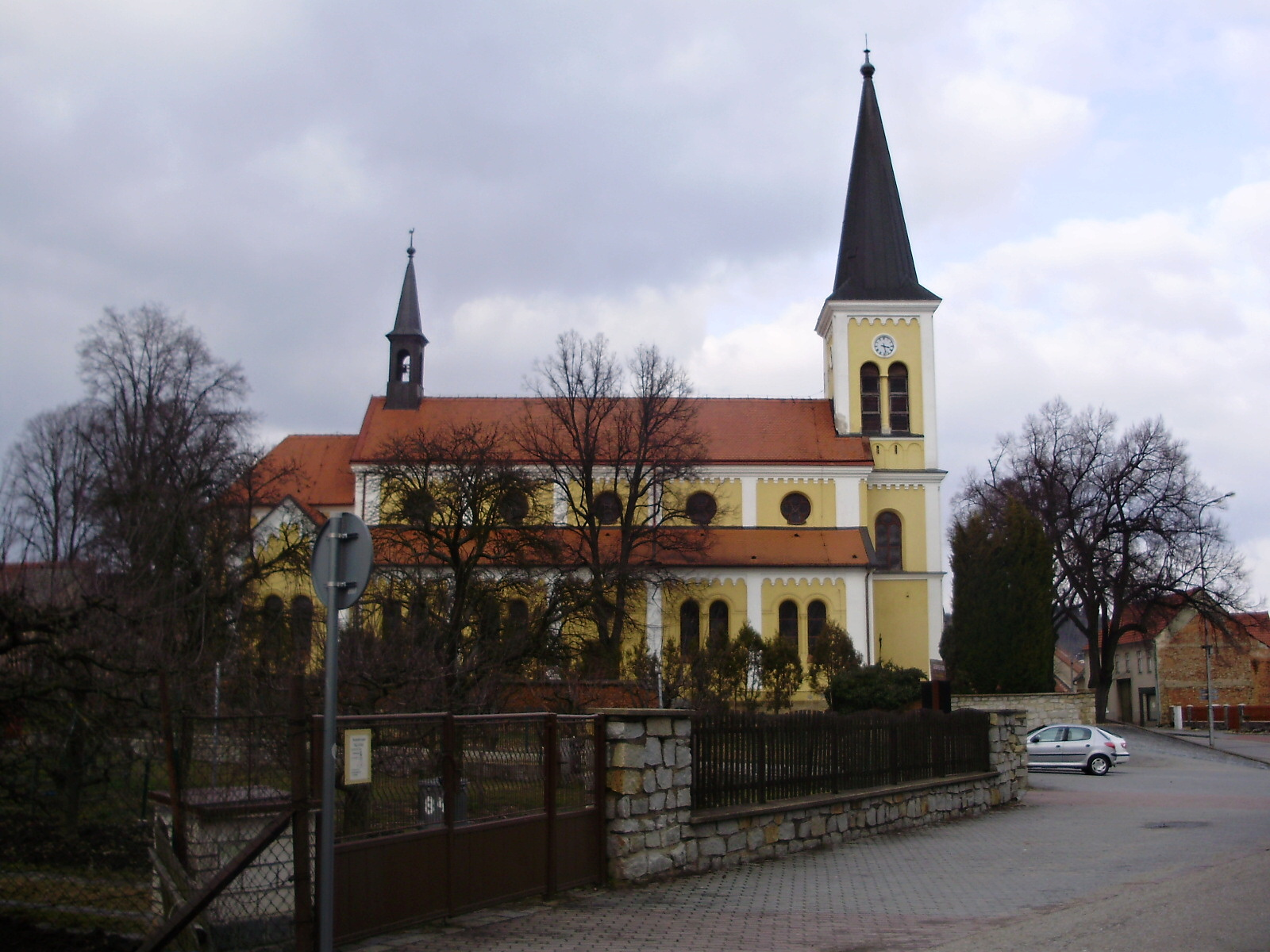
- Church of Saint Martin

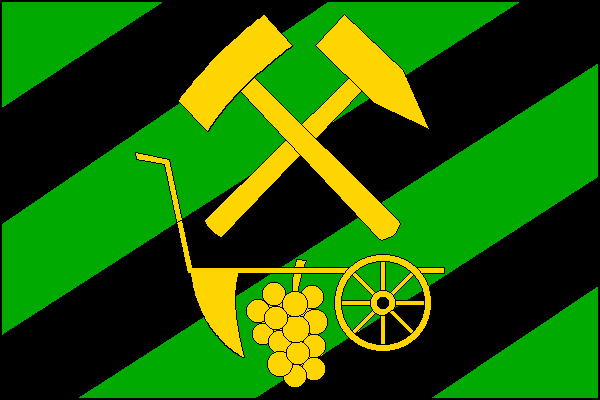
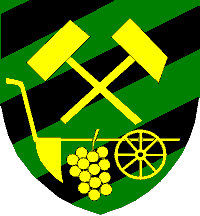
- Flag Coat of arms

- Location in the Czech Republic
- Coordinates: 49°9′19″N 16°20′58″E
- Country: Czech Republic
- Region: South Moravian
- District: Brno-Country
- First mentioned: 1280

Government
  - Mayor: Jakub Dobšík

Area
  - Total: 6.01 km^{2} (2.32 sq mi)
- Elevation: 348 m (1,142 ft)

Population (2026-01-01)
  - Total: 3,707
  - Density: 617/km^{2} (1,600/sq mi)
- Time zone: UTC+1 (CET)
  - Summer (DST): UTC+2 (CEST)
- Postal code: 664 11
- Website: www.mestozbysov.cz

Zbýšov (Czech pronunciation: [ˈzbiːʃof]) is a town in Brno-Country District in the South Moravian Region of the Czech Republic. It has about 3,700 inhabitants.

== Geography ==
Zbýšov is located about 18 kilometres (11 mi) west of Brno. It lies on the border between the Křižanov Highlands and Boskovice Furrow. The highest point is at 407 m (1,335 ft) above sea level.

== History ==
The first written mention of Zbýšov is from 1280, when the settlement of Zbýšov was given to the Oslavany monastery by Bohuš of Drahotuše, the supreme marshal. The village belonged to the Oslavany estate and shared its owners. In 1790, Zbýšov had 53 houses and 313 inhabitants. Until the end of the 18th century, Zbýšov was an insignificant settlement, which changed with the discovery of bituminous coal. In 1820, a mining company called Láska Boží (i.e. "God's blessing") was founded. Since then, the importance of Zbýšov and the entire area has grown.

The Simson mine was established in 1848 and coal was mined there from 1853 to 1925. In the mid-19th century, the village acquired an industrial character. In 1950, the construction of miners' apartments began. In the 1960s and 1970s, a new infrastructure of the town was built, including another school, a kindergarten and a policlinic. In 1965, Zbýšov was promoted to a town.

The Jindřich I mine operated from 1854 to 1970. In 1969, the operation of the Jindřich II mine began. It became the deepest black coal mine in Central Europe with a depth of 1,550 m (5,090 ft). The operation of the mine ceased in 1991, which was the end of mining in the entire Rosice-Oslavany mining region.

== Demographics ==
Historical population

Year	Pop.	±%
1869	1,051	—
1880	1,328	+26.4%
1890	1,624	+22.3%
1900	1,796	+10.6%
1910	1,884	+4.9%

Year	Pop.	±%
1921	1,894	+0.5%
1930	2,028	+7.1%
1950	2,215	+9.2%
1961	3,871	+74.8%
1970	4,358	+12.6%

Year	Pop.	±%
1980	4,484	+2.9%
1991	4,257	−5.1%
2001	3,940	−7.4%
2011	3,728	−5.4%
2021	3,656	−1.9%

Source: Censuses

== Transport ==
There are no railways or major roads passing through the municipality.

== Sport ==
Zbýšov has a small aquapark with five swimming pools and a water slide. It was built in 1998.

== Sights ==
The main landmark of Zbýšov is the Church of Saint Martin. It was built in the Neo-Romanesque style in 1893–1894. It replaced an older church, which had insufficient capacity and was also damaged by coal mining under the church.

== Notable people ==
- Ivan Honl (1866–1936), bacteriologist and serologist
