= Alois Weiss =

German executioner

Alois Weiss (or: Weiß) (16 October 1906 in Ruma, Austria-Hungary – 26 February 1969 in Straubing, Germany) was the executioner at the Gestapo Pankrác prison in Prague during the Second World War.

The former storehouse helper from Munich, and assistant to the Munich executioner Reichhart, was the chief executioner of the Pankrác prison from February 1943. Until 1945, 1,079 persons were executed in the so-called Sekyrárna (axe room). His assistants were the Czechs Alfred Engel, Robert Týfa and Jan Křížek, who changed his name to Johann Kreuz. Later, the Gestapo changed the assistants; newly added were Antonín Nerad from Prague-Braník and Otto Schweiger, the brother-in-law of Weiss. After the war, Weiss lived in the Federal Republic of Germany. In the 1970s, he requested a public pension from the Czech government, citing his work as a public servant for them. He died in Straubing, 62 years old.

During executions, the executioners mostly followed this procedure: one held the hands of the condemned to prevent him from moving when the guillotine blade descended. The second stood at the feet of the prisoner and untied his hands after the beheading. The two additional assistants pulled the body to a trunk to the right of the place of execution, took the head out of the basket and laid it next to the body. After that, Weiss wrote in the execution book the name of his victim. As can be gathered from the notes, an execution took three minutes. The victims were cremated in Prague's Strašnice Crematorium.
