= Josef Bílý =

Czech army general and resistance fighter

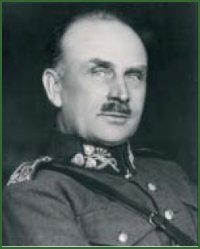
Josef Bílý

Josef Bílý (30 June 1872 – 28 September 1941) was a Czech general and commander of the Czechoslovak national armed forces.

== Early life and education ==
Bílý was born in Zbonín-Ochoz, and attended the State Real Gymnasium in Písek from 1883 to 1888.

== Military career ==
=== Service in the Austro-Hungarian army ===
After completing his studies at gymnasium, he studied at the Austro-Hungarian Army's infantry cadet school in Trieste from 1888 to 1892. Joining the 15th Infantry Regiment in Tarnopol as a cadet in 1892, he was promoted to the rank of lieutenant in 1894. From 1898 to 1900 he attended the Military College in Vienna, after which he served in the 7th Infantry Division in Osijek (Slavonia), then in Lviv and, beginning in 1906, in Trieste, having risen to the rank of captain in 1903. He was an instructor in tactics and training at the cadet school in Vienna from 1908 to 1910, after which he served in the 4th Infantry Regiment in Vienna.

After being promoted to major on 1 August 1914, he commanded the battalion on the Russian front of the First World War beginning on August 18 of that year. He participated in fighting in Galicia and the Carpathians, and on 3 July 1915, he was wounded and sent to recover at the field hospital in Ljubljana. After serving for six months in the military government of Lublin he was appointed battalion commander in Brixen. In 1916 he became a lieutenant colonel and, beginning in February 1917, he commanded a special unit on the front at Asiago. In June 1918, he took command of the 74th Bosnia-Herzegovina Infantry Regiment, and in this role participated in the offensive at Asiago in Italy.

=== Service in the Czechoslovak army ===
After the establishment of Czechoslovakia, Josef Bílý took part in the formation of the Czechoslovak Army in Prague and on November 28, 1918, was officially named a colonel in the Army, thereafter holding positions at the regional and garrison headquarters in České Budějovice. In 1917 he joined the General Staff. Beginning in the spring of 1920, he served briefly as commander of the regiment in Uzhhorod and then, from 1920 to 1922, as commander of the 16th infantry brigade in Frýdek. He was promoted to the rank of general on 16 December 1921, and appointed Deputy Commander of the Provincial Military Command in Brno.

Between 1923 and 1928 he commanded the 6th Infantry Division and in 1924 completed a course for generals in Versailles, France. Promoted on 16 December 1927, to the rank of brigadier general, he served from 1928 to 1935 as commander of the Provincial Military Command of Bohemia in Prague. On 3 April 1928, he was promoted to the rank of divisional general and on 26 June 1931, to the rank of General of the Army. After 47 years in the uniformed services, he retired on 1 July 1935.

=== Anti-Nazi resistance ===
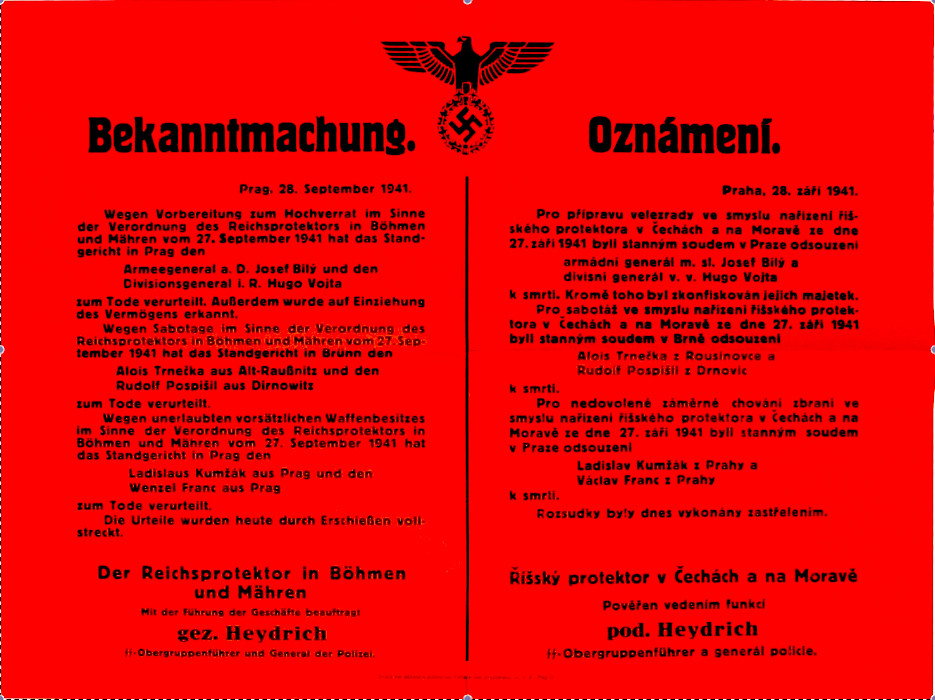
Notice by Reinhard Heydrich announcing the execution of Gen. Josef Bílý and other members of the resistance

Immediately after the Germans began occupying Czech territory in March 1939, Bily joined the resistance. He became a member of the group known as the Council of Elders, among whose other members were generals Alois Eliáš, Hugo Vojta, and Sergej Vojcechovský. The formation of this group led to the establishment of an illegal anti-Nazi military resistance organization, Obrana národa (ON), at the end of March 1939. On 30 June 1939, Bílý became its commander, subordinate only to the Provincial Commander in Bohemia, General Hugo Vojta, and the Provincial Commander in Moravia, Bohuslav Všetička. After a series of arrests, the Gestapo managed to partially paralyze ON. From December 1939, Bily lived in hiding. On 14 November 1940 he was arrested by the Gestapo in a cottage on Harus Hill in the village of Radňovice near Nové Město na Moravě and imprisoned in Prague at Pankrác and Terezín.

On the first day of his tenure as Reichsprotektor in Bohemia and Moravia, 27 September 1941, Reinhard Heydrich, seeking to break the resistance of Czech patriots, declared a civil emergency. In this he stated that the military court in Prague had found Bílý and Division General Hugo Vojta guilty of treason and sentenced them to death. Bílý was executed on 28 September 1941, at 9 pm by a firing squad. On the scaffold, he refused to wear a blindfold. His last words were: “Long live the Czechoslovak Republic! Dogs, fire!"

== Honors ==
=== List of decorations ===
- 1898 Jubilee Commemorative Medal
- 1907 Military Merit Medal, Bronze Medal
- 1908 Military Jubilee Cross
- 1912 Military Merit Cross, III. Class
- 1913 Military official badge, III. Class for officers
- 1914 Military Merit Medal, silver medal
- 1915 Military Merit Cross, III. Class
- 1915 Order of Iron Crown, III. Class - knight
- 1916 Order of Leopold, V. Class - officer
- 1918 Order of Iron Crown, II. Class - Commander
- 1923 Order of reborn Poland, IV. Class
- 1924 Order of the Legion of Honor, IV. Class - officer
- 1925 Order of Italian Crown, III. Class
- 1925 Order of the Romanian star, III. Class - Commander
- 1926 Medvědobijce Order, II. Class - Commander
- 1926 Order of St. Sava, II. Class (Serbia)
- 1929 Order of the Nile, II. Class
- 1932 Order of Romanian Crown, II. class
- 1933 Order of Yugoslav Crown, II. Class
- 1945 Czechoslovak War Cross 1939, in memoriam
- 1992 The Order of Milan Rastislav Štefánik, II. Class, in memoriam
- 2008 Cross of Defense of the Ministry of Defense of the Czech Republic, in memoriam
- 2018 Order of the White Lion, First Class Military Group, in memoriam

=== Memorials ===
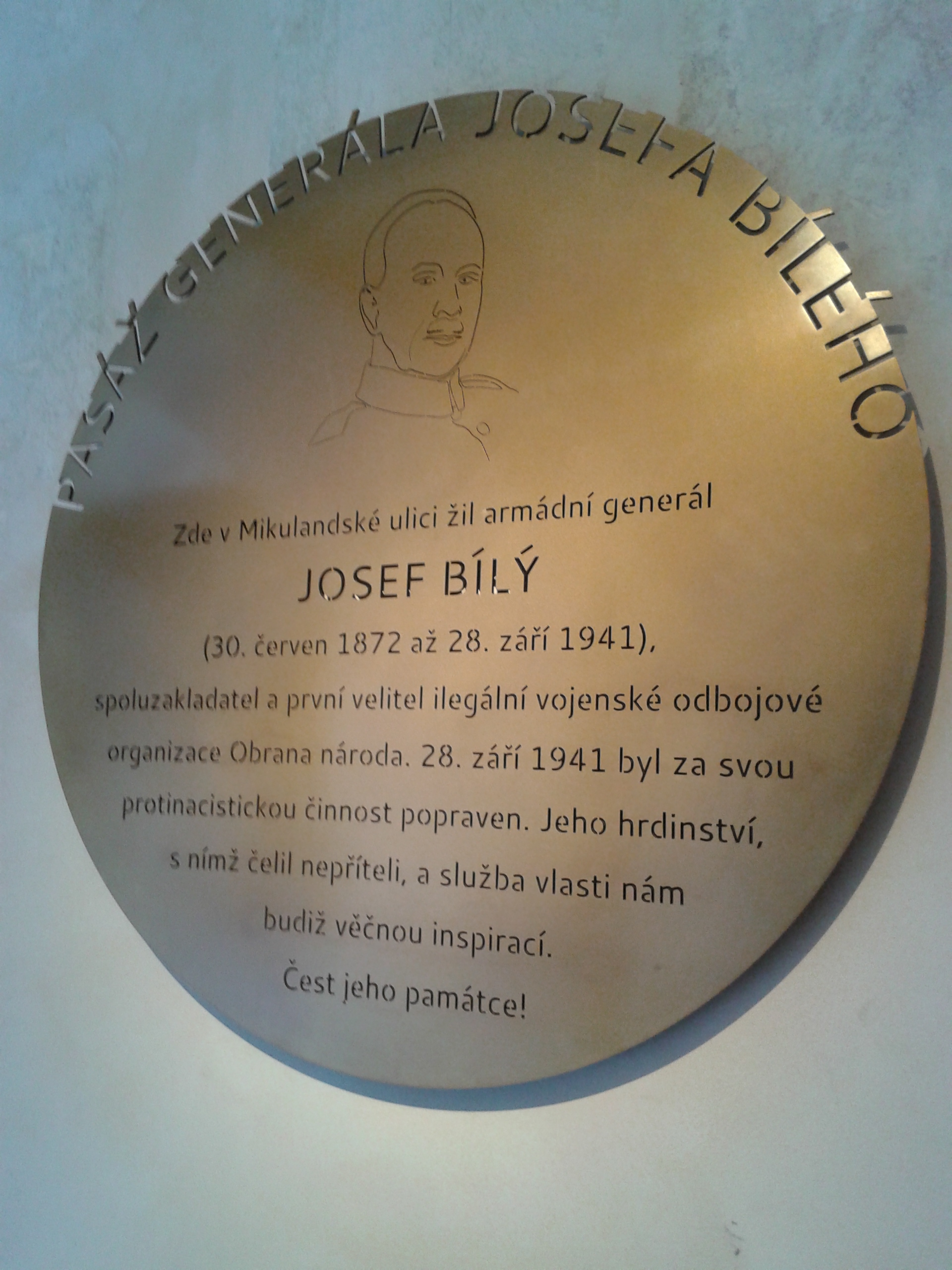
Memorial plaque in the passage that connects Národní třída with Mikulandská Street in Prague

- A plaque on the house at 801/17 Verdunská Street, 160 00 Prague 6-Bubeneč), where General Josef Bílý lived with his wife Hana Bílá until 1937.
- A commemorative plaque (unveiled on 16 May 2009) on the outer wall of the chapel in the military cemetery near the Čížovská road near the South Bohemian Písek (northwest of Písek about 3 km from the city centre) towards the village Čížová.
- A memorial plaque in the riding hall of the former Ruzyně Barracks. The building is located on the premises of the military unit in Prague-Ruzyně.
- At the Old Town Hall (in January 2018), the deputy mayor of Prague 1, Oldřich Lomecký, assumed the honorary citizenship granted to General Josef Bílý (in memoriam).
- On 28 June 2018, two stone commemorative plaques were ceremonially unveiled on the house at 122/4 Mikulandská Street in Prague 1. The first one commemorates Bílý, who lived there 1937 to 1939 with his wife, Hana. The second plaque commemorates the establishment of the military illegal resistance organization Defense of the Nation in March 1939, which took place in Bílý's apartment in this house.
