= Augustin Přeučil =

Czech pilot

- Born: 3 July 1914; Třebsín, Bohemia, Austria-Hungary
- Died: 13 April 1947 (aged 32); Pankrác Prison, Prague, Czechoslovakia
- Cause of death: Execution by hanging

Augustin Přeučil (3 July 1914 – 14 April 1947) was a Czech military pilot, who during World War II worked as an intelligence agent for Nazi Germany. In 1941, whilst serving with the British Royal Air Force, he stole a fighter aircraft from England, and flew it to Occupied Europe where he surrendered it to the German authorities. He later worked in Occupied Central Europe with the Gestapo. Shortly after the war he was executed in Prague by the Czechoslovak authorities for treason.

== Early life ==
Přeučil was born on 3 July 1914 in the village of Třebsín in Bohemia, Austria-Hungary (today part of Krňany, Czech Republic). At the age of 21, he enrolled at the Civil Aviation School, from which he was conscripted for military service into the Czechoslovak Army, which sent him to train as a pilot at the Military Aviation School in Prostějov. In 1939, on the outbreak of World War II, he was serving as a reconnaissance pilot in Air Regiment 6 of the Czechoslovak Air Force.

== Agent for Nazi Germany in World War II ==
When the armed forces of Nazi Germany invaded Czechoslovakia in March 1939, Přeučil attempted to illegally cross the border from the Protectorate of Bohemia and Moravia seeking to leave the country and emigrate to South America, but he was arrested by German officials, and whilst imprisoned recruited as a secret agent by the Gestapo (the officer who recruited him was Oskar Fleischer), who trained him in espionage. He was subsequently freed and sent on an espionage mission with orders to join the emigre Czechoslovak military diaspora that was fleeing their country after its occupation to Western Europe, particularly seeking to fall into the company of any groups of air force personnel, and report back to Germany on their activities.

After a brief period in Poland, Přeučil, in company with a group of nearly 200 other Czechoslovak military personnel, travelled to France in August 1939 intending to enlist with the French Army's Foreign Legion. However, on arrival there the outbreak of World War II led to the French Government ordering all trained Czechoslovak aircrew that it was aware of in its territory, who were volunteering to enlist with the French Armed Forces to fight Nazi Germany, to be sent to Chartres to train for service with the French Air Force. On arrival, Přeučil received flight training on the Morane-Saulnier, and reported intelligence information on the French Air Force back to the German intelligence via Reich agents operating in France. After the fall of France he was evacuated to the United Kingdom in June 1940, where he joined a newly created Czechoslovak squadron of the Royal Air Force.

In England, Přeučil served in a number of non-combat training and maintenance squadrons of the Royal Air Force (RAF), and in July 1941 he even married an English woman. Working with the RAF as a fighter pilot-instructor in late 1941, he was attached to No. 55 Operational Training Unit, based at RAF Usworth near Sunderland. On 18 September 1941 Přeučil took off from Unsworth's airfield in Hawker Hurricane type MK IIa, Serial number W9147, and flew out over the North Sea in company with another Hurricane flown by a trainee Polish pilot to practise air-combat tactics. Whilst engaged in the manoeuvres Přeučil reported over the radio that his aircraft was out of control, and breaking away into the clouds, flew the aeroplane to Occupied Europe, landing in the countryside near Bastogne, Belgium. He was taken by local Belgian civilians as a downed RAF pilot, who sheltered him, and handed him over to members of the Belgian Resistance, but Přeučil soon afterwards handed himself into the German authorities in the vicinity, betraying the locals who had sheltered him to the Gestapo, who arrested them. The Hurricane fighter Přeučil had landed in was recovered in an airworthy condition by the Luftwaffe, which studied it to assist with their air war with the RAF. The aeroplane later ended up in Nazi Germany's Museum of Transport and Technology in Berlin.

At the time of Přeučil's disappearance the RAF assumed he had crashed and died at sea. It was not until the Belgian Resistance reported to London the incident of his arrival in their territory, and behaviour which had cost the lives of two Belgians who had been executed by the Gestapo, that the true circumstances of his disappearance over the North Sea became apparent to the British authorities.

In September 1941, having been debriefed by the Abwehr with all the information about the British military that he had to give, and been generously financially rewarded for his actions, Přeučil returned to Protectorate of Bohemia and Moravia, and for the remainder of the war he acted as an undercover agent for the Gestapo there, infiltrating and betraying Czech Resistance movements. From March 1943 to May 1944 he was planted in Theresienstadt prison where, posing as a captured Czech R.A.F. pilot, he gathered information on Czech political prisoners and spied on prisoners of war. In 1944 he was reportedly working for the Gestapo in Prague, and assisted the Wehrmacht in interrogating captured Czech and Polish Royal Air Force aircrews who had been shot down over occupied Europe.

== Post-war trial and execution ==
On 19 May 1945, eleven days after the fall of Nazi Germany, Přeučil was arrested in Prague as a known Gestapo agent. He was at first tried by military court, but his case was referred to the civilian People's Court in Prague. After two years of investigation he was tried by Chief Public Prosecutor Jaroslav Drábek on 3 March 1947 on charges of High Treason against Czechoslovakia, found guilty and sentenced to death. He was executed at the age of 32 by hanging at Pankrác Prison on 14 April 1947.
