= Roman Týc =

Czech artist (born 1974)

David Brudňák (born 1974), commonly known as Roman Týc and also known as David Hons, is a Czech artist known for his guerrilla art work in "public space" or "street art". Týc is a co-founder of the Ztohoven art group and of the visual art group PureA. He helped with the formation of alternative culture centre Ateliery Trafacka (Trafacka studios).

== Evolution ==
1992-95 he started his street art period as a graffiti writer (ROOT). In 1997 he became obsessed by the new phenomenon of Vjing (KINOKIO). A year later he created a VJs group LOOX, which became the PureA project a few years later.

=== Graffiti ===
Although the trail he left on the graffiti community is not really deep, Czech scene consider him one of the graffiti pioneers. He wrote his first tag in 1992. Graffiti at that time was an early street art. Today it has become an integral part of the art in the public space.

=== VJing ===
By the year 1997 he had dedicated himself fully to VJing. VJing as a discipline of art could rise in the late 1990s due to descending prices of video projectors which had been too pricey until then. Together with a few others, Roman has undergone a significant evolution and in its end they definitely left behind the computer as a tool of their VJing. They invented a brand new style of Living VideoPerformance and started calling it PureA. Roman's impression on the VJ scene is unmistakable. For his live video performances he uses paintings, drawings but also printed materials which he shoots live with his cameras and mixes the pictures using video mixer on the fly. This way he creates an actual video collage reflecting his moods and feelings of the moment. What has started as just a devotee idea turned lately in a respectful project that has brought back prematurely lost techniques of video art.

== Cases monitored by media ==
In his work there is an evident chase for experience. It is impossible to consider his works single items. But when perceiving it as a complex, it gives a hint that Roman uses himself as a tool, medium used for a research in the social space we live in. He searches for that "public space" and tries to find its boundaries. His invasive way of entering places that let him represent his thought and attitudes implies his consideration of the fact that public space may not even exist at all. No wonder he often ends up in a conflict with authorities and the law.

=== The Flood ===
One of his first appearances was his "float" on which he sailed the stormy river Vltava during the 2002 European floods in Prague. After being forced by a rescuer to leave his float after he sailed under the Charles Bridge, he reflects his experience in a short poetic movie "I River". A few other short movies and videoinstallations were made in this period.

=== The Cap Cop Cup ===
Another important case, followed by the media, was a game: Steal the cop's hat. Following the rules, he has set himself, the goal was to steal the hats of as many cops on duty as possible. He published the rules as well as the videos of playing this game on the internet. Lately he admitted he was sponsored by the Nike company for what he became a target of critics of some activist artists.

=== The CowParade ===
From May to September 2004, his cow named "Romeo 23" painted with a military green and with a red star and number 23 on its side was placed on Kinske square in Prague. The cow was a reminder of the Red Army tank Nr. 23 that took this place in the communist era and which had been pink painted by the artist David Černý in 1991. This Roman's Cow was called a disgrace to the remembrance of killed liberators of Prague in 1945. July 8, one day before the planned happening where the cow was about to be painted to pink, a duo of students showed their protest using a construction pipe to cut out the star and number from the Cow's side. They published their statement later placing it on the cow, including the letter from Mr. Klaus, president of Czech Republic who supported them. The cow ended up being bought by MPs Jan Mládek (socialists) and Jiří Dolejš (communists) at a beneficent auction. This prevented those students being prosecuted for financial loss of the company which organized the Cow Parade.

=== The Traffic Lights ===
April 8, 2007 - Roman replaced the "obedient" walker characters in 50 traffic lights in Prague for characters that intended to resemble us in unexpected situations. The pissing, shitting, drinking, lying, sitting, committing suicide with a gun, hanged, one legged, mother with a child characters were seen on traffic lights on zebra crossings in Prague.

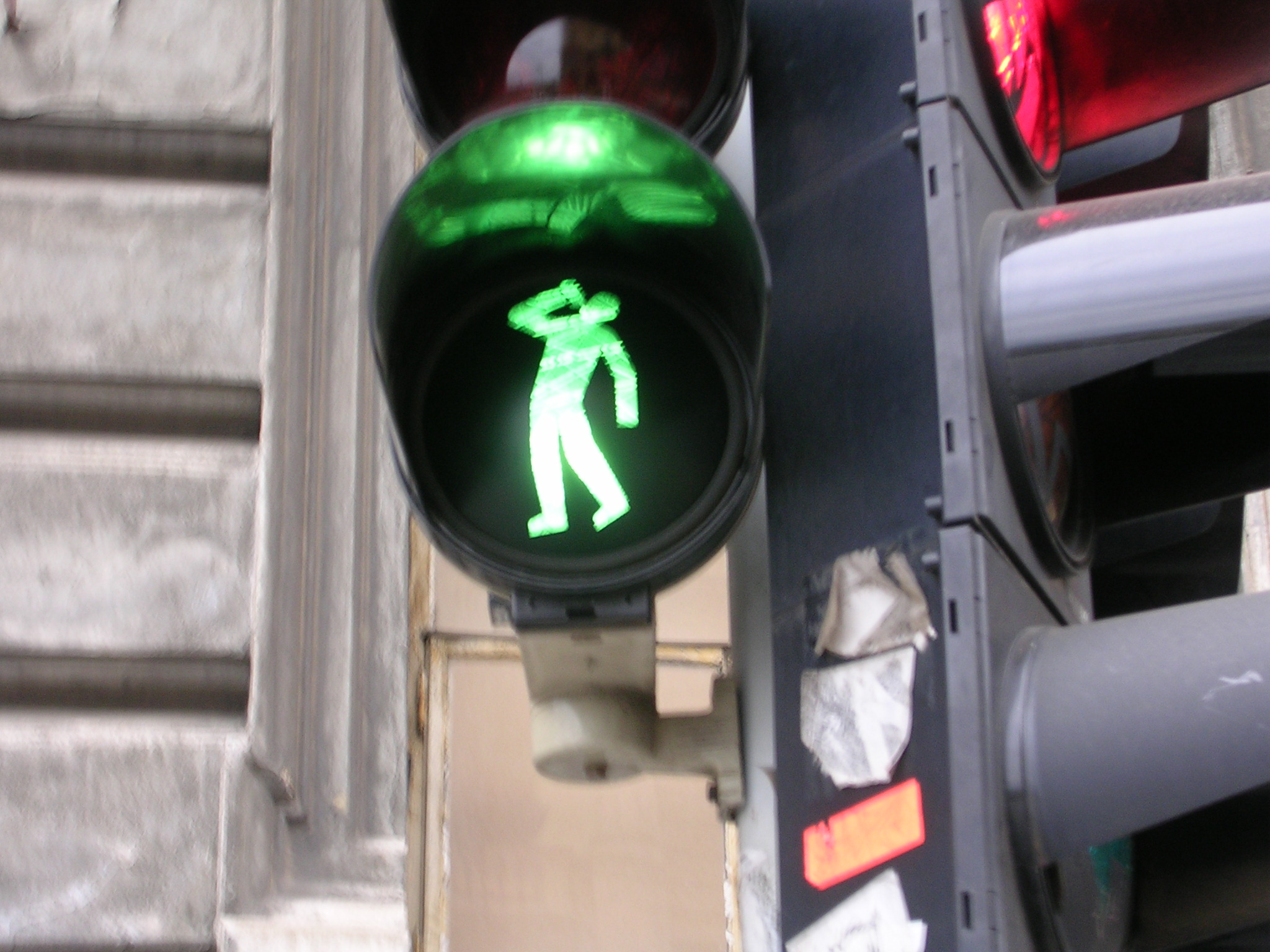
In April 2007, Týc, a member of the underground street art group Ztohoven, illegally modified traffic lights in Prague. He was jailed for one month after refusing to pay a 60,000 CZK fine.

The Czech judicial system, confused by the use of pseudonym, charged "a member of Ztohoven group - David Brudnak" of damaging the public property and summoned him to court. David Brudnak testified: "my connection to Roman Týc is very strong indeed, but not so strong that I would take his place in this case, because our physiognomy is significantly different" and applied for his right to remain silent.

In 2008, Týc was sentenced by judge Tomáš Hájek to pay a fine of CZK 60,000 and to pay damages of CZK 82,000 (altogether approx US$7,000). In case he failed to pay the fine, he would have had to serve one month in prison. On the day of the verdict Týc appeared in Czech TV newscast (CT 24) saying that he preferred imprisonment over the penalty.

In December 2011 the District Court of Prague 7 stated that David Hons had refused to pay the CZK 60,000 imposed on him three years earlier (confirmed by David Hons even before the trial by sending an open letter to his Judge) and therefore he was to serve the imprisonment.

David Hons, signed as Roman Týc, in his second open letter stated he saw his act neither as a crime nor an offense but an unselfish project that enriched a society in its time.

On February 24, 2012 Roman Týc began to serve a custodial sentence in Pankrác Prison.

A short movie made on the Traffic Lights Replacement called "Romantycke semafory" (Romantyc Traffic Lights) won the Audience Award of the SidewalkCinema 2007 Viena festival.

=== Nothing to celebrate ===
His ironic adjustment of The Velvet Revolution memorial enriched the existing hands, doing the "victory" sign with its fingers, with additional hands by each side. While on the left side new hands were performing the fascist "sieg heil" gesture, those on the right side were showing the raised middle finger in order to "fuck". All of the gestures are connected by a common date: November 17, only the year is different. Left hands bear the year 1939 when a Czech student was executed by nazis, original hands are marked 1989 and "fucking" hands are symbolizing the present, 2009.

=== Beretta sub-machine gun ===
Týc was among artists that took part in Museo Maxxi Czech art installation in 2015 in Rome, Italy. Týc illegally purchased a Beretta sub-machine gun on a Czech black market and smuggled the gun to Italy. The gun was exhibited with inscription "What the fuck was an Italian sub-machine gun doing in the Czech lands?!" According to Týc, this had a double meaning referring both to the mere illegal existence of the gun as well as to the acts committed by it. Firstly, the gun was used by German paratroopers by the end of the WW2 and thus had probably been used in killing of Czech resistance members. Secondly, it was a fully functional illegal Italian firearm in the country.

=== The Ztohoven group ===
- "The Question Mark Above The Prague Castle" (2003)
- "The Subconscious Raped" (2003)
- "The Media Reality" (2007)
- "The Citizen K." (2010)
- "Non multi sed multa" (2011)
- "The Moral Reform" (2012)

== His work ==
=== Works in a public space ===
- "Ohnívání" "(The Rotting fire)" (2003)
- "Holokunst" (2005)
- "Eskalátor" "(The Escalator)" (2006)
- "Semafory" "(Traffic Lights)" (2007)
- "Křížová cesta" "(Stations of the Cross)" (2008)
- "Pomníčky" "(Little Memorials)" (2008)
- "Není co slavit" "(Nothing To Celebrate)" (2009)

=== Video Art ===
- „Stars“ (2001)
- „Já řeka“ "I River" (2002)
- „Barvy“ "Colours" (2002)
- „Balet“ "The Ballet" (2003)
- "Paralely" "The Parallels" (2003)
- „Dveře z mého dětského pokoje“ "The Door of my Childhood Room" (2004)
- "Babička R.I.P." "R.I.P Grandmother" (2009)

=== Other ===
- "My Holidays with Ken" (r. 2004)
- "Heavy sugar" (r. 2007)

== Awards ==
- The Audience Award - The SidewalkCINEMA 2007 - "Semafory" "Traffic Lights"
- 1st place - NG 333 - "The Media Reality" for The Ztohoven group
