= Krňany =

- Municipality
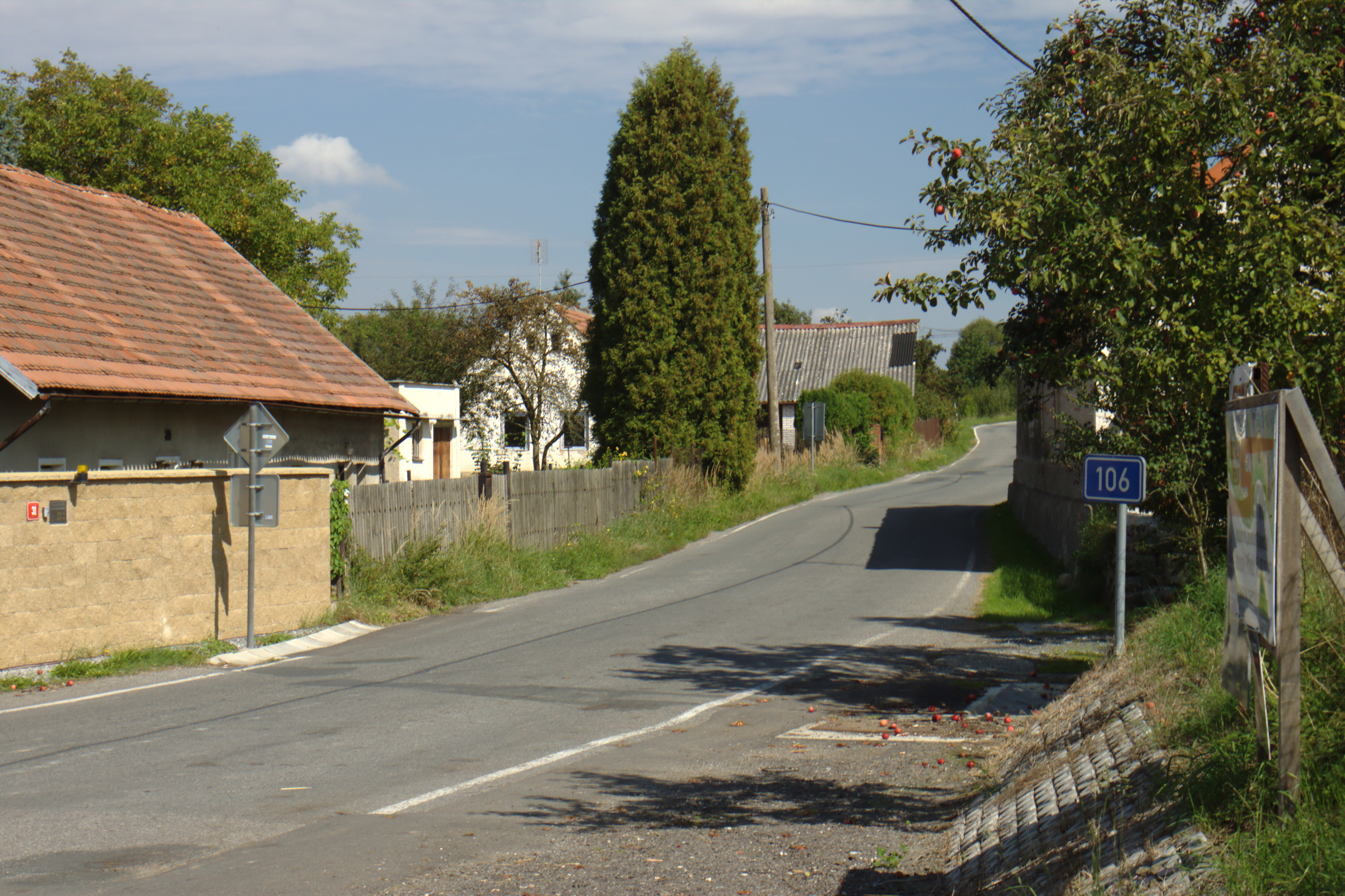
- Main road

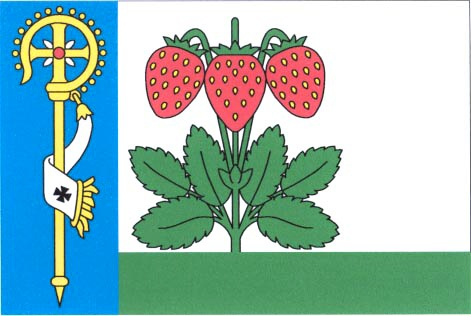
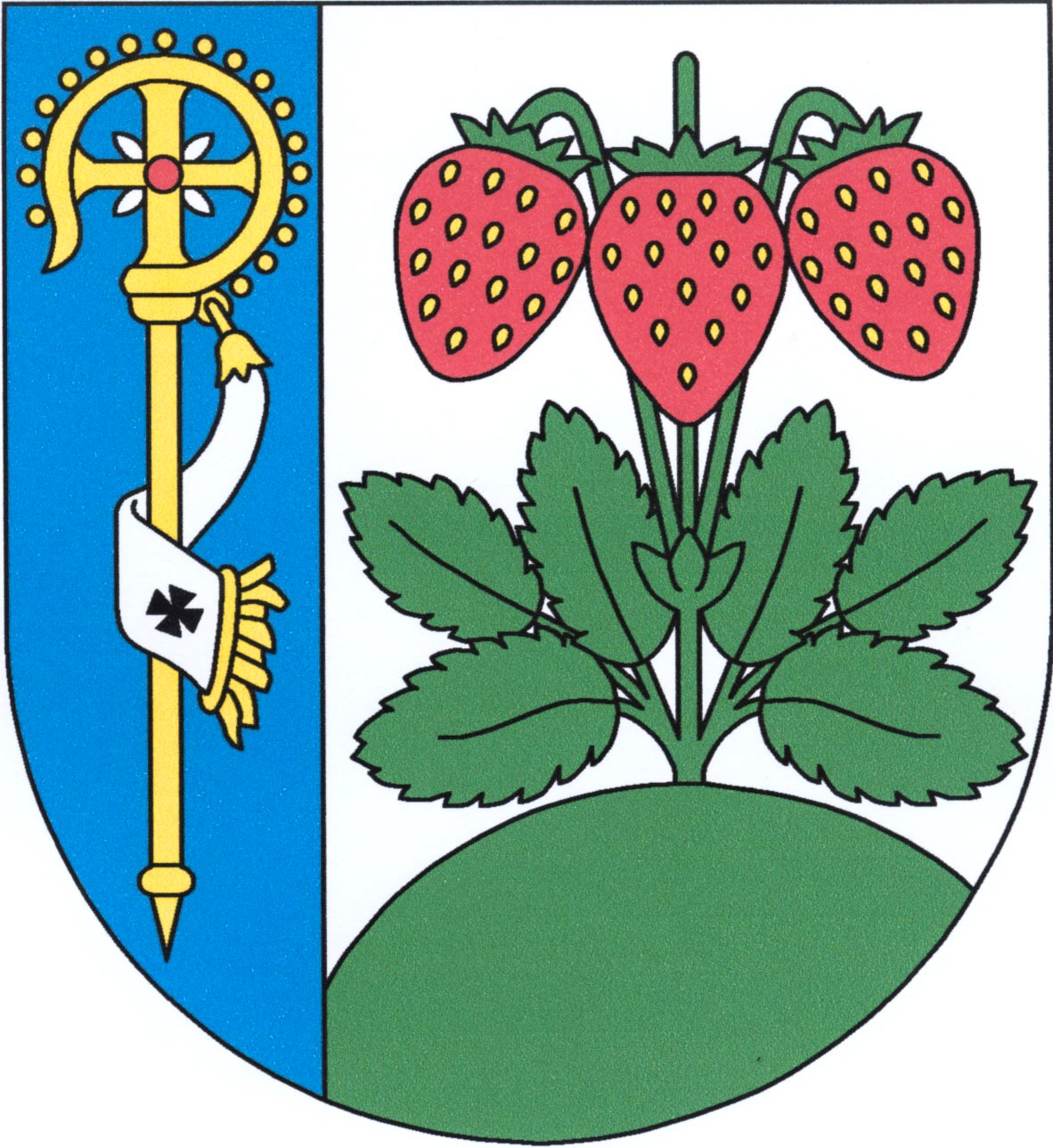
- Flag Coat of arms

- Location in the Czech Republic
- Coordinates: 49°50′42″N 14°28′39″E
- Country: Czech Republic
- Region: Central Bohemian
- District: Benešov
- First mentioned: 1061

Area
  - Total: 12.24 km^{2} (4.73 sq mi)
- Elevation: 360 m (1,180 ft)

Population (2026-01-01)
  - Total: 520
  - Density: 42/km^{2} (110/sq mi)
- Time zone: UTC+1 (CET)
  - Summer (DST): UTC+2 (CEST)
- Postal code: 257 44
- Website: www.krnany.cz

Krňany is a municipality and village in Benešov District in the Central Bohemian Region of the Czech Republic. It has about 500 inhabitants.

== Administrative division ==
Krňany consists of three municipal parts (in brackets population according to the 2021 census):

- Krňany (209)
- Teletín (94)
- Třebsín (226)

== Demographics ==
Historical population
Year	Pop.	±%
1869	706	—
1880	797	+12.9%
1890	861	+8.0%
1900	813	−5.6%
1910	843	+3.7%
1921	778	−7.7%
1930	757	−2.7%
1950	552	−27.1%
1961	562	+1.8%
1970	441	−21.5%
1980	397	−10.0%
1991	335	−15.6%
2001	328	−2.1%
2011	401	+22.3%
2021	529	+31.9%
Source: Censuses

== Notable people ==
- Augustin Přeučil (1914–1947), military pilot and spy
