= Strašín =

- Municipality
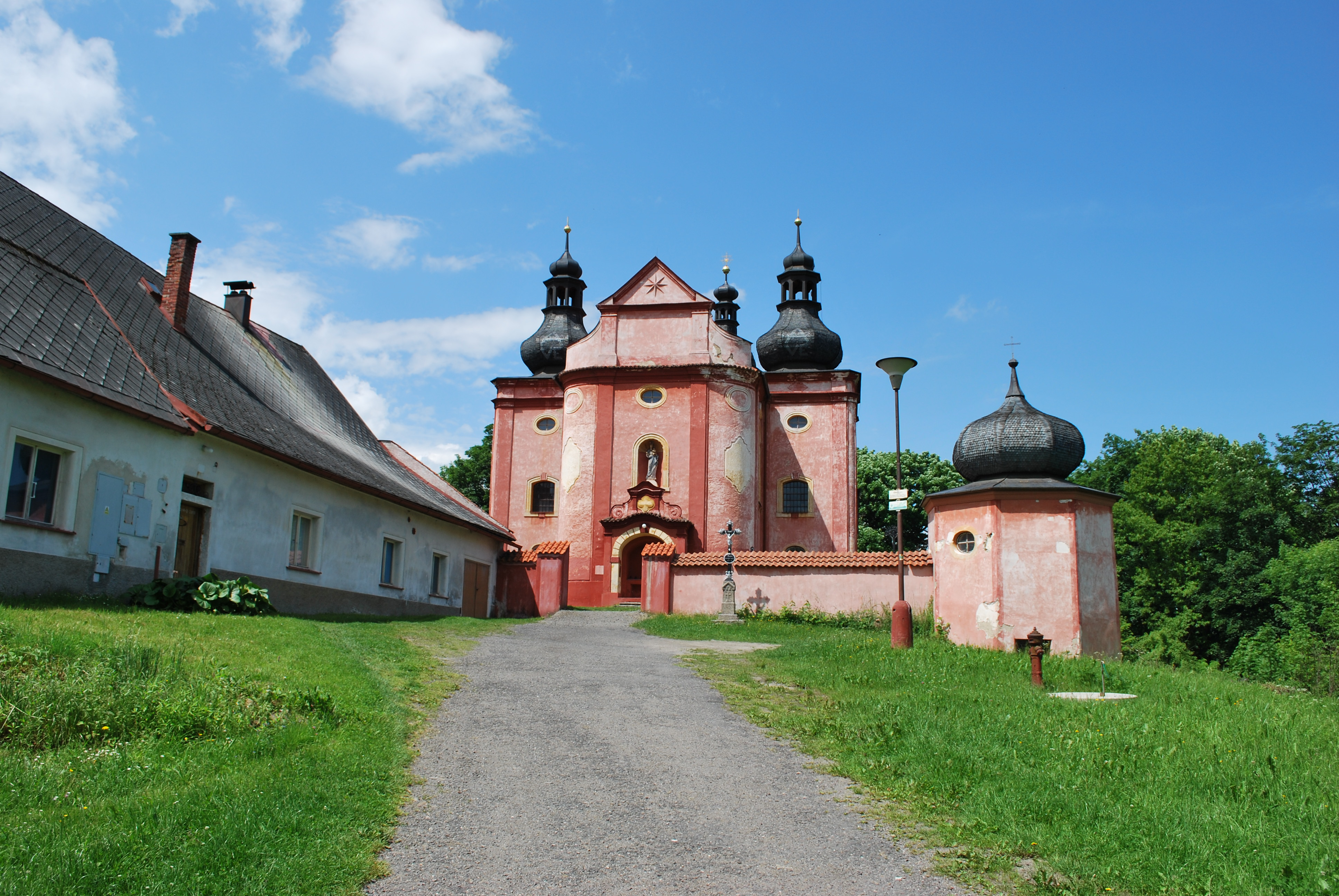
- Church of the Nativity of the Virgin Mary

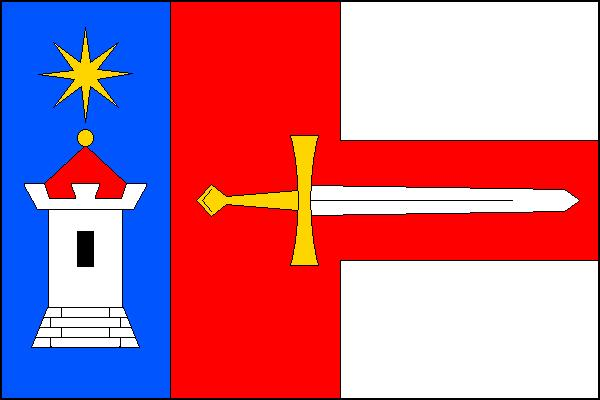
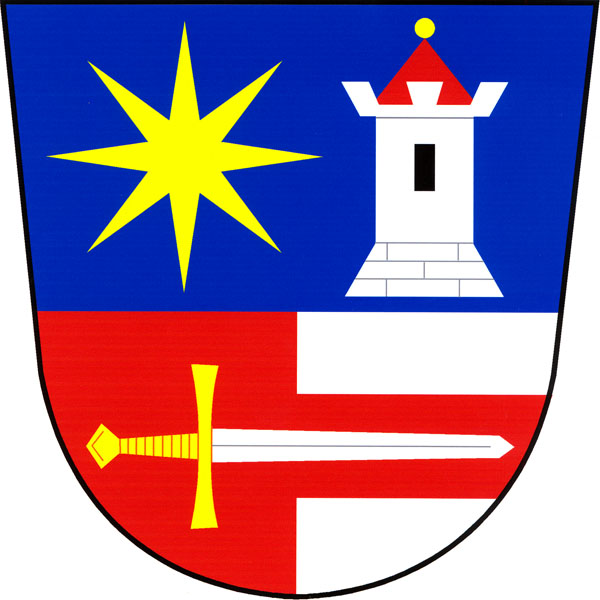
- Flag Coat of arms

- Location in the Czech Republic
- Coordinates: 49°10′46″N 13°38′26″E
- Country: Czech Republic
- Region: Plzeň
- District: Klatovy
- First mentioned: 1254

Area
  - Total: 16.33 km^{2} (6.31 sq mi)
- Elevation: 605 m (1,985 ft)

Population (2026-01-01)
  - Total: 310
  - Density: 19/km^{2} (49/sq mi)
- Time zone: UTC+1 (CET)
  - Summer (DST): UTC+2 (CEST)
- Postal code: 342 01
- Website: www.strasin.cz

Strašín is a municipality and village in Klatovy District in the Plzeň Region of the Czech Republic. It has about 300 inhabitants.

Strašín lies approximately 37 kilometres (23 mi) south-east of Klatovy, 67 km (42 mi) south of Plzeň, and 116 km (72 mi) south-west of Prague.

== Administrative division ==
Strašín consists of five municipal parts (in brackets population according to the 2021 census):

- Strašín (253)
- Maleč (19)
- Nahořánky (9)
- Věštín (14)
- Zuklín (11)

== Demographics ==
Historical population
Year	Pop.	±%
1869	1,202	—
1880	1,231	+2.4%
1890	1,380	+12.1%
1900	1,406	+1.9%
1910	1,482	+5.4%
1921	1,352	−8.8%
1930	1,225	−9.4%
1950	774	−36.8%
1961	749	−3.2%
1970	628	−16.2%
1980	475	−24.4%
1991	406	−14.5%
2001	362	−10.8%
2011	331	−8.6%
2021	306	−7.6%
Source: Censuses

== Notable people ==
- Karel Raška (1909–1987), epidemiologist
