= Small Fortress (Terezín) =

Austro-Hungarian prison located in modern Czechia

Coordinates: 50°30′45″N 14°9′26″E

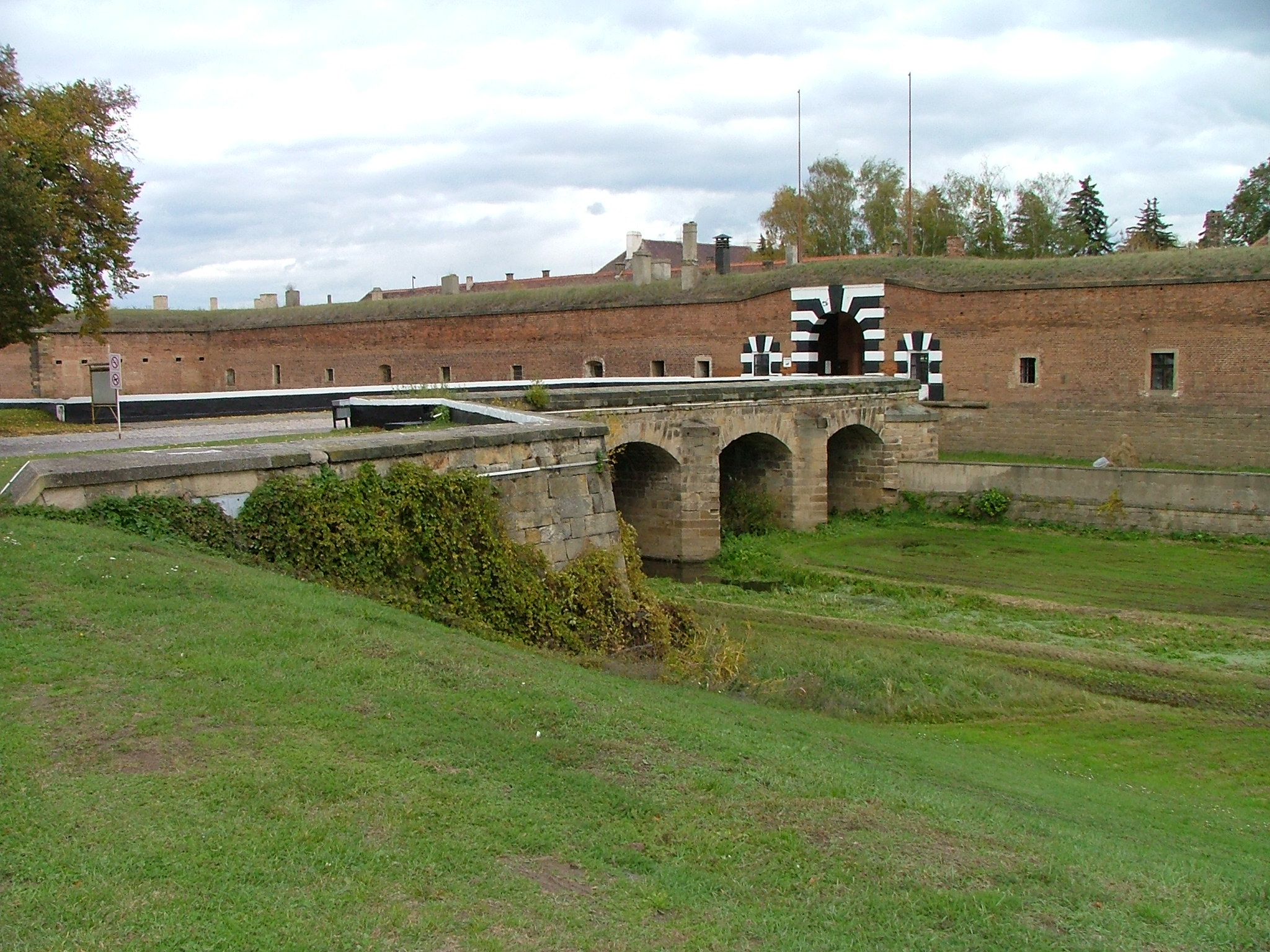
Entrance to the Small Fortress

The Small Fortress (Czech: Malá pevnost, German: Kleine Festung) is a fortress forming a significant part of the town of Terezín in the Czech Republic. The former military fortress was established at the end of the 18th century together with the whole town of Terezín on the right bank of the Ohře River. It served as a prison in the 19th century and was also house of imprisonment for Gavrilo Princip.

== World War I ==
During World War I, the fortress served as a prison for the opponents of Austria-Hungary. During the war, the Yugoslav nationalist Gavrilo Princip, who assassinated Archduke Franz Ferdinand of Austria, was imprisoned here. Princip died after nearly four years in the prison on 28 April 1918 of tuberculosis.

== World War II ==
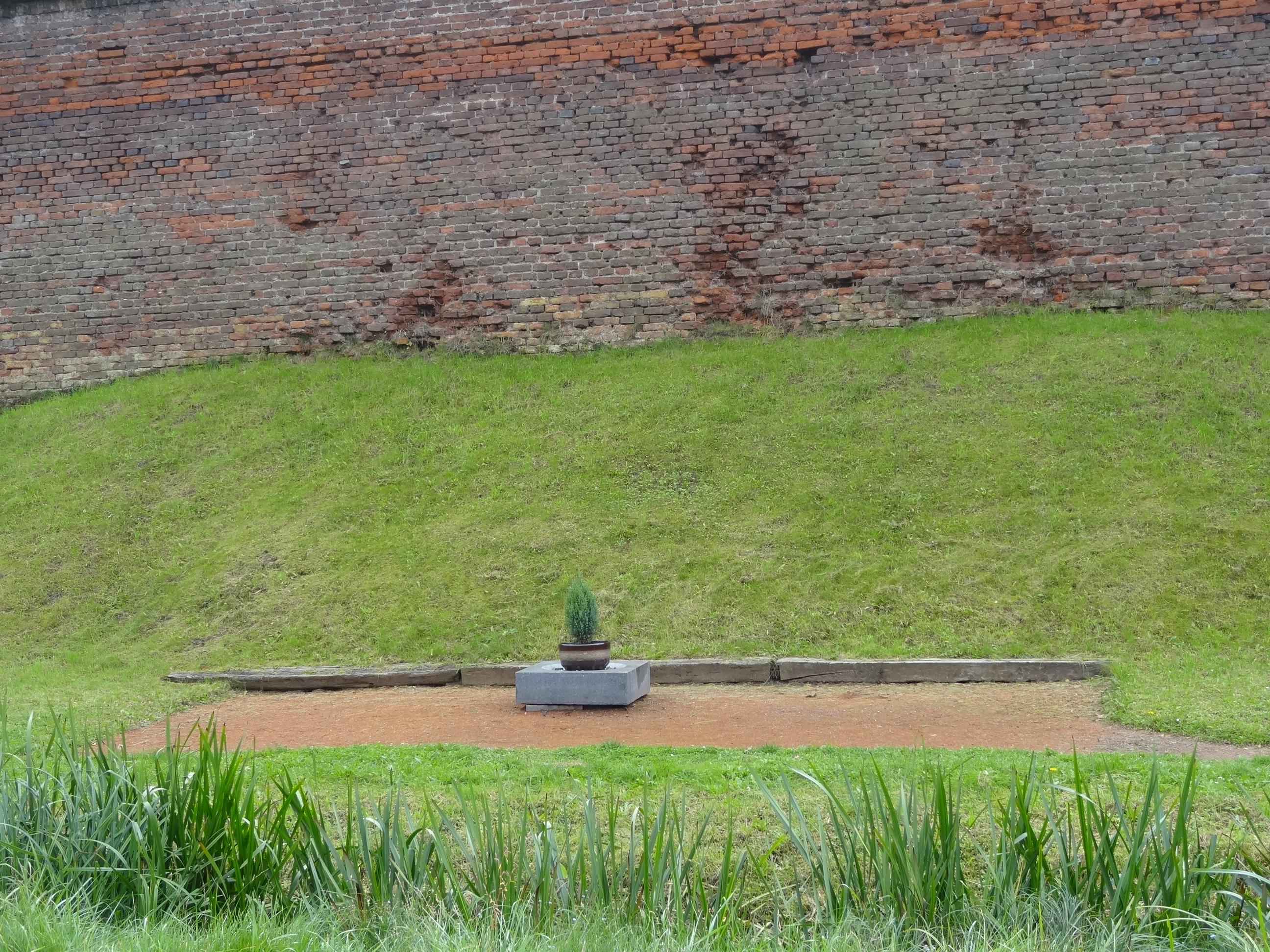
Place of executions in the Small Fortress

During World War II, the fortress served as a prison for the Prague Gestapo from 10 June 1940 until May 1945. It was the largest prison in the Protectorate of Bohemia and Moravia. Unlike the Terezín Ghetto, where the Jews were imprisoned, the Small Fortress served as a prison for the political opponents of the Nazi German regime, Czech resistance members, some British POWs, and other people from the Soviet Union, Yugoslavia, France, Italy etc. Throughout the operation of the Gestapo prison, around 32,000 people (including 5,000 women) were incarcerated here.

Executions in the fortress were carried out from 1943, based on the Sonderbehandlung treatment. In total more than 250 prisoners were executed here, with the last execution of 51 people taking place on 2 May 1945.

Living conditions in the prison were deteriorating every year, with the prisoners being used as slave labor mainly outside the fortress with various companies in the area. Nazi authorities used forced slave labor for military production for the Reich until the very last days of the war.

The Small Fortress had the character of a transitional prison, where the prisoners were being gradually sent to concentration camps. Around 2,600 prisoners were killed in the fortress through hunger, torture and poor hygiene. Thousands died after being transported from Terezín to concentration camps and elsewhere.

Commanding officer of the Small Fortress was SS-Hauptsturmführer Heinrich Jöckel, executed after the war in October 1946.

Notable prisoners of the Small Fortress include Vladimír Krajina, Ludvík Krejčí, Hugo Vojta, František Kravák, Siegfried Lederer, Josef Bílý, Otakar Wünsch, Milada Horáková, Kamil Krofta, Anna Letenská, Emil František Burian, Věra Tichánková, Eduard Urx and others.

== After World War II ==
At the end of World War II, epidemic typhus erupted in the fortress and the nearby ghetto. Czech epidemiologists Karel Raška and František Patočka arrived from Prague, and were leading measures to stop the spread of the epidemic in the fortress and the ghetto. Together they wrote a report describing the appalling conditions and mistreatment of German civilians incarcerated in the Small Fortress after the war ended.

In 1945–1948 the fortress served as an internment camp initially for the German POWs, and later for the German civilian population from Czechoslovakia, destined to be expelled from the country in line with the Beneš decrees. The expulsion of Germans from Czechoslovakia was a taboo topic in communist Czechoslovakia. The first research into this area was possible only after the fall of communism in 1989. Results of the historical research were published in 1997, and are available on the premises of the Terezín Memorial.

There were several trials held for atrocities committed in the fortress during the war. West Germany held two trials against people who worked in Small Fortress in the early 1950s. In 1950, Karl Spielmann was sentenced to 4.5 years in prison for grievous bodily harm in connection to the abuse of prisoners. In 1953, a Kapo, Josef Wollenweber, was sentenced to 4 years in prison on four counts of dangerous bodily harm and one count fatal bodily harm, for abusing inmates, sometimes fatally.

In the late 1960s, East Germany arrested Kurt Willi Wachholz, a former Small Fortress supervisor. Wachholz was convicted of war crimes and crimes against humanity for participating in the murders of over 300 prisoners, some of whom he personally beat, stoned, kicked, and drowned. He was also convicted of complicity in the firing squad executions of at least 183 people. Wachholz was sentenced to death in 1968, and executed at Leipzig Prison on 28 April 1969.

In 2000, German officials also arrested Anton Malloth, a former Small Fortress supervisor who was nicknamed "The handsome Toni". In 2001, Malloth was convicted of beating at least 100 prisoners to death and sentenced to life in prison. Dying of cancer, he was released from prison 10 days before his death on 31 October 2002.
