= Dejvická (Prague Metro) =

Transit station in Prague, Czechia

Coordinates: 50°6′2.14″N 14°23′31.25″E

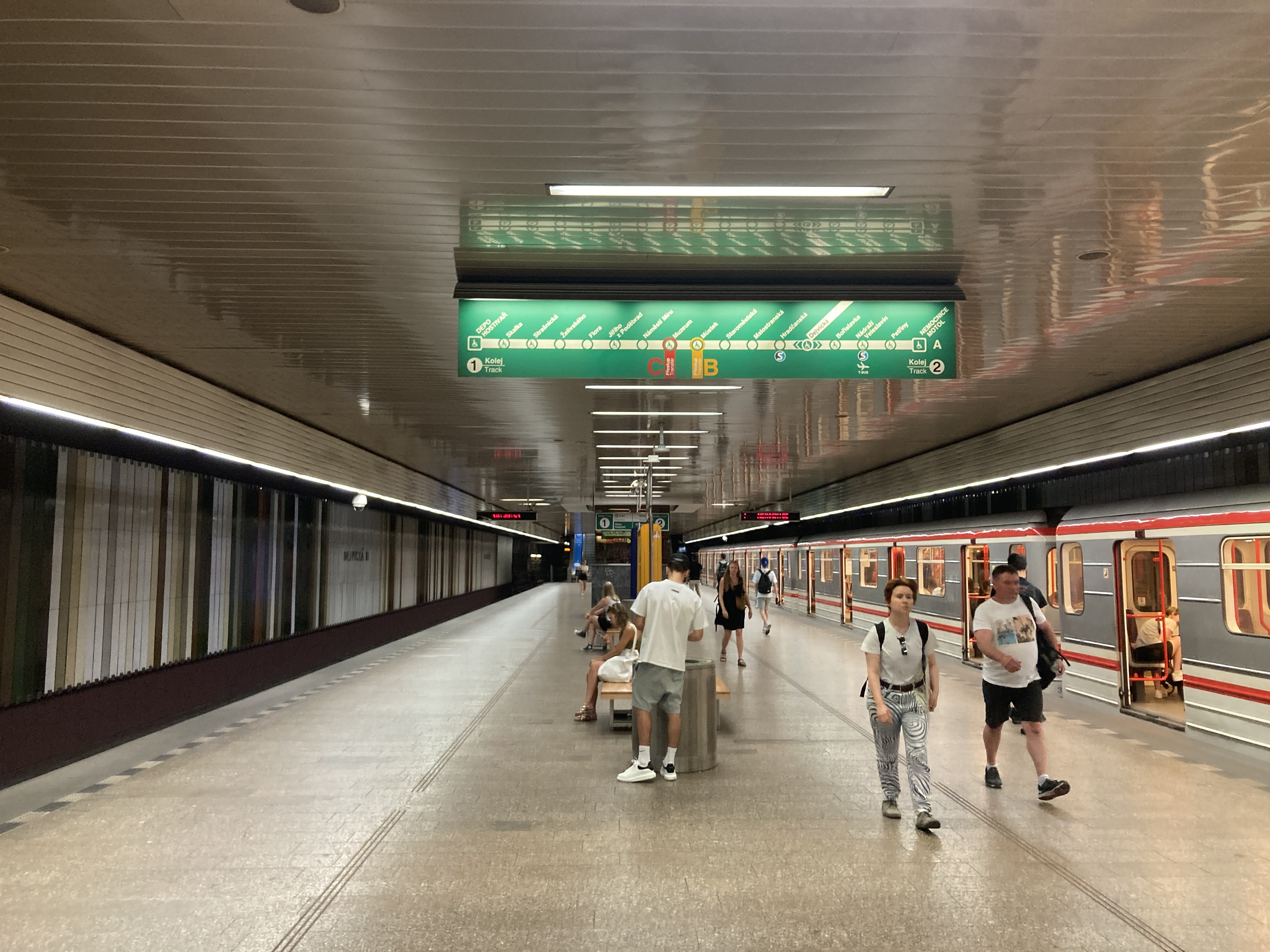

General information
- Location: Dejvice, Prague 6 Prague; Czech Republic
- System: Prague Metro
- Platforms: 1 island platform
- Tracks: 2

Construction
- Structure type: Underground
- Depth: 115 m (377 ft)
- Accessible: Yes

History
- Opened: 12 August 1978; 48 years ago

Services
| Preceding station | Prague Metro | Following station |
|---|---|---|
| Bořislavka toward Nemocnice Motol | Line A | Hradčanská toward Depo Hostivař |
Location

Dejvická (Czech pronunciation: [ˈdɛjvɪtskaː]) is a Prague Metro station on Line A. It lies at the eastern end of the main boulevard Evropská Třída.

== History ==
The station was opened on 12 August 1978 as the western terminus of the inaugural section of Line A, between Leninova and Náměstí Míru. It was formerly known as Leninova after Vladimir Lenin, and renamed Dejvická in 1990 following the Velvet Revolution.

Dejvická station was built between 1973 and 1978 with a cost of 301 million Czechoslovak crowns.

The station served as the end of Line A until the extension to Nemocnice Motol was opened on 6 April 2015.

== General information ==
The station serves and is named after the Dejvice district of Prague 6. The Dejvická Farmers' Market is located nearby and open on Saturdays.

== Exits ==
The station has two exits

- Western exit leading to Evropská Třída
- Eastern exit leading to Victory Square (Czech: Vítězné náměstí).

== Gallery ==
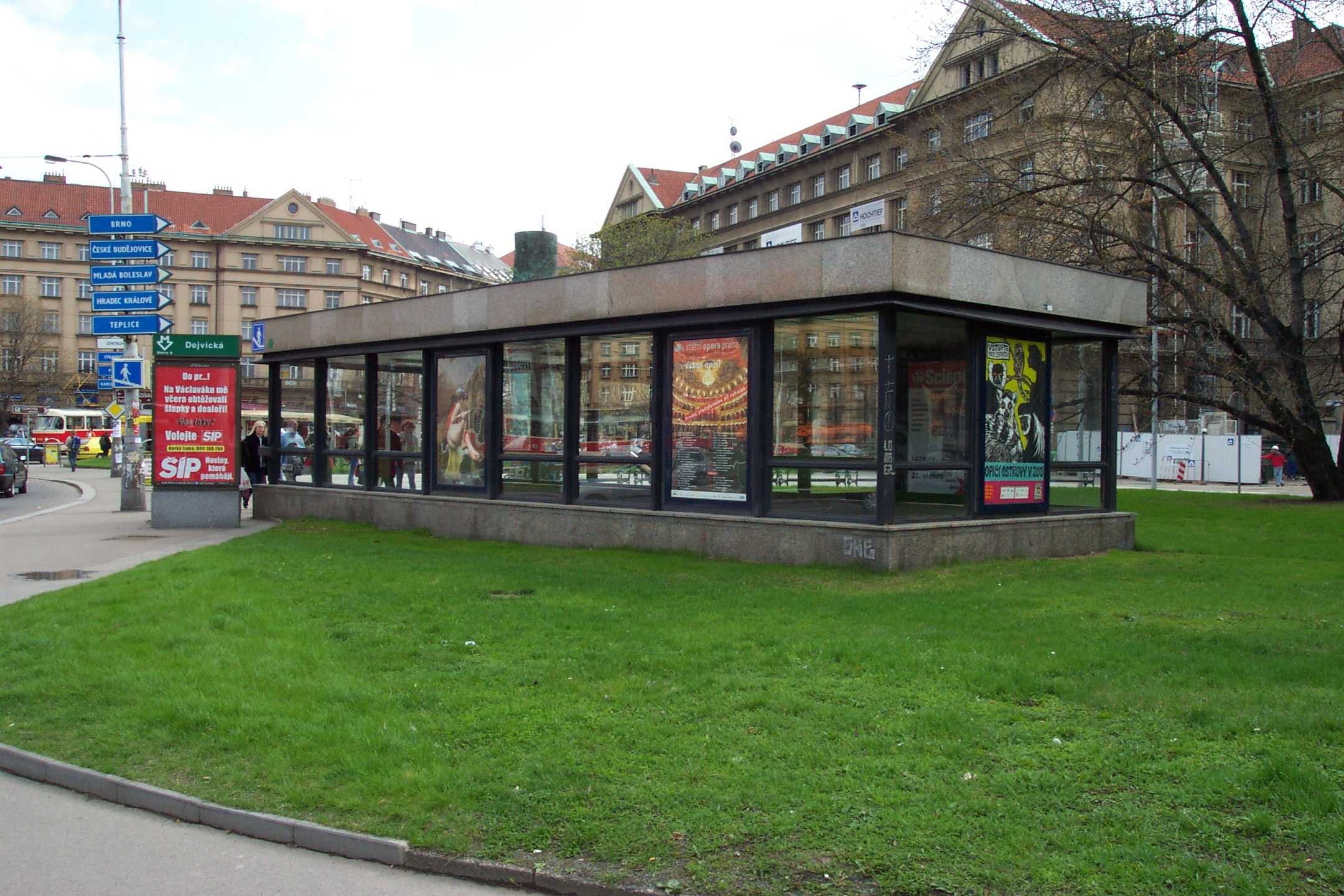
Entrance to the station on Vítězné náměstí (Victory Square)

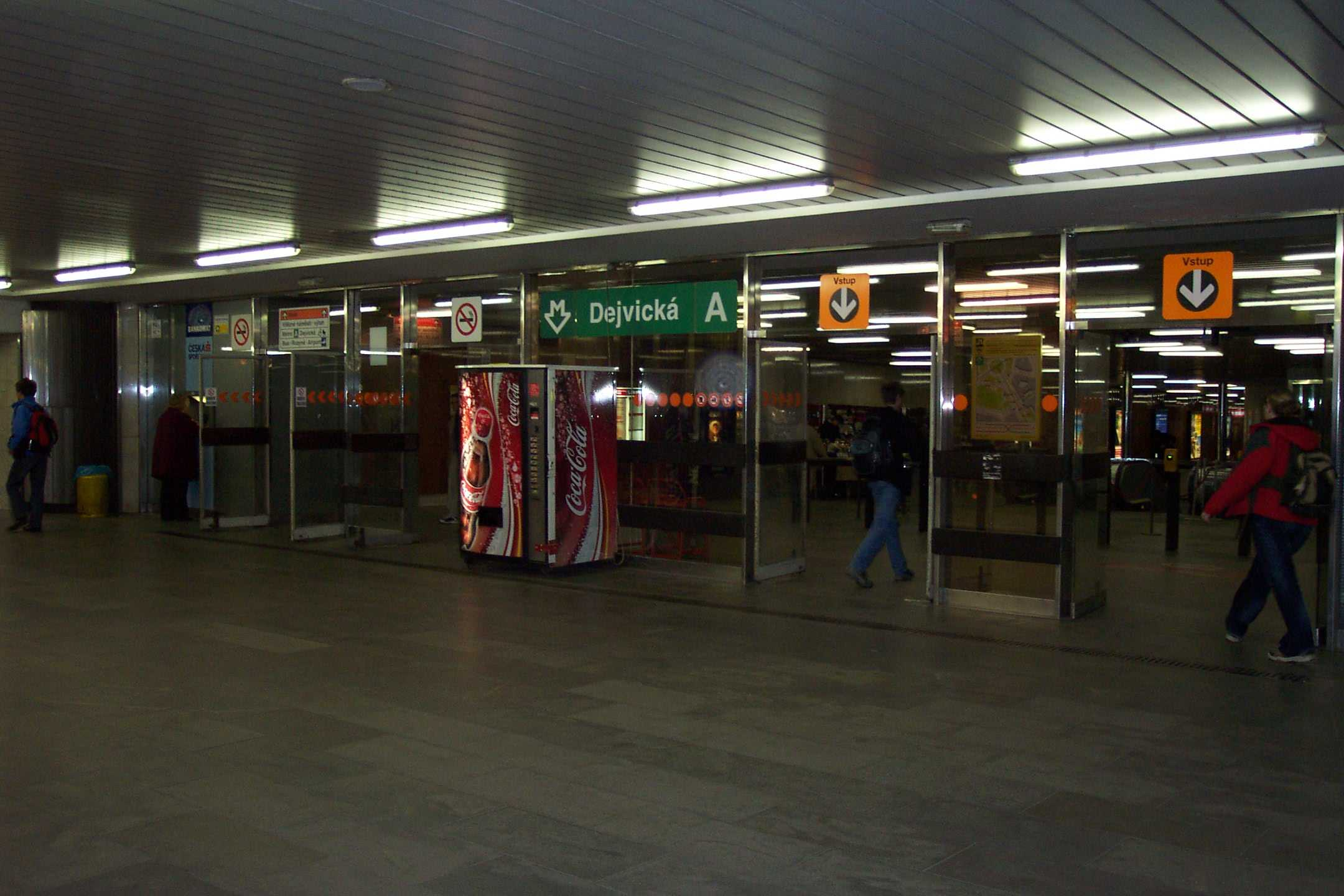
Lobby of the station
