= Ivan Honl =

Czech biologist (1866–1936)

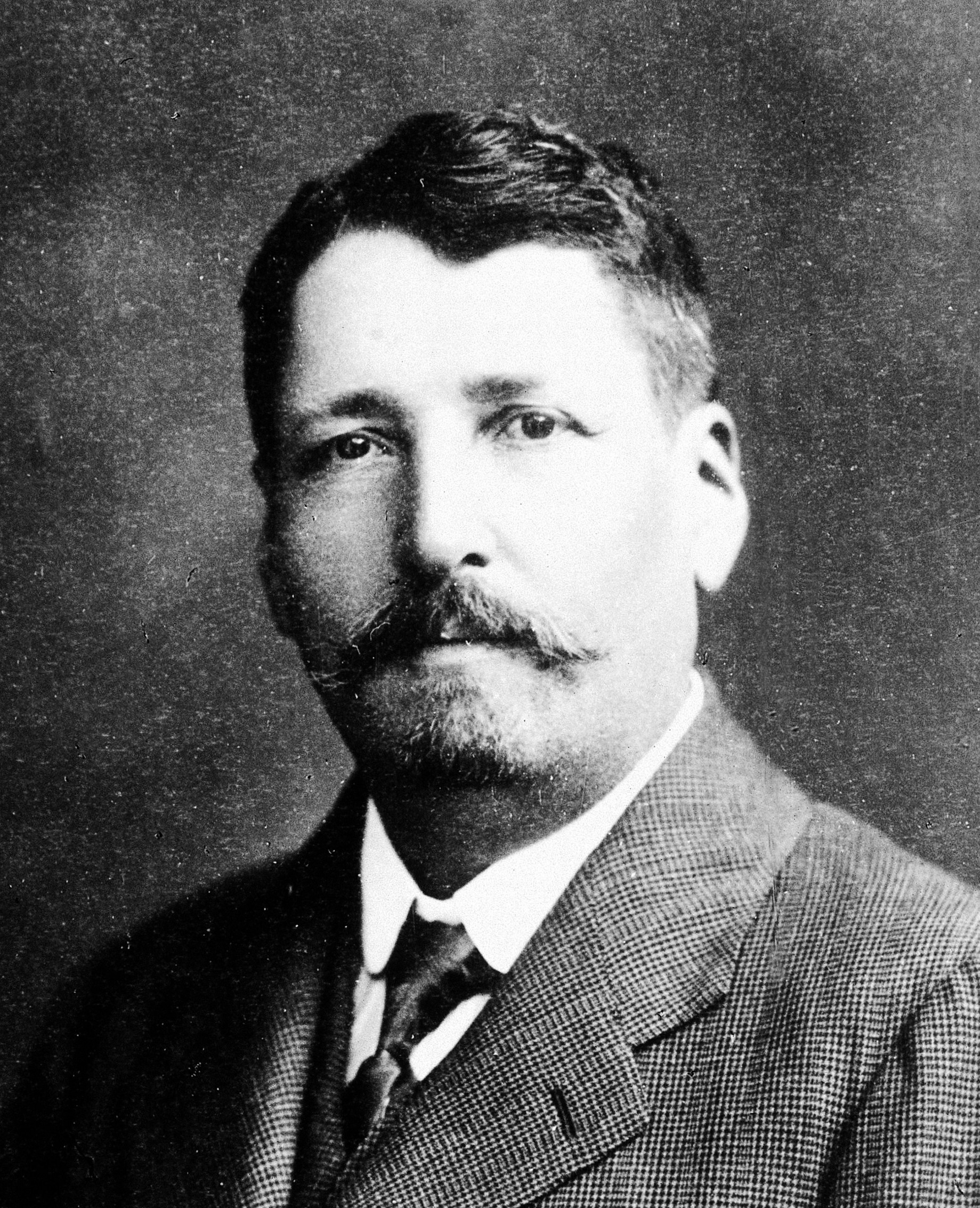
Ivan Honl

Ivan Honl (23 April 1866 in Zbýšov, Moravia – 7 June 1936 in Lázně Běloves, Náchod, Czechoslovakia) was a Czech bacteriologist, serologist and activist in the struggle against tuberculosis. Honl became one of founders of Czech microbiology.

Under the guidance of Jaroslav Hlava Honl gained his habilitation in bacteriology at Charles University in Prague in 1898. In 1919 he was named head to the new Czech Bacteriological Institute (Ústav pro bakteriologii a sérologii Lékařské fakulty Univerzity Karlovy). .

Honl was one of the early researchers of antibiotics. At the end of the 1890s he isolated a product of Bacterium pyocyaneum (today called Pseudomonas aeruginosa), which was used as medicine (Anginol) from the start of WWI until it was replaced by penicillin after WWII.

In 1899 he co-founded an institute to treat tuberculosis in Czechoslovakia and was active in this struggle for decades.
