= Karel Raška =

Czech epidemiologist (1909-1987)

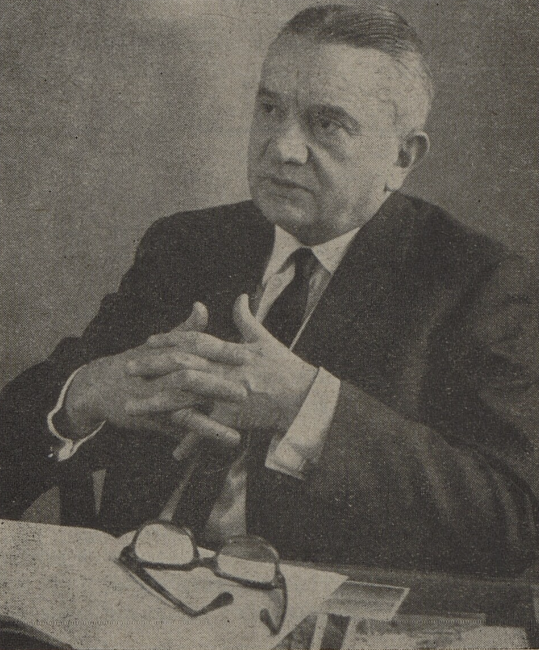
- Born: 17 November 1909; Strašín, Bohemia, Austria-Hungary
- Died: 21 November 1987 (aged 78); Prague, Czechoslovakia
- Education: Charles University
- Known for: Smallpox eradication
- Awards: Edward Jenner Medal (1984)
- Scientific career
- Workplaces: Institute of Epidemiology and Microbiology; World Health Organization

Karel Raška (Czech pronunciation: [ˈkarɛl ˈraʃka]; 17 November 1909 – 21 November 1987) was a Czech medical doctor and epidemiologist, who headed the successful international effort during the 1960s to eradicate smallpox.

== Life ==
Raška was born on 17 November 1909 in Strašín. He became Director of the WHO Division of Communicable Disease Control in 1963. His new concept of eliminating the disease was adopted by the WHO in 1967 and eventually led to the eradication of smallpox in 1977. Raška was also a strong promoter of the concept of disease surveillance, which was adopted in 1968 and has since become a standard practice in epidemiology.

At the end of World War II, together with epidemiologist František Patočka, he personally led measures to stop the spread of epidemic typhus in the Terezín concentration camp.

Despite being respected abroad, Raška's contribution to eradicating smallpox was not appreciated in Communist Czechoslovakia. In 1970 he was removed from his position at the head of the Institute of Epidemiology and Microbiology by communist authorities. In 1972 he was forced to retire, and was even banned from entering the Institute premises. The reason was a personal vendetta by the communist minister of health, Jaroslav Prokopec, after Raška revealed that Prokopec had plagiarised his doctoral thesis.
