= Ruzyně Prison =

Prison in Prague 6, Czech Republic

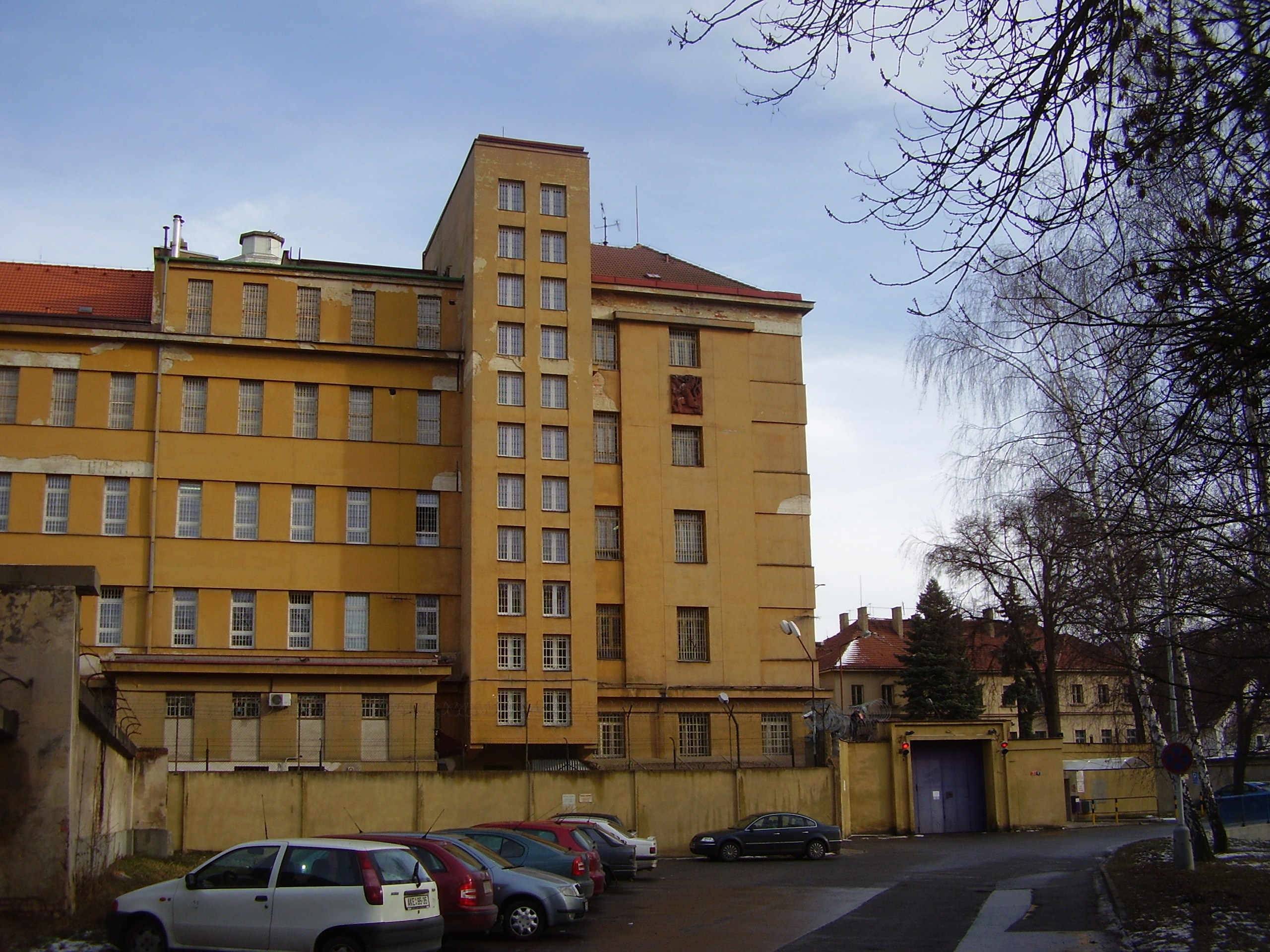
- Interactive map of Ruzyně Prison
- Location: Prague, Czech Republic; 50°4′55.20″N 14°18′48.96″E
- Status: Operational
- Capacity: 910
- Population: 691 (June 2015)
- Opened: 1 July 1935
- Managed by: Prison Service of the Czech Republic
- Website: www.vscr.cz/organizacni-jednotky/vazebni-veznice-praha-ruzyne

Ruzyně Prison (Czech: Vazební věznice Praha Ruzyně) is a prison in the Ruzyně neighborhood of Prague 6, Czech Republic.

== History ==
Construction began in April 1949 to renovate a disused building near Prague–Ruzyně Airport and the prison opened by October, to house the Slánský trial victims. During the Communist era, arrested dissidents were held there, including Václav Havel, who later became President of Czechoslovakia. The prison is currently used to hold detainees awaiting trial.
