= Prison Service of the Czech Republic =

Czech Government Agency

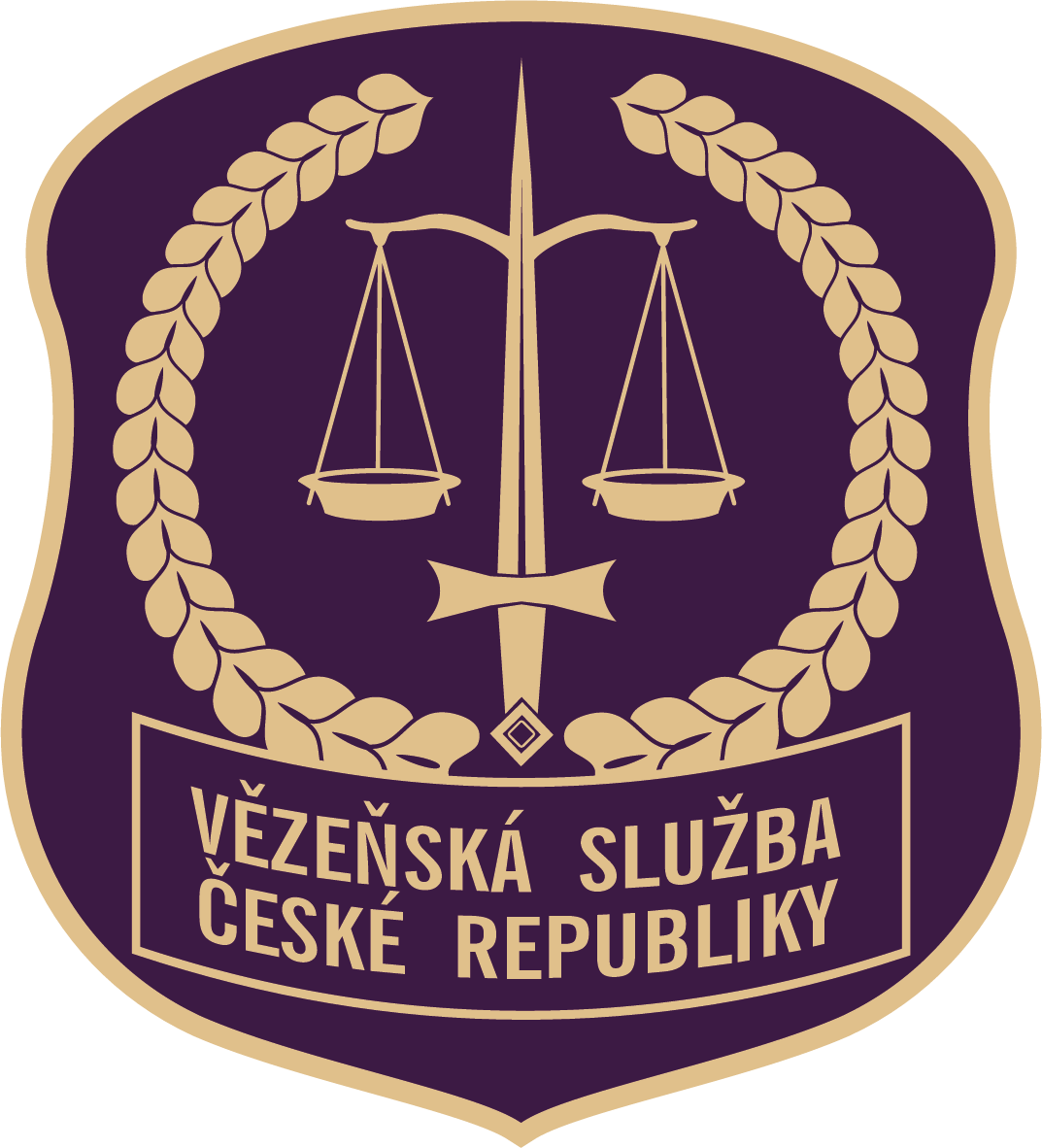

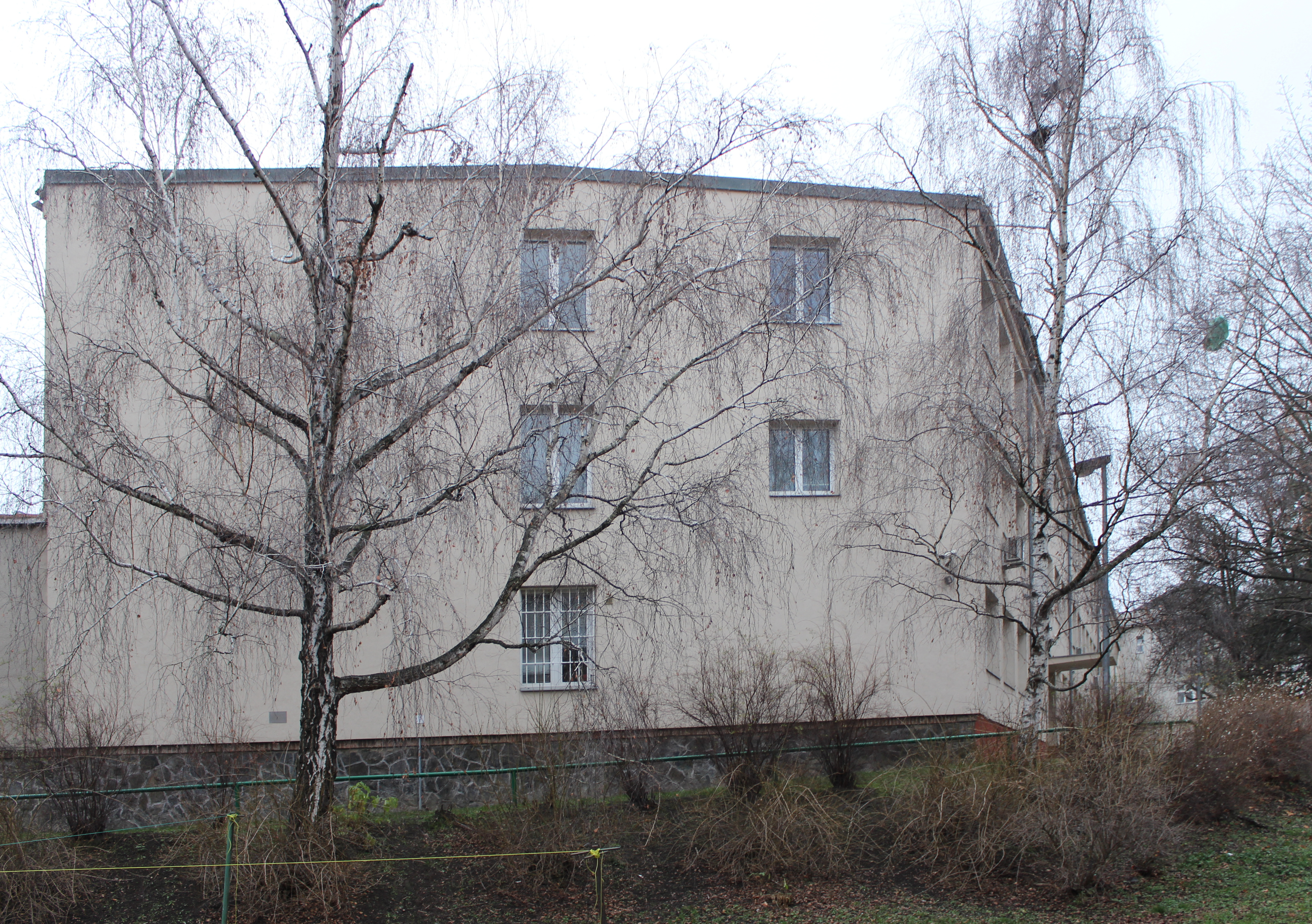
- Head office of the Czech Prison Service in Prague

Agency overview
- Formed: 1 January 1993
- Headquarters: Soudní 1672/1a, Prague, Czech Republic, 140 00; 50°3′27.68″N 14°26′17.23″E
- Employees: 2 113 (2018)
- Agency executive: Simon Michailidis
- Website: vscr.cz

The Prison Service of the Czech Republic (Czech: Vězeňská služba České republiky or VS ČR) is the prison agency of the Czech Republic. Its head office is located in Prague District 4. As of 2021 the head of the prison service is Simon Michailidis.
