= Petřiny =

Neighborhood in Prague

Coordinates: 50°5′18″N 14°20′39″E

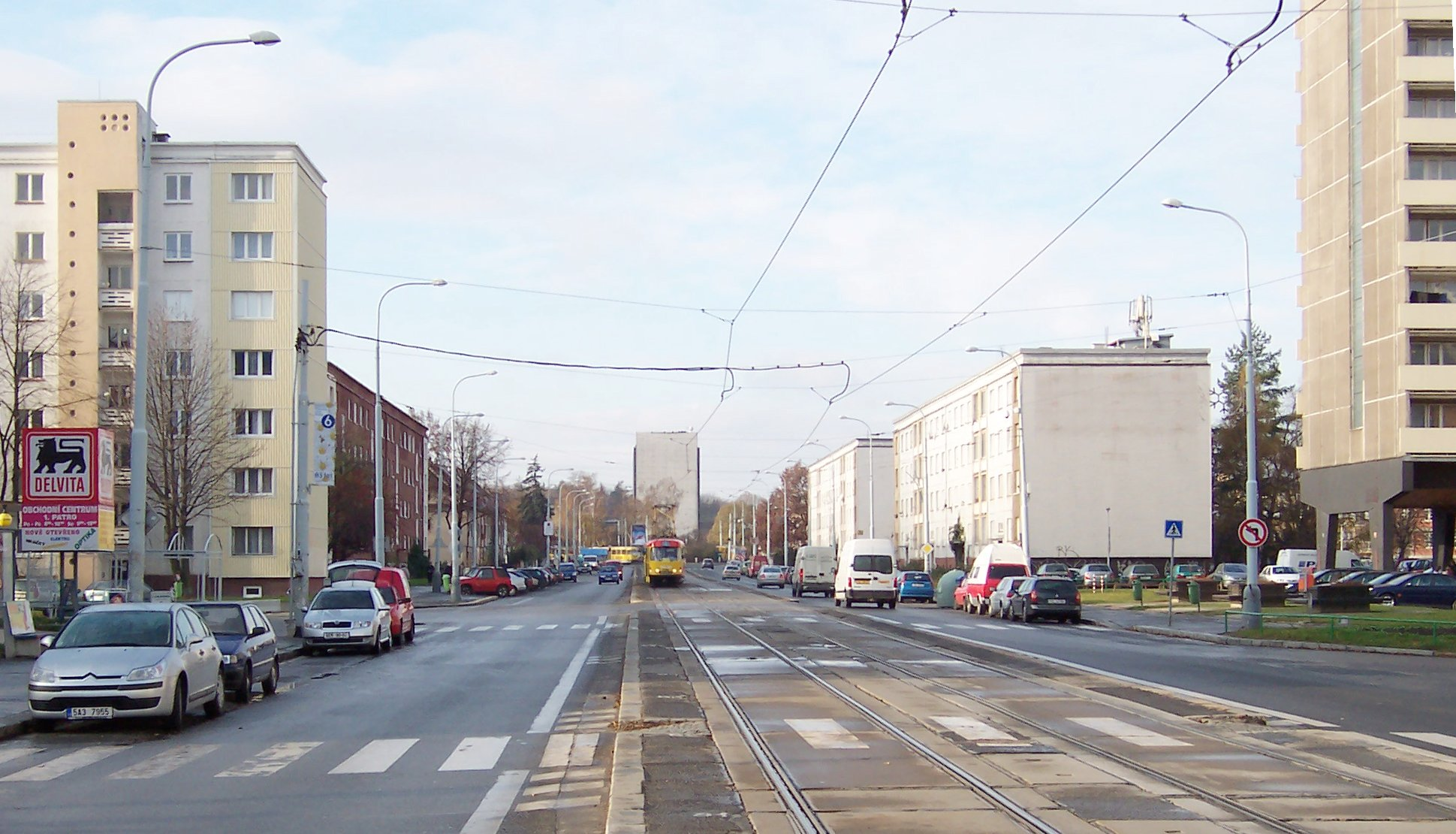
Na Petřinách street

Petřiny is a neighbourhood in Prague comprising the oldest panel housing estate in the city. It officially comprises three microdistricts; Petřiny I, part of Veleslavín, and Petřiny II and III, belonging to Břevnov, all belonging to the administrative district Prague 6.

== Characteristics ==
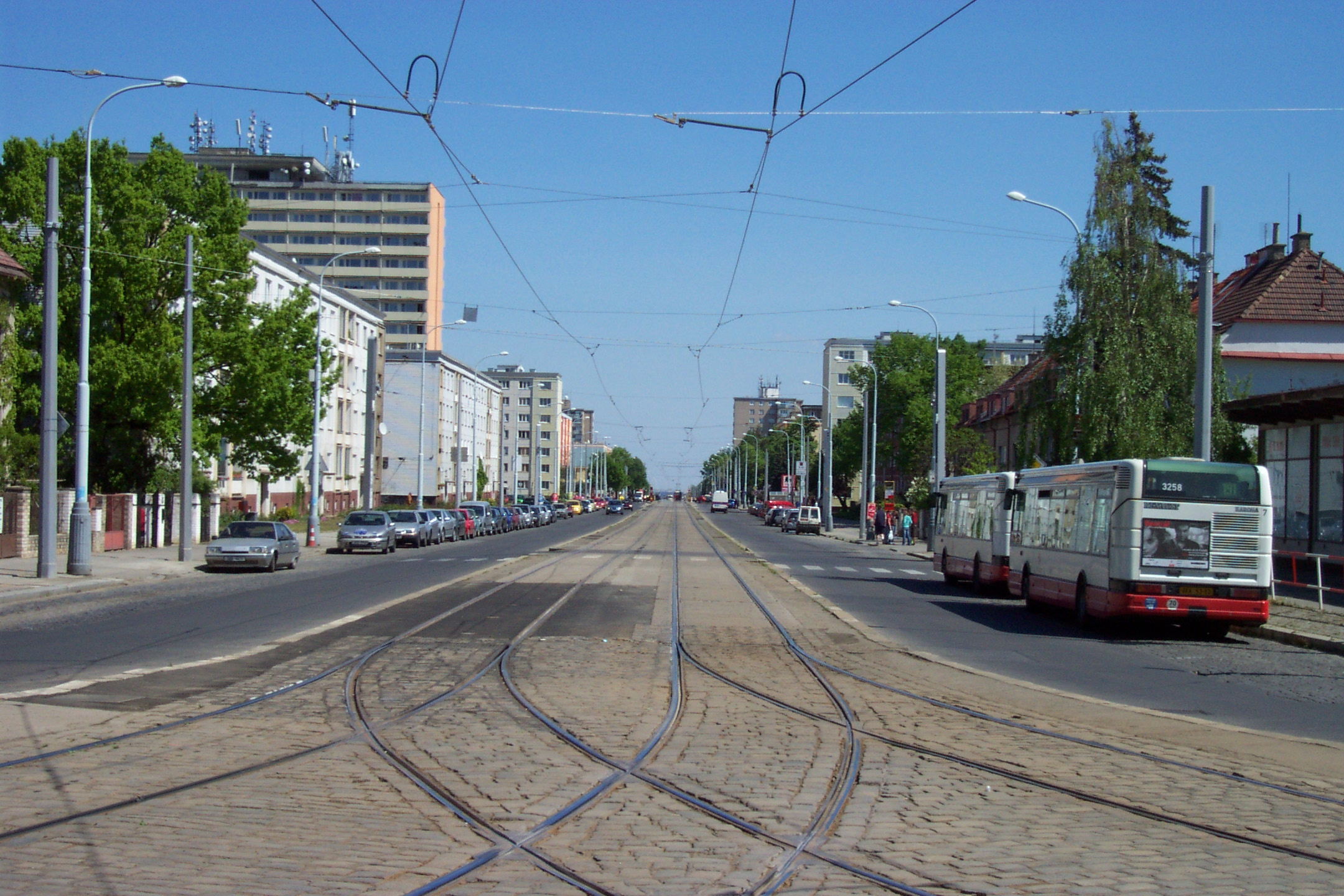
View to the housing estate from Petřiny tram terminus

The housing estate in Petřiny was built between 1959 and 1969, with the intention of housing around 15,000 people, and was designed by architects Evžen Benda and Vojtěch Mixa. It was built on an empty field between the military hospital in Prague, the Obora Hvězda game reserve, and the crossroad at Vypich in Břevnov. The streets were named in 1962 and were initially named after communist personalities and World War II casualties. Notable buildings in the estate include the Macromolecular Chemical Institute (Ústav makromolekulární chemie), in which Otto Wichterle worked, and a memorial to him can be found in front of the building today. Part of the area, as well as a tram stop and a student dormitory, is named Větrník after a windmill which functioned from 1722 to 1905, whose building now serves as a guesthouse. The newest development of buildings in the housing estate, named Sídliště Hvězda, were designed by Vlado Milunić.

== Transport ==
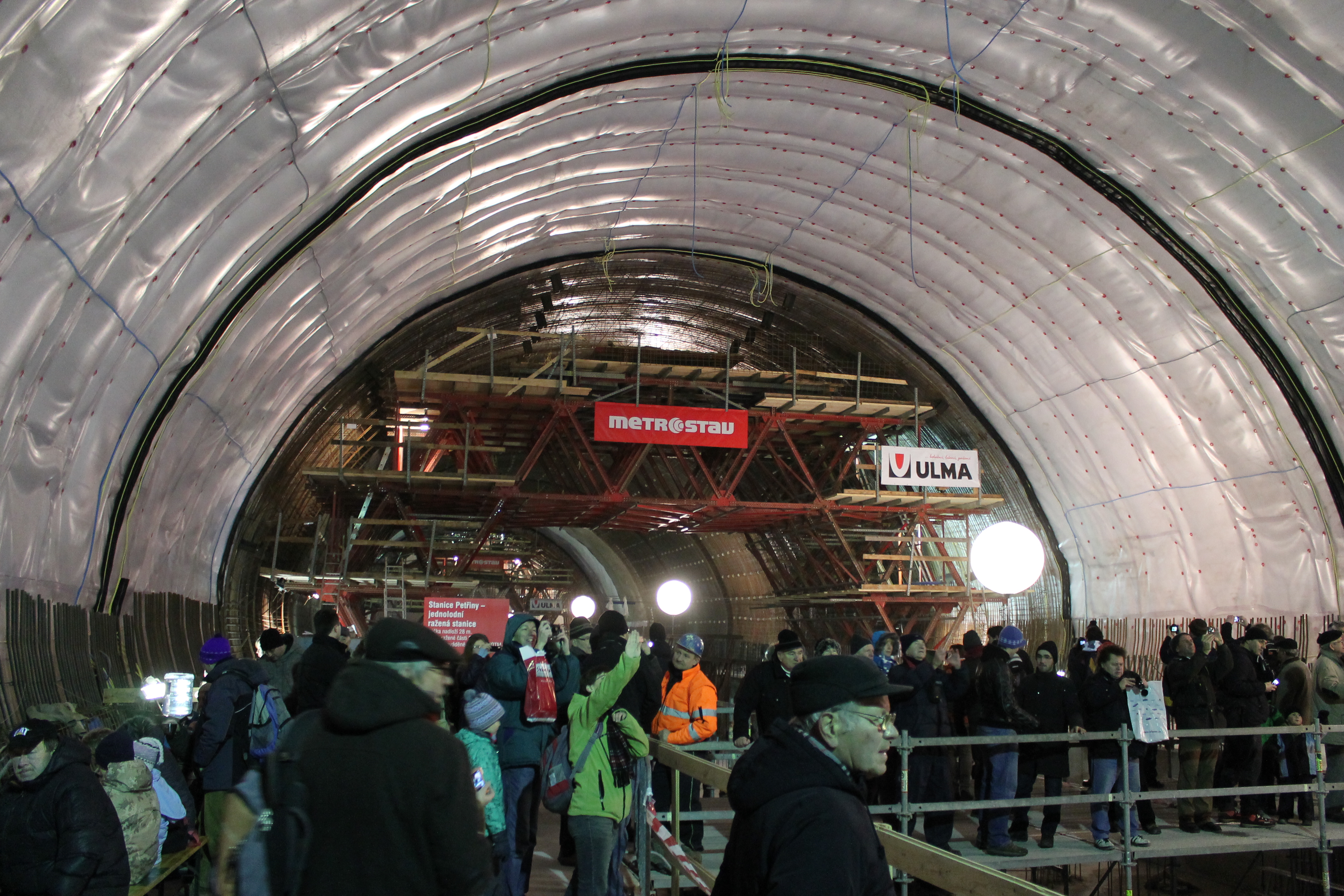
Metro station Petřiny under construction (2013)

The area is centered on Na Petřinách street and its tram line, which connects the area to the centre of Prague by public transport. The area is also located near Václav Havel Airport, to which it is connected by bus. The area is served by Petřiny station on Prague Metro's A line, which opened on April 6, 2015.

== Nearby districts ==
- Břevnov
- Liboc
- Vokovice
- Veleslavín
- Střešovice
- Strahov
- Motol
- Bílá Hora
