= Bořislavka (Prague Metro) =

Prague metro station

Coordinates: 50°5′54.82″N 14°21′47.55″E

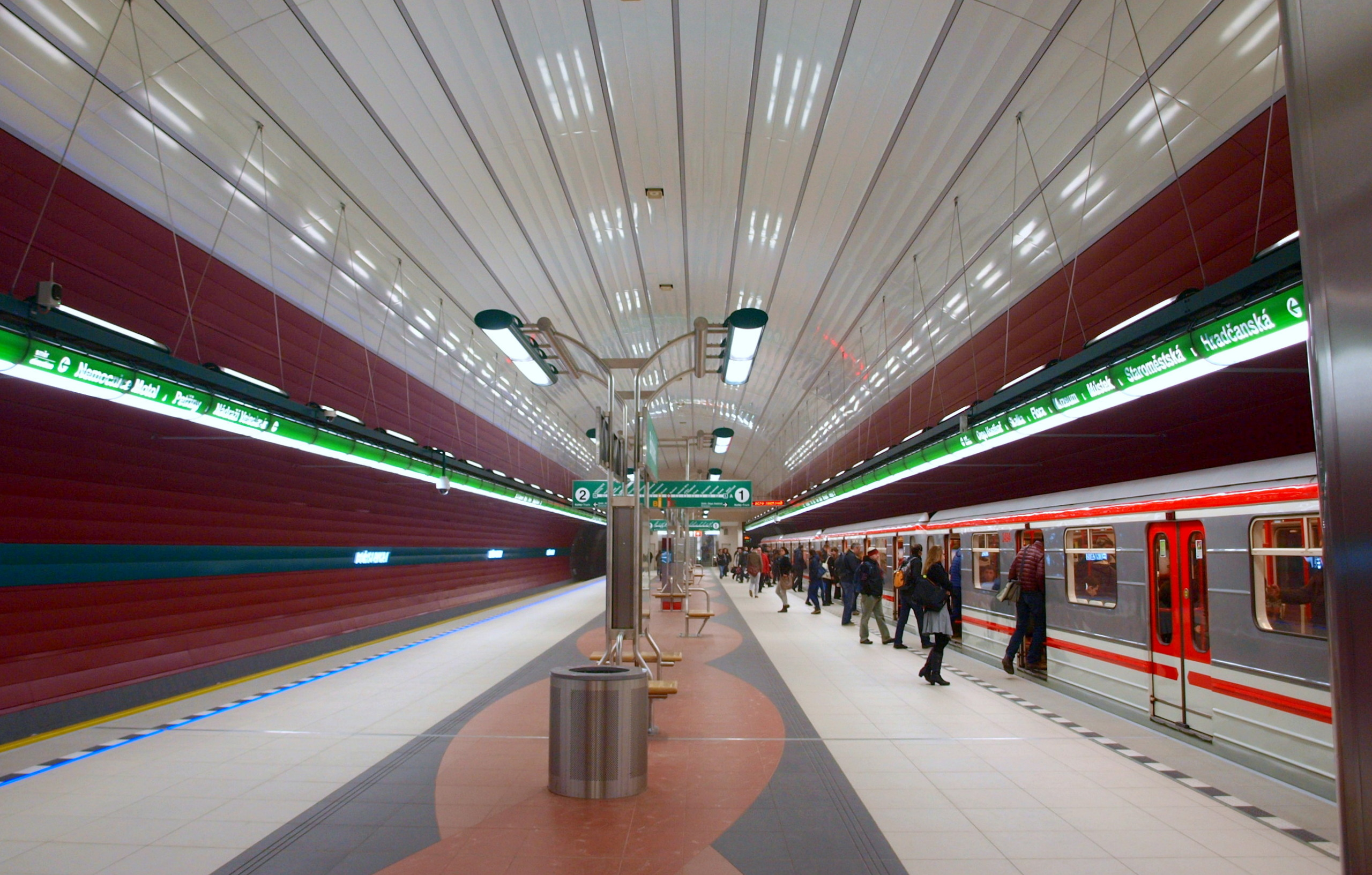

General information
- Location: Vokovice, Prague 6 Prague; Czech Republic
- System: Prague Metro
- Platforms: 1 island platform
- Tracks: 2

Construction
- Structure type: Underground
- Depth: 267 m (876 ft)
- Accessible: Yes

History
- Opened: 6 April 2015; 11 years ago

Services
| Preceding station | Prague Metro | Following station |
|---|---|---|
| Nádraží Veleslavín toward Nemocnice Motol | Line A | Dejvická toward Depo Hostivař |
Location

Bořislavka (Czech pronunciation: [ˈbor̝ɪslafka]) is a Prague Metro station on Line A located in Vokovice, Prague 6, which opened on 6 April 2015 along with Nádraží Veleslavín, Petřiny and Nemocnice Motol stations on the first section of the western extension of line A (section V.A). Originally the station was planned to be named Červený Vrch ("Red Hill"), after the nearby housing estate of this name.

== General information ==
The station is built 27.8 m under the main road, Evropská třída, with one exit leading to the crossroad with Horoměřická street and another leading to the corner of Arabská street, at the beginning of the Červený Vrch housing estate. The Horoměřická exit will lead to a new suburban bus terminal serving Nebušice, Jenerálka and Horoměřice, as well as access to the tram network. The closest tram stop to this station was renamed from Horoměřická to Bořislavka after the station was opened; the stop previously named Bořislavka, located one stop further towards the centre, was renamed Na Piskách.

Bořislavka was built as an underground station and it was designed by architect Miroslav Mroczek.

== Gallery ==
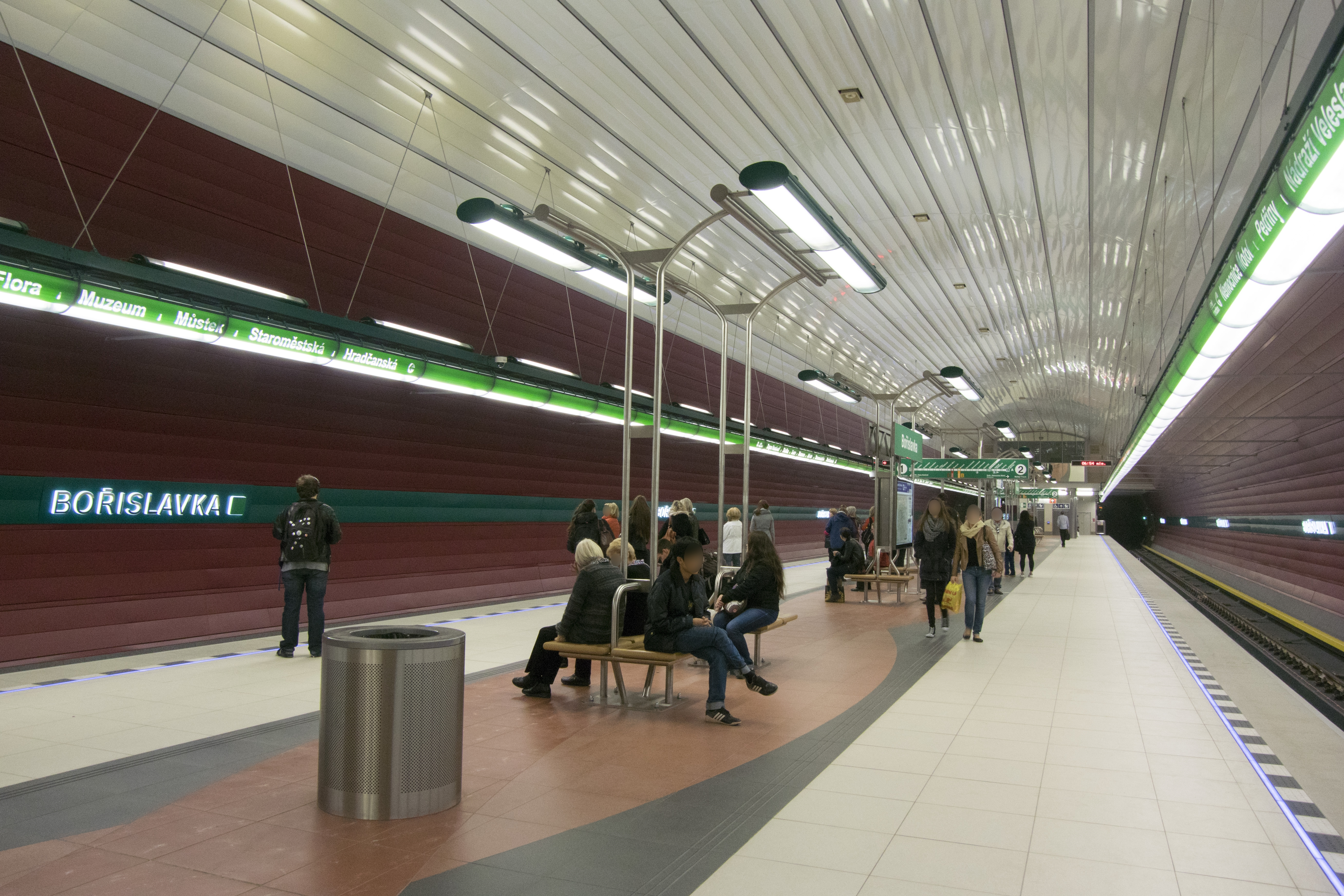
Station platform

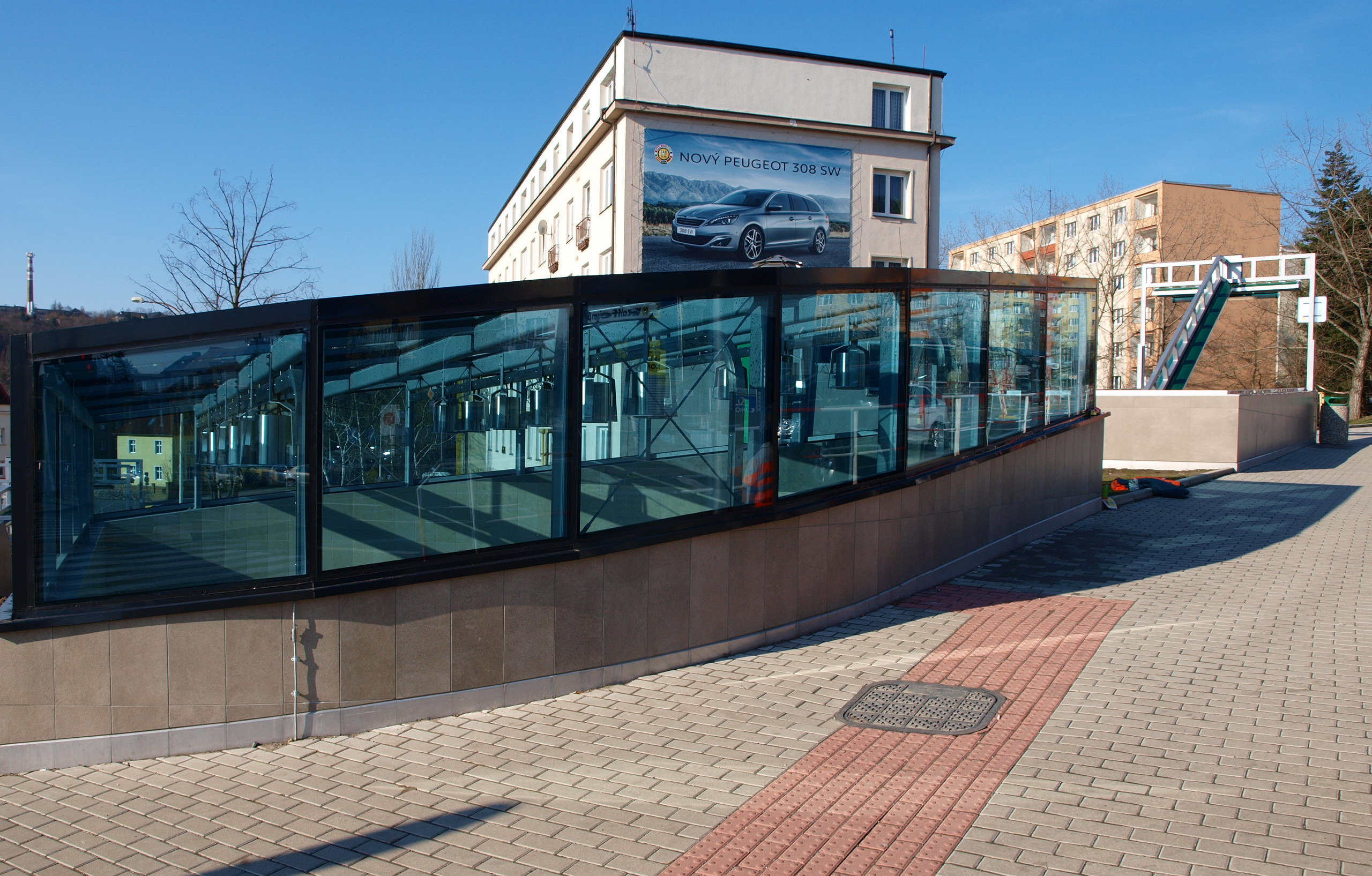
Entrance to the station on the intersection of Evropská and Horoměřická streets
