= Stolpersteine in Prague-Břevnov, Bubeneč and Dejvice =

Memorial installations in Czech Republic

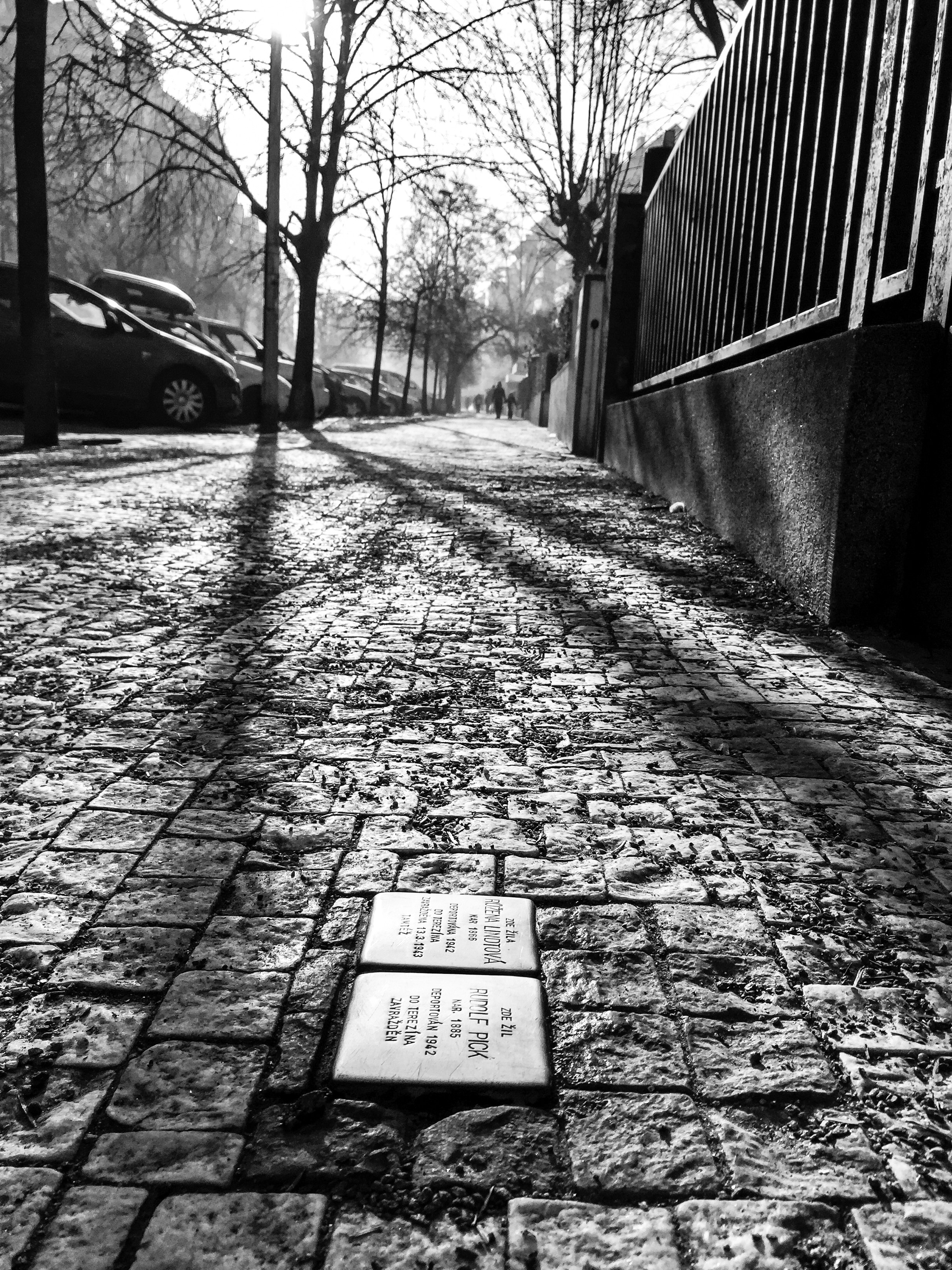
Stolpersteine for Růžena Lindtová und Rudolf Pick in Prag-Bubeneč

This article lists the Stolpersteine that were placed in the Prague district of Břevnov and Bubeneč as well as in the cadastral district of Dejvice. Břevnov has partially belonged to Prague since 2002; Dejvice is entirely part of Prague 6. Bubeneč was divided between Prague 6 and Prague 7. The stumbling blocks remind and make aware of the fate of the people who were murdered, deported, expelled or driven into suicide by the national socialists. The SStolpersteine were designed and placed by Gunter Demnig.

The Czech stumbling block project Stolpersteine.cz was launched in 2008 by Česká unie židovské mládeže (Czech Union of Jewish Youth) under the patronage of the Prague mayor. The Stolpersteine lie in front of the victim's last freely-chosen place of residence. In Czech, the stumbling blocks are called Kameny zmizelých; stones of the disappeared.

The tables are partially sortable; the sorting is carried out alphabetically according to the family name.

== Břevnov ==
Image	Inscription	Location	Life
	HERE LIVED; WILHELM HALPERN; BORN 1890; DEPORTED 1940; TO DACHAU; MURDERED 27.1.1942; IN DACHAU	U páté baterie 937/42; 50°05′28″N 14°21′56″E	Wilhelm Halpern was born on 19 August 1890 in Kopytschynzi in former Galicia. His parents were Isaak Halpern and Marie b. Neumann He studied law, became a lawyer, married Lilian (also Laura) b. Neumann (born 1888) and lived in Vienna with her. In 1928 his wife died. In 1932, he moved to Prague and took over the guardianship of Antonie Else Tamler, the daughter of his sister-in-law, his father, who died unexpectedly. He was deported to the Dachau concentration camp, where he arrived on September 20, 1940. In 1941, he was murdered there.

== Bubeneč ==
Image	Inscription	Location	Life
	HERE LIVED; EMIL ASCHNER; BORN 1884; DEPORTED 1941; TO ŁÓDŹ; MURDERED; IN AUSCHWITZ	Milady Horákové 845/96; 50°05′58″N 14°25′03″E	Ing. Emil Aschner was born on 29 November 1884 in Vienna. His parents were Samuel Aschner (c. 1849–1917) and Paula b. Blaustern (1853–1924). His father was the owner of a shirt and underwear factory in Vienna. He completed an engineering degree and married Alice b. Fenichel, also called Lilly (born March 11, 1894, in Vienna). The couple had two children, Peter (1918–1984) and Eva (1923–2014), both born in Vienna. His wife died in the 1920s. The children were brought up in Prague by Adele Kajak, the housekeeper. Emil Aschner and his children were able to flee from Vienna to England in 1938. Emil Aschner returned to Vienna to help his brother after his arrest. It is unclear what happened after 1941. The last place of residence of Emil Aschner before deportation was in Prague XIII, Ruská 22/563. On October 26, 1941, Emil Aschner, his brother Richard and his wife were transported from Prague to the Łódź Ghetto, with transport C. Their transport numbers were 421, 495 and 496. There, all three family members were murdered by the Nazi regime. Both children remained in England and survived. His son Peter Aschner, who had attended the textile school in Vienna, worked as a weaver in exile. He was married twice and had a total of four children from both marriages. In England he met the journalist Ilse Maria b. Römer from Vienna, who became his second wife. Both of them returned to Vienna in 1945-46 and worked as a journalist there. Among other things Peter Aschner published for the Wiener Tagebuch and the International Presseschau, he also worked as a translator. He died in Vienna in 1984. Emil Aschner's daughter Eva became an interpreter, returned to Prague, married Walter Vergeiner and had a child with him. She died in Prague in 2014. Two of his four brothers were able to survive in exile: Bernhard Aschner (1883–1960) became a respected doctor, was married to Johanna b. King and had a child with her. He is considered a pioneer of endocrinology and died in New York City. Felix Aschner (1888–1959) emigrated to South America, was married twice and had three children. He died in Bogotá.
	HERE LIVED; RICHARD ASCHNER; BORN 1886; DEPORTED 1941; TO ŁÓDŹ; MURDERED 1942; EBENDORT	Milady Horákové 848/90; 50.099452°N 14.418313°E	Richard Aschner was born on 1 November 1886 in Vienna. His parents were Samuel Aschner and Paula b. Bluestar. He had four brothers. He married Alice b. Zimbler (see below). The couple had one child. The last place of residenceof the couple before deportation was in Prague XII, Italská 18. On 26 October 1941 Richard Aschner, his wife and his brother Emil were transported from Prague to the Łódź Ghetto with transport C. Their transport numbers were 421, 495 and 496. There he was murdered by the Nazi regime on May 11, 1942. His wife and brother died in the wake of the Shoah. Two other brothers could survive, Dr. Bernhard Aschner in New York and Felix Aschner in Bogotá.
	HERE LIVED; ALICE ASCHNEROVÁ; BORN 1896; DEPORTED 1941; TO ŁÓDŹ; MURDERED; EBENDORT	Milady Horákové 848/90; 50°05′58″N 14°25′06″E	Alice Aschnerová b. Zimbler was born on 25 April 1896 in Vienna. Her parents were Josef Zimbler (1855–1936) and Karoline b. Donath (1868–1923). She married Richard Aschner (see above). The couple had one child. The last address of Alice Aschnerová and her husband before deportation was in Prague XII, Italská 18. On October 26, 1941, Alice Aschnerová, her husband and his brother Emil were transported from Prague to the Łódź Ghetto by transport C. Their transport numbers were 421, 495 and 496. There, all three family members were murdered by the Nazi regime. The fate of her child is unknown.
	HERE LIVED; AŘNOST GLASER; BORN 1898; DEPORTED 1941; TO ŁÓDŹ; MURDERED	Nad Královskou oborou 203/23; 50°06′11″N 14°25′09″E	Ařnost Glaser was born on 15 August 1898. His parents were Moric Glaser and Julie b. Pánková. He was self-employed and married Dr. jur. Irma b. Schwarzová. The couple had at least two daughters, Eva and Alexandra (b. 1930). On 21 October 1941, Ařnost Glaser was deported together with his wife and daughters with transport B to the Łódź Ghetto. Their transport numbers were 468, 469 and 471 of 1,003. There, Ařnost Glaser, his wife and their younger daughter were murdered by the Nazi regime. The registration to Yad Vashem was made by his daughter Eva in 1991. She was then called Pleskotová and lived in Prague.
	HERE LIVED; ALEXANDRA GLASEROVÁ; BORN 1930; DEPORTED 1941; TO ŁÓDŹ; MURDERED	Nad Královskou oborou 203/23; 50°06′11″N 14°25′09″E	Alexandra Glaserová was born on 11 January 1930. Her parents were Ařnost Glaser and Dr. Irma b. Schwarzová. She had at least one sister, Eva (born 1925). She was a student and was deported to the Łódź Ghetto on 21 October 1941 together with her parents and sister. There the 11-year-old girl was murdered by the Nazi regime, as were his parents. The report to Yad Vashem was made by her sister Eva in 1991. She was then called Pleskotová and lived in Prague.
	HERE LIVED; DR.JUR. IRMA; GLASEROVÁ; BORN 1901; DEPORTED 1941; TO ŁÓDŹ; MURDERED	Nad Královskou oborou 203/23; 50°06′11″N 14°25′09″E	Dr. jur. Irma Glaserová b. Schwarzová was born on 2 August 1901 in Žatec. Her parents were Sigmund Schwarz and Kamila b. Töpferová. She studied law and married Ařnost Glaser. The couple had at least two daughters, Eva (born 1925) and Alexandra (born 1930). Together with her husband and daughters, Irma Glaserová was deported with transport B to the Łódź Ghetto In 1941. Their transport numbers were 468, 469 and 471 from 1,003. There, Irma Glaserová, her husband and their younger daughter were murdered by the Nazi regime. The report to Yad Vashem was made by her daughter Eva in 1991. She was then called Pleskotová and lived in Prague.
	HERE LIVED; DR. OTOKAR GUTH; BORN 1882; DEPORTED 1943; TO THERESIENSTADT; MURDERED 14.8.1943; EBENDORT	Na Zátorce 673/26; 50°06′05″N 14°24′51″E	Otokar Guth was born on 9 May 1882 in Lety. His parents were Leopold Guth and Wilhelmine. He graduated and married Hermína b. Hellerová. The couple had at least one daughter, Anna, born September 24, 1916. The last place of residence of the couple before deportation was in Prague I, Celetná 12. On July 5, 1943, the two were deported with Transport De from Prague to the Theresienstadt concentration camp. Their transport numbers were 538 and 539 of 604. On 14 August 1943 Dr. Otokar Guth was murdered by the Nazi regime in Theresienstadt. The official cause of death was heart failure. His wife was gassed in Auschwitz the following year. His daughter Anna married Bedřich Hellmann (born 1915) at an unknown date . The two had a son, Jan, who was able to survive the Shoah.
	HERE LIVED; HERMÍNA GUTHOVÁ; BORN 1885; DEPORTED 1943; TO THERESIENSTADT; 1944 TO AUSCHWITZ; MURDERED	Na Zátorce 673/26; 50°06′05″N 14°24′51″E	Hermína Guthová b. Hellerová, also Herma, was born on 23 July 1885. She married Dr. Otokar Guth The couple had at least one daughter, Anna, born on September 24, 1916. The last freely chosen address of the couple before deportation was in Prague I, Celetná 12. On July 5, 1943, the two were deported by transport De from Prague to the Theresienstadt concentration camp. Their transport numbers were 538 and 539 of 604. On 14 August 1943 her husband was killed in Theresienstadt. Over a year later, on 23 October 1944, Hermína Guthová was deported and transported to Auschwitz concentration camp with Transport Et and murdered there. Their transport numbers were 1,158 from 1,714. The fate of her daughter Anna and her husband Bedřich Hellmann is unknown. The two had a son, Jan, who was able to survive the Shoah.
	HERE LIVED; RŮŽENA LINDTOVÁ; BORN 1866; DEPORTED 1942; TO THERESIENSTADT; MURDERED 13.3.1943; EBENDORT	Ovenecká 98/43; 50°06′08″N 14°25′22″E	Růžena Lindtová was born on 5 December 1866. Her last residence in front of deportation was in Prague VII, Schillerova 43. On July 27, 1942, she was deported to Theresienstadt concentration camp by transport AAu. Their transport number was 250 from 1,002. Růžena Lindtová was murdered on March 13, 1943, in Theresienstadt.
	HERE LIVED; RUDOLF PICK; BORN 1885; DEPORTED 1942; TO THERESIENSTADT; MURDERED	Ovenecká 98/43; 50°06′08″N 14°25′22″E	There were two citizens in Prague named Rudolf Pick, who were born in 1885, deported to Theresienstadt concentration camp in 1942 and subsequently murdered by the Nazi regime. The older Rudolf Pick was born on 8 March 1885. His last residential address before deportation was in Prague XII, Balbínova 16. On May 15, 1942, he was deported from Prague to Theresienstadt by transport Au1. His transport number was 513 from 1,001. On May 17, 1942, he was deported from Theresienstadt to Lublin by transport Ay. His transport number was 513 out of 1,000. He was murdered by the NS-regime. The younger Rudolf Pick was born on March 24, 1885, in the town of Hošť in the town of Kostelec nad Černými lesy. His parents were Heinrich Pick (1839–1908) and Elisabeth geb. Bondy, also Alžběta (1847–1898). He had five sisters and a brother. He was married to Marketa (1893–1992), who came from Kharkiv in today's Ukraine. The couple apparently had three children. His last residential address before deportation was in Prague XIII, Nad Primaskou 10. On 10 August 1942 he was deported from Prague to Theresienstadt by transport Ba. His transport number was 721 from 1.474. On August 20, 1942, he was deported from Theresienstadt to Riga by transport Bb. His transport number was 878 from 1,001. He was assassinated by the S-regime. It is not certain which of the two victims the Stolperstein was dedicated to.
	HERE LIVED; DR. RER. NAT. JAROMÍR; ŠÁMAL; BORN 1900; IMPRISONED 1942; EXECUTED 5.6.1942; IN PRAG	Uralská 690/9; 50°06′09″N 14°24′08″E	Dr. rer. nat. Jaromír Šámal was born on 2 July 1900 in Prague. His parents were Přemysl Šámal, a lawyer and politician, and Anna Šámalová. One of his great-grandfathers was Tomáš Černý (1840–1909), Lord Mayor of Prague. He graduated in zoology and specialized in insects. He married Milada b. Cebeová (see below), who supported him in his research work and was involved in two of his publications as co-author. He taught and did research as a lecturer and later as a professor at the Technical University in Prague. The couple had two children, Jiří (1933–1976) and Alena (1937–2003). After the German occupation of the country in March 1939 and the closure of the Czech universities in November 1939 Šámal lost his job. His father and he joined the resistance movement. He was one of the members of the Revolutionary National Committee of the Czech intelligentsia. His father was arrested in January 1940 and died in March 1941 after the Gestapo imprisonment in Berlin. He was arrested in May 1942 and executed by the Nazi regime in Prague on June 5, 1942. His wife was arrested when she wanted to inquire information, and was then deported to Auschwitz concentration camp. Both children, then nine and five years old, were taken into custody by the National Socialists and deported to Łódź together with the children of the exterminated village of Lidice. Afterwards, Jiří and Alena were given to a German family for"Germanization". After the end of the Nazi regime the children were found again and entrusted to their uncle for education. The daughter was later called Veselovská because of a marriage. His wife survived the concentration camp.
	HERE LIVED; DR. MILADA; ŠÁMALOVÁ; BORN 1906; IMPRISONED 1942; SURVIVED	Uralská 690/9; 50°06′09″N 14°24′08″E	Dr. Milada Šámalová b. Cebeová was born on 11 April 1906. Her parents were the doctor Jindřich Cebe (1870–1953) and Antonia b. Feyrerová (1874–1953). She completed a doctorate and married the entomologist Jaromír Šámal (see above), son of Přemysl Šámal and Anna Šámalová. She supported her husband in his research and was involved in two of his publications as co-author. The couple had two children, Jiří (1933–1976) and Alena (1937–2003). After the German occupation of the country in March 1939 and the closure of the Czech universities in November 1939, the husband and lawmaker joined the resistance movement. Her father-in-law was arrested in January 1940 and died in March 1941 after the Gestapo imprisonment in Berlin. Her husband was arrested in May 1942 and executed on June 5, 1942 by the Nazi regime in Prague. Milada Šámalová was arrested and sent to Auschwitz concentration camp, when she wanted to inquire about her husband at the Gestapo. Both children, nine and five years old, were taken into custody by the National Socialists and deported to Łódź Ghetto together with the children from the destroyed village of Lidice. Afterwards, Jiří and Alena were given to a German family for"Germanization". After the end of the Nazi regime the children were found again and entrusted to their uncle for education. The daughter was later called Veselovská because of a marriage. Milada Šámalová was able to survive the concentration camp, she died on 12 September 1981 and was buried in the cemetery of the Basilica of St. Peter and Paul on the Vyšehrad.
	HERE LIVED; JIŘÍ SCHICK; BORN 1896; DEPORTED; TO THERESIENSTADT; MURDERED 1944; EBENDORT	Ovenecká 330/44; 50°06′08″N 14°25′25″E	Jiří Schick was born on 15 August 1896 in Benešov. His parents were Moritz Schick (1862–1922) and Camilla geb. Schneider (1872–1916). He had two brothers, Arnošt (1898–1915) and Antonin (1901–1930). He was married to Anna Reichner (1896–1939). The couple had at least one daughter, Eva, who married Fred Beckmann (born March 8, 1908). His last place of residence before deportation was in Prague XIV, U pankrácké vozovny 838. Jiří Schick was deported to the concentration camp Theresienstadt at an unknown time. He was murdered by the Nazi regime on 27 September 1944 in the small NS fortress there. His daughter and son-in-law were able to emigrate to the United States. They had two children. Jiří Fate grand daughter Paulette Nessim became board member of the Los Angeles Museum of the Holocaust.
	HERE LIVED; DR. ING. BEDŘICH; SGALITZER; BORN 1886; DEPORTED 1942; TO THERESIENSTADT-KLEINE FESTUNG; MURDERED 1944; EBENDORT	Milady Horákové 854/78; 50°05′59″N 14°25′12″E	Dr. Ing. Bedřich Sgalitzer also Fritz, was born on 2 June 1886. His parents were Karl Sgalitzer (1852–1935) and Ottilie b. Porges (1861–1936). He had five brothers and three sisters. He was married to Alžběta b. Schubert. The couple is said to have at least two children whose fate is unresolved. Bedřich Sgalitzer and his wife were deported to Theresienstadt concentration camp in 1942, where they were imprisoned in the small fortress. Bedřich Sgalitzer was murdered there on 24 November 1944. His wife was killed on January 5, 1945. At least three of his brothers and one sister were also killed in the Shoah: On 13 June 1942, Leo and his wife were deported from Theresienstadt to an unknown place and subsequently murdered. On October 2, 1944, Dr. Richard Sgalitzer was murdered in Theresienstadt, seven days later his wife was deported to Auschwitz and murdered there. Ida Hellerová was deported to Auschwitz and murdered on October 19, 1944. Felix Sgalitzer and his wife were deported to Auschwitz and murdered on October 23, 1944. Their daughter was deported to Auschwitz and murdered five days later.
	HERE LIVED; ALBTA; SGALITZEROVÁ; BORN 1909; DEPORTED 1942; TO THERESIENSTADT-KLEINE FESTUNG; DIED 5.1.1945; EBENDORT	Milady Horákové 854/78; 50°05′59″N 14°25′12″E	Alžběta Sgalitzerová b. Schubertová, also Elisabeth, was born on 7 August 1909. Her parents were Dipl. Ing. Carl Schubert (1861–1950) and Odilia b. Sternberger (1887–1942). She was married to Dr. Ing. Bedřich Sgalitzer. The couple are said to have at least two children whose fate has not been resolved. Alžběta Sgalitzerová and her husband were deported to Theresienstadt concentration camp in 1942, where they were imprisoned in the small fortress. Bedřich Sgalitzer was murdered there on 24 November 1944. Alžběta Sgalitzerová died on January 5, 1945.
	HERE LIVED; AŘNOST SPITZ; BORN 1896; DEPORTED 1941; TO THERESIENSTADT; MURDERED	Sukova 559/3; 50°06′07″N 14°24′00″E	Ařnost Spitz was born on 4 October 1896 in Německý Brod. He was married to Anna b. Picková, the couple had two daughters, Marie (born 1928) and Sonja (born 1931). The last place of residence of the family before deportation was in Prague XIX, Hoferova 3. On 10 December 1941 father, mother and daughter were transported from Prague to the concentration camp Theresienstadt by transport L. Their transport numbers were 295, 296 and 298 of 1,006. There, the family was held captive for almost three years and was finally separated. On 28 September 1944, Ařnost Spitz was deported to Auschwitz concentration camp by Transport Ek. His transport number was 286 out of 1,550. Eight days later, on October 6, 1944, Anna and Sonja Spitzová were deported to Auschwitz. In the end, all three were murdered by the Nazi regime, however the date and exact place of death are only known of Ařnost Spitz: the 18 January 1945 in the Dachau concentration camp. The fate of his daughter Marie is unclear..
	HERE LIVED; ANNA SPITZOVÁ; BORN 1902; DEPORTED 1941; TO THERESIENSTADT; MURDERED	Sukova 559/3; 50°06′07″N 14°24′00″E	Anna Spitzová was born on 17 February 1902 in Brandýs nad Labem. She was married to Ařnost Spitz, the couple had two daughters, Marie (born 1928) and Sonja (born 1931). The family's last place of residence before deportation was in Prague XIX, Hoferova 3. On 10 December 1941 father, mother and daughter were brought from Prague to Theresienstadt concentration camp by transport L t. Their transport numbers were 295, 296 and 298 of 1,006. There, the family was interned for almost three years and were finally separated. On 28 September 1944, Ařnost Spitz was deported to Auschwitz concentration camp by Transport Ek. Eight days later, on 6 October 1944, Anna and Sonja Spitzová were deported to Auschwitz. Their transport numbers were 75 and 77 of 2,500. In the end, all three were murdered by the Nazi regime, but the place and date of death are known of Ařnost Spitz: January 18, 1945 in the Dachau concentration camp. The fate of her daughter Marie is unclear.
	HERE LIVED; SONJA SPITZOVÁ; BORN 1902; DEPORTED 1941; TO THERESIENSTADT; MURDERED	Sukova 559/3; 50°06′07″N 14°24′00″E	Sonja Spitzová was born on 17 February 1931. Her parents were Ařnost Spitz and Anna b. Picková. The last residential address of the family before deportation was in Prague XIX, Hoferova 3. On 10 December 1941 father, mother and daughter were transported from Prague to Theresienstadt concentration camp. by transport L. Their transport numbers were 295, 296 and 298 of 1,006. There, the family was held captive for almost three years. Dětské hry, 23 April 1944 Sonja Spitzová used to paint in Theresienstadt. One of her pictures, showing a ball-playing youngster called Dětské hry (children's games), is owned by the Jewish Museum in Prague. [66] Finally, the family was separated on September 28, 1944, and Ařnost Spitz was deported to Auschwitz concentration camp by Transport Ek. Eight days later, on October 6, 1944, Anna and Sonja Spitzová were deported to Auschwitz. Their transport numbers were 75 and 77 of 2,500. In the end, all three were murdered by the Nazi regime, but the date of death is only known of Ařnost Spitz: 18 January 1945 in Dachau concentration camp. The fate of her sister is unclear.
	HERE LIVED; ANTONIE ELSE; TAMLER; BORN 1913; DEPORTED 1942; TO THERESIENSTADT; 1942 TO IZBICA; MURDERED	Československé armády 406/10; 50°06′02″N 14°24′12″E	Antonie Else Tamler was born in Bukowina in the district of Zastawna in May 1913. Her parents were Abraham Ber Tamler (1876–1933) and Sabine or Sabina b. Neumann (1887–1942). She had three siblings, the brothers Ernst (1911–1977) and Samuel Edward (1919–1948) and sister Edith, who was able to survive the Shoah as well. Antonie Else Tamler was probably married twice, the first time to a man named Rozsypalov, the second time to Vladimir or Vladea Leitner. Their last address before deportation was in Prague XIX. There are two narratives of her death. According to Yad Vashem, she died in the Dachau concentration camp in 1942. According to holocaust.cz, she was deported on February 8, 1942, with transport W from Prague to Theresienstadt concentration camp and from there on 17 March 1942 with transport Ab to the ghetto Izbica, where she was murdered. Their transport numbers were first 619 from 1,002, most recently 190 from 1,000. Her mother was also murdered in the Shoah in 1942. The reports of her death (and of her mother) to Yad Vashem were made by her sister in 1999. She lived in Jerusalem at that time.

== Dejvice ==
Image	Inscription	Location	Life
	HERE LIVED; LUDVIKA BOŘKOVCOVA; BORN 1882; DEPORTED; 1942 TO THERESIENSTADT; 1942 TO RIGA; MURDERED	Zelená 1083/17; 50°06′24″N 14°23′34″E	Ludvika Bořkovcová was born on 16 March 1882. Their last place of residence before deportation was in Prague XII, Rollerova 5. On 3 August 1942, she was deported from Prague to Theresienstadt concentration camp by transport AAw. Her transport number was 780 from 1,001. Two and a half weeks later, on 20 August 1942, she was deported to Riga by transport Bb. Their transport number was 708. Of the 1,001 women, men and children of this transport, not one survived. All were murdered by the Nazi regime.

== Date of placement ==
The Stolpersteine in Prague were personally placed by Gunter Demnig on the following days: October 8, 2008, November 7, 2009, June 12, 2010, July 13–15, 2011 and July 17, 2013 (as indicated on the website of the artist Events). Further placements were made on 28 October 2012 but are not mentioned on the website.

== Sources ==
- Holocaust.cz, tschechische Holocaust-Datenbank (deutschsprachige Version)
- Stolpersteine.eu, Demnigs Website
