= Veleslavín =

- Cadastral Area of Prague
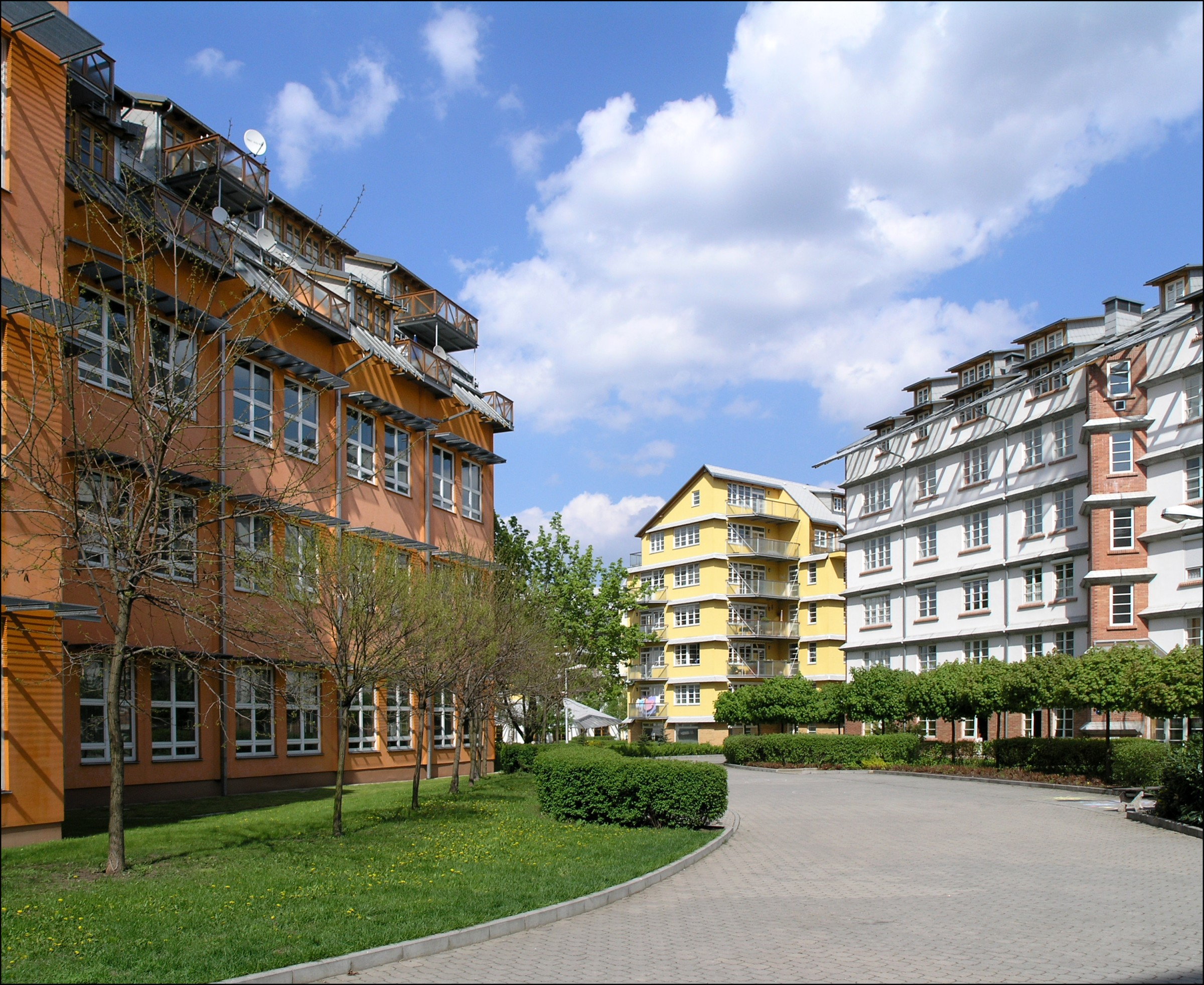
- Hvězda apartment buildings designed by Vlado Milunić.

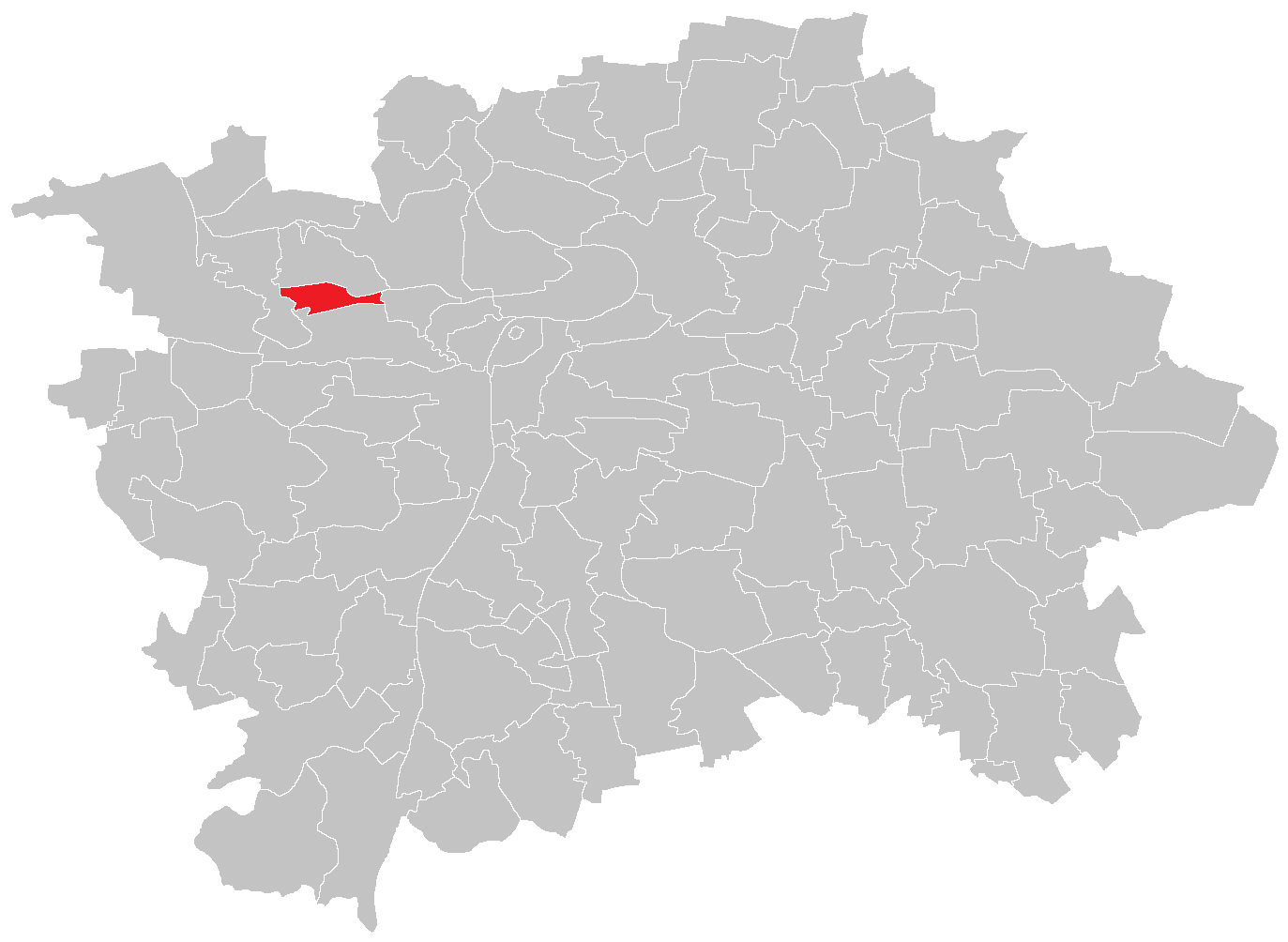
- Location of Stodůlky in Prague
- Coordinates: 50°05′31″N 14°20′54″E
- Country: Czech Republic
- Region: Prague
- District: Prague 6

Area
  - Total: 1.31 km^{2} (0.51 sq mi)

Population (2021)
  - Total: 6,614
  - Density: 5,050/km^{2} (13,100/sq mi)
- Time zone: UTC+1 (CET)
  - Summer (DST): UTC+2 (CEST)
- Postal code: 162 00

Veleslavín (Czech pronunciation: [ˈvɛlɛslaviːn], German: Weleslawin) is a district of Prague, part of Prague 6, situated in the west of the city approximately 5 km from Ruzyně International Airport. It was probably founded in the 10th or 11th century, first recorded in records from the nearby Břevnov Monastery, and has been part of Prague since 1922.

Veleslavín chateau, a single-floored baroque chateau located at the address Veleslavínská 1, is recorded as a cultural monument. The southern part of Veleslavín is part of the housing estate named Petřiny, the remainder of which is in Břevnov, and contains a number of modernist buildings designed by Vlado Milunić.

== Demographics ==
Historical population

Year	Pop.	±%
1869	229	—
1880	470	+105.2%
1890	550	+17.0%
1900	863	+56.9%
1910	1,340	+55.3%
1921	1,779	+32.8%
1930	2,536	+42.6%
1950	2,912	+14.8%

Year	Pop.	±%
1961	4,939	+69.6%
1970	8,808	+78.3%
1980	7,660	−13.0%
1991	6,032	−21.3%
2001	6,137	+1.7%
2011	6,485	+5.7%
2021	6,614	+2.0%

Source: Censuses

== See also ==
- Praha-Veleslavín railway station
- Nádraží Veleslavín (Prague Metro)
- Daniel Adam z Veleslavína, lexicographer and writer
