= Nádraží Veleslavín (Prague Metro) =

Prague metro station

Coordinates: 50.0959°N 14.3474°E

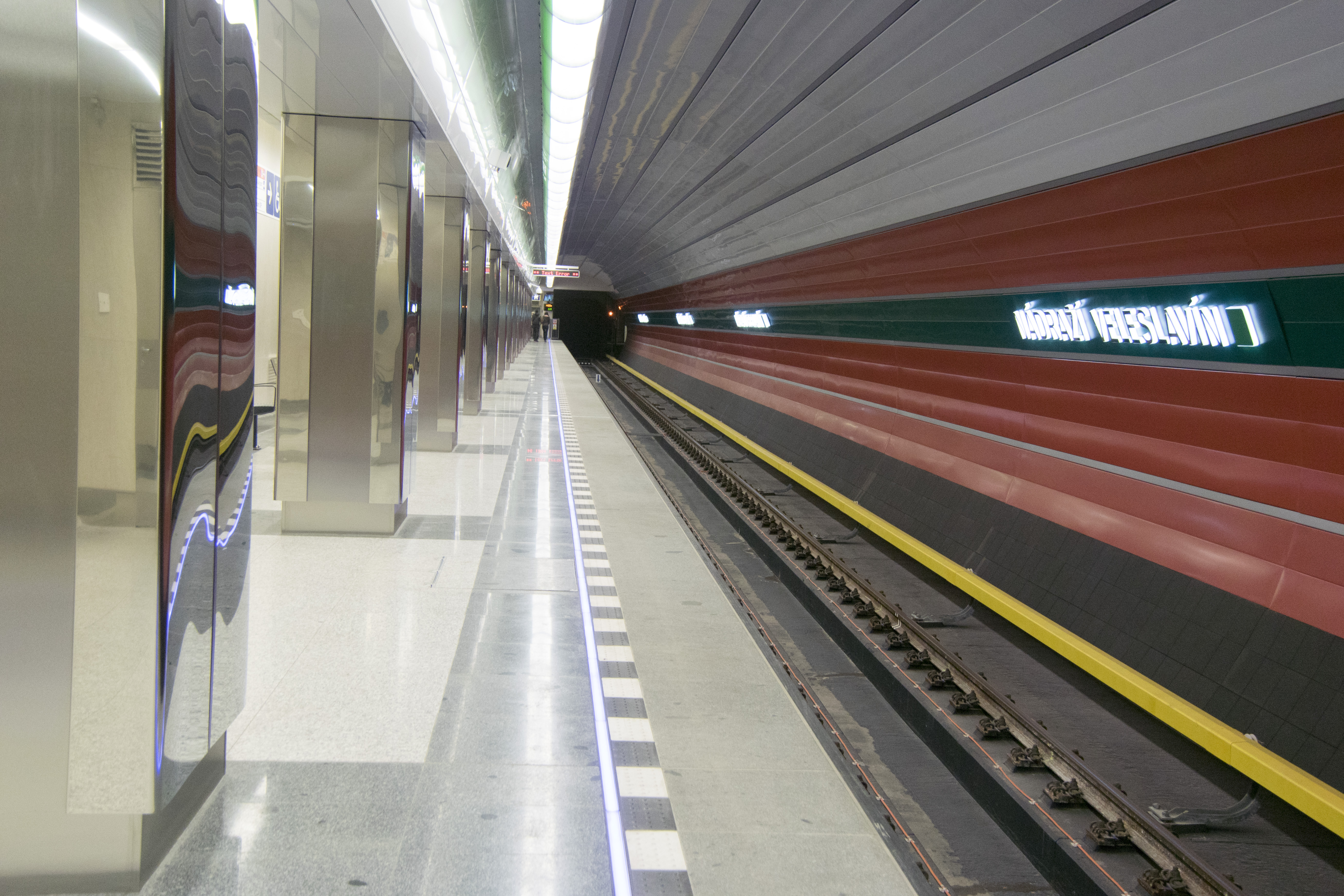

General information
- Location: Evropská street Veleslavín, Prague 6 Prague; Czech Republic
- System: Prague Metro
- Platforms: 1 island platform
- Tracks: 2

Construction
- Structure type: Underground
- Depth: 205 m (673 ft)
- Accessible: Yes

History
- Opened: 6 April 2015; 11 years ago

Services
Preceding station	Prague Metro	Following station
Petřiny toward Nemocnice Motol	Line A	Bořislavka toward Depo Hostivař
Location

Nádraží Veleslavín (Czech pronunciation: [ˈnaːdraʒiː ˈvɛlɛslaviːn], English: Veleslavín Station) is a station on Line A of the Prague Metro, located in Veleslavín, Prague 6. It opened on 6 April 2015, together with Bořislavka, Petřiny and Nemocnice Motol stations.

== History ==
Nádraží Veleslavín station opened on 6 April 2015. Initially, the station did not have escalator leading to the vestibule to the street, so people arriving to or going from the airport had to be helped by special staff. In 2017 a decision was made to build additional escalators at a cost of 33 million Czech crowns.

The planned name for the station was initially just Veleslavín. Authorities later changed it to the current station name, due to it being next to the Praha-Veleslavín station as well as for the nearby tram and bus stops of the same name.

== General information ==
The station is adjacent to the Praha-Veleslavín railway station and a bus terminal which became the new terminus of the 59 t-bus line from Václav Havel Airport and regional buses towards Kladno. The station is 20m below ground level. The station was designed by architect Hana Vermachová.

== Gallery ==
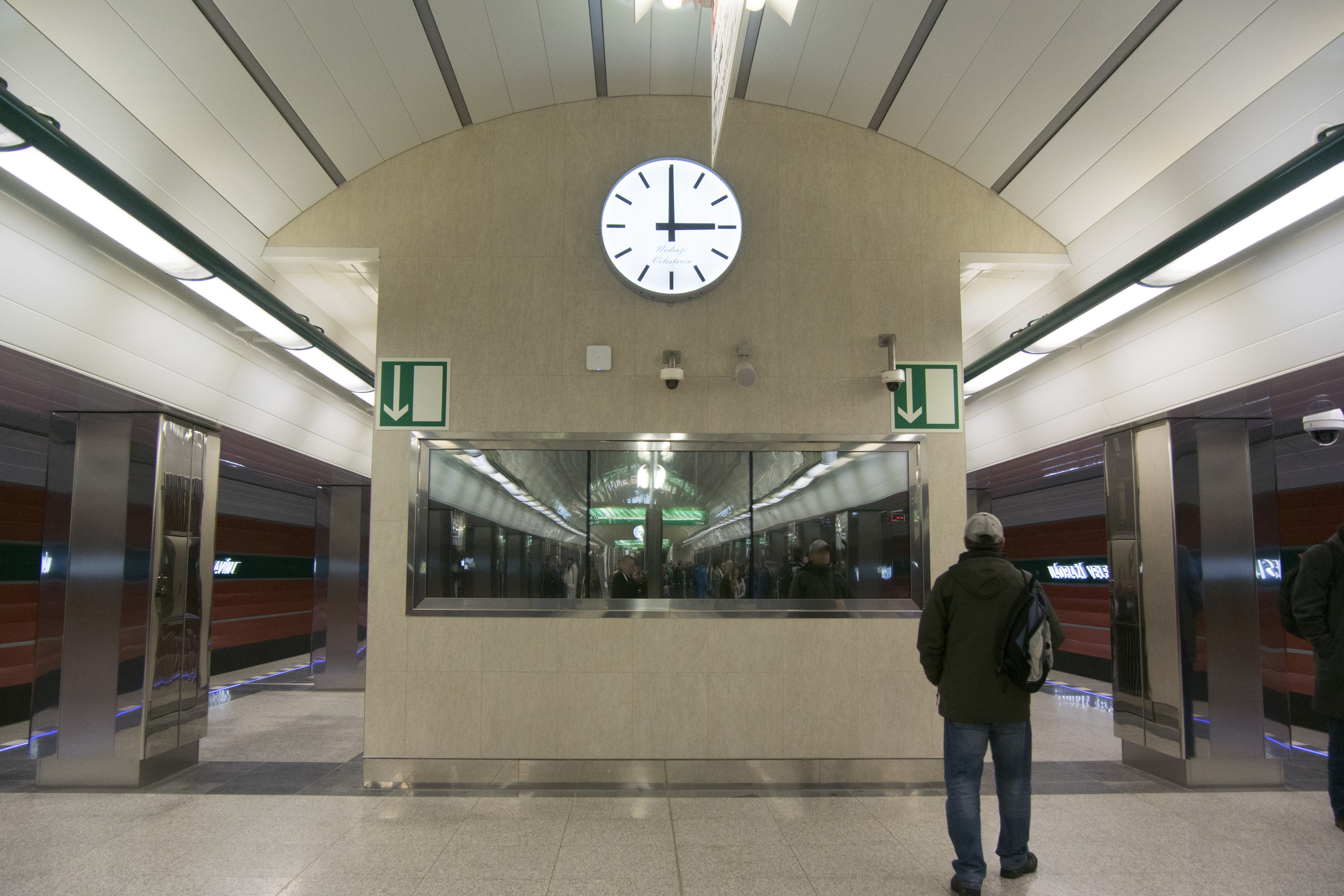
Clock at the end of the station platform.

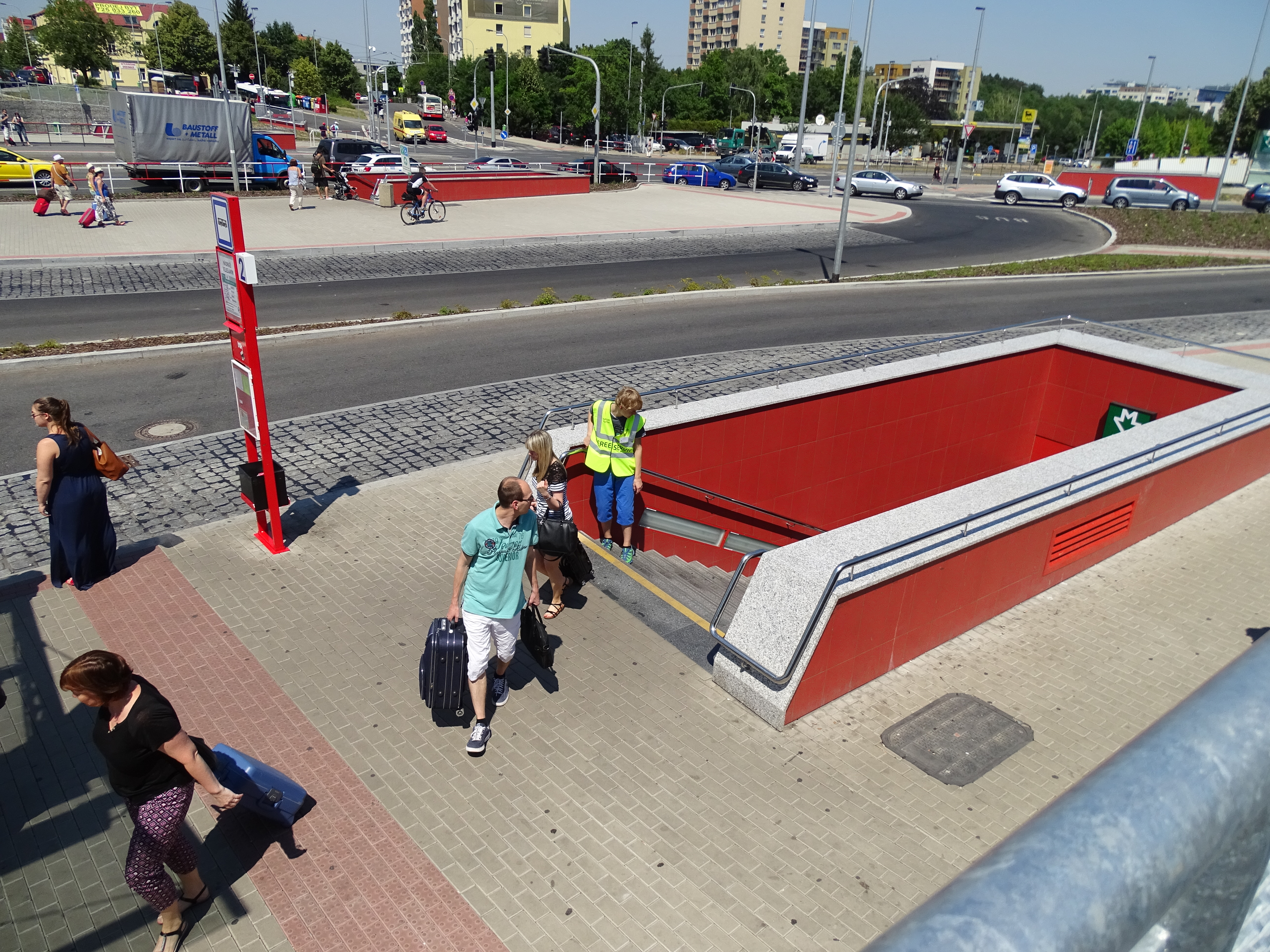
Entrance to the station
