= Vlado Milunić =

Czech architect (1941–2022)

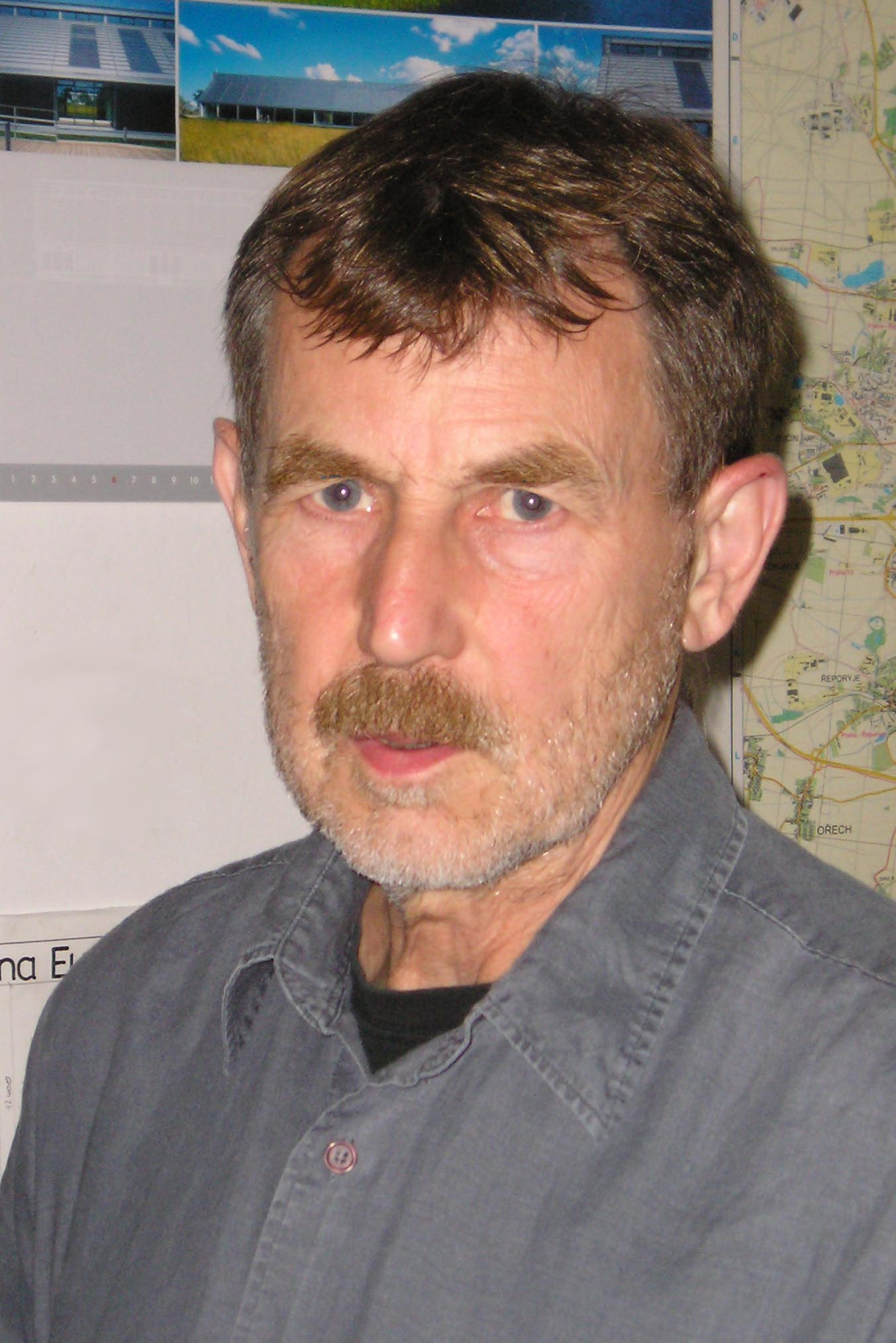
- Milunić in 2008
- Born: 3 March 1941; Zagreb, Yugoslavia
- Died: 17 September 2022 (aged 81)
- Education: Czech Technical University in Prague
- Occupation: Architect
- Buildings: Dancing House

Vladimir Milunić (3 March 1941 – 17 September 2022) was a Czech-Croatian architect. He was noted for designing the "Dancing House" in Prague with Frank Gehry. He also taught at the Czech Technical University in Prague.

== Early life ==
Milunić was born in Zagreb, at the time in Yugoslavia (now Croatia), on 3 March 1941, to a family of Croatian descent. His family moved to the Czechoslovak Socialist Republic when he was 15 or 16. Regarding his nationality, he later stated that he was Czechoslovak and felt Yugoslavian, "as a protest against primitive nationalism". Milunić studied architecture at the Czech Technical University in Prague (CTU), graduating in 1966. He subsequently resided in Paris for three years until 1969 while doing internships.

== Career ==
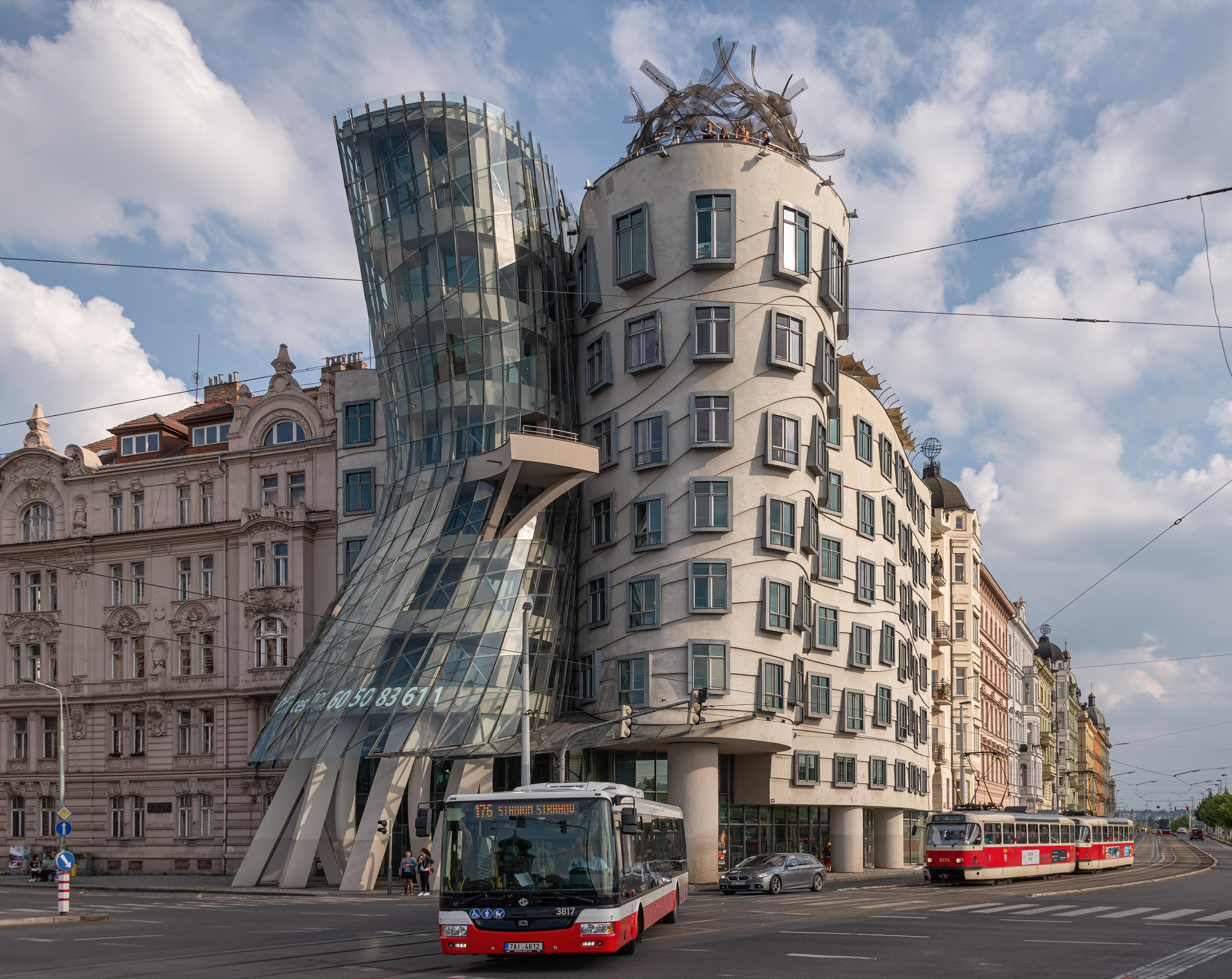
Dancing House in Prague

After returning from Paris, Milunić worked at Gama and Delta – two Prague-based architecture studios – for over two decades. He designed homes for seniors around the city, as well as housing for nurses, during the 1970s and 1980s. Milunić was also a lecturer at CTU (his alma mater). He eventually established his own studio, Studio VM, in 1990.

Milunić first met Václav Havel during the 1980s, when the former's family of six was unable to find sizeable lodgings at a Prague housing estate. The government ultimately assigned the Milunić family a room inside a Secessionist house, which was built by Havel's grandfather at the start of the 20th century and that had been owned by the Havels until its confiscation by the Communist authorities in 1948. The Havels nonetheless continued to reside there, and the two families became neighbours. After Havel's parents died, Milunić was tasked with dividing their apartment between Havel and his brother Ivan in 1986.

Around the time of the Velvet Revolution, Havel reportedly proposed the idea of turning the empty lot next to their residence into a cultural centre to Milunić. Milunić formulated the initial design of the building, but construction was held up because they could not find an investor to fund the project. The lot was eventually purchased by Nationale Nederlanden in 1992, with the structure intended to house offices and hotel rooms. Although the bank sought an architect with an international standing for the project, it chose to keep Milunić in a collaborative capacity given his local knowledge and in recognition of his earlier work on the site. They first asked Jean Nouvel, who turned down the offer, before settling on Frank Gehry. The two collaborated on the "Dancing House", which was finished in 1996 and was recognised as the best design of 1996 by Time magazine. However, the structure was controversial at first, with critics believing that it was disjunctive with its adjacent historical architecture. Milunić acknowledged these criticisms, recounting how the project was once compared to a "gold tooth that spoils a smile". He nevertheless maintained that it was the responsibility of municipal authorities to place limitations on developers in advance of their purchase of a site, adding that "the city's hands are pretty much tied" after that point.

Apart from the Dancing House, Milunić also designed a number of buildings in the Petřiny housing estate in Veleslavín, part of Prague 6. One of the overseas projects he contributed to was the "Czech Quarter" in Shanghai, the brainchild of a local developer that was finished in 2008. Milunić, one of five Czech architects recruited to work on the project, stated that they intended to use Prague "as an inspiration ... not an exact copy".

== Personal life ==
Milunić died on 17 September 2022. He was 81, and suffered from an unspecified serious illness prior to his death.
