= Dancing House =

Building in Prague, Czech Republic

- Tančící dům
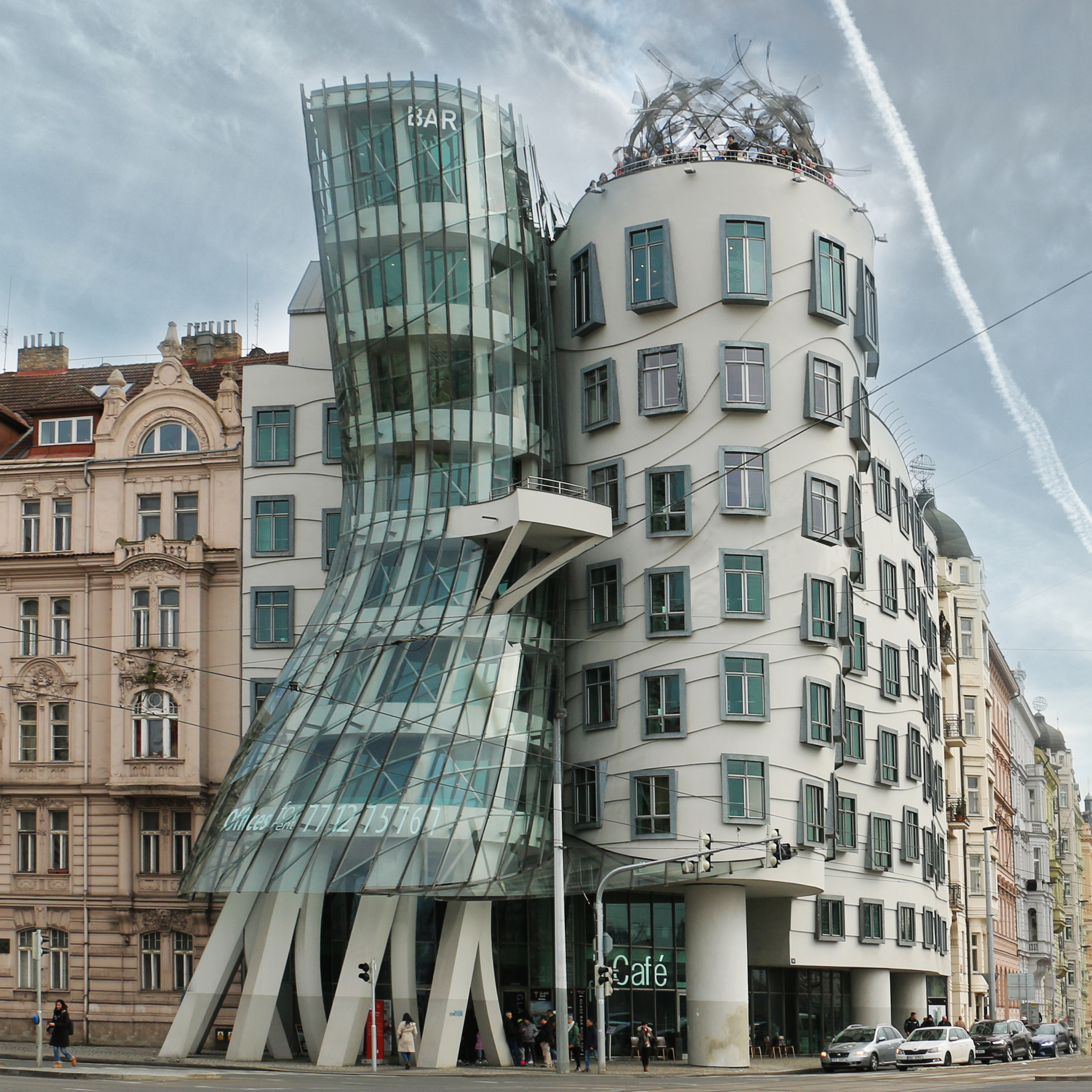
- Interactive map of the Dancing House area
- Former names: Nationale-Nederlanden Building
- Alternative names: Ginger and Fred

General information
- Architectural style: Postmodernism
- Location: Prague, C R, Rašínovo nábřeží 80, Prague 2, 120 00, Prague, Czech Republic
- Coordinates: 50°04′32″N 14°24′51″E
- Construction started: 1992
- Completed: 1996

Design and construction
- Architects: Vlado Milunić, Frank Gehry

The Dancing House (Czech: Tančící dům), or Ginger and Fred, is the nickname given to the Nationale-Nederlanden building on the Rašínovo nábřeží (Rašín Embankment) in Prague, Czech Republic. It was designed by the Croatian-Czech architect Vlado Milunić in cooperation with Canadian-American architect Frank Gehry on a vacant riverfront plot. The building was designed in 1992. The construction, carried out by BESIX, was completed four years later in 1996.

Gehry originally called the house Ginger and Fred (after the dancers Ginger Rogers and Fred Astaire – the house resembles a pair of dancers), but the nickname Ginger & Fred is now mainly used for the restaurant located on the seventh floor of the Dancing House Hotel. Gehry himself later discarded his own idea, as he was "afraid to import American Hollywood kitsch to Prague".

== Origin ==
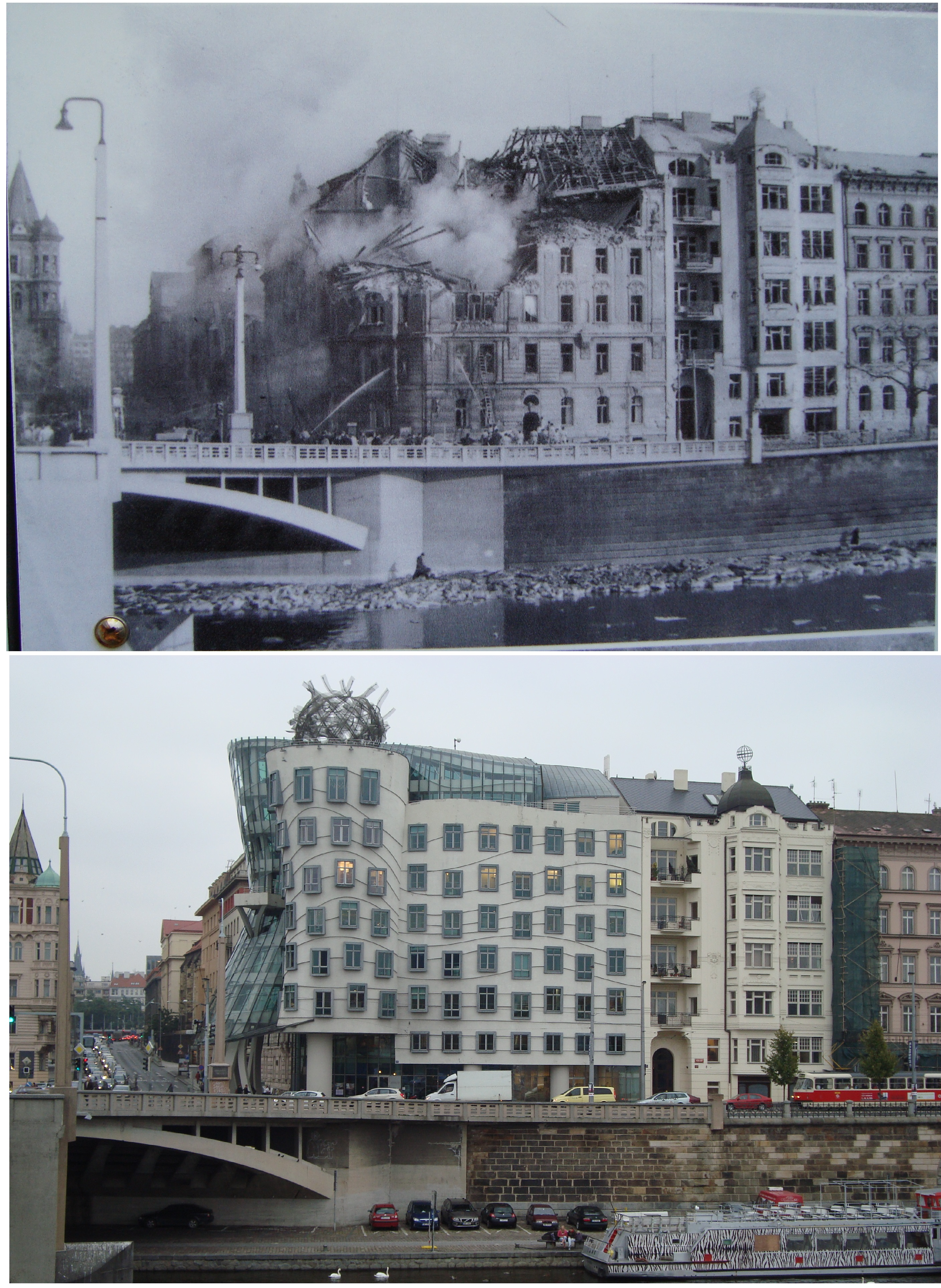
Comparison of Dancing House site in 1945 and 2010

The "Dancing House" is set on a property of great historical significance. Its site was the location of an apartment building destroyed by the U.S. bombing of Prague in 1945. The plot and structure lay decrepit until 1960, when the area was cleared. The neighboring plot was co-owned (until 1948–50, when the Communist regime overtook every larger private property and commercial activities) by the family of Václav Havel, who spent most of his life there. As early as 1986 (during the Communist era), Vlado Milunić, then a respected architect in the Czechoslovak milieu, conceived an idea for a project at the place and discussed it with his neighbour, the then well known (both nationally and internationally) dissident Havel. A few years later, during the Velvet Revolution, Havel became a popular leader and was subsequently elected president of Czechoslovakia. Thanks to his authority, the idea to develop the site grew. Havel eventually decided to have Milunić survey the site, hoping for it to become a cultural center, though this was not the result.

The Dutch insurance company Nationale-Nederlanden (ING Bank from 1991 to 2016) agreed to sponsor the construction of a house onsite. The superbank chose Milunić as the lead designer and asked him to partner with another world-renowned architect to approach the process. The French architect Jean Nouvel turned down the idea because of the small square footage, but the Canadian-American architect Frank Gehry accepted the invitation. Because of the bank's excellent financial state at the time, it was able to offer almost unlimited funding for the project. Starting with their first meeting in 1992 in Geneva, Gehry and Milunić began to develop Milunić's original idea of a building consisting of two parts, static and dynamic ("yin and yang"), which were to symbolize the transition of Czechoslovakia from a communist regime to a parliamentary democracy.

== Structure ==
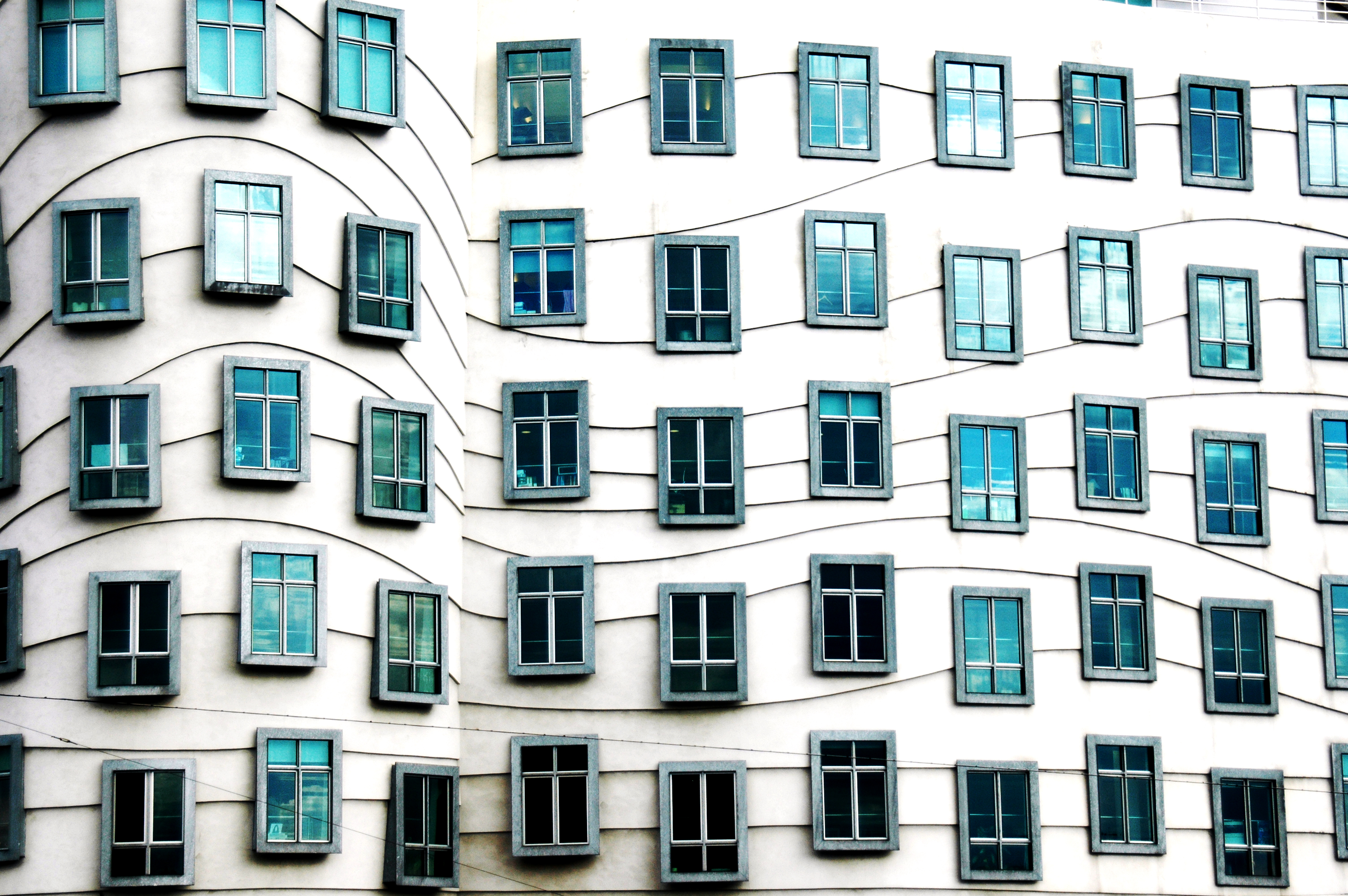
Windows of the Dancing House

The style is known as deconstructivist ("new-baroque" to the designers) architecture due to its unusual shape. The "dancing" shape is supported by 99 concrete panels, each a different shape and dimension. On the top of the building is a large twisted structure of metal nicknamed Medusa.

In the middle of a square of buildings from the eighteenth and nineteenth century, the Dancing House has two main parts. The first is a glass tower that narrows at half its height and is supported by curved pillars; the second runs parallel to the river and is characterized by undulating mouldings and unaligned windows.

Dancers Fred Astaire and Ginger Rogers are represented in the structure. A tower made of rock is used to represent Fred. This tower also includes a metal head. A tower made of glass is used to represent Ginger.

This design was driven mainly by aesthetic considerations: aligned windows would make evident that the building has two more floors, although it is the same height as the two adjacent nineteenth-century buildings. The windows have protruding frames, such as those of paintings, as the designer intended for them to have a three-dimensional effect. The winding mouldings on the façade also serve to confuse perspective and diminish contrast with the surrounding buildings.

== Interior ==
The Czech-British architect Eva Jiřičná designed most of the interior. The building is 9 floors tall and consists of two floors underground. The layout of each of the floors varies due to the asymmetric shape of the building, causing the rooms inside to also be asymmetric. The commercial areas of the building are in the lobby and the first floor. The six floors above are used primarily as office spaces. The ninth floor housed a restaurant. Since the building takes a slim shape, and the building is split into two parts vertically, the office space is limited. To make the most of the space, architect Jiřičná used design elements common in ships and incorporated small hallways into the interior of the building. The total interior of the building is 3,796 sqm.

In 2016, over the course of five months, two floors of the building were renovated and converted into a 21-room hotel by Luxury Suites s.r.o. The hotel also has apartments available in each of the towers named after Fred and Ginger. The Ginger & Fred Restaurant now operates on the seventh floor, and there is now a glass bar on the eighth floor and an art gallery in the building.

== Awards ==
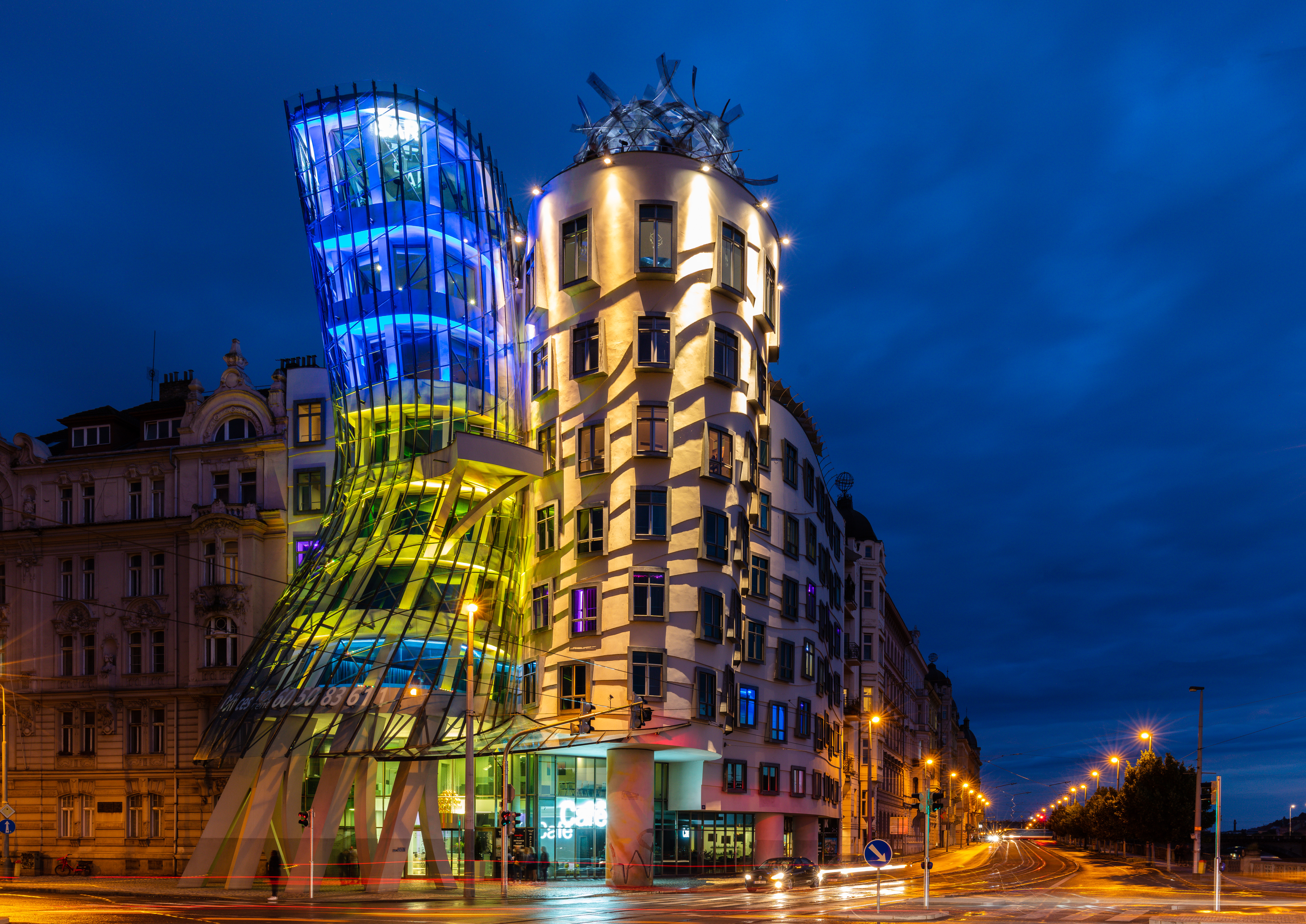
At night

The general shape of the building is now featured on a gold 2,000 Czech koruna coin issued by the Czech National Bank. The coin completes a series called "Ten Centuries of Architecture". The Dancing House won Time magazine's design contest in 1997. The Dancing House was also named one of the five most important buildings in the 1990s by Architekt Magazine.

== Criticism ==
The Dancing House has been called inappropriate in the classical city of Prague. The deconstructivist design is controversial because the house disrupts the Baroque, Gothic, and Art Nouveau buildings for which Prague is famous. The style, shape, heavy asymmetry, and material are considered out of place by some critics and commentators.

== See also ==
- List of works by Frank Gehry
- Krzywy Domek
