= Petřiny (Prague Metro) =

Prague metro station

Coordinates: 50°05′11″N 14°20′43″E

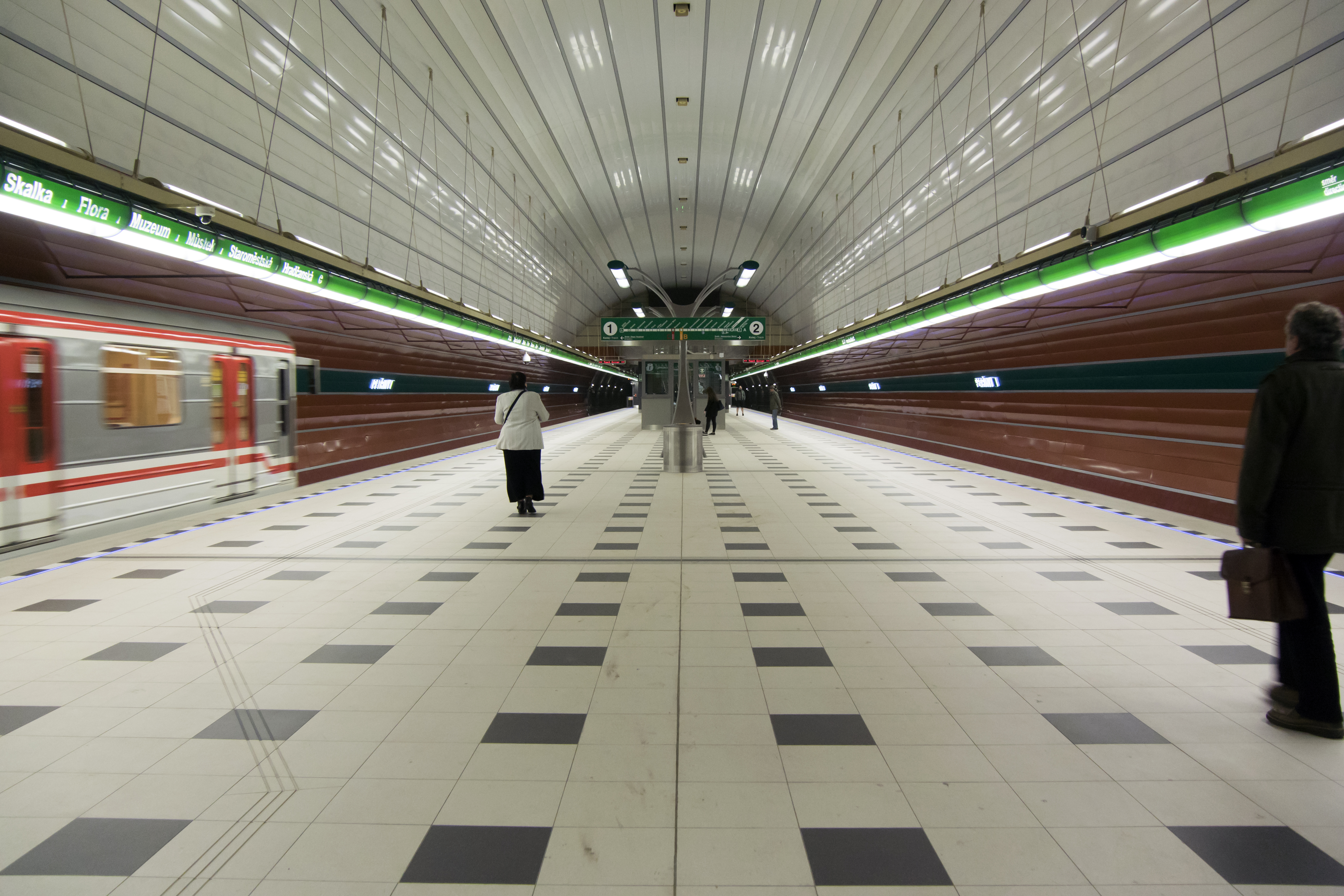

General information
- Location: Brunclíkova street Petřiny, Prague 6 Prague; Czech Republic
- System: Prague Metro
- Platforms: 1 island platform
- Tracks: 2

Construction
- Structure type: Underground
- Depth: 37.6 m (123 ft)
- Accessible: Yes

History
- Opened: 6 April 2015; 11 years ago

Services
Preceding station	Prague Metro	Following station
Nemocnice Motol Terminus	Line A	Nádraží Veleslavín toward Depo Hostivař
Location

Petřiny (Czech pronunciation: [ˈpɛtr̝̊ɪnɪ]) is a station on the Prague Metro. It is one of four stations opened on 6 April 2015 as part of a project to extend Line A, together with Bořislavka, Nádraží Veleslavín and Nemocnice Motol.

== General information ==
Petřiny station is located under Brunclíkova street in Břevnov, Prague 6, next to the Petřiny housing estate, with a connection to a tram and bus stop and the shopping centre and a K+R at Na Petřinách street. A 5-minute walk away, you can also find the Gymnázium nad Alejí, ZŠ Petřiny jih, and ZŠ Petřiny sever schools.

The tunnel of the station is the largest underground structure in the Prague Metro system, at 217m long, 16m high and 22m wide, located 40m below the surface. The station was designed by architect Jiří Pešata.

== Gallery ==
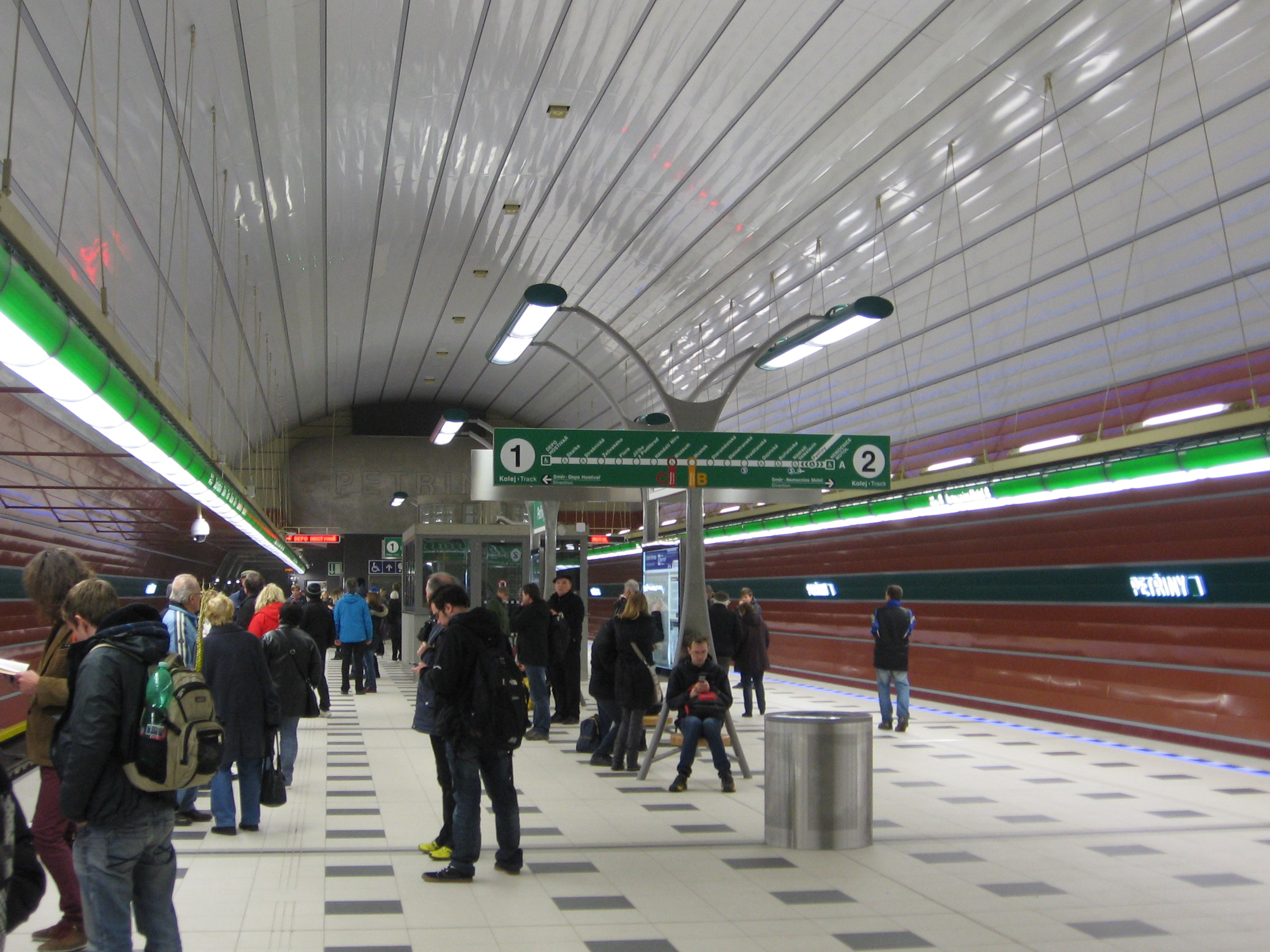
Station platform

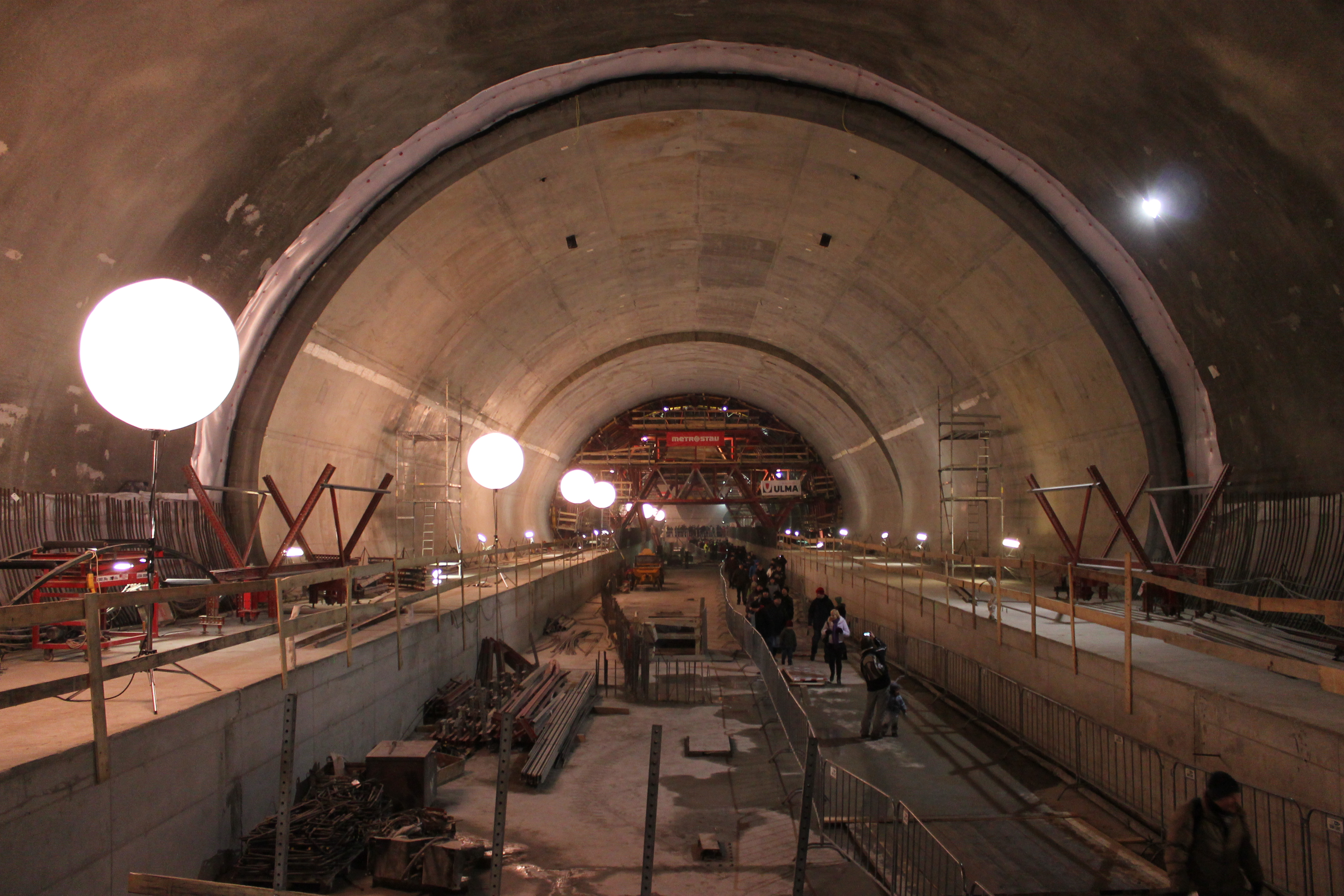
Station under construction in January 2013
