= Praha-Veleslavín railway station =

Railway station in Veleslavín, Czech Republic

Coordinates: 50°5′40.71″N 14°20′46.75″E

Praha-Veleslavín
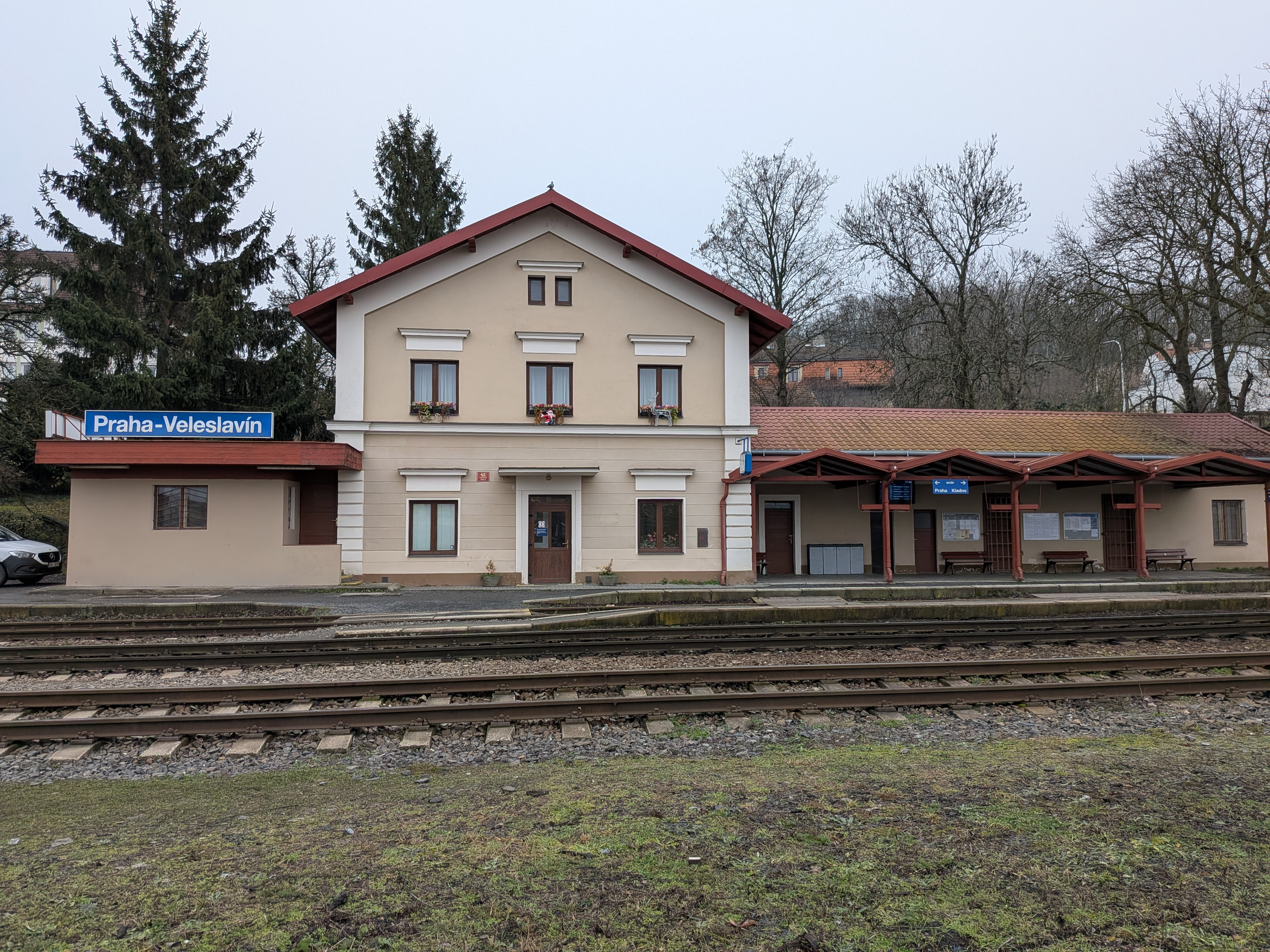
- Station building

General information
- Owner: Czech Republic
- Line: 120 (Praha–Rakovník)
- Platforms: 3
- Tracks: 3

Other information
- Station code: 54572669
- Fare zone: PID: B

History
- Opened: 1863

Services
Preceding station	Esko Prague	Following station
Praha-Dejvice towards Praha Masarykovo nádraží	S5	Praha-Ruzyně towards Kladno
Location

Praha-Veleslavín railway station (Czech: Nádraží Praha-Veleslavín) is located in Veleslavín, Prague 6, on line 120, linking Prague's Masarykovo nádraží with Kladno and Rakovník. The station was opened in 1863 on an already existing line, between Praha-Dejvice and Praha-Ruzyně.

Freight services through this station were discontinued entirely since the 2008 closing of the spur to the nearby heating plant. The station is located a short distance from a tram stop on Evropská třída, which is also connected to Line A of the Prague Metro following completion of the current extension from Dejvická to Motol in 2015. The planned express line from Masarykovo to Ruzyně Airport will pass through Veleslavín, and increase the frequency of trains on the Prague-Kladno line to 4tph (trains per hour) in each direction, compared to today's 1tph.
