= Vokovice =

- Cadastral Area of Prague
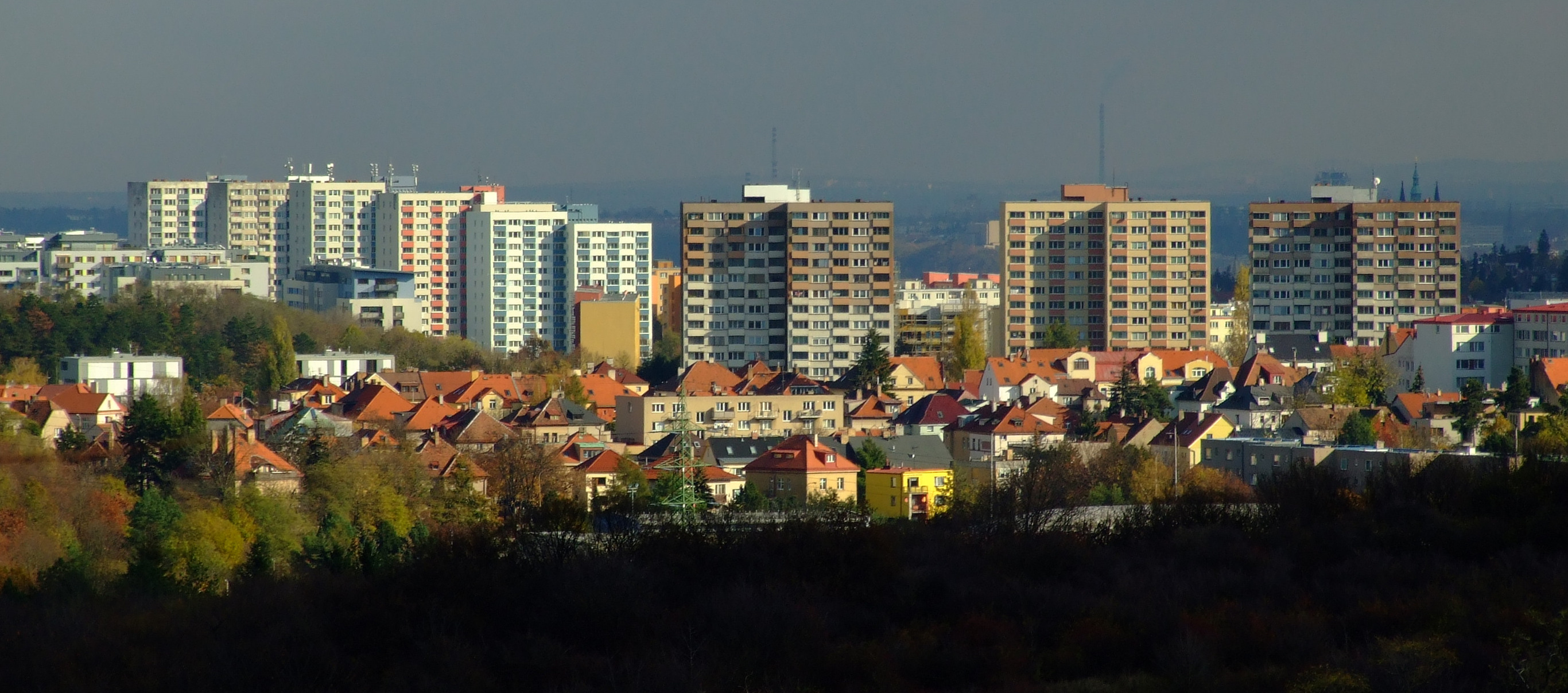
- View of the Červený Vrch housing estate from Divoká Šárka.

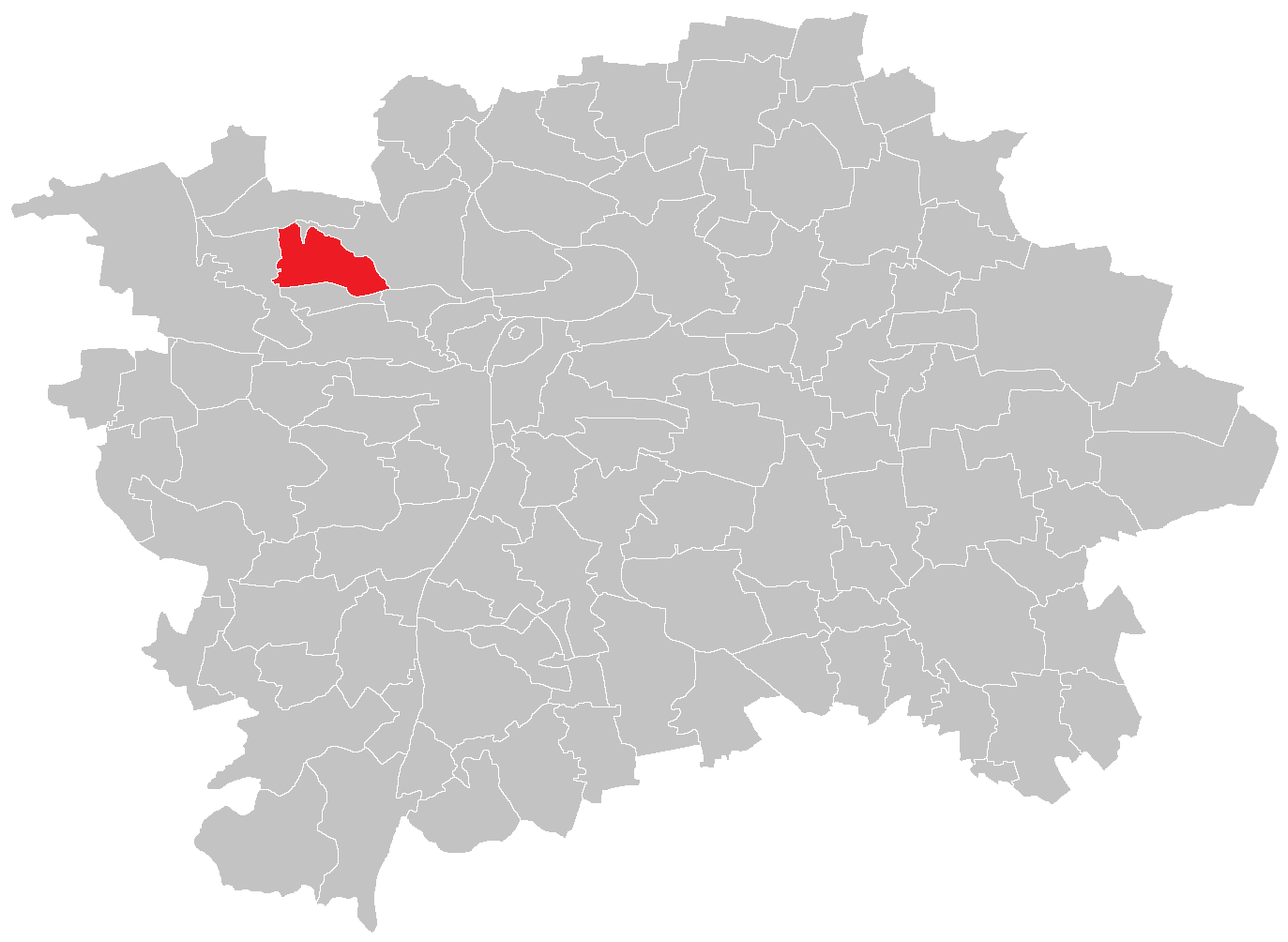
- Location of Vokovice in Prague
- Coordinates: 50°05′56″N 14°20′41″E
- Country: Czech Republic
- Region: Prague
- District: Prague 6

Area
  - Total: 3.52 km^{2} (1.36 sq mi)

Population (2021)
  - Total: 11,083
  - Density: 3,150/km^{2} (8,150/sq mi)
- Time zone: UTC+1 (CET)
  - Summer (DST): UTC+2 (CEST)
- Postal code: 160 00-164 00

Vokovice is a district of Prague city, part of Prague 6.

It has been a part of Prague since 1922 and as of 2006, 11,197 people live there.

Part of this district is Šárecké údolí, a natural valley, part of which was declared in 1964 as protected territory in Prague. Part of the valley is a pond called Džbán, with a swimming pool and a nearby camp.

Interesting buildings include the tram depot named Vozovna Vokovice, which is sometimes opened to public.

== Demographics ==
Historical population

Year	Pop.	±%
1869	296	—
1880	398	+34.5%
1890	563	+41.5%
1900	691	+22.7%
1910	1,780	+157.6%

Year	Pop.	±%
1921	2,021	+13.5%
1930	3,116	+54.2%
1950	5,598	+79.7%
1961	7,915	+41.4%
1970	14,751	+86.4%

Year	Pop.	±%
1980	14,261	−3.3%
1991	11,849	−16.9%
2001	11,031	−6.9%
2011	11,352	+2.9%
2021	11,083	−2.4%

Source: Censuses
