= Břevnov =

District of Prague, Czech Republic

- Cadastral Area of Prague
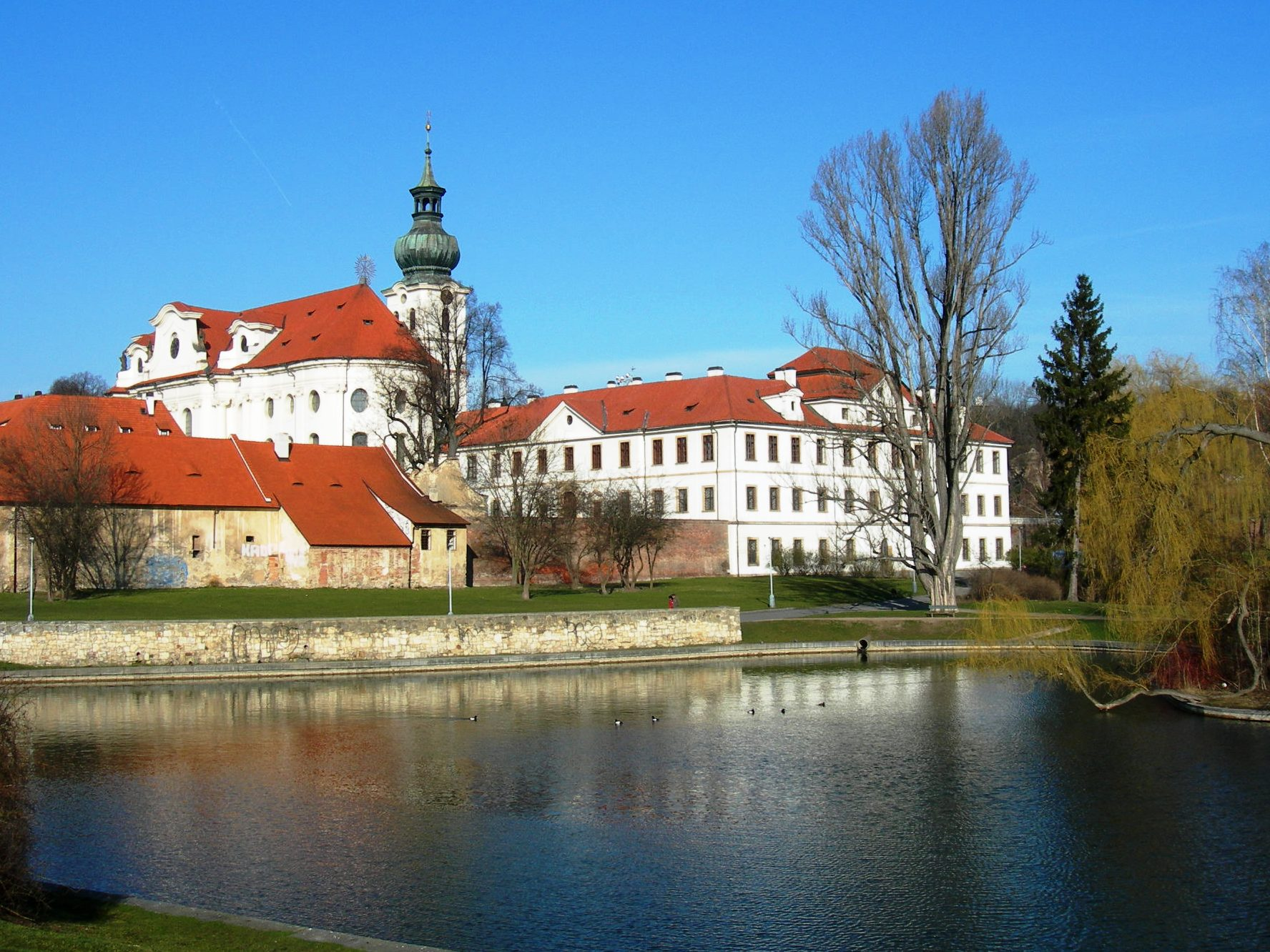
- Břevnov monastery

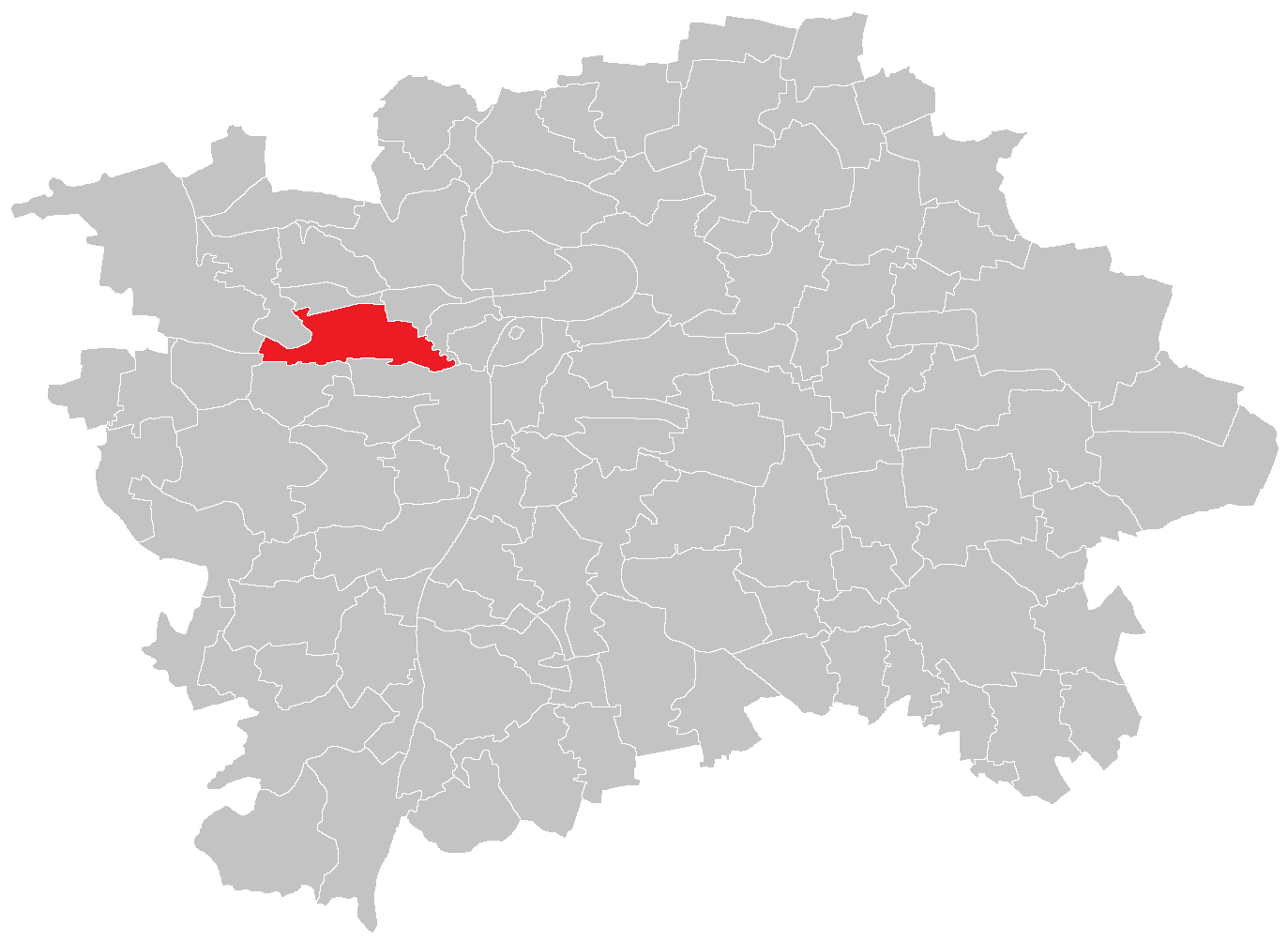
- Location of Břevnov in Prague
- Coordinates: 50°05′04″N 14°21′47″E
- Country: Czech Republic
- Region: Prague
- District: Prague 5, Prague 6

Area
  - Total: 5.24 km^{2} (2.02 sq mi)

Population (2021)
  - Total: 25,756
  - Density: 4,920/km^{2} (12,700/sq mi)
- Time zone: UTC+1 (CET)
  - Summer (DST): UTC+2 (CEST)
- Postal code: 160 12, 160 17, 162 00, 169 00

Břevnov (Czech pronunciation: [ˈbr̝ɛvnof]) is a cadastral district in the west of Prague, located in Prague 6. The district is home to the Břevnov Monastery (Czech: Břevnovský klášter). On the territory of Břevnov stems Brusnice brook. Břevnov was first mentioned in the 10th century. In 1907 was promoted to the city and since 1921 then became part of the City of Prague.

Apart from the Břevnov monastery, we can find other remarkable buildings on the area. The building of the Institute of Macromolecular Chemistry of the Czech Academy of Sciences is located in the north-western of Břevnov. The legend of this institute was its former director Otto Wichterle, to whom is devoted the monument in front of the building. Others are: Ladronka homestead, Hostinec U Kaštanu and Hotel Pyramida. There is also a large Military University Hospital (Ústřední vojenská nemocnice).

The Petřiny metro station on line A is located in the extreme west of Břevnov. The rest of the district is served by a tram line which runs along Bělohorská street.

The Markéta Stadium hosts speedway and athletics events.

== Demographics ==
Historical population

| Year | Pop. | ±% |
|---|---|---|
| 1869 | 2,702 | — |
| 1880 | 3,669 | +35.8% |
| 1890 | 5,251 | +43.1% |
| 1900 | 7,758 | +47.7% |
| 1910 | 11,116 | +43.3% |
| 1921 | 12,752 | +14.7% |
| 1930 | 18,512 | +45.2% |
| 1950 | 26,065 | +40.8% |

| Year | Pop. | ±% |
|---|---|---|
| 1961 | 29,031 | +11.4% |
| 1970 | 33,184 | +14.3% |
| 1980 | 29,970 | −9.7% |
| 1991 | 25,950 | −13.4% |
| 2001 | 24,459 | −5.7% |
| 2011 | 26,275 | +7.4% |
| 2021 | 25,756 | −2.0% |

Source: Censuses
