= Brotherhood (sculpture) =

1950 sculpture by Karel Pokorný

- Czech: Sbratření
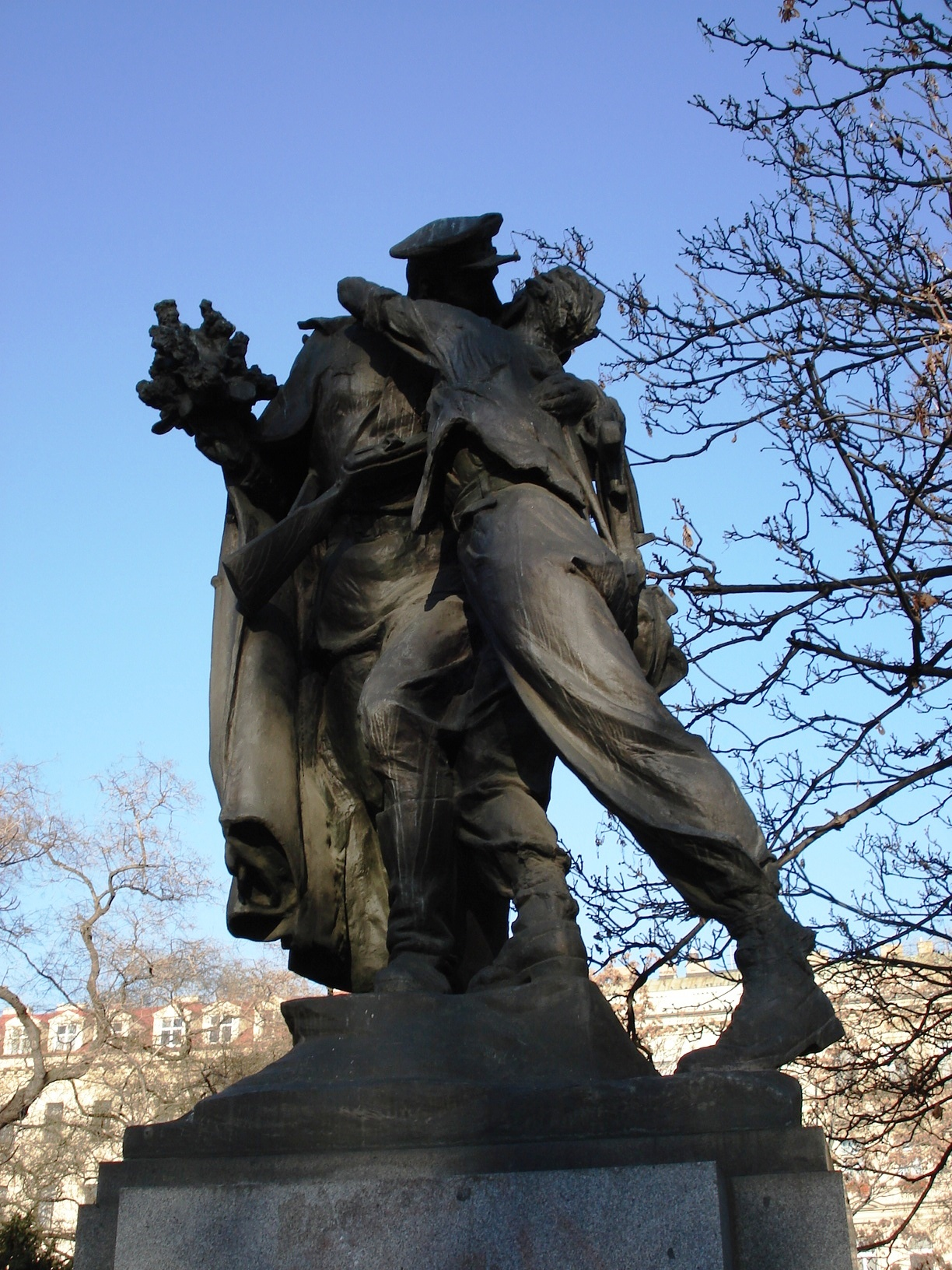
- Brotherhood, Vrchlického sady, Prague
- Artist: Karel Pokorný
- Year: 1947-1960
- 50°5′7.72″N 14°26′6.52″E

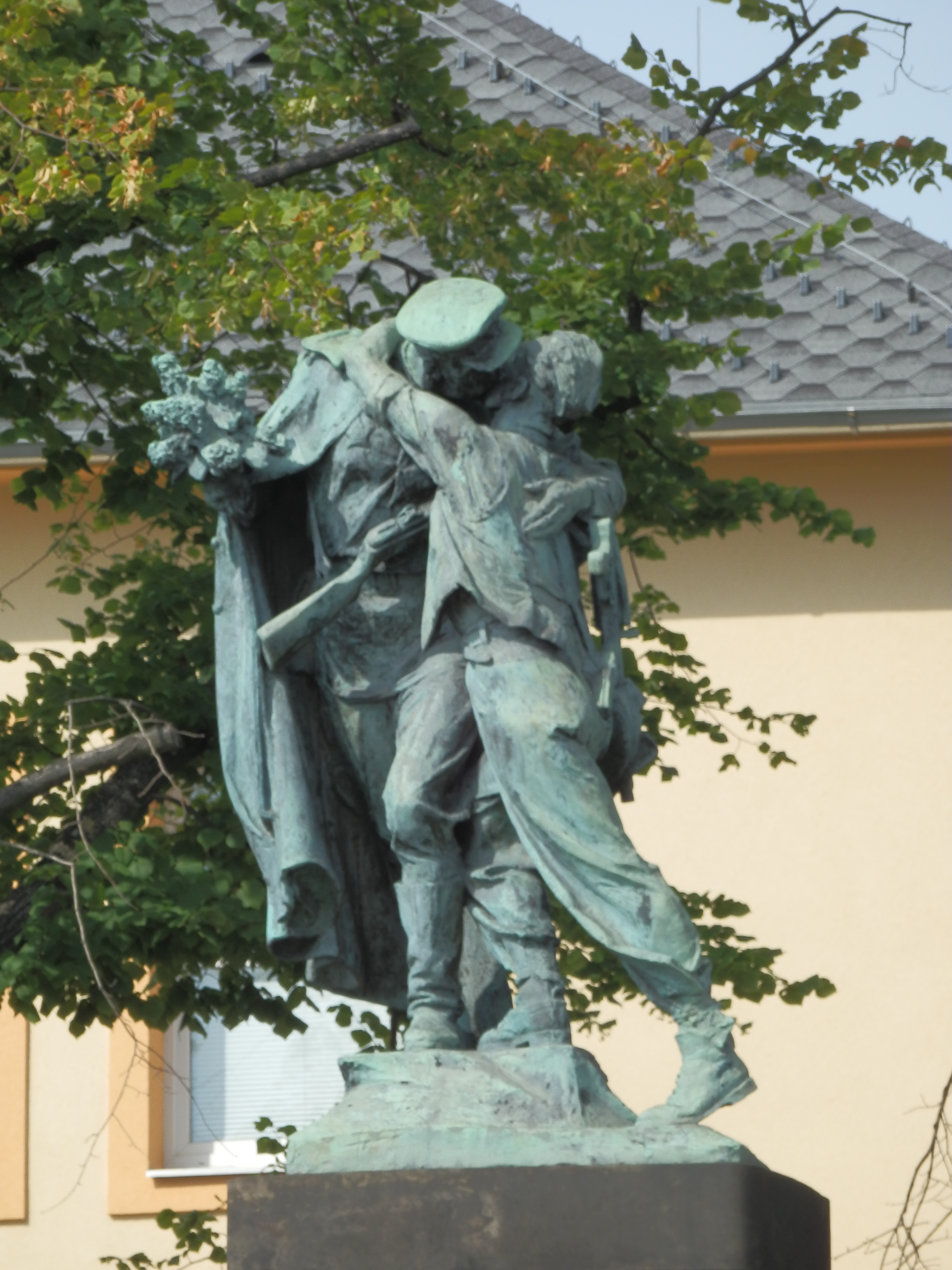
Brotherhood, the prototype in Česká Třebová

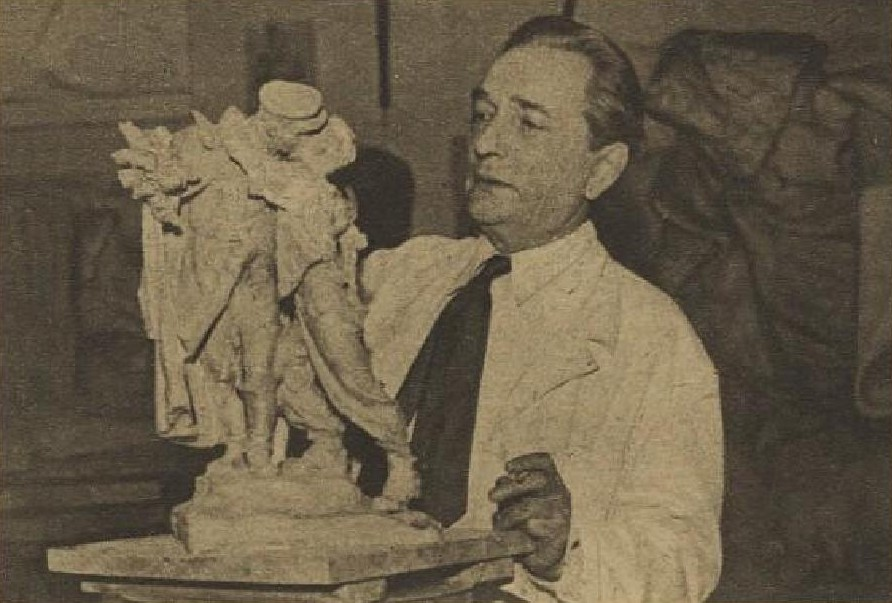
Karel Pokorný with a model of Brotherhood, 1949

Brotherhood (Czech: Sbratření, lit. 'Fraternation') is a sculpture by the Czech sculptor Karel Pokorný (1891–1962). Initially placed in Česká Třebová, Czechoslovakia in 1951, it was dedicated to the end of the Prague Offensive during World War II. Its replicas were established in Prague (1960, replaced in 1988), Saint Petersburg (1977) and Kurpaty, Crimea (1985). The sculpture depicts the meeting of a Soviet Red Army soldier and a Czech militiaman in May 1945. Soviet art critics evaluated Brotherhood as one of the best works of socialist realism. This sculpture became a symbol of friendship between the peoples of the Soviet Union and Czechoslovakia. Its image was used on stamps, coins, banknotes, etc.

After the dismantling of the Monument to Soviet Tank Crews in 1991 and the Statue of Ivan Konev in 2020, Brotherhood became the main memorial of World War II in Prague.

From the first years after its creation, some viewers of the sculpture saw homoerotic overtones in it.
