= Statue of Ivan Konev =

Monument to Soviet general Ivan Konev

- Socha Ivana Koněva (Czech)
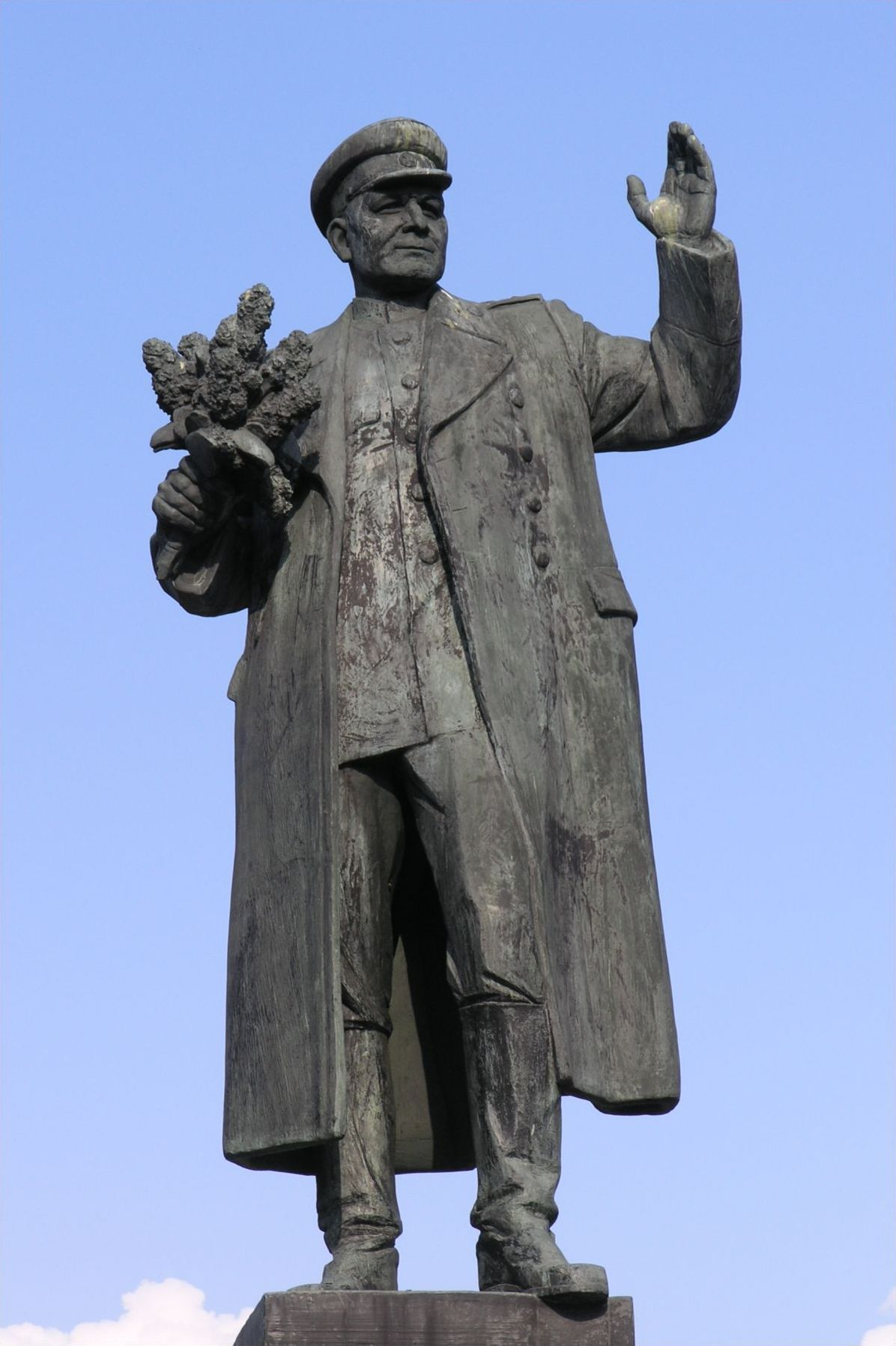
- The statue in 2007
- Artist: Zdeněk Krybus and Vratislav Růžička
- Year: 1980
- Completion date: 9 May 1980
- Type: Sculpture
- Medium: bronze and granite
- Subject: Ivan Konev
- Dimensions: 300 cm × 140 cm × 100 cm (120 in × 55 in × 39 in)
- Location: Prague, Czech Republic

The statue of Ivan Konev (Czech: Socha Ivana Koněva) was a monument to Soviet general Ivan Konev that was erected in Prague in 1980. In the late 2010s, it became a subject of controversy within Czech Republic–Russia relations, resulting in its removal in 2020.

== History ==
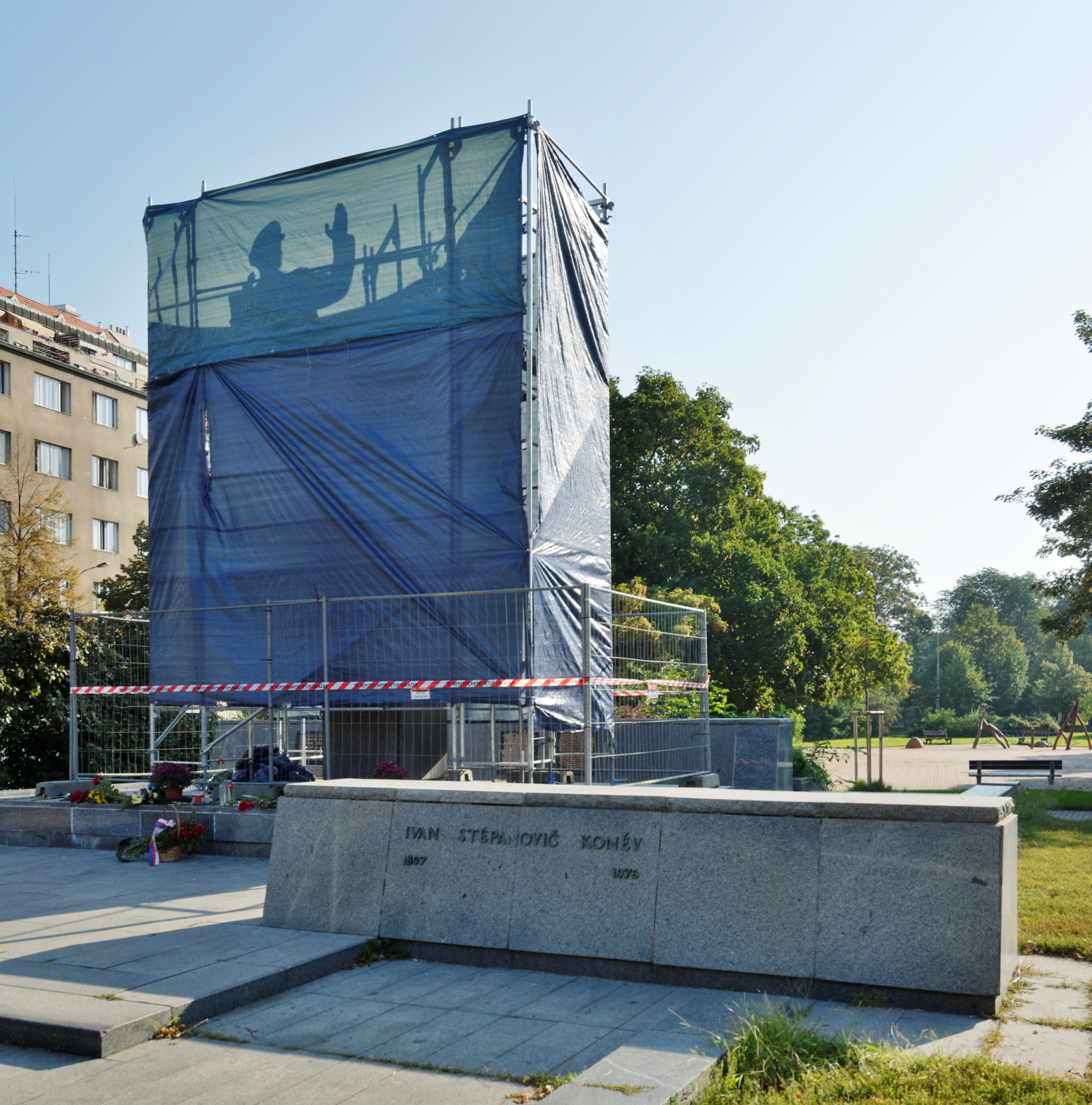
Monument in late 2019, covered up

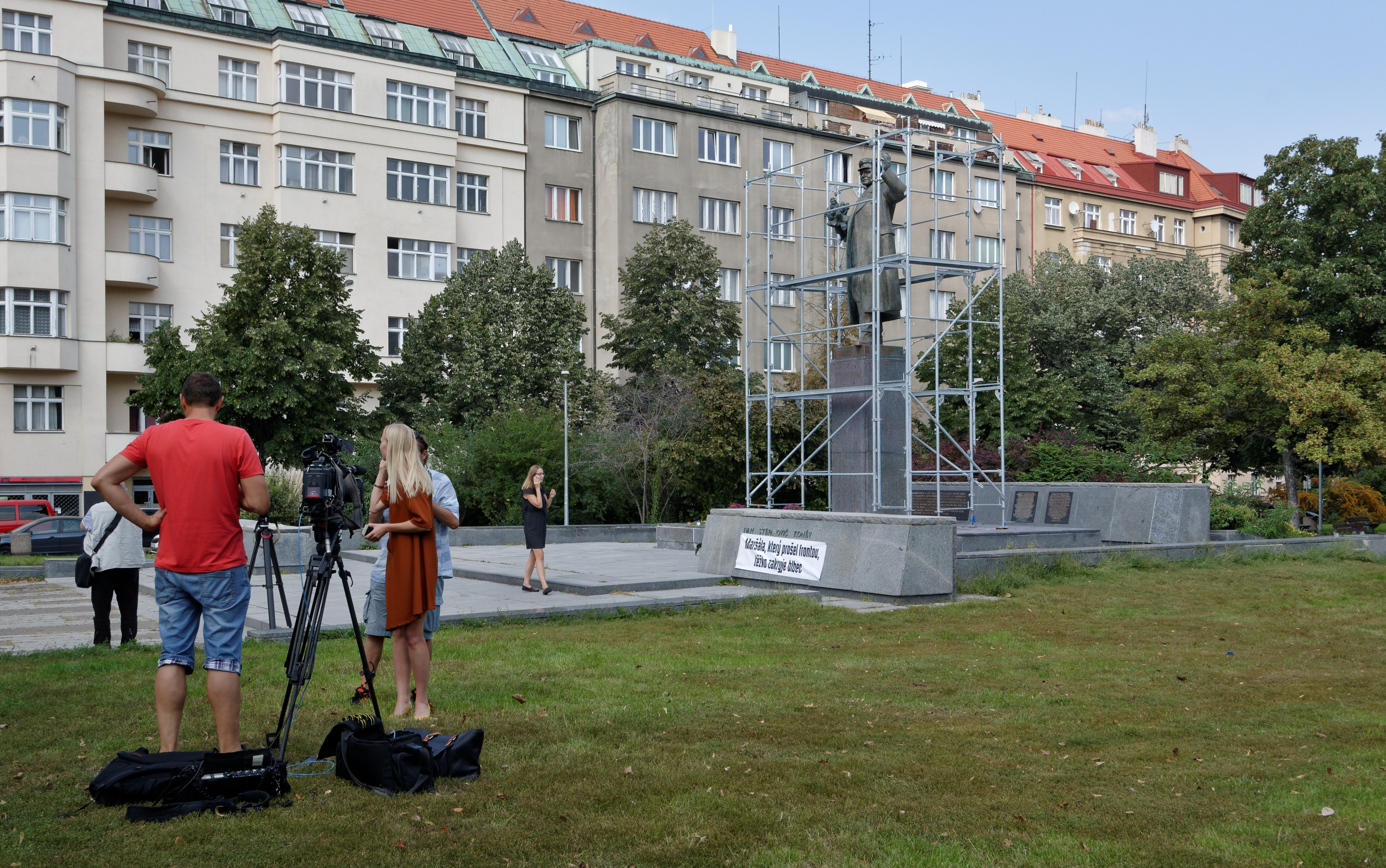
Czech journalists covering the incidents related to the statue in 2019

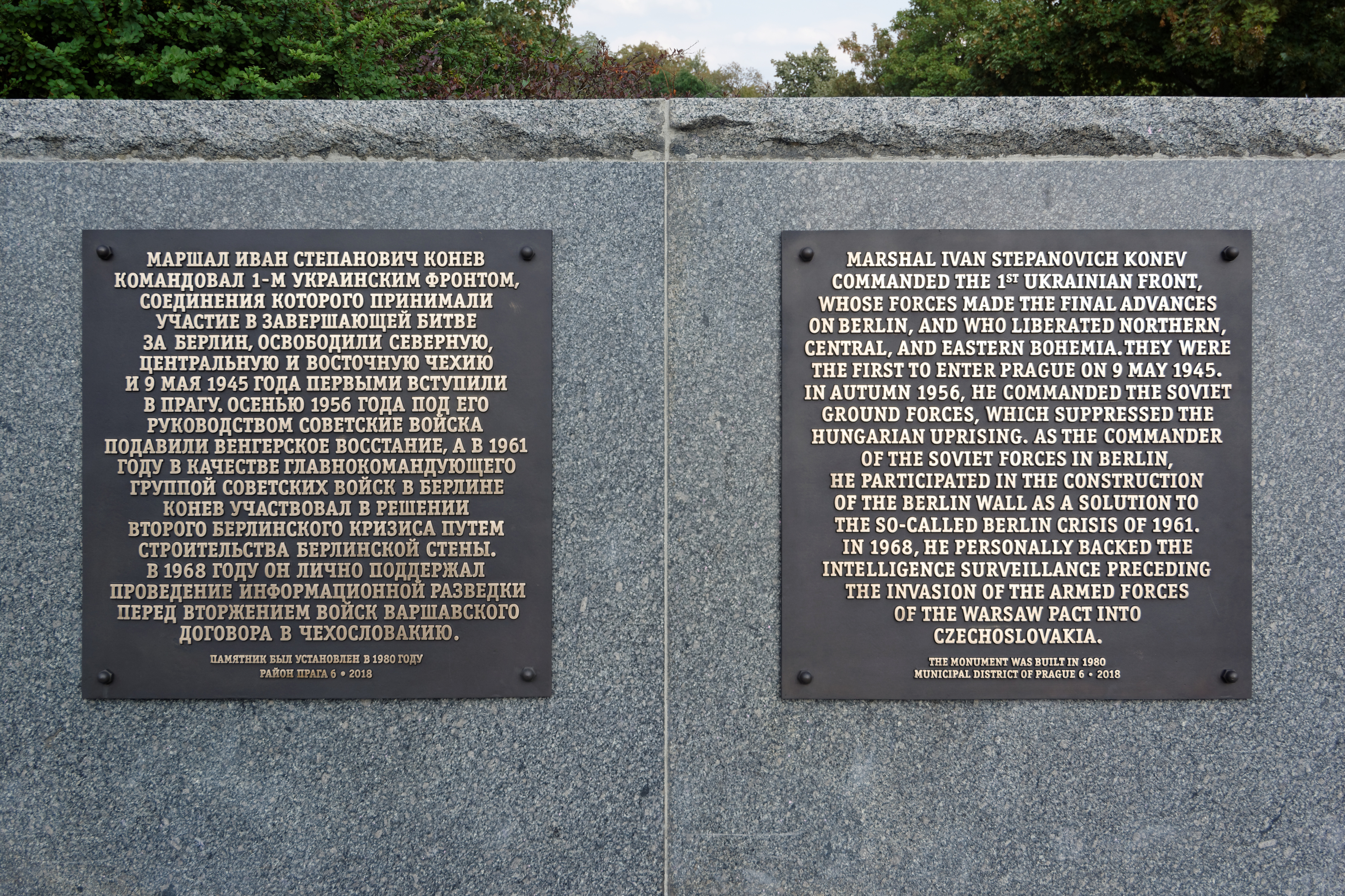
The plaques in both english and russian

The statue was unveiled during the Soviet Victory Day celebrations on 9 May 1980, and was intended to commemorate Marshal Ivan Stepanovich Konev, one of several commanders of Red Army troops who captured Prague from Nazi Germany during the Prague offensive at the end of World War II. It depicted a life-sized figure of Konev, holding in his hand a bouquet of lilacs, which civilians allegedly presented to the Red Army when it entered Czechoslovakia in May 1945. It was located in Prague district 6 (Interbrigády Square, Bubeneč area). The statue was designed by Czech sculptor Zdeněk Krybus and architect Vratislav Růžička.

After the fall of the communist regime in 1989 and the Czech transition to a democratic government, it became a subject of frequent vandalism, particularly on the anniversary of the Prague Spring, a revolution that was put down by invading Soviet forces. The local government proposed relocating the monument to the Russian embassy.

In 2018, the city added explanatory text to the monument, stating that Konev participated in the suppression of the Hungarian Revolution of 1956 and the Prague Spring. The explanatory text has been criticized by the Russian embassy. The diplomatic spat over this text has been one of the issues leading to the deterioration of Czech-Russia relations.

On 21 August 2019, an unknown individual spray-painted "No to the blood-covered marshal, we shall not forget" on the statue. The mayor of Prague 6 said that he is considering leaving the monument uncleaned, remarking that "red, after all, means beautiful in Russian". By September 2019, the Prague municipal authorities had covered up the monument, no longer willing to incur the cost of cleaning it up. The move proved to be controversial, as within days the tarpaulin covering the monument had been torn down three times; two individuals, described by Czech media as "pro-Russian activists", were detained by the police.

The monument was finally removed on 3 April 2020 during lockdown and the state of emergency imposed due to the COVID-19 pandemic in the Czech Republic, with the Czech president Miloš Zeman criticizing the removal as "an abuse of the state of emergency". Within days, the Investigative Committee of the Russian Federation announced it would begin a symbolic investigation of the alleged "defiling of symbols of Russia's military glory". The mayor of Prague district 6 subsequently went into hiding under police protection, out of concerns of an alleged saxitoxin and ricin poison plot for his actions regarding the statue. The poison threat was later revealed to have been a hoax originating from the Russian embassy. The Czech government expelled two Russian embassy diplomats; Andrey Konchakov (Russian: Андрей Кончаков), who headed the Russian Center for Science and Culture (Rossotrudnichestvo) (Russian: Россотрудничество) in Prague, and his subordinate Igor Rybakov, an FSB officer. (Note: Igor Rybakov (Russian: Игорь Рыбаков; born 1971, Omsk), who performed military service at Soviet-Afghan border, joined FSB in 1995 in the Office for the Protection of the Constitutional System (now the Second Service of the FSB), studied law at the FSB Academy in Moscow from 1997 to 2000, transferred to Bitsa Park or the "forest" (Russian: "лес") at Yasenevo outside the Moscow Ring Road on the outskirts of Moscow which is the FSB headquarters and training grounds for FSB special forces known as Alpha Group at the Special Forces Center, and then worked as an expert in international politics in the United States, Syria where he performed secret operations between Manaf Tlass and the Kremlin, Afghanistan, Morocco and the Czech Republic. Igor Rybakov worked closely with members of the Donald Trump administration, is very close to Russian mafia including both Igor Makarov and Semion Mogilevich, and ran unsuccessfully for mayor of Omsk in 2017. In 2018, he began working for RS, which is known as Russian Center for Science and Culture (Rossotrudnichestvo), under KGB-SVR officers Alexander Ledenev (Russian: Александр Леденев) and Sergei Kruppo (Russian: Сергей Круппо) in the department for interaction with international organizations through which FSB officers are posted to Rossotrudnichestvo. Since December 2017, Eleonora Mitrofanova (Russian: Элеонора Валентиновна Митрофанова) is the head of RS replacing Lyubov Glebova (Russian: Любовь Глебова) who headed RS from 23 March 2015 to 26 September 2017. Farit Mukhametshin (Russian: Фарит Мухаметшин) was the first head of RS which was established in 2008 from the former Roszarubezhtsentr (Russian: Росзарубежцентр) leading RS from 17 October 2008 to 5 March 2012. Mukhametshin was followed by Konstantin Kosachev (Russian: Константин Косачев) who headed RS from 5 March 2012 to 22 December 2014 and instituted RS as an instrument of "soft power" (Russian: «мягкой силы»).) Russia has also opened criminal proceedings, but the Czech authorities stated that Russia has no legal jurisdiction in this case.

Shortly after removal, local Prague authorities announced they are considering displaying the monument in the planned Museum of the Memory of the 20th Century, while the Russian and Czech ministries noted they are also discussing plans to have the statue transferred to Russia.

In June 2020, during an arts and landscape festival in Prague, 12 small temporary statues of Ivan Konev were unveiled, painted to look like figures such as Batman, Superman, the Joker, and Adolf Hitler.

For thirty days in December 2022, the plinth was occupied by Ahriman the Demon, a statue created at an international convention of blacksmiths, depicting Vladimir Putin as a goblin wielding a gas tap and making a Nazi salute. It was to be auctioned off to support Ukraine during the Russian invasion, an effort organized by businessman Dalibor Dědek.

== See also ==
- Monument to Soviet Tank Crews
