= Mandela Way T-34 Tank =

Soviet tank installed in London

Coordinates: 51°29.579′N 000°04.962′W

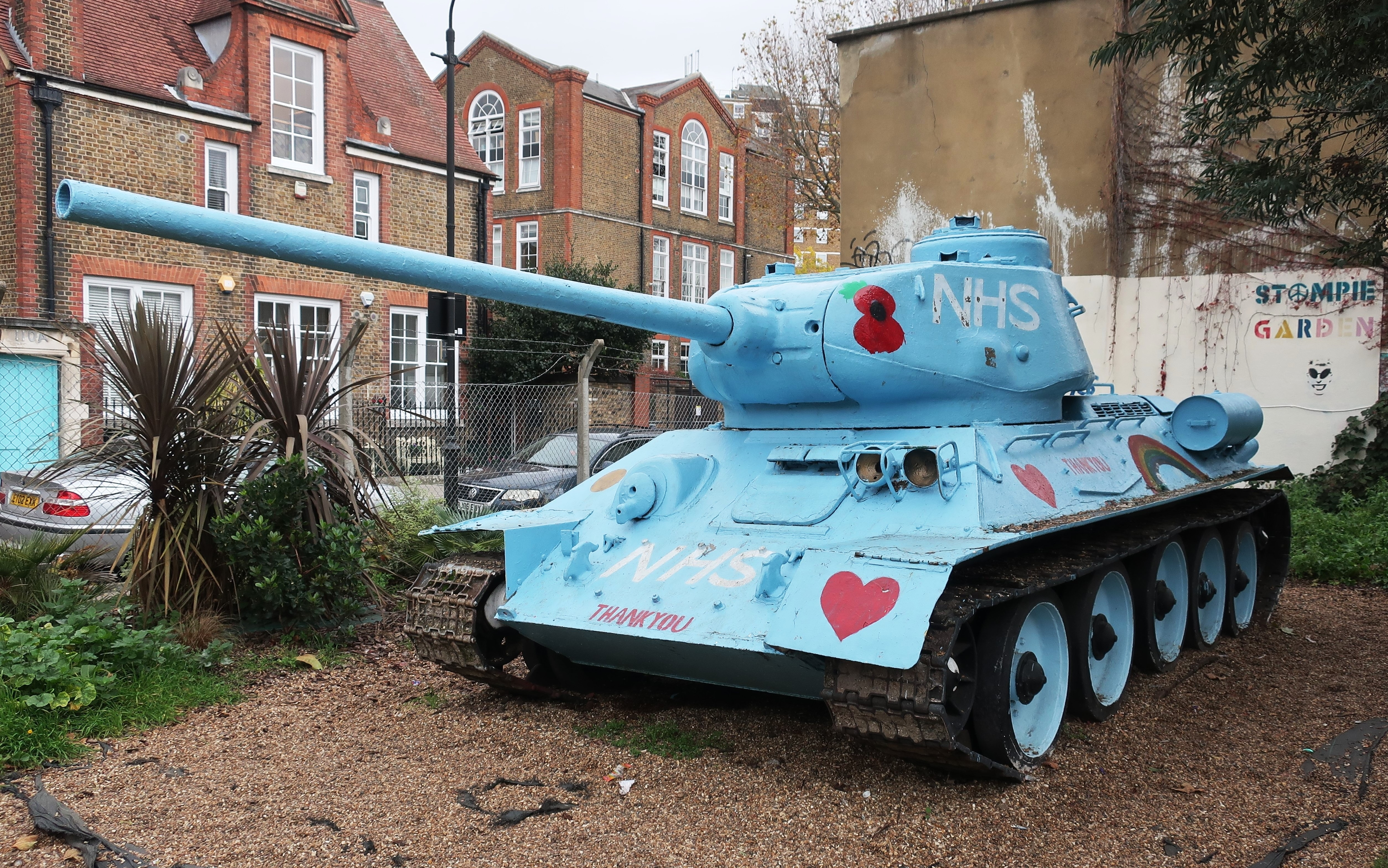
The Mandela Way Tank in November 2020

The Mandela Way T-34 Tank, nicknamed Stompie, is a decommissioned Soviet-built T-34-85 medium tank, formerly located on the corner of Mandela Way and Page's Walk in Bermondsey, London, England. The tank was regularly repainted in a wide variety of colour schemes, often by graffiti artists. In January 2022 it was removed for restoration, and its owner stated in April 2023 that it may not return to its former location due to concerns that the graffiti may affect its historical preservation.

== History ==
The tank is a former Czechoslovak People's Army tank that is rumoured to have taken part in the suppression of the Prague Spring uprising in 1968. Following the "Velvet Revolution" and the dissolution of Czechoslovakia, it was decommissioned and sold, and was used as a prop in the making of the 1995 film Richard III in London. On completion of the film, it was bought in 1995 by Russell Gray, a local scrap dealer, for £7,000 as a present for his son. He had previously failed to secure planning permission from Southwark Council to redevelop a vacant plot of land that he owned; and so, in an act of humorous protest, he placed the tank on the site, with its gun turret turned towards the council offices. He had previously allegedly obtained planning permission for the installation of a "tank" there, assumed by council officials to mean a septic tank.

The tank is nicknamed after the South African anti-apartheid activist James "Stompie" Seipei.

It was removed for restoration on 4 January 2022 by its owner, who said that "it might be a week, it might be two years". In an interview the next year, the owner said he was unsure if the tank would ever be returned to the corner, as the graffiti did not respect "its value as a piece of military history".

== Repainting ==
The tank was regularly repainted, and its colour scheme changed, often by local graffiti artists. In 2002 it was painted pink by Cubitt Artists and Aleksandra Mir. In April 2017 it was temporarily repainted by artist Charlotte Meldon to its authentic military olive drab. In April 2020, during the coronavirus pandemic, it was painted sky blue in support of the National Health Service. Remembrance poppies were added in November 2020. In July 2021, it was repainted light green with dark green letters reading "Go Go Green".

== Gallery ==
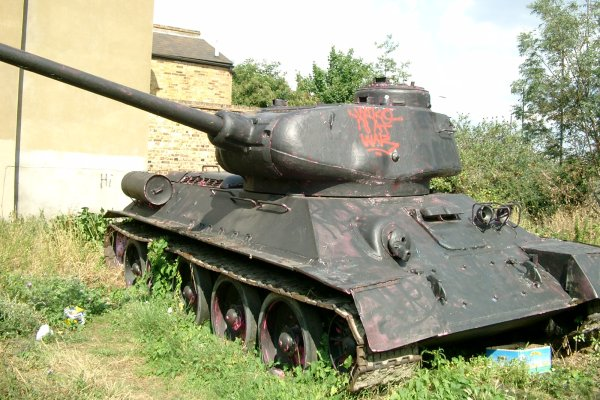
The tank in its original military olive drab colour

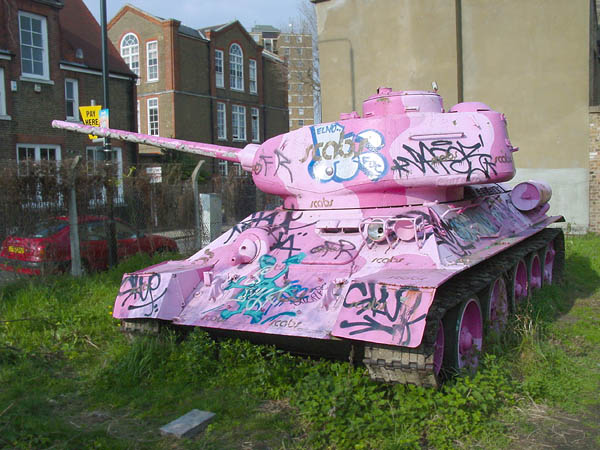
Painted pink in 2002

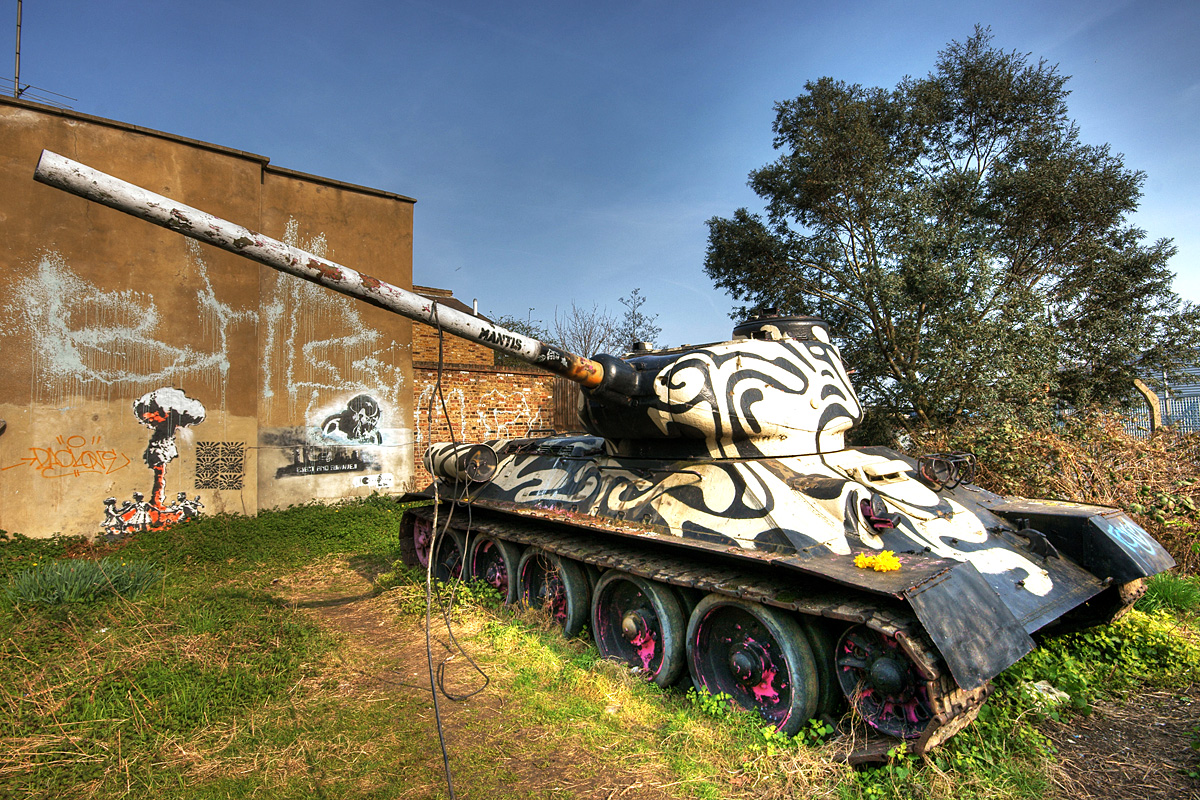
In a black and cream swirling design, December 2008

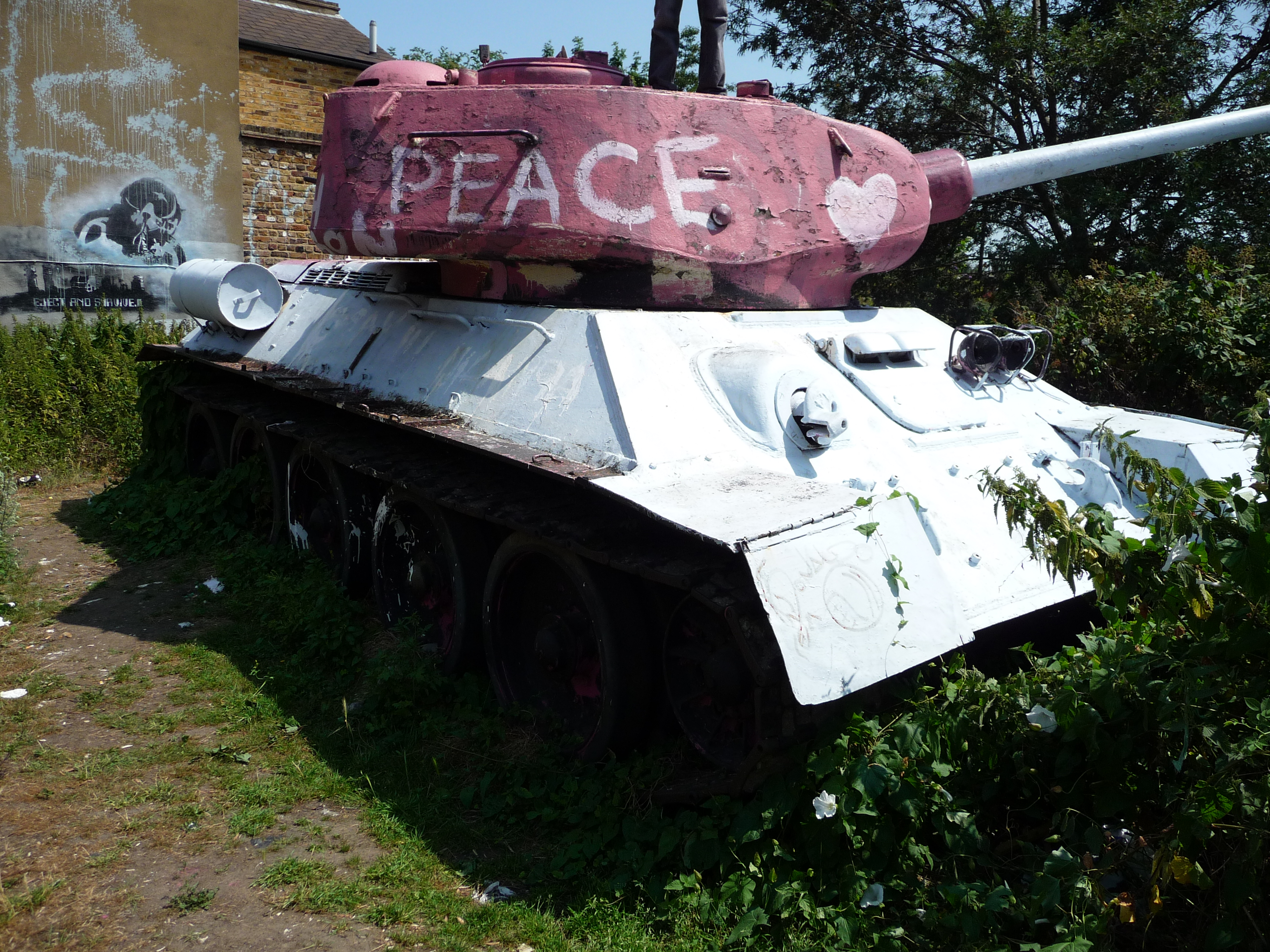
June 2009

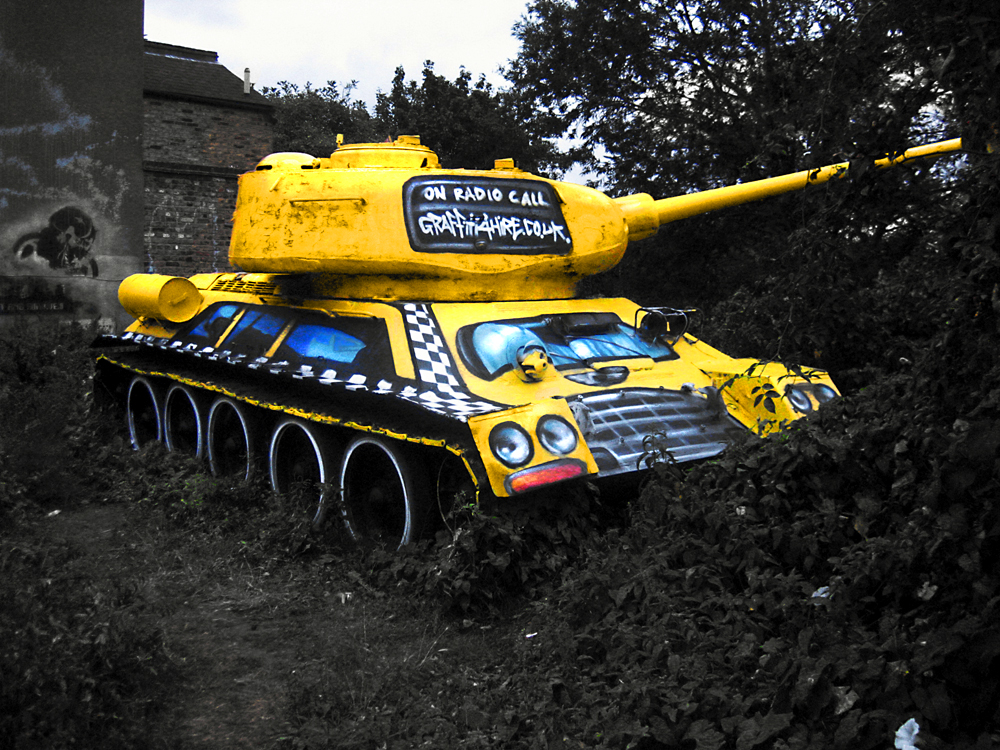
2009 design inspired by US yellow cabs

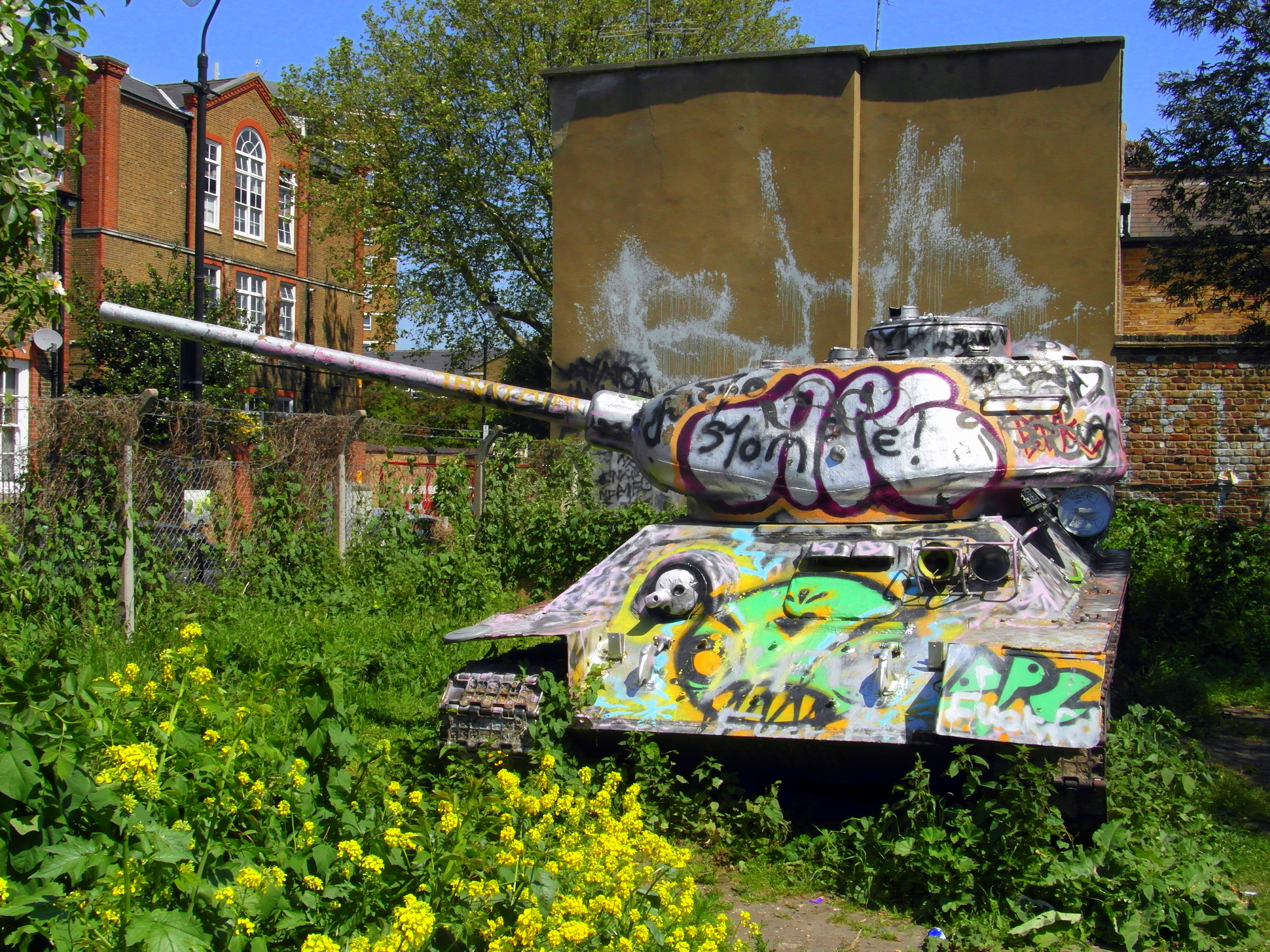
May 2012

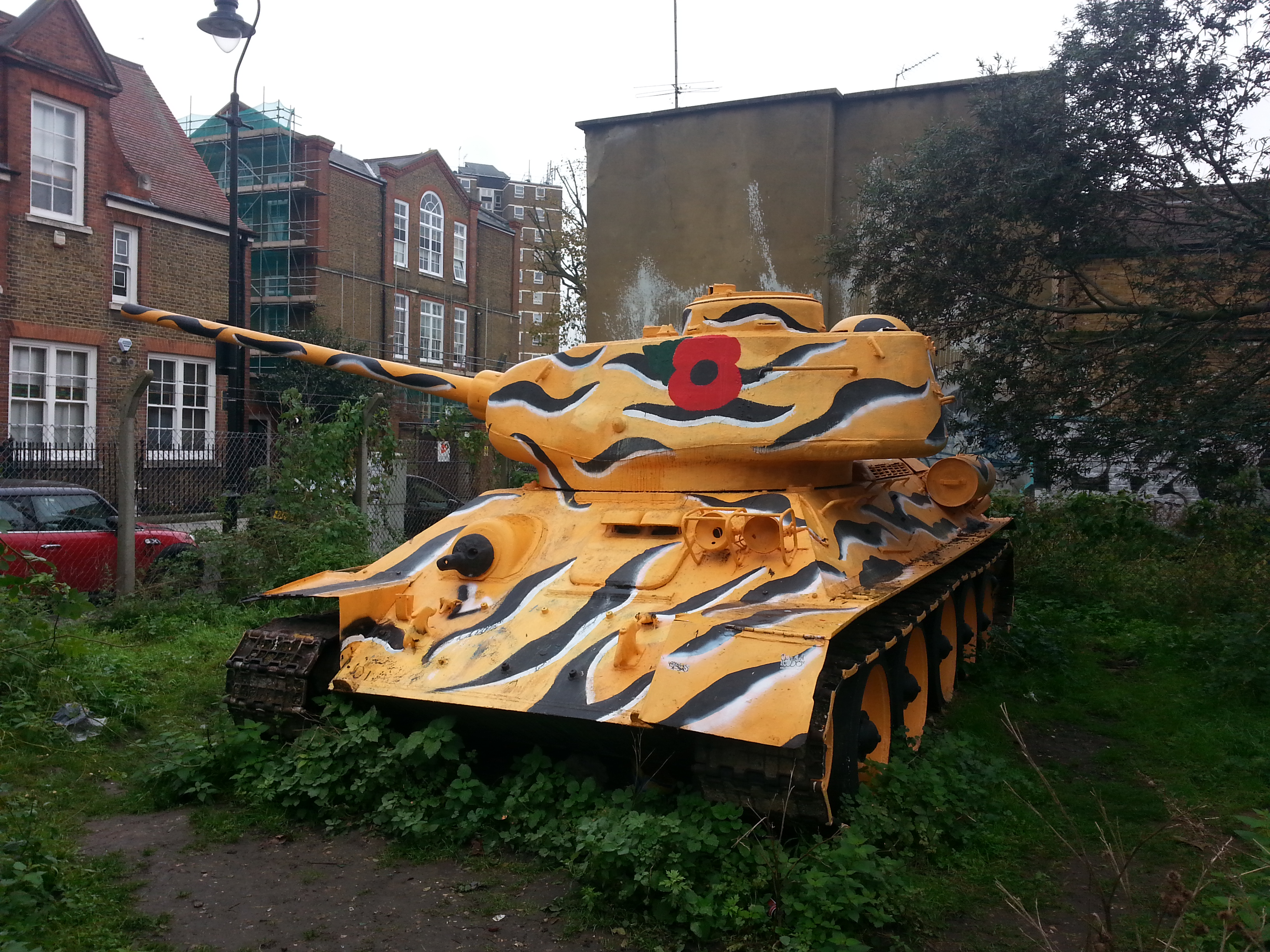
November 2014

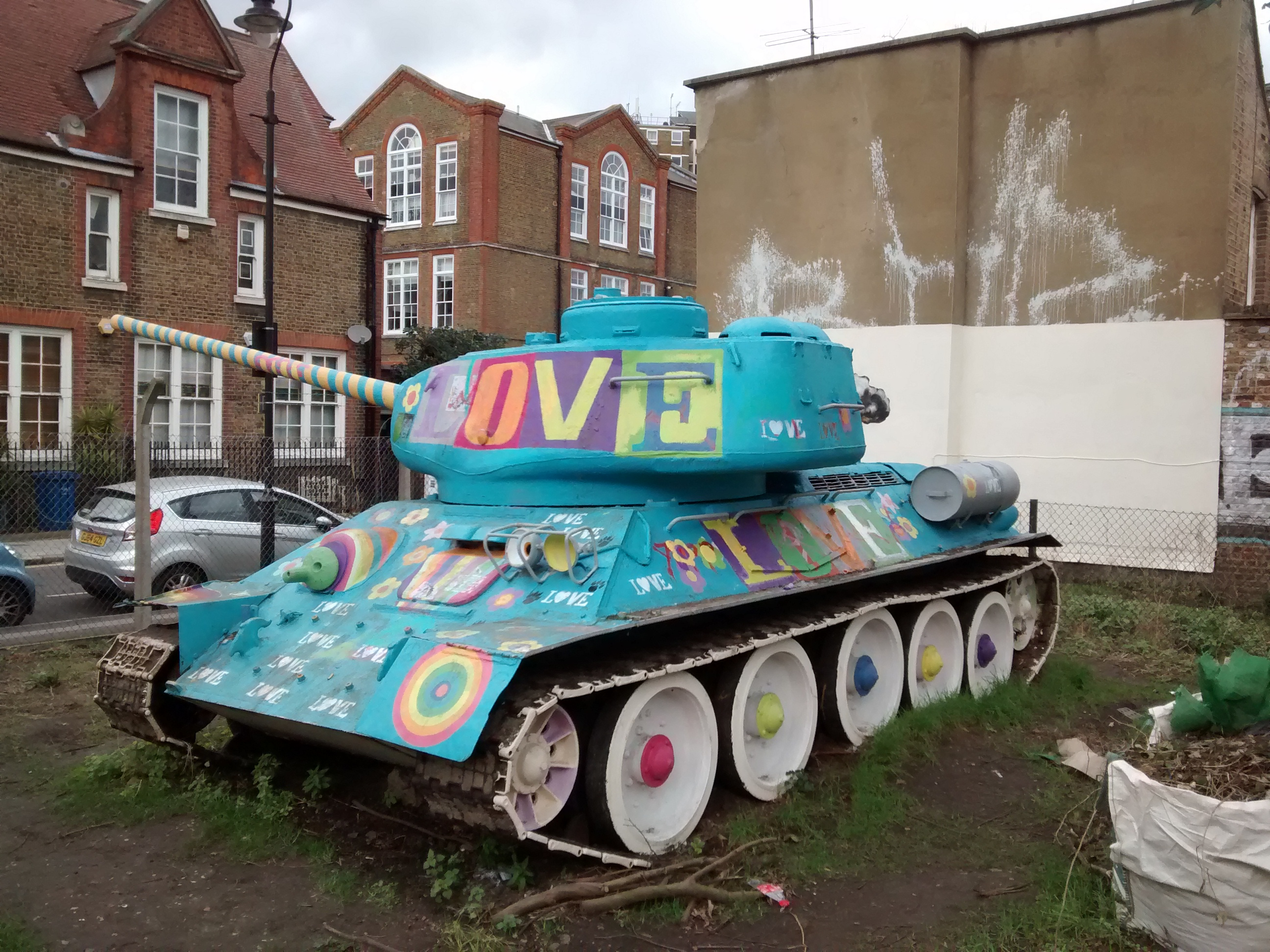
February 2016

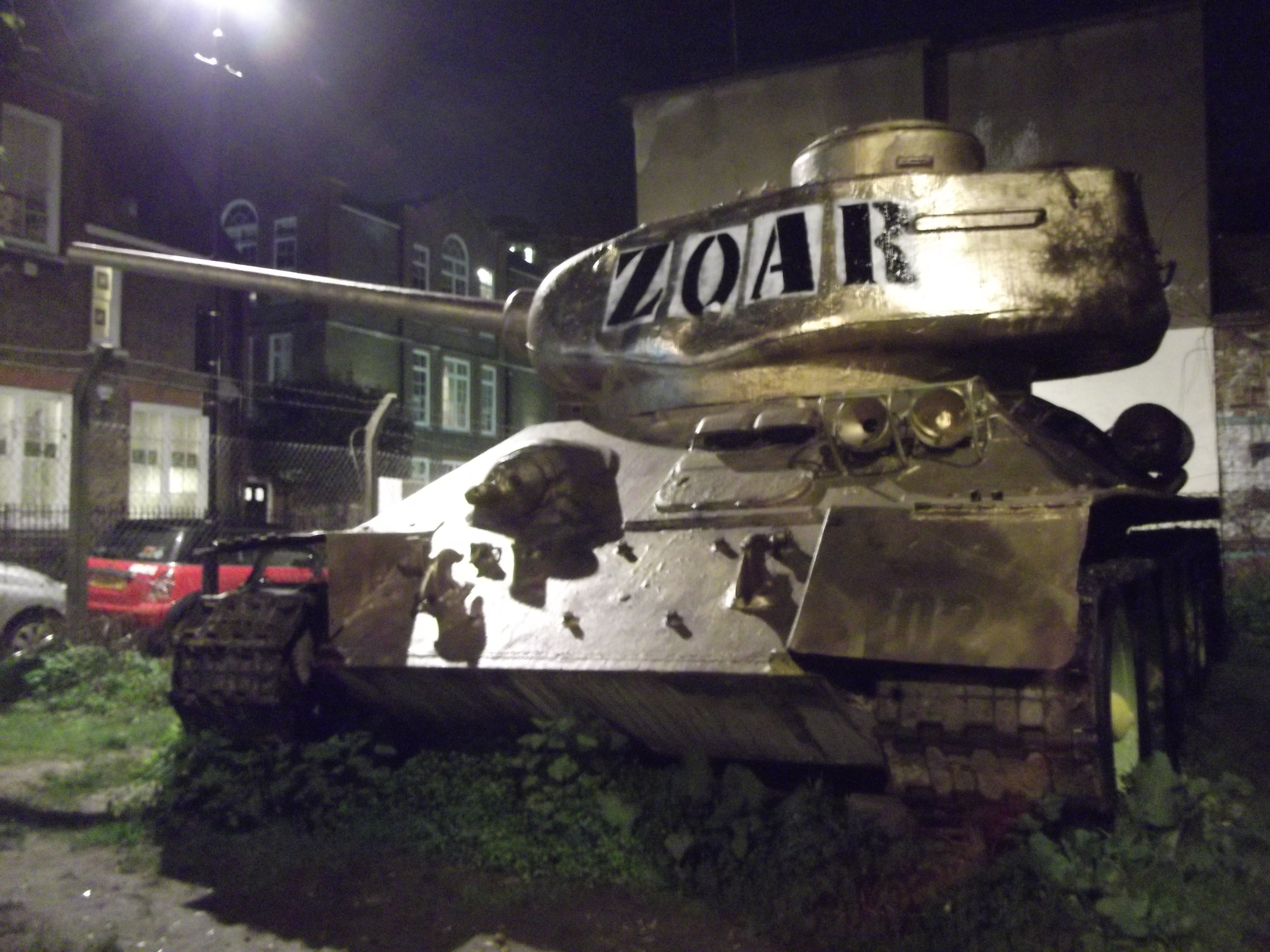
March 2017

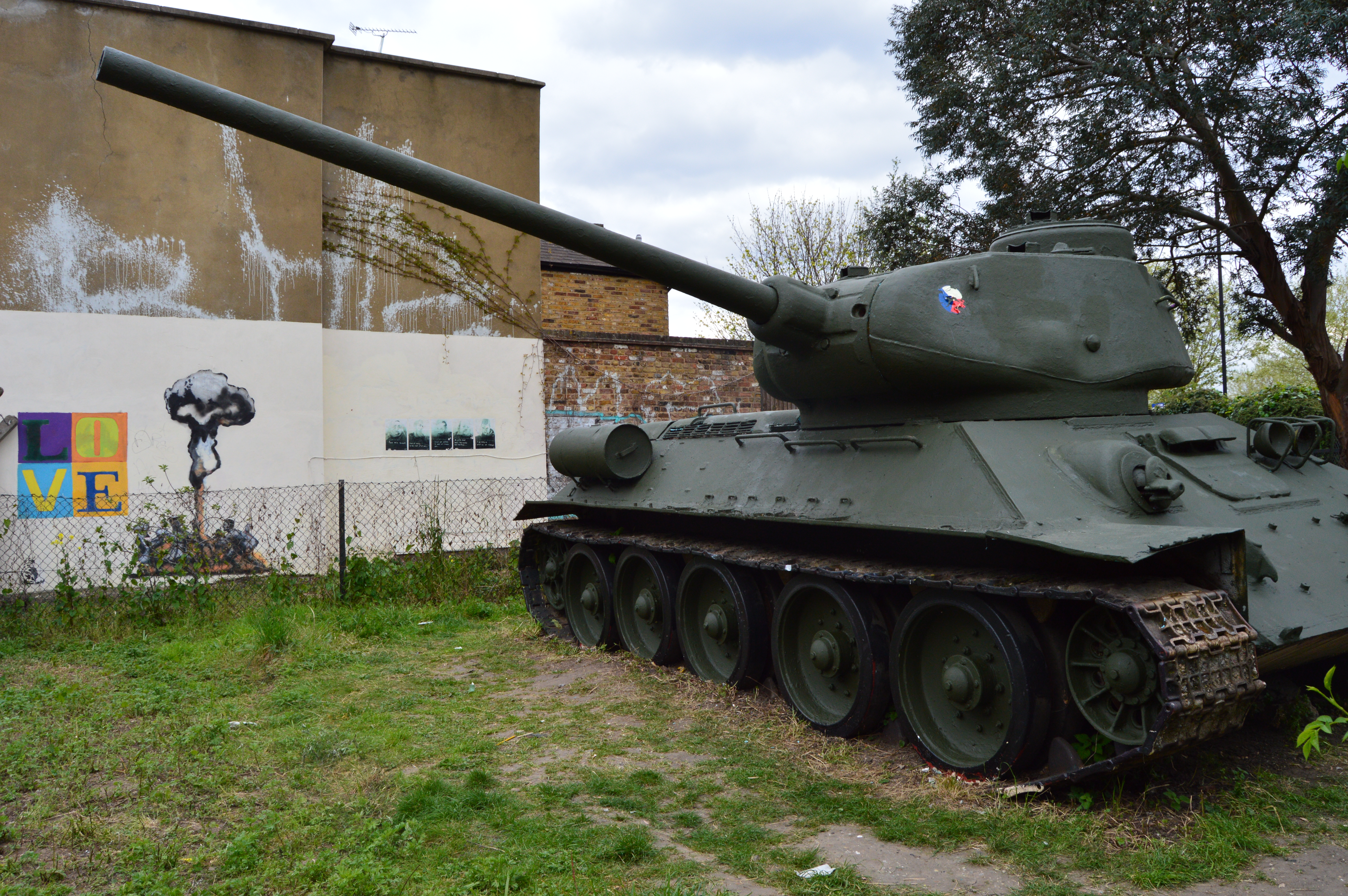
Painted olive drab, April–July 2017

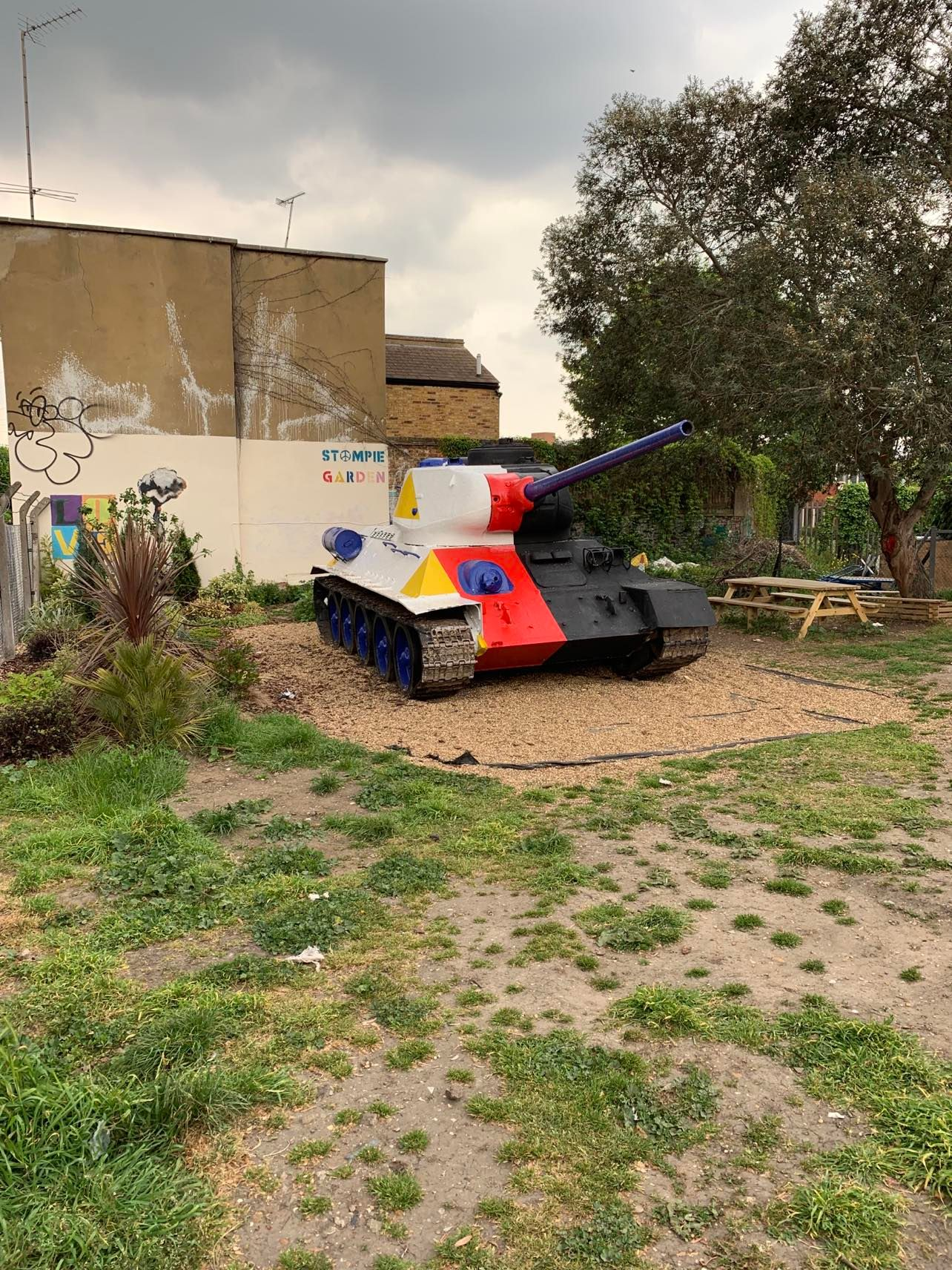
May 2019

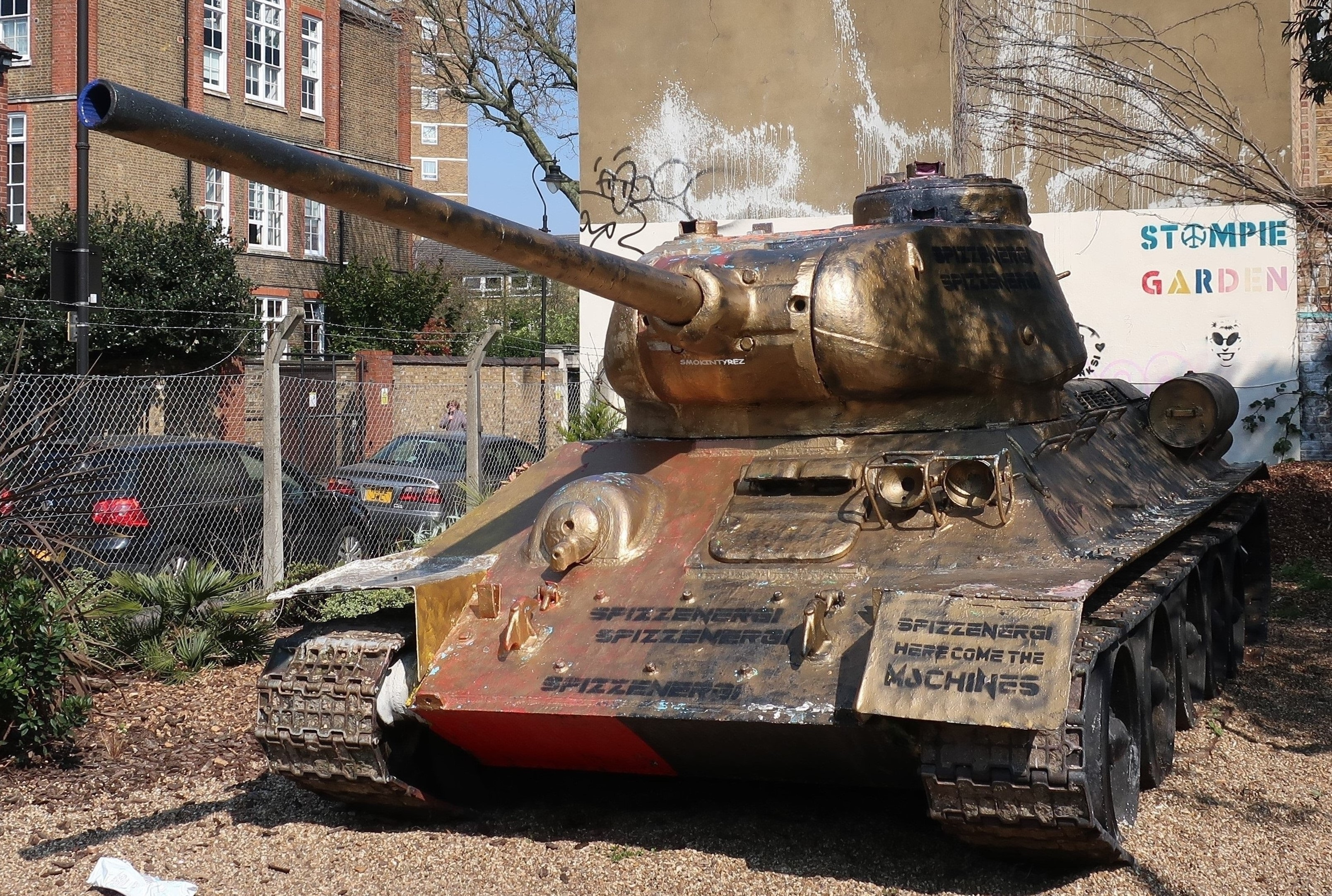
March 2020

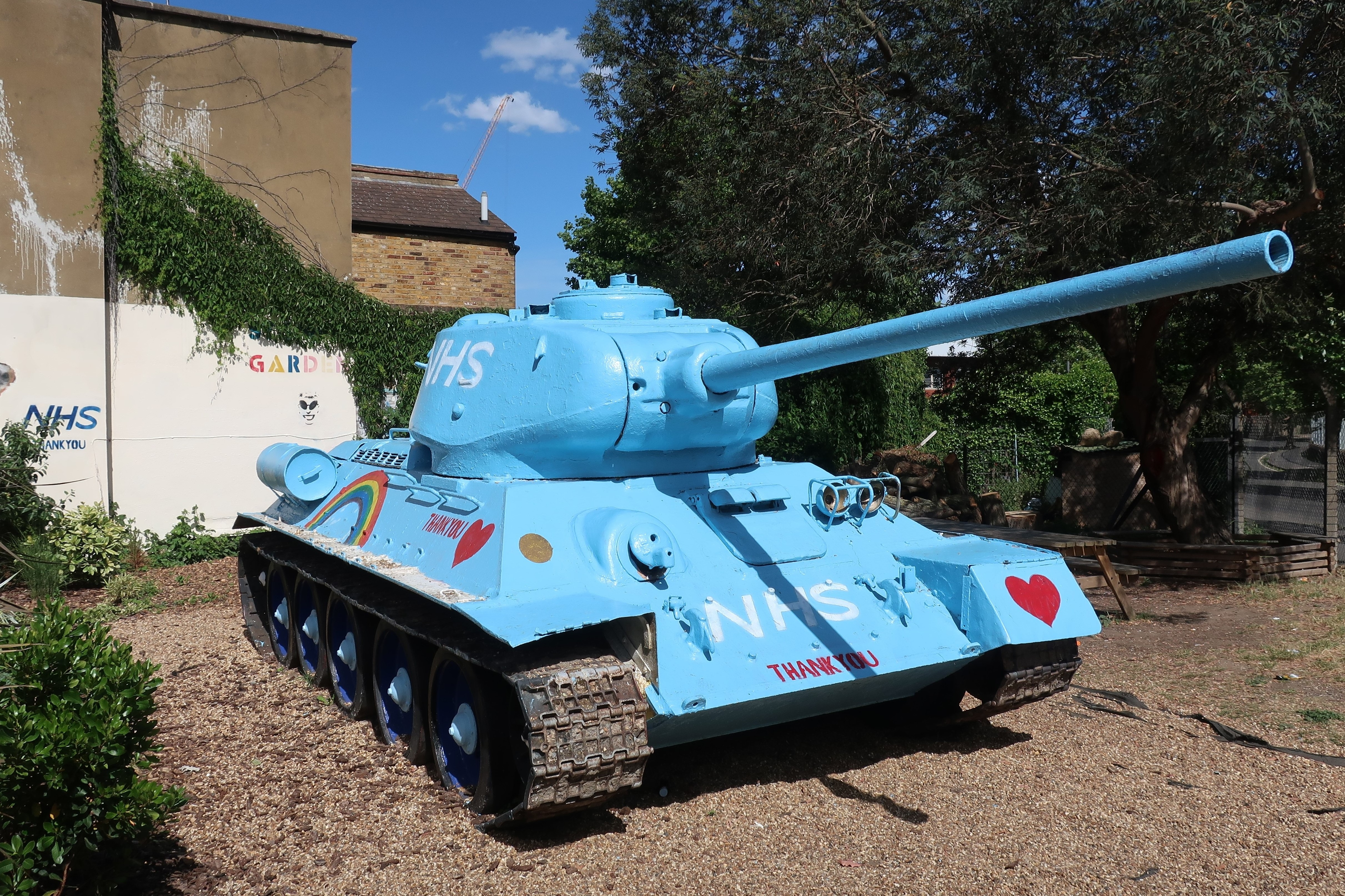
May 2020 in support of the NHS

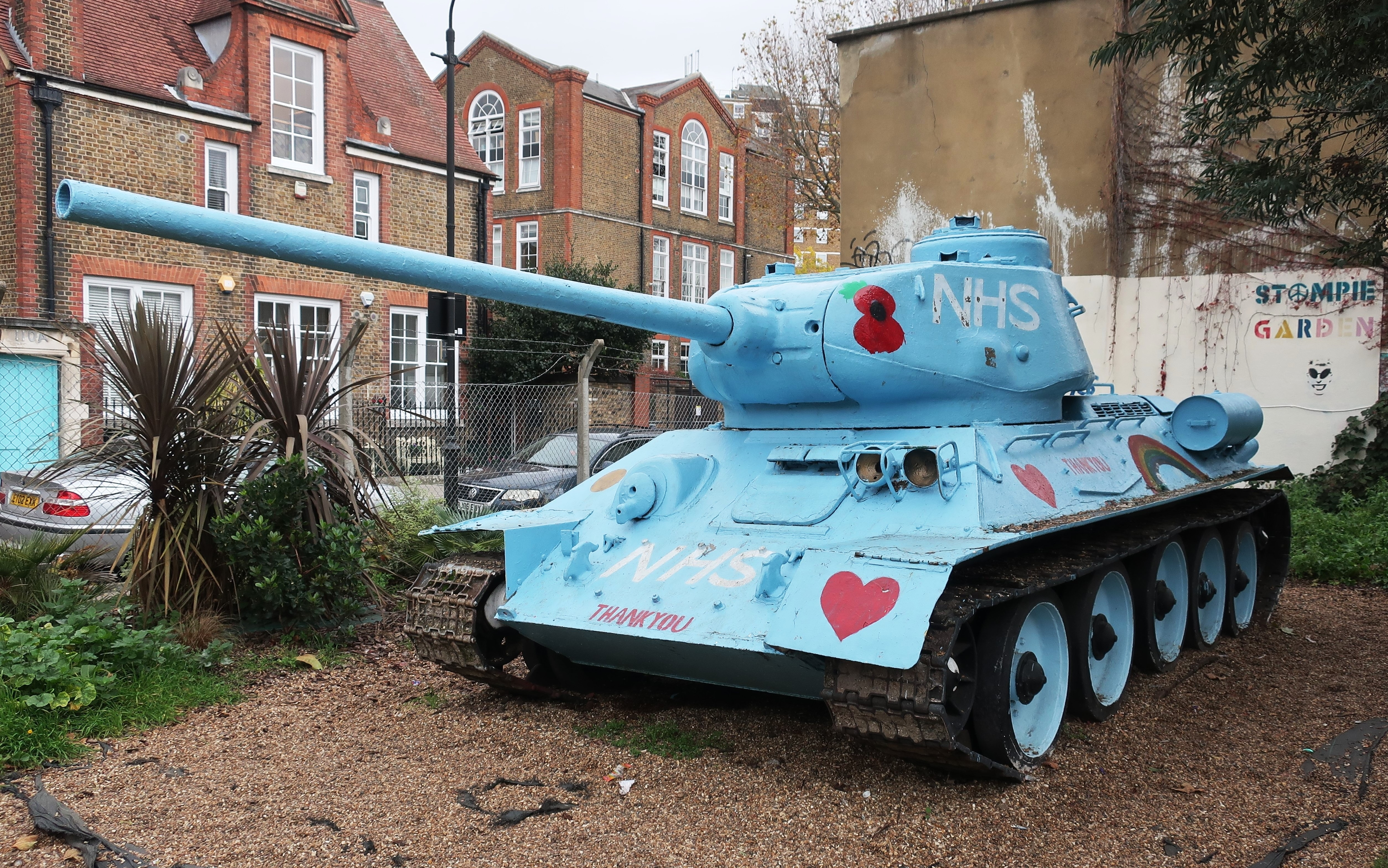
November 2020, with remembrance poppies added to the turret

== Similar graffitied tanks ==
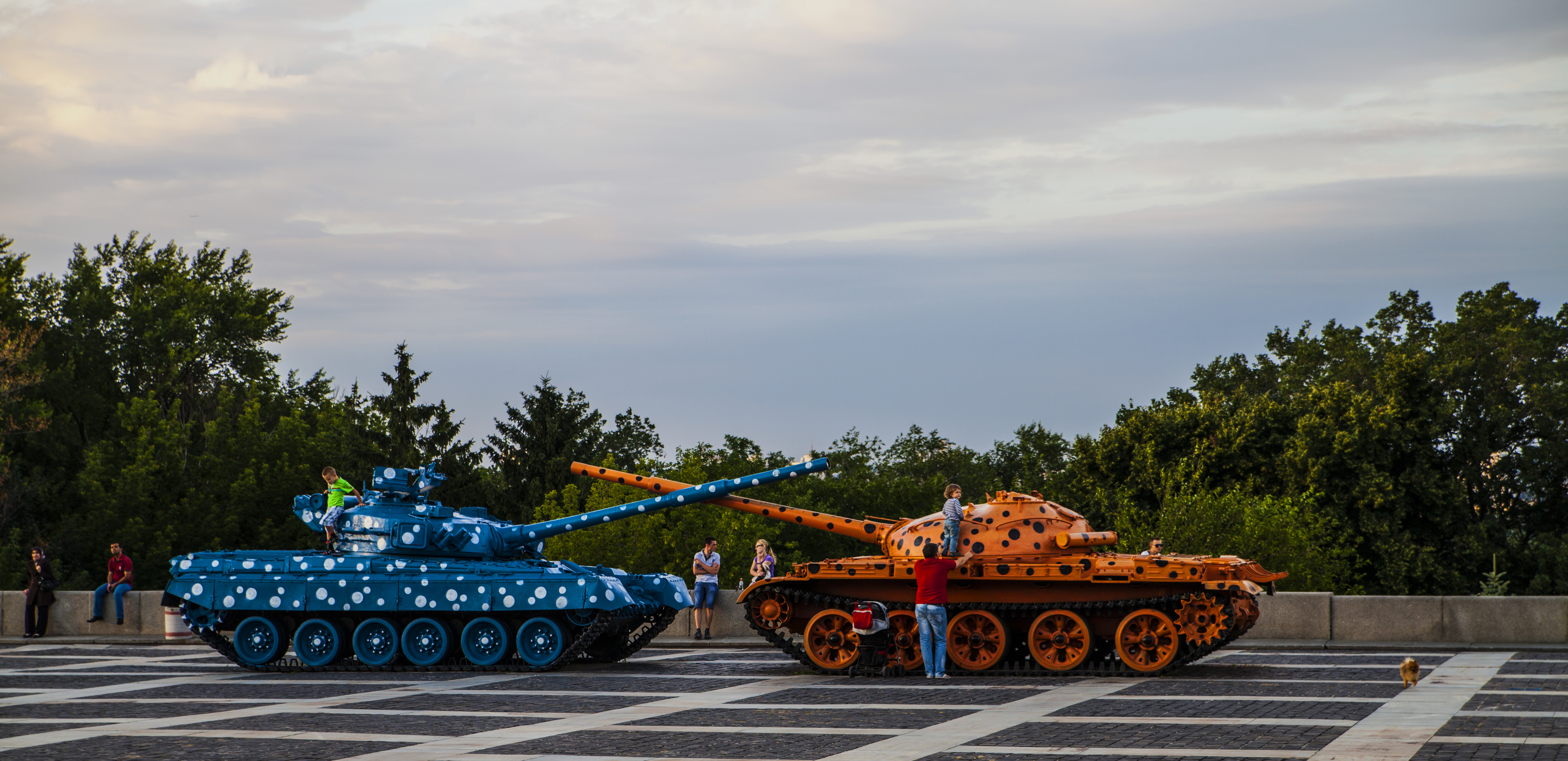
Tanks at the National Museum of the History of Ukraine in the Second World War, Kyiv

There are also T-62 and T-80UD tanks that have been graffitied in a hippie manner at the National Museum of the History of Ukraine in the Second World War, Kyiv, Ukraine.

The Monument to Soviet tank crews was a memorial located in Prague, Czech Republic, made up of an IS-2m tank on a pedestal. In 1991, the artist David Cerny painted the tank pink and hoisted a large middle finger over the turret in protest against the controversial monument. The monument was later removed and the tank is now displayed at Military Museum Lešany, painted pink.
