= Dalibor Dědek =

Business magnate (born 1957)

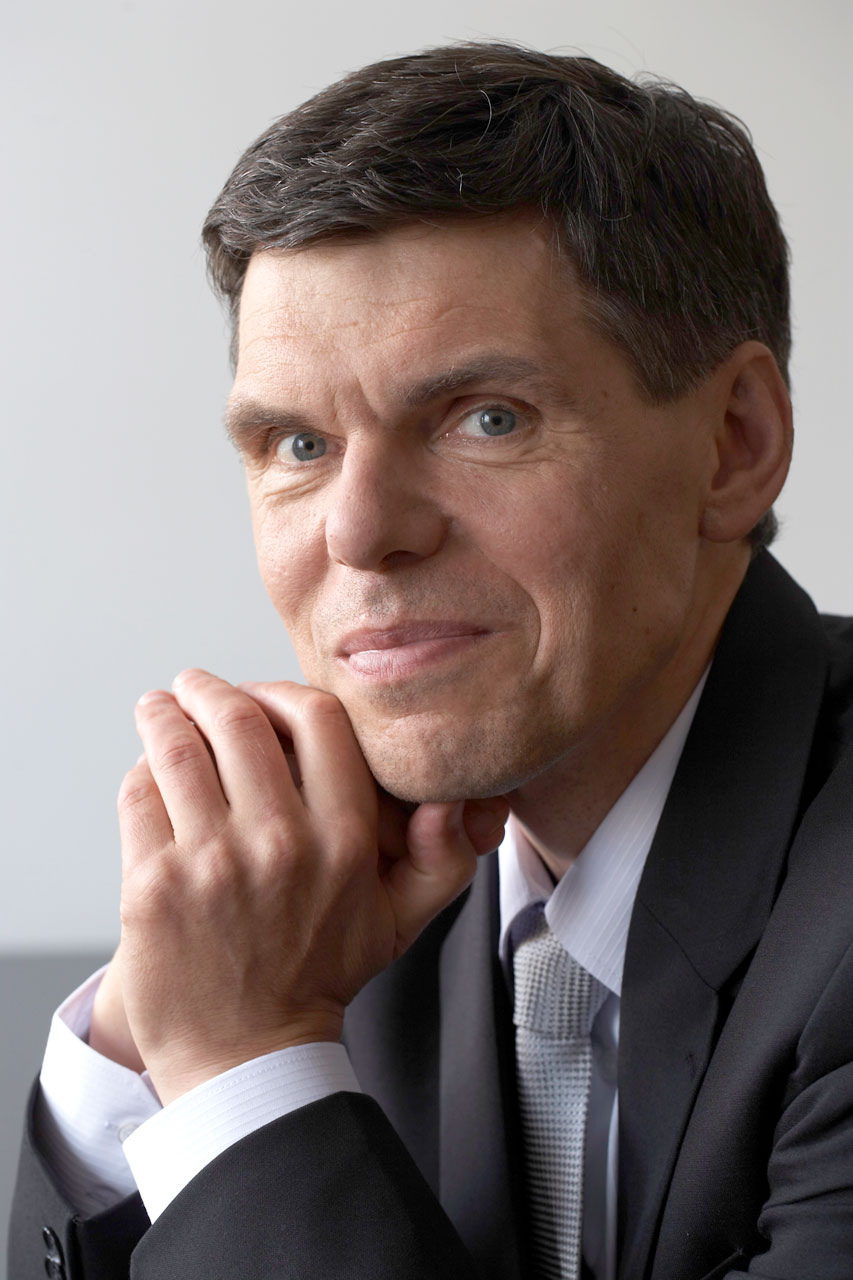
- Dědek in 2016
- Born: June 21, 1957 (age 69); Jičín, Czech Republic
- Citizenship: Czech
- Education: Czech Technical University in Prague
- Occupations: Businessman, engineer
- Spouse: Lenka Dědková
- Awards: Medal of Merit (2015); Personality of the Year of the Liberec Region (2013); Ernst & Young Entrepreneur of the Year Award (1994)
- Website: jablotron.cz

Dalibor Dědek (born June 21, 1957) is a Czech businessman and cofounder of the Jablotron Group. According to Forbes in 2021, Dědek is the 59th wealthiest Czech, with a fortune exceeding 5 billion Czech crowns.

== Study and business ==
Trained as an electrician at Sklostroj Turnov, Dalibor Dědek graduated from the Secondary School of Applied Arts in Jičín and graduated in 1983 from the Faculty of Electrical Engineering at the Czech Technical University in Prague. He worked as a programmer at LIberecké Automobilové Závody in Jablonec nad Nisou. After the Velvet Revolution he founded the company Jablotron with three cofounders. Under Dědek's leadership, the company flourished and developed into an internationally recognised, purely Czech manufacturer of security and communication technologies, largely imported to China. The basis of Jablotron's success was the development of its own line of products and its technological innovations. After twenty years in operation, Jablotron became one of the most successful Czech companies. In addition to security technology, Jablotron is renowned for its production of mobile phones. To maintain flexibility and the ability to react quickly, the company was later transformed into a holding company, Jablotron Group, as Dědek transferred a portion of his stake in the company to managers overseeing the company's operations. Concomitantly Dědek participates in research and development.

== Political activity ==
In August 2017 Dědek announced that he would run for the STAN movement in the parliamentary elections. He was supposed to be the leader of the movement's candidacy in the Ústí nad Labem Region but withdrew his candidacy on 24 August 2017 and remained only a supporter of this movement.

During the 2022 Russian invasion of Ukraine, Dědek ceased all Jablotron sales to Russia and Belarus. Moreover, he blocked all data services to existing Jablotron users in those countries, advising via uncensorable push notification: "We understand your outrage that Jablotron has blocked services to users in Russia. Please note that what is happening in Ukraine is not a peace mission. It is a brutal aggressive war in which the innocent are dying. Ukrainians, their wives and their children are dying, but Russian soldiers are also dying—your brothers and sons. However, we consider the violation to be right in a situation where it is intended to help end the aggression of war and kill people."

In May 2022 Dědek launched Gift for Putin (Darek pro Putina), a Czech campaign to raise funds by novel means for the military defence of Ukraine. In December 2022 Gift for Putin temporarily replaced Prague's controversial monument to Soviet Marshal Ivan Konev with a statue of Russian President Vladimir Putin depicted as a goblin switching off a gas valve, with a goal of later auctioning the work (titled "The Ahriman Demon", by artist/blacksmith Dušan Dostál) and donating proceeds to the purchase of weapons for Ukraine.

== Philanthropy ==
Dalibor Dědek is recognised for socially responsible activities. During the years 1990–2015, under Dědek's leadership, Jablotron Group made financial contributions toward the establishment of a winter dormitory serving the homeless population of Prague, the extensive reconstruction of a former imitation jewellery store into a modern home for the elderly in Jablonec, in support of the Neuron Endowment Fund for the Support of Science, and toward the purchase of equipment for the Jablonec Hospital. Moreover, Jablotron Group under Dědek's direction plays a role in the management and protection of valuable mountain meadows in the Jizera Mountains. Some projects are directly supported by Dalibor Dědek, such as the resumption of operation of the Presidential Cottage in the Jizera Mountains.
