= Jablotron =

Czech mobile phone company

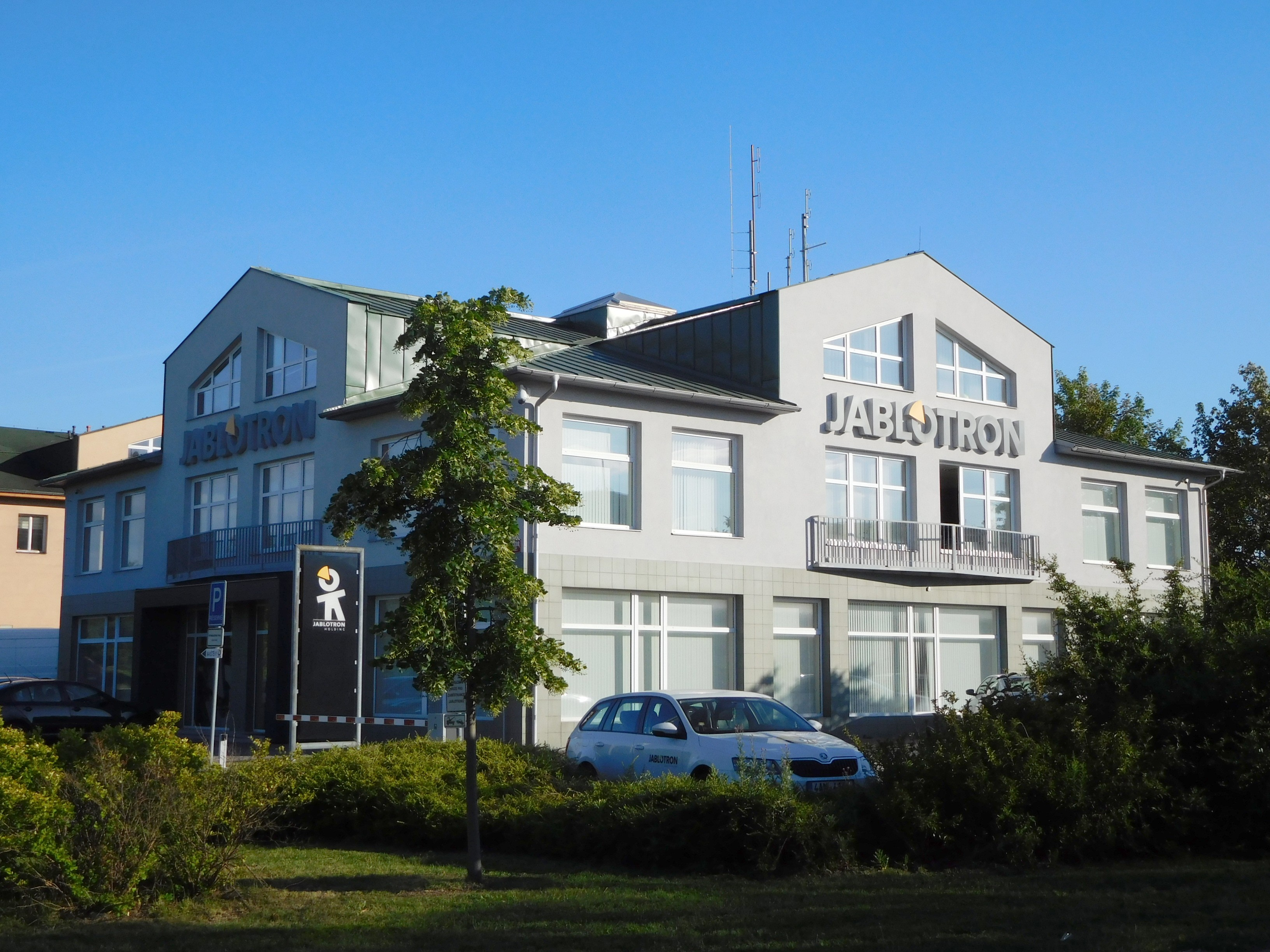
- Type: Private
- Industry: Electronics; Security technology
- Founded: 1990; 36 years ago
- Founder: Dalibor Dědek; Petr Heinl; Jiří Eršil; Zdeněk Holek
- Headquarters: Jablonec nad Nisou, Czech Republic
- Products: Alarm systems; Home automation equipment; Infant breathing monitors
- Services: Alarm monitoring and response; Electronics manufacturing services
- Owner: Soukromý svěřenský fond Královka
- Number of employees: Over 600 (2025)
- Website: www.jablotron.com

Jablotron is a Czech technology group based in Jablonec nad Nisou. It develops and manufactures electronic security systems and provides alarm monitoring and response services. Its products include intruder alarms, security detectors and cameras, home automation equipment and infant breathing monitors.

The business was founded in 1990 by Dalibor Dědek, Petr Heinl, Jiří Eršil and Zdeněk Holek. Jablotron began by developing industrial control systems. It later switched to making alarms, which it sold in Czechia and abroad. In 2010, it acquired the security company SV-Agency, extending its activities into monitoring and response services.
