= The Weapons to Ukraine Fund =

The Weapons to Ukraine Fund / A gift for Putin is a Czech civic initiative that was established to support the Ukrainian army after Ukraine was attacked by Russia in February 2022. The purpose of the associated endowment fund is to provide financial and material assistance to Ukraine through fundraising, the purchase and delivery of necessary items to Ukraine to help its citizens and public authorities, or the sale of promotional products. Members of the foundation's board of trustees include a Czech businessman Dalibor Dědek and Jan Polák.

Money from donors is collected through a symbolic online shop, where people can "purchase," for example, magazines for AK-47, thermal underwear, or a first-aid kit, or contribute to campaigns to acquire a mobile air-defense system, off-road ambulances, or drones. Donors do not receive any goods; all collected funds are transferred to the account of the Ukrainian Embassy in Prague. Under the auspices of the Czech Ministry of Defence, military equipment is then purchased from Czech manufacturers and suppliers according to the requirements of the Ukrainian army.

People have contributed, for example, to a T-72 tank named Thomas for more than 30 million Czech crowns, tank ammunition, drones, or training of rescuers and soldiers in Ukraine.

== History ==
The initiative was announced in May 2022 by entrepreneur Dalibor Dědek, with journalist Martin Ondráček participating in its organization. As of August 2023, more than 554 million Czech crowns (about €23 million) had been raised.

In August 2025, Czech volunteers from the initiative handed over an American Black Hawk helicopter to representatives of Ukrainian military intelligence (HUR). The helicopter was funded through an online collection by Czech and Slovak citizens. Approximately 21,000 donors contributed 73 million Czech crowns (€3 million) to its purchase. Symbolically, it was presented to Ukrainian president Volodymyr Zelenskyy in March of the same year by Czech president Petr Pavel.

In December 2025, Dárek pro Putina received its largest single donation to date — 100 million Czech crowns (about €4.1 million) from Ivo Lukačovič, the owner of Czech internet portal Seznam.cz. The organization decided to divide this donation among dozens of specific projects; it will be used to procure military equipment, drones, as well as medical and humanitarian supplies.
