= Monument to Soviet Tank Crews =

Military monument in Prague, Czechia

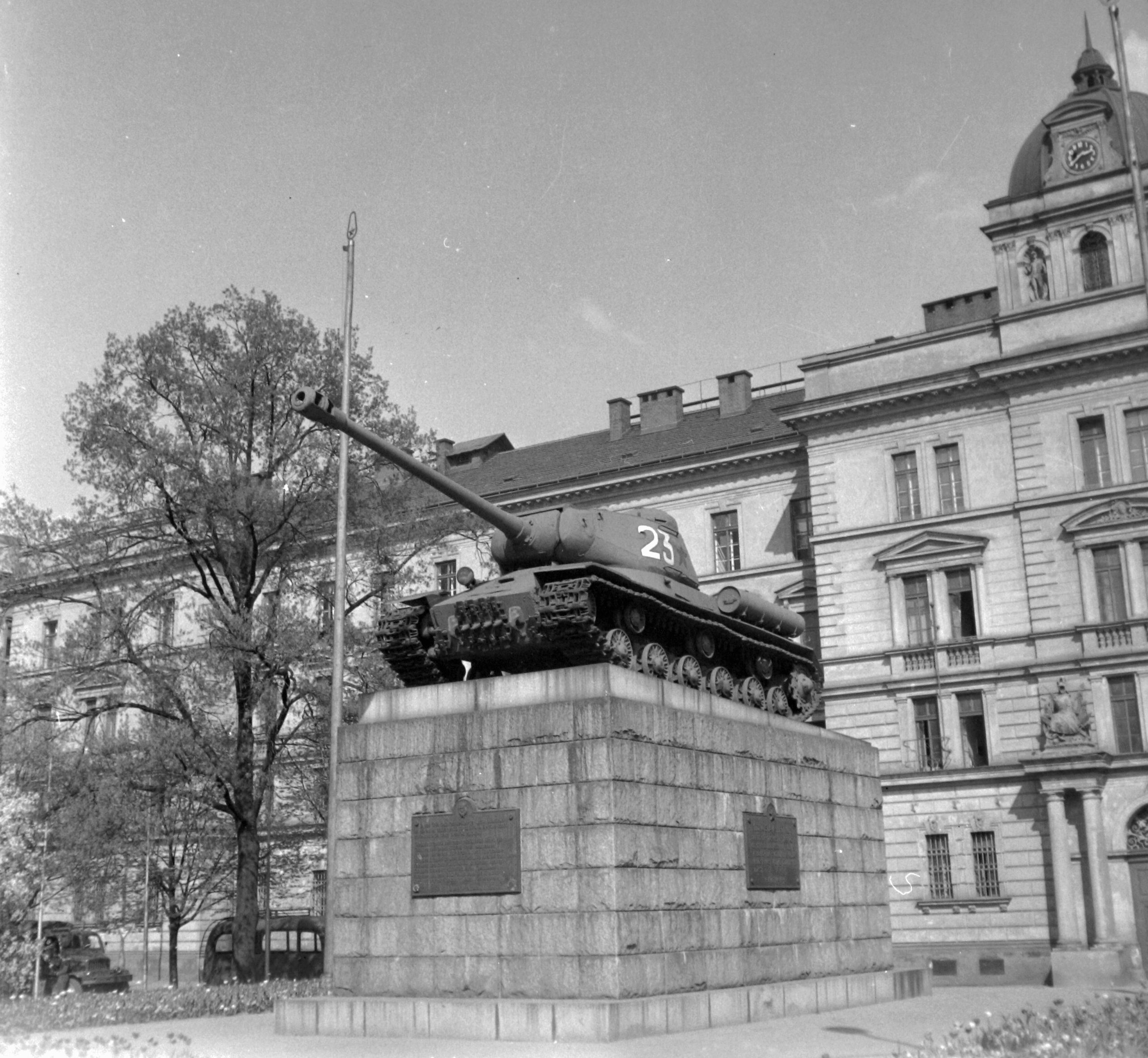
The monument in 1961

The Monument to Soviet Tank Crews (Czech: Památník sovětských tankistů) was a World War II memorial located in Prague. It is also known as the Pink Tank because it was controversially painted pink in 1991, first by installation artist David Černý and a second time by members of parliament in protest at his arrest.

The original location of the monument was 50°4′43.8″N 14°24′16.6″E.

== Monument ==
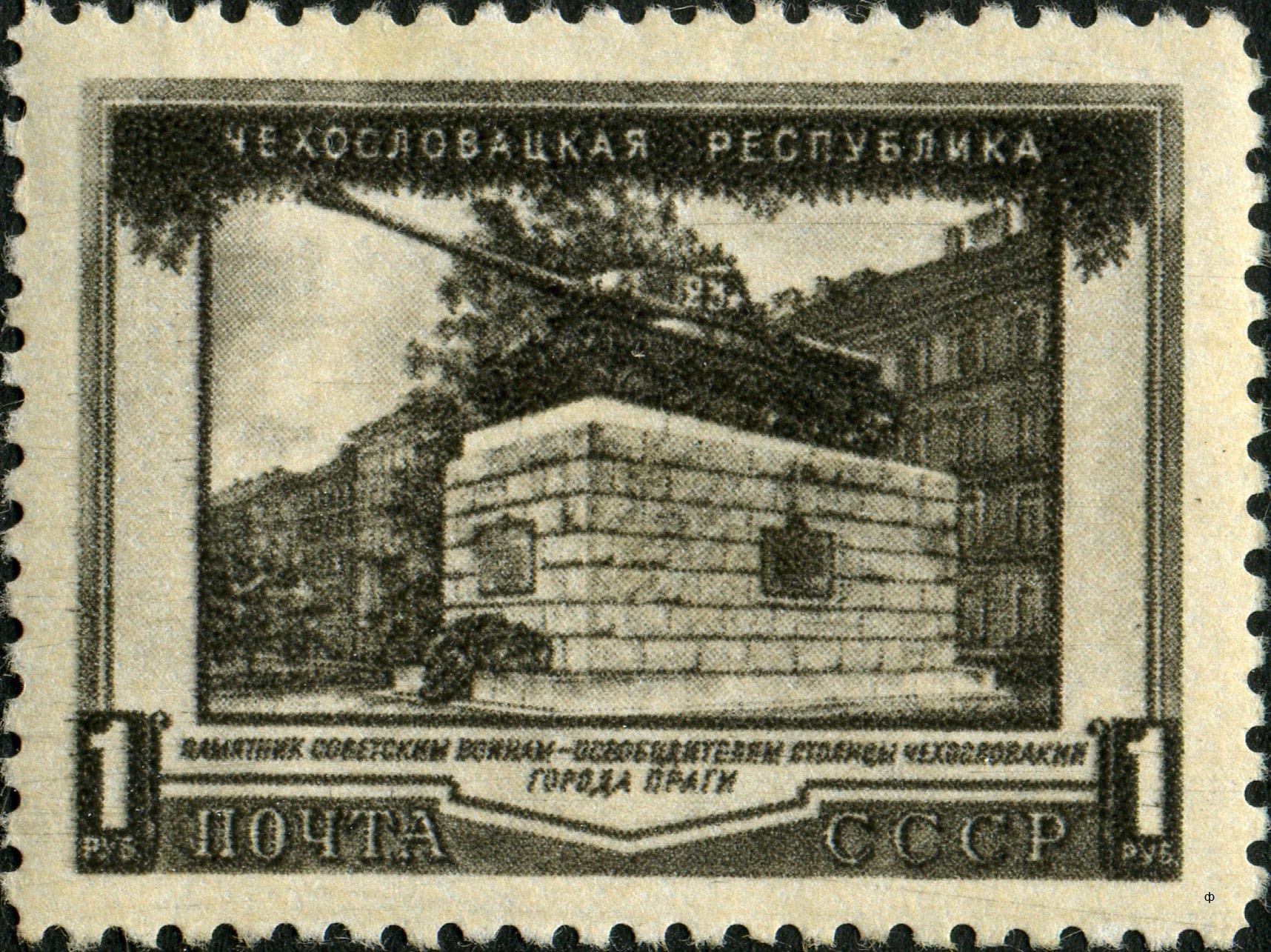
The monument, depicted on a 1951 USSR stamp

The monument was erected in Kinsky Square (Náměstí Kinských) in the Smíchov district of Prague, and was dedicated on 29 July 1945, by Soviet General Ivan Konev and municipal representatives. The tank rested on a massive five-metre stone pedestal, its barrel pointing westwards. It was built to commemorate the arrival of Konev's 1st Ukrainian Front, namely the Fourth Tank Army led by Lelyushenko, on 9 May 1945, ending the German occupation of Prague. It was originally intended to represent Lt I. G. Goncharenko's T-34-85 medium tank of the 63rd Tank Brigade, the first tank to enter Prague in May 1945 and subsequently knocked out in the street fighting. However, the monument was an IS-2m heavy tank instead of a T-34, and its turret was labelled 23 whereas Goncharenko's tank had borne the tactical marking I-24.

Following the communist coup of 1948, the monument was elevated to the status of Cultural Monument, commemorating the liberation of Prague by the Red Army, and the square was renamed Soviet Tank Square.

== Controversy and removal ==
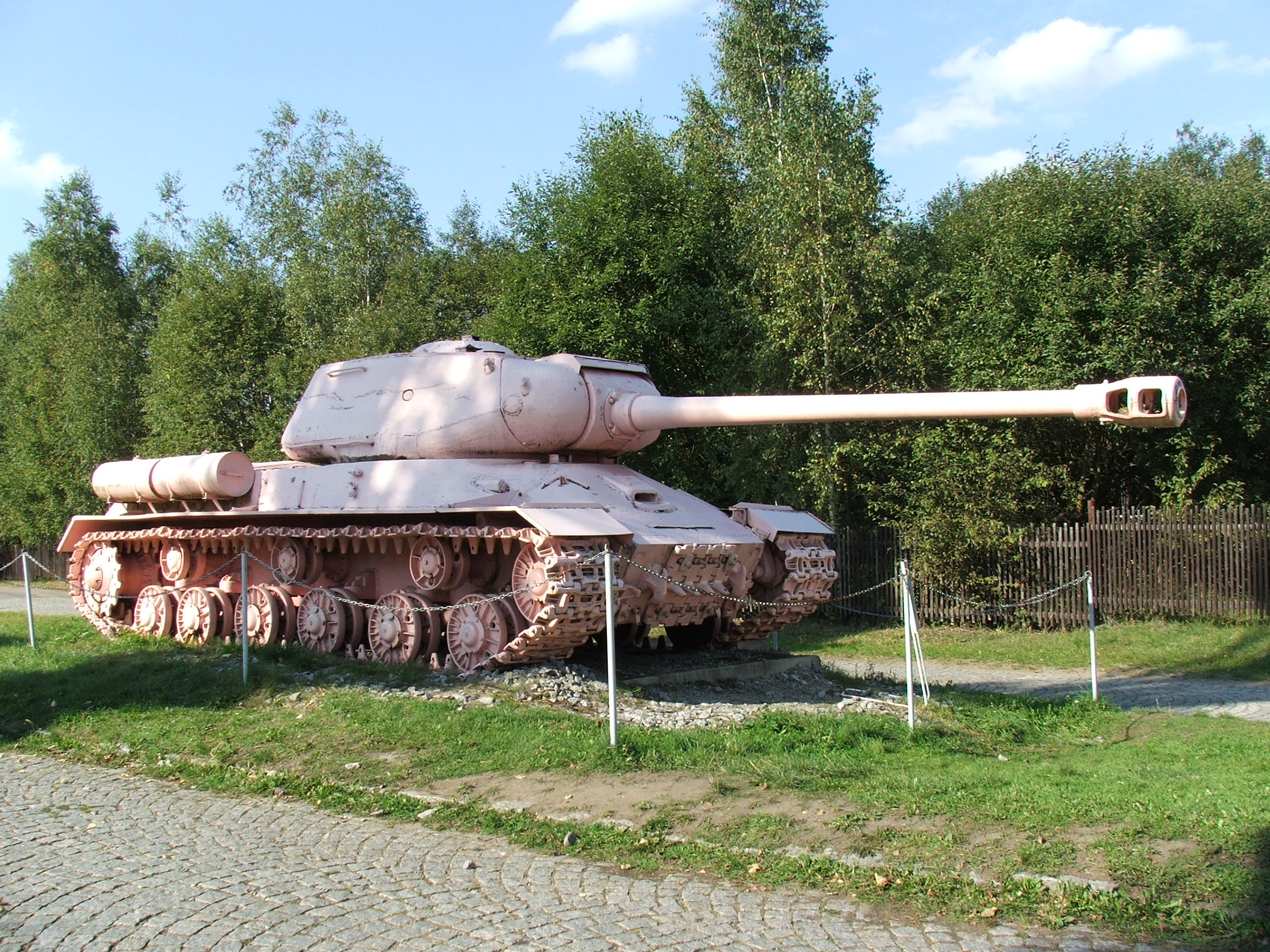
"Pink" Soviet tank "Joseph Stalin" formerly as No. 23 now in Lešany military museum

After the 1989 Velvet Revolution and the end of communist censorship, the legacy of the tank was openly discussed. For many citizens, the tank symbolised the Soviet occupation that ended the Prague Spring in 1968 and the subsequent permanent installation of Soviet military units, rather than the events of World War II. Popular local lore noted that the number 23 painted on the tank's turret was indicative of the year of the Soviet invasion (1945 + 23 = 1968). In February 1991, historian Pavel Bělina argued that there were "neither moral nor historical grounds" for preserving the monument.

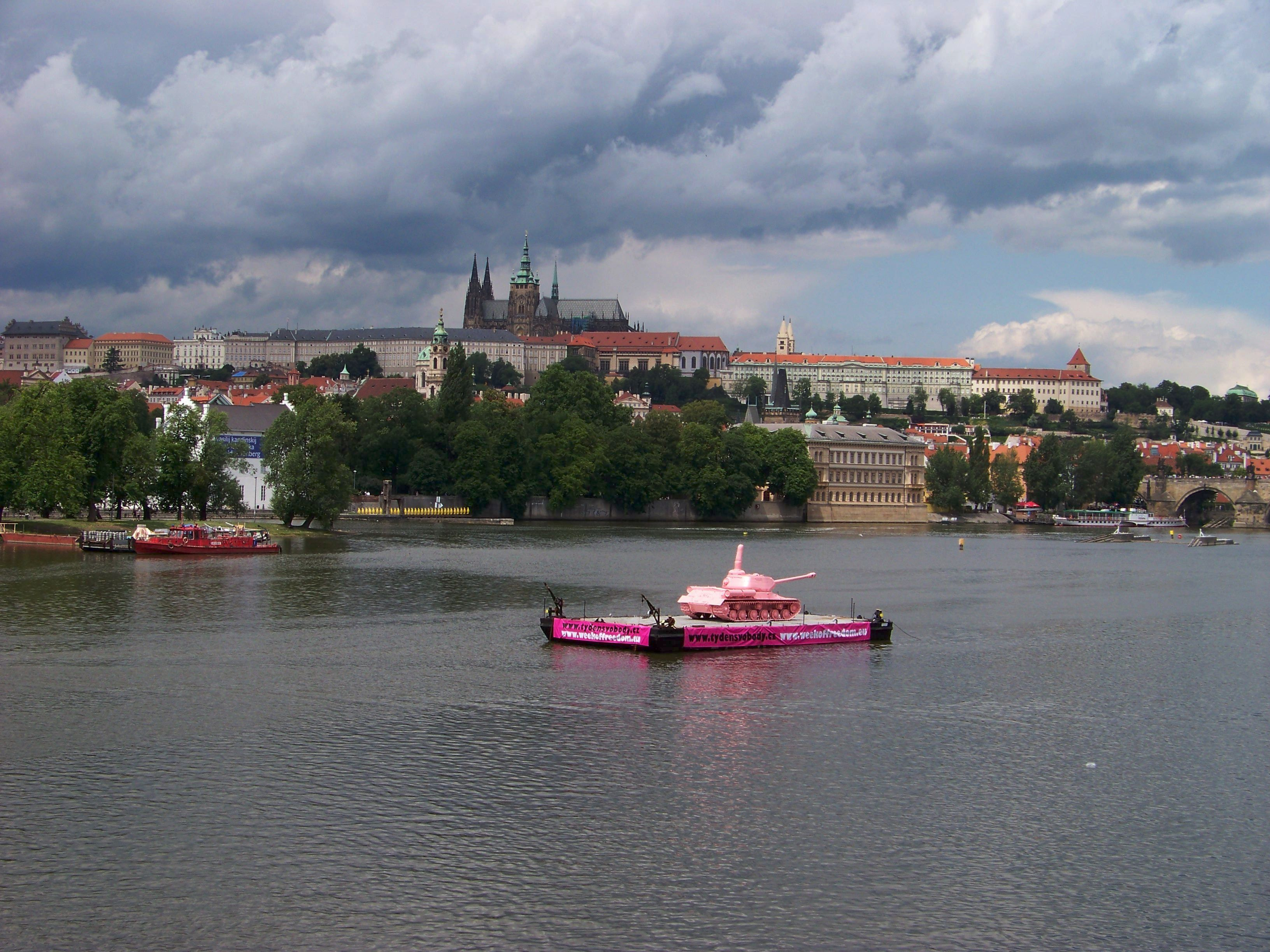
The Pink Tank by Černý on the Vltava river, 24 June 2011

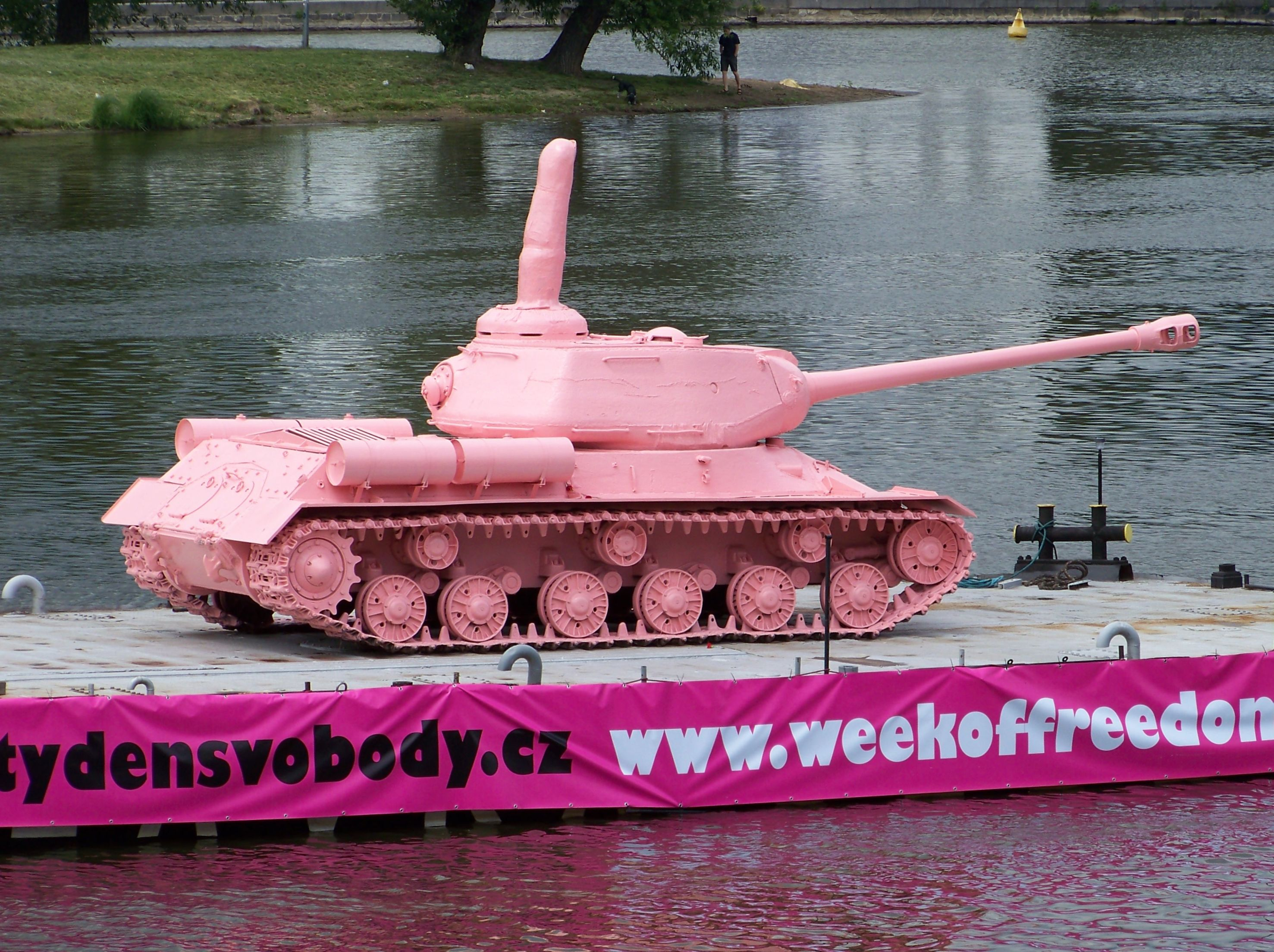
The Tank on the Vltava, showing the finger

On the night of 27/28 April 1991, art student David Černý and friends painted the tank pink and erected a large finger suggesting an obscene gesture on its turret, signing the work "David Černý and the Neostunners". Černý was arrested under an often-abused law concerning "hooliganism", and after an official protest by the Soviet government, the tank was re-painted green in time for the anniversary. However, fifteen members of the newly elected parliaments from Civic Forum and Public Against Violence took advantage of their official immunity and painted the tank back to pink on 16 May in protest against Černý's arrest. The cultural monument status was abolished, Černý was released, and the tank was removed after being repeatedly painted green, then pink again, a few more times. The tank is now located at Military Museum Lešany near Týnec nad Sázavou, about 20 kilometres south of Prague.

On 17 October 2002, a fountain called Propadliště času ("Trapdoor of Time") was installed in the spot the tank formerly occupied.

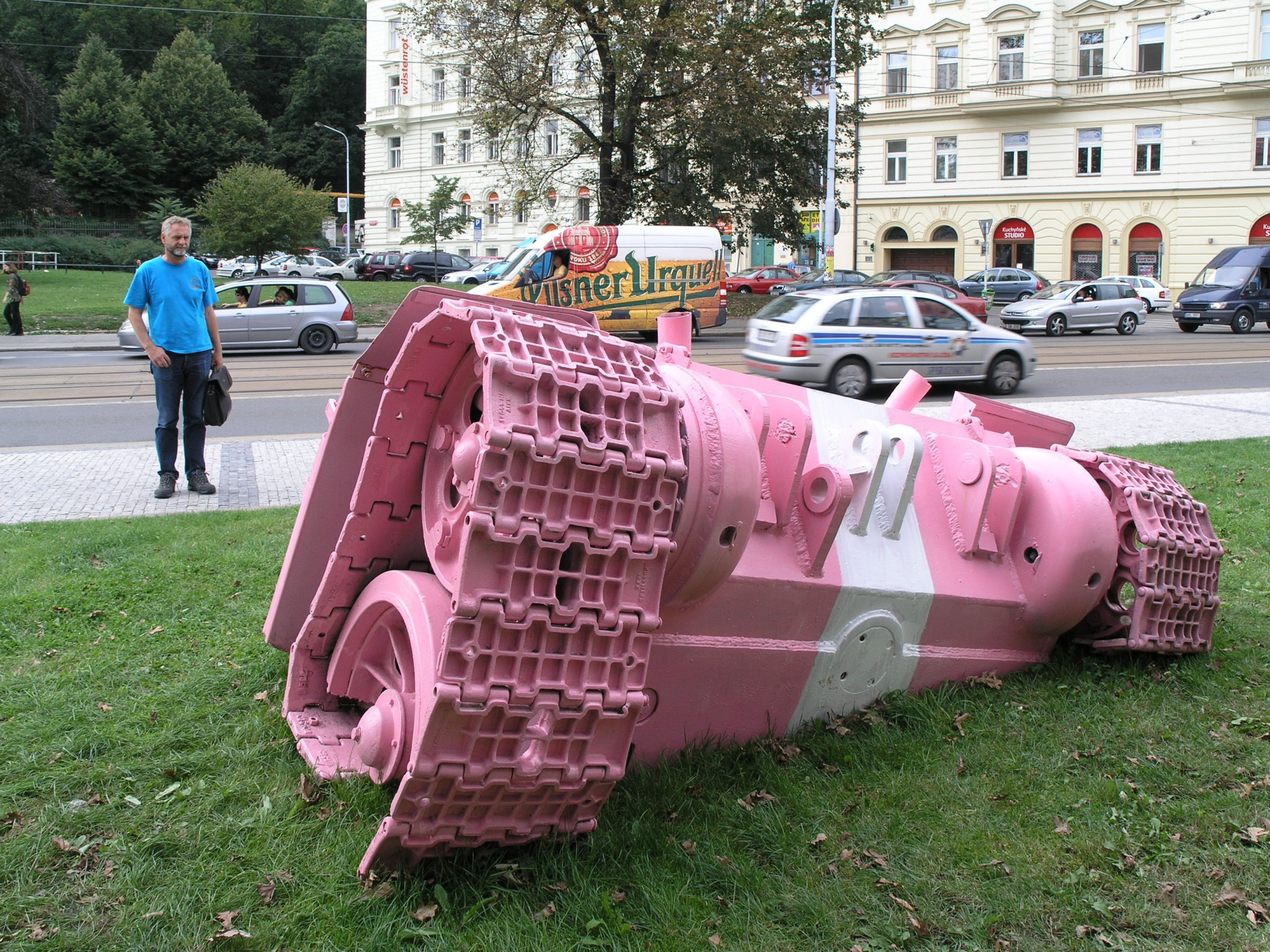
Pink tank hull with a white invasion stripe on Kinsky Square

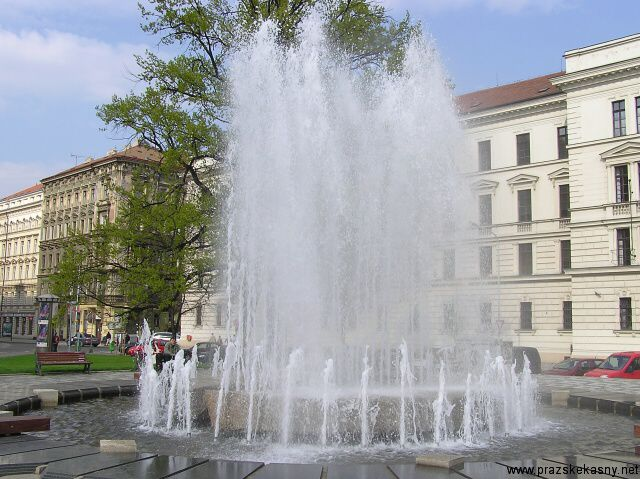
The fountain Propadliště času on the site of the monument

In 2004, a CowParade was held in Prague. One of the fibreglass cows was painted khaki by Roman Týc and provided with five-pointed red stars and white numbers 23 on both flanks, with the intention to paint it pink later on. From May to September 2004, the cow named "Romeo 23" was placed on Kinsky Square. On 8 July, one day before the planned happening when the cow was to be painted pink, two students cut the star and number from the cow's side.

Černý later proposed a new statue: a pink tank buried three-quarters in the ground. On 21 August 2008, the pink hull of a tank was unofficially installed on the spot. It has a white invasion stripe, the same as Soviet tanks that entered Czechoslovakia in 1968. According to Černý, the statue should draw attention to contemporary politics of Russia. After strong vocal objections from Prime Minister Miloš Zeman and Russian Ambassador Vasili Yakovlev, municipal representatives rejected the project. The statue was finally installed at Lázně Bohdaneč, a spa resort where occupying Soviet troops were located until the early 1990s (location: 50°4′9.426″N 15°40′58.42″E).

On 20 June 2011, the Pink Tank temporarily returned to Prague as part of a celebration of the 20th anniversary of the withdrawal of Soviet occupation forces. Its return included the erect middle finger, and the entire piece was placed on a barge on the Vltava river and displayed near the Charles Bridge until 1 July 2012.

== See also ==
- Mandela Way T-34 Tank
- Brotherhood (sculpture)

== Bibliography ==
- Wright, Patrick (2001). Tank: The Progress of a Monstrous War Machine, p. 379. Viking Adult. ISBN 0-670-03070-8.
- Zaloga, Steven J., Jim Kinnear (1996 [2004]). T-34-85 Medium Tank 1944–94, pp. 42–43. Oxford: Osprey Publishing. ISBN 1-85532-535-7.
- Zaloga, Steven J., Jim Kinnear, Andrey Aksenov & Aleksandr Koshchavtsev (1997). Soviet Tanks in Combat 1941-45: The T-28, T-34, T-34-85, and T-44 Medium Tanks, Hong Kong: Concord Publication. ISBN 962-361-615-5.
- "Pink tank" returns to Prague, floating on river
