= Oskar Hekš =

Czechoslovak long-distance runner

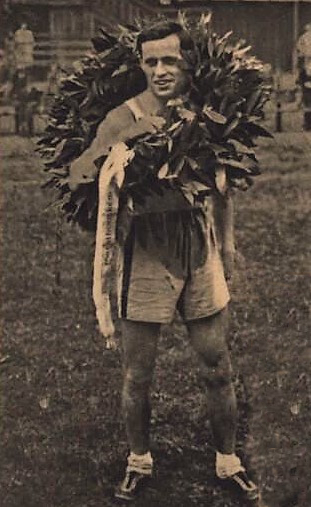
Oskar Hekš

Oskar Hekš (April 10, 1908 – March 8, 1944) was a Czechoslovak long-distance runner.

Hekš was born in Rožďalovice, present-day Czech Republic. He competed for Czechoslovakia at the 1932 Summer Olympics and came in eighth place in the Men's Marathon. He died in the Holocaust after being transferred to and gassed at Auschwitz.

== International competitions ==
Year	Competition	Venue	Position	Notes
1932	Olympic Games	Los Angeles, United States	8th	Marathon
