= Josef Vinecký =

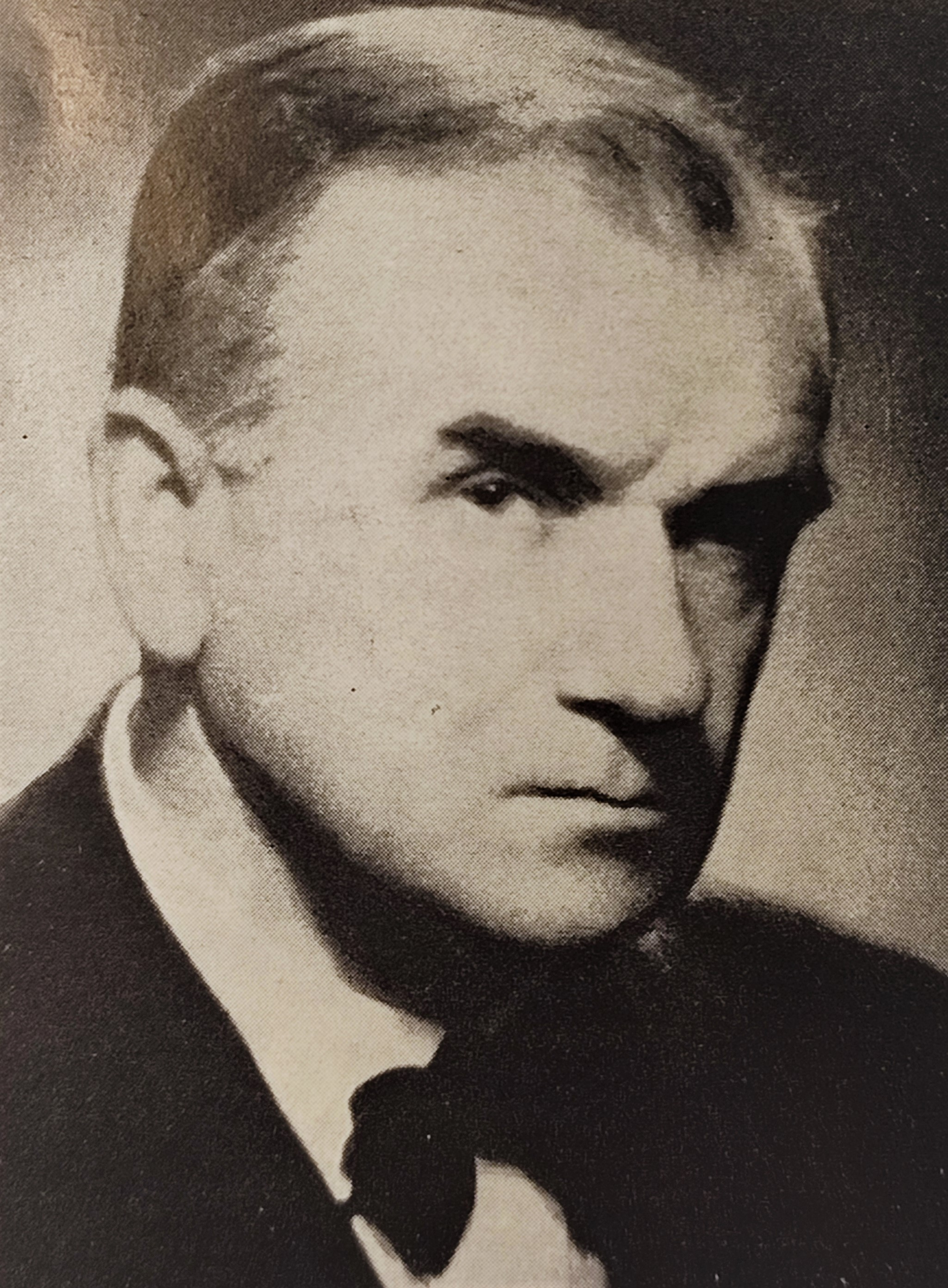
- Born: 20 February 1882; Zámostí, Bohemia, Austria-Hungary
- Died: 1 June 1949 (aged 67); Prague, Czechoslovakia
- Occupations: sculptor, ceramist, designer, university teacher
- Known for: ceramics, furniture, sculptures
- Movement: functionalism, abstraction
- Spouse: Li Thon-Vinecká

Josef Vinecký (20 February 1882 – 1 June 1949) was a Czech avant-garde sculptor, ceramist, designer and university teacher.

== Biography ==
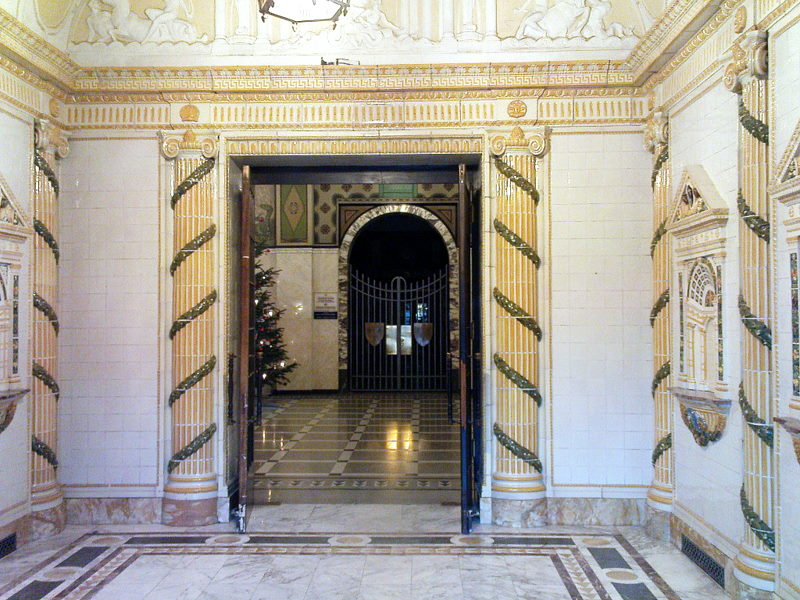
Foyer of the Imperial Baths in Wiesbaden, majolica and stone tiles, 1911-1912

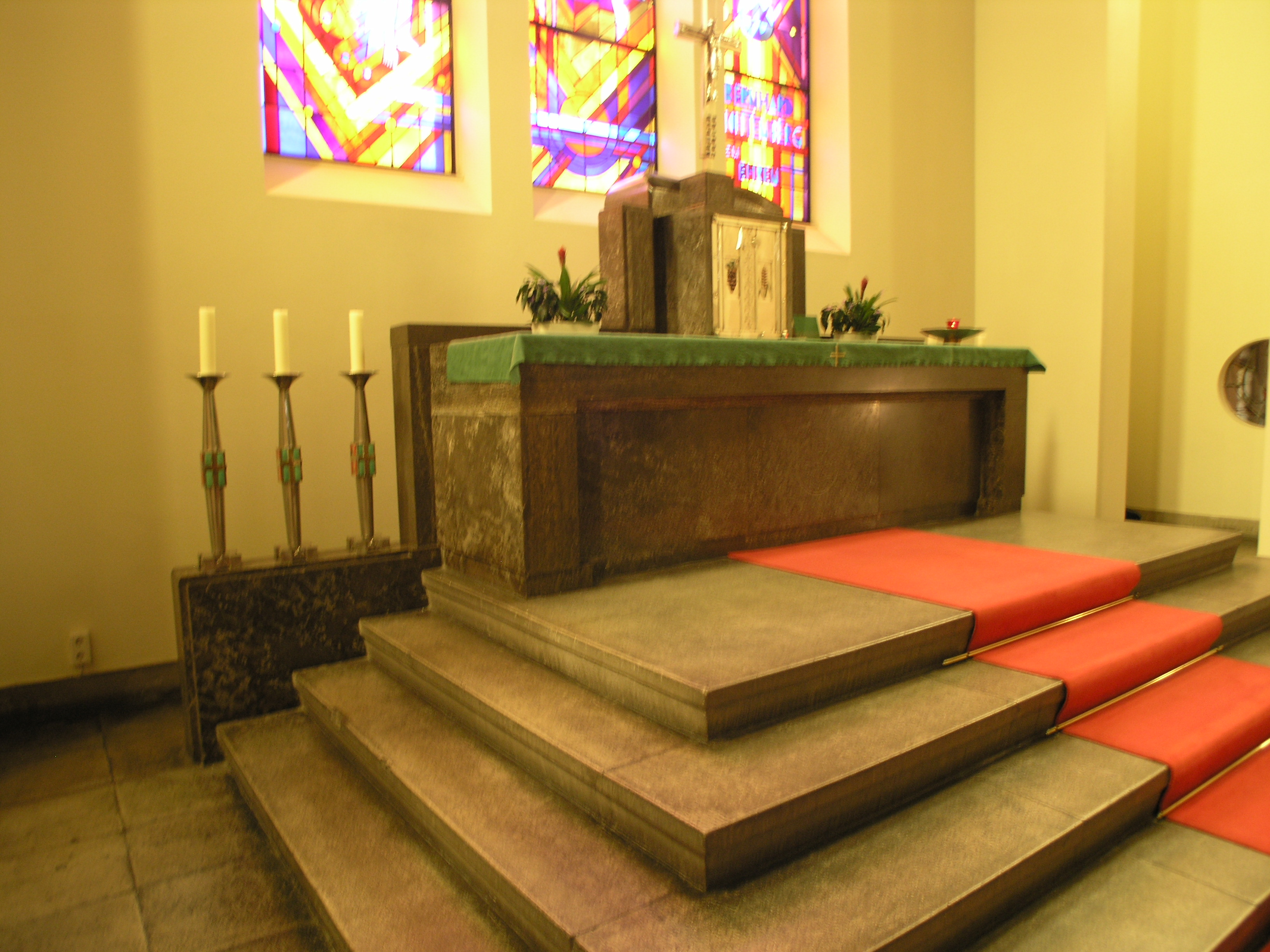
Main altar of the Church of Our Lady, Berlin-Karlshorst, 1925

Josef Vinecký was born on 20 February 1882 in Zámostí, Bohemia, Austria-Hungary (today part of Rožďalovice, Czech Republic). As a child, he learned crafting from his father, a master wheelwright.

Vinecký apprenticed in the Prague workshop of Josef Mauder as a sculptor-stonemason and in 1902 went to the School of Applied Arts in Weimar, where he studied with Henry van de Velde, and worked for eight years, running a ceramics workshop. He also worked in Antwerp for Constantin Meunier. He first trained in the historicist style, focusing on the highest technical level of crafts. He became acquainted with the artistic environment of the Bauhaus in Dessau, but his work did not reflect the movement's proclivities.

After the First World War in 1918, Vinecký settled in Wiesbaden and became friends with the avant-garde artists of the group Die blaue Vier: Lyonel Feininger, Alexey von Jawlensky, Wassily Kandinsky and Paul Klee. His relationship with Jawlensky as particularly close, and Jawlensky introduced him to the Bauhaus's members. Meanwhile, his work was developing from post-cubism to expressionism, eventually reaching functionalism.

Vinecký moved to Wrocław when his wife, the residential architect Li Thon-Vinecká, got a job at the city's Academy of Fine Arts and Crafts. Two years later, he became a teacher, teaching material science and leading art and craft workshops. He designed functionalist designs using stone, wood and other materials, such as furniture. He then oriented his own work towards industrial design, especially furniture, in which he first used bent metal tubes and wood veneer, later experimenting with synthetic materials (plexiglass, polyester, trolon). His work there culminated in an exhibition by the German Werkbund WUWA association in 1929.

After Adolf Hitler came to power, Vinecký was dismissed from the civil service as a "degenerate artist" and remained a freelance artist in Berlin until 1936. He then returned to Czechoslovakia, where his work had previously been promoted by Karel Herain. In 1936-1937 he worked in Prague. In 1937 Vinecký was appointed professor at the Academy of Arts and Crafts in Bratislava. In 1945-1949 he taught at the Institute of Art Education in Olomouc. In addition, he designed ceramics (tableware, vases), but also goldsmith's work.

He died in Prague on 1 June 1949. He is buried in the cemetery in Rožďalovice.

== Selected works ==
- Interior of the city baths Kaiser Friedrich Therme in Wiesbaden, majolica and marble tiles, 1911-1912
- Architectural arrangement of the garden with stone tiles in Wiesbaden, 1922
- Standing statue, stone, ceramic, metal and glass, 1923–1824
- Head, two versions, metal, patinated plaster, 1923
- Altar, tabernacle and baptismal font in the Marienkirche in Berlin–Karlshorst, 1925, marble, metal (destroyed in bombing in 1945, canteen restored 1985)
- Furniture for his own study at the Academy of Fine Arts and Crafts in Wrocław, 1928–1929
- Altar, tabernacle and baptismal font in the church of Our Lady of the Mountains in Bozkov, 1940
- Memorial to fallen soldiers in the First and Second World Wars in the park by the church in Bozkov, 1945
- Monstrance and chalice
