= Adam of Veleslavín =

Adam of Veleslavín (Czech: Adamové z Veleslavína) was a Prague bourgeois family which acquired a coat of arms and a predicate in the second half of the 16th century. The village of Veleslavín (today a district of Prague) previously belonged to the Břevnov Monastery. In the 16th century, it was the property of the highest royal burgrave, and there were also burgher houses and courtyards. Štěpán Adam, the tenant of Prague's old town mills, also owned a yard here. He and his wife Regina, a daughter of a Kutná Hora sculptor, had a son, Daniel Adam z Veleslavína, who became one of the most famous members of the family.

== See also ==
- Daniel Adam z Veleslavína
