= Rožďalovice =

- Town
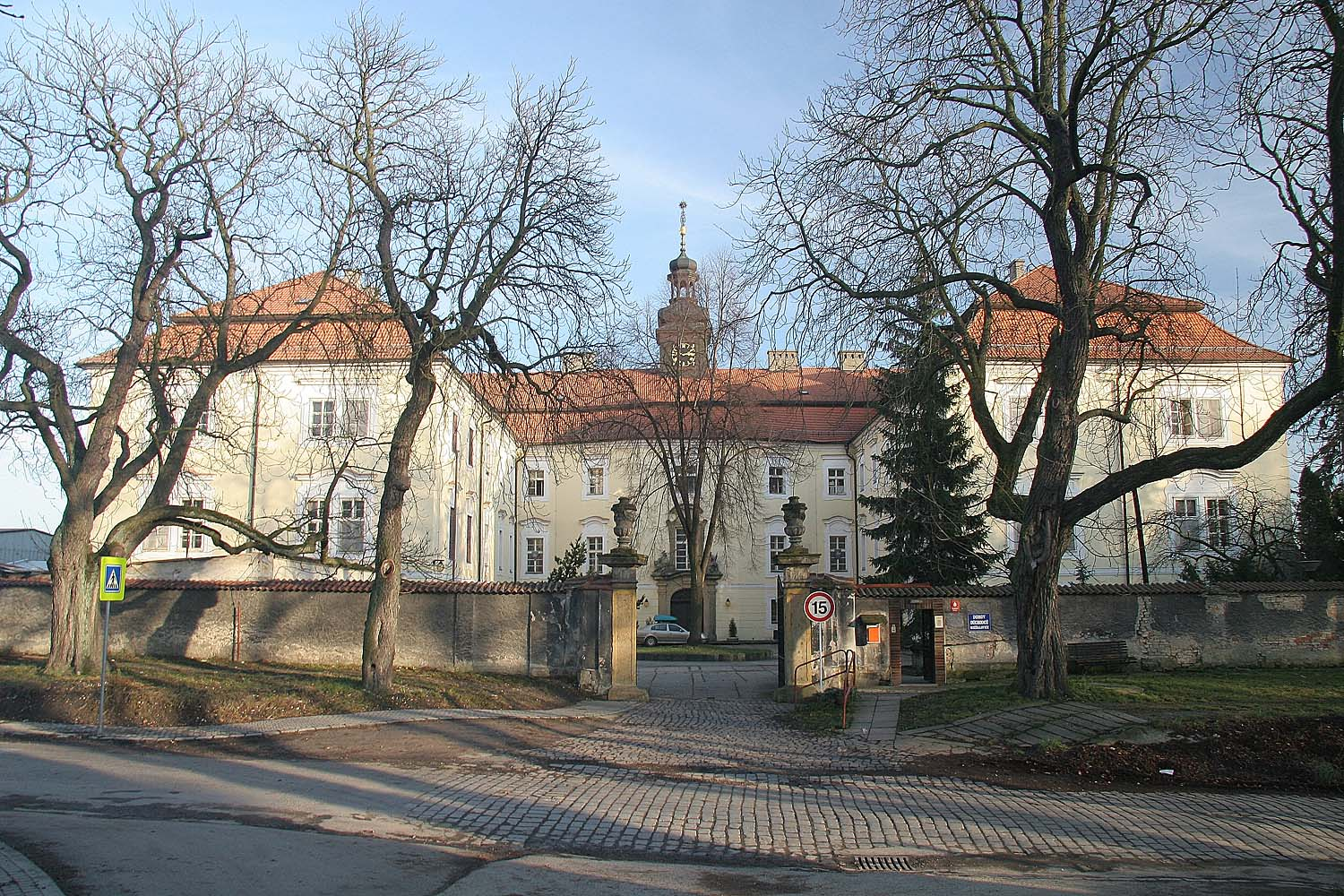
- Rožďalovice Castle

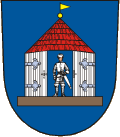
- Coat of arms

- Location in the Czech Republic
- Coordinates: 50°18′17″N 15°10′11″E
- Country: Czech Republic
- Region: Central Bohemian
- District: Nymburk
- First mentioned: 1223

Government
  - Mayor: Petr Kapal

Area
  - Total: 23.91 km^{2} (9.23 sq mi)
- Elevation: 198 m (650 ft)

Population (2026-01-01)
  - Total: 1,716
  - Density: 71.77/km^{2} (185.9/sq mi)
- Time zone: UTC+1 (CET)
  - Summer (DST): UTC+2 (CEST)
- Postal code: 289 34
- Website: www.rozdalovice.eu

Rožďalovice (Czech pronunciation: [ˈroʒɟalovɪtsɛ]) is a town in Nymburk District in the Central Bohemian Region of the Czech Republic. It has about 1,700 inhabitants.

== Administrative division ==
Rožďalovice consists of seven municipal parts (in brackets population according to the 2021 census):

- Rožďalovice (1,293)
- Hasina (88)
- Ledečky (25)
- Podlužany (68)
- Podolí (46)
- Viničná Lhota (31)
- Zámostí (147)

== Etymology ==
The name is derived from the surname Rožďál, meaning "the village of Rožďál's people".

== Geography ==
Rožďalovice is located about 16 kilometres (10 mi) northeast of Nymburk and 49 km (30 mi) northeast of Prague. It lies in the Central Elbe Table. The highest point is a place called Kostelíček at 241 m (791 ft) above sea level. The stream Štítarský potok flows through the municipal territory.

== History ==
The first written mention of Rožďalovice is from 1223. Around 1340, the village was promoted to a town by King John of Bohemia. The most important owners of Rožďalovice, during whose rule the town flourished, were the Křinecký of Ronov family (end of the 15th century – 1622), the Waldstein family (1622–1760) and the Lobkowicz family (1815–1930).

== Demographics ==
Historical population

| Year | Pop. | ±% |
|---|---|---|
| 1869 | 2,715 | — |
| 1880 | 3,040 | +12.0% |
| 1890 | 2,965 | −2.5% |
| 1900 | 2,824 | −4.8% |
| 1910 | 2,632 | −6.8% |

| Year | Pop. | ±% |
|---|---|---|
| 1921 | 2,532 | −3.8% |
| 1930 | 2,449 | −3.3% |
| 1950 | 2,063 | −15.8% |
| 1961 | 2,095 | +1.6% |
| 1970 | 1,826 | −12.8% |

| Year | Pop. | ±% |
|---|---|---|
| 1980 | 1,800 | −1.4% |
| 1991 | 1,557 | −13.5% |
| 2001 | 1,628 | +4.6% |
| 2011 | 1,678 | +3.1% |
| 2021 | 1,698 | +1.2% |

Source: Censuses

== Transport ==
Rožďalovice is located on the railway line Nymburk–Jičín.

== Sights ==
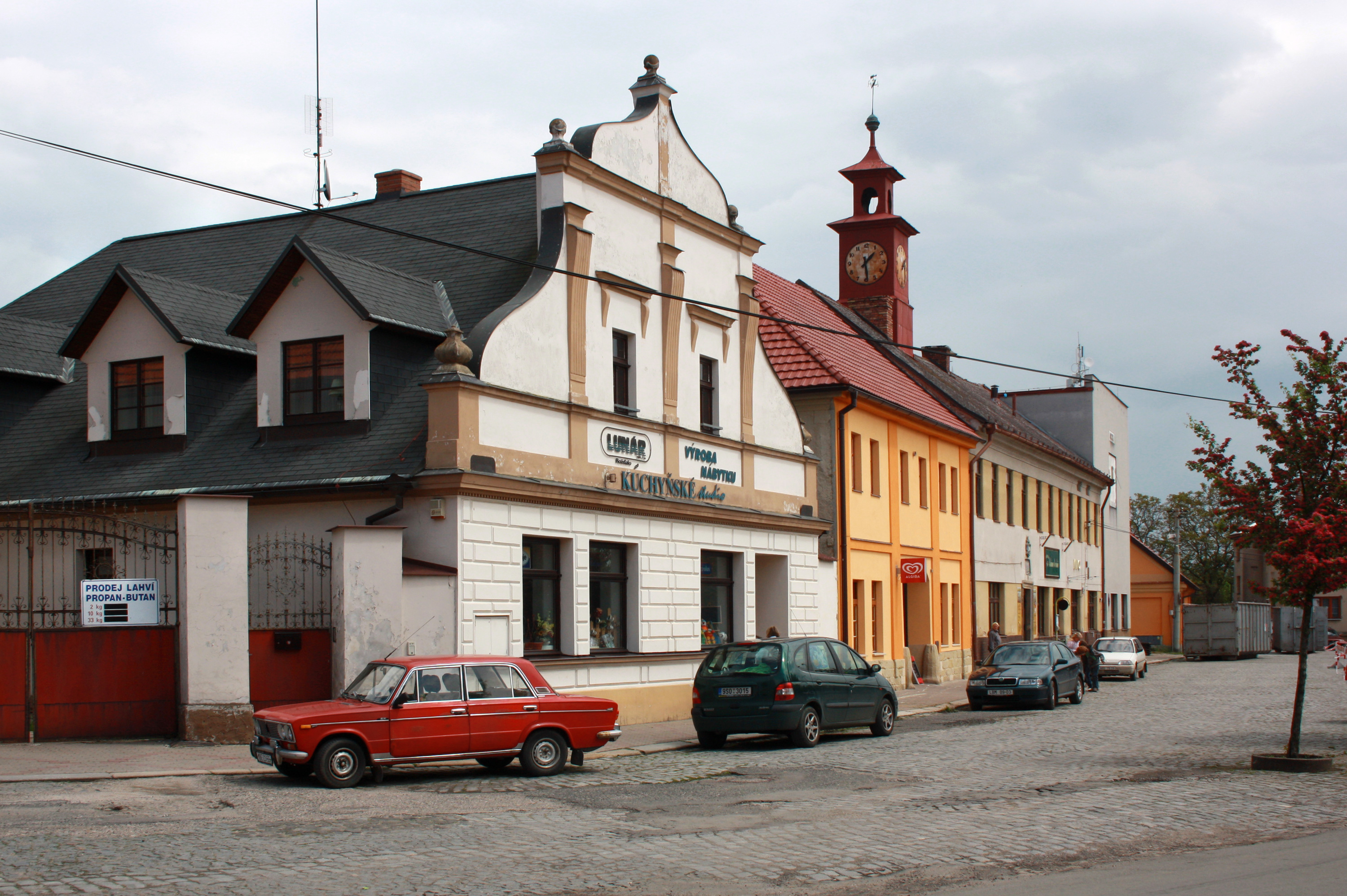
Old town hall

The Rožďalovice Castle is originally a Renaissance building. It was built in 1622 and rebuilt in the Baroque style in 1760, when the clock tower was also added. Further modifications were made in 1935–1938. The sculptural decoration comes from Michael Brokoff. The castle is surrounded by a castle park and gardens. Today it houses a retirement home and is inaccessible to the public.

The Church of Saint Gall was built in the Baroque style in 1725–1734. It was built on the site of an old Gothic demolished church.

== Notable people ==
- Jiří Melantrich of Aventino (c. 1511–1580), printer and publisher
- Josef Vinecký (1882–1949), artist
- Oskar Hekš (1908–1944), long-distance runner
