= Jiří Melantrich of Aventino =

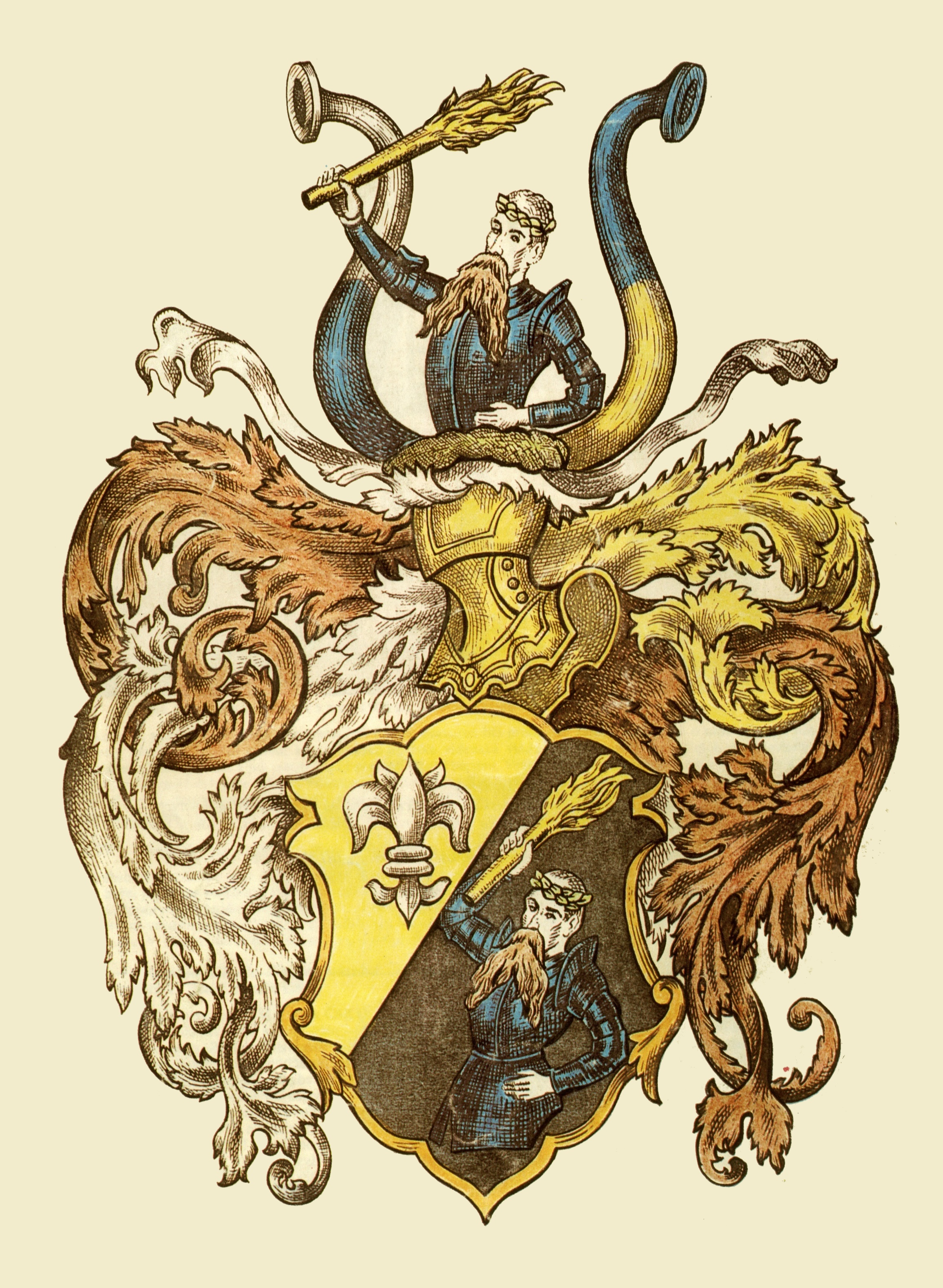
Coat-of-arms of Jiří Melantrich, which he received in 1557

Jiří Melantrich of Aventino (Czech: Jiří Melantrich z Aventina; born Jiří Černý Rožďalovický; c. 1511 – 19 November 1580) was a Czech Renaissance printer and publisher.

Melantrich lived in the 16th century, in a period considered one of the best for literature written in Czech until the 18th century. This fact made Melantrich one of the most important symbols of this language during the period of the Czech National Revival in the 19th century. The important Prague publishing company Melantrich, established in 1897, is named after him. Melantrich himself established a small printing workshop in Prague, which gradually became a company of European significance. The Melantrich's Bible, probably his most important book, was published five times between 1549 and 1577. He also published books about religion and morality for both Roman Catholic and Protestant readers. He published books of various genres, including the writings of Desiderius Erasmus, Czech Renaissance Humanism literature, poems in Latin, Czech and German, translations of the herbarium by Pietro Andrea Mattioli, handbooks and dictionaries, legal literature, books for free-time and also children literature.

Melantrich was a member of the executive council of the Old Town of Prague. In 1557, he received the title "of Aventino" and a coat-of-arms. During his lifetime, Melantrich was known as a person educated in the spirit of Renaissance Humanism, a Lutheran, who tolerated Roman Catholicism.

From 1576, he collaborated with Daniel Adam of Veleslavín, an important Czech writer, who took over the printing workshop after Melantrich's death.

== Life ==
Jiří Melantrich was born Jiří Černý Rožďalovický in Rožďalovice. Very little is known of his early life. According to Daniel Adam of Veleslavín he died at the age of 69, and it is therefore possible that he was born in 1511. He came from a non-wealthy Utraquist family from Rožďalovice, near Nymburk. The first mention of him is from 1534, the year he became a bachelor at the Faculty of Arts of the Charles University in Prague. He may have studied in Wittenberg, Germany. His supposed encounter with another Czech intellectual, Zikmund Hrubý of Jelení, who worked in the printing workshop of Johann Froben in Basel, has not been proved. Around that time he changed his name to "Melantrich", meaning "black-haired". In 1545, he lived at the court of Jan of Pernštejn, where he published a Lutheran book in the workshop of Jan Günther. In 1545 or 1546 he went to Prague. He established a workshop and gradually started to flourish. After a revolt in 1547, however, king Ferdinand I of Habsburg forbade Czech Protestant literature. Melantrich joined the company of the Catholic Bartoloměj Netolický, and was thus allowed to publish more books. He worked there till 1552, when he started to promote separately again. The collaboration with Netolický was quite useful for Melantrich - he published many books, especially shorter ones, but also the whole New Testament. Later he completely took over Netolický's workshop. He moved his workshop from Malá Strana to the Old Town, where he gained a citizenship.

In 1554 he married, subsequently becoming a widower and marrying again. He befriended new colleagues such as Tadeáš Hájek, and he acquired many useful contacts. In 1556 he published Melantrich's Bible, in 1562 the Czech edition of Mattioli's herbarium and in 1563 he printed the German version, translated by Georg Handsch. The Czech version was successful not just in Czech Lands, but also in Poland. The German translation gained success in the whole German-speaking world. Occasionally he attended the book fair in Frankfurt.

In 1564 he published a book about law and justice in Czech lands by Volf of Vřesovec, and after that he published mostly shorter, less important books. In 1570, he published a new edition of his Bible. This edition was problematic for official Austrian censorship, although there were no changes since the last edition. The religious situation in the Czech lands was somewhat difficult in that time, and it was finished in 1618 by the Second Defenestration of Prague. In 1576 his oldest daughter, Anna, married his friend Daniel Adam z Veleslavína. He kept his workshop together with Daniel Adam, but there were some splits between them - Daniel Adam was more rebellious to the censorship. On 15 November 1580 Melantrich wrote his testament, and he died in Prague on 19 November 1580. He is buried in the Bethlehem Chapel in Prague.

The proof that his relations with Daniel Adam were not very good is provided by the fact that he bequeathed everything to his son Jiří, who wasn't adult in that time, and nothing to Daniel Adam. Jiří Melantrich came of age in 1584, but quickly sunk into debt, and when he died in 1586, the workshop was taken over by Daniel Adam, as the main creditor. He continued in his way to fight the censorship.

== Sources ==
- Rudolfinská Praha/Rudolfine Prague 1576-1612 - A Guidebook. Prague: Středoevropská galerie a nakladatelství. 2006. ISBN 978-80-902258-4-8.
