= Nádraží Veleslavín =

Nádraží Veleslavín may refer to:

- Praha-Veleslavín railway station
- Nádraží Veleslavín (Prague Metro)
