= Daniel Adam of Veleslavín =

Czech lexicographer and publisher (1546–1599)

- Painting by Jan Vilímek
- Born: 31 August 1546; Prague, Bohemia
- Died: 18 October 1599 (aged 53); Prague, Bohemia
- Education: University of Prague
- Occupations: Lexicographer, publisher, translator
- Relatives: Adam of Veleslavín family
- Writing career
- Notable work: Kalendář historický

Daniel Adam of Veleslavín (Czech: Daniel Adam z Veleslavína; 31 August 1546 – 18 October 1599) was a Czech lexicographer, publisher, translator and writer. He significantly contributed to the development of the Czech language and education in the Czech lands.

== Early life and education ==
Daniel Adam was born on 31 August 1546 in Prague, into the family of a miller. He studied at the University of Prague, and from 1569 to 1576 he was a professor there.

== Marriage and late life ==
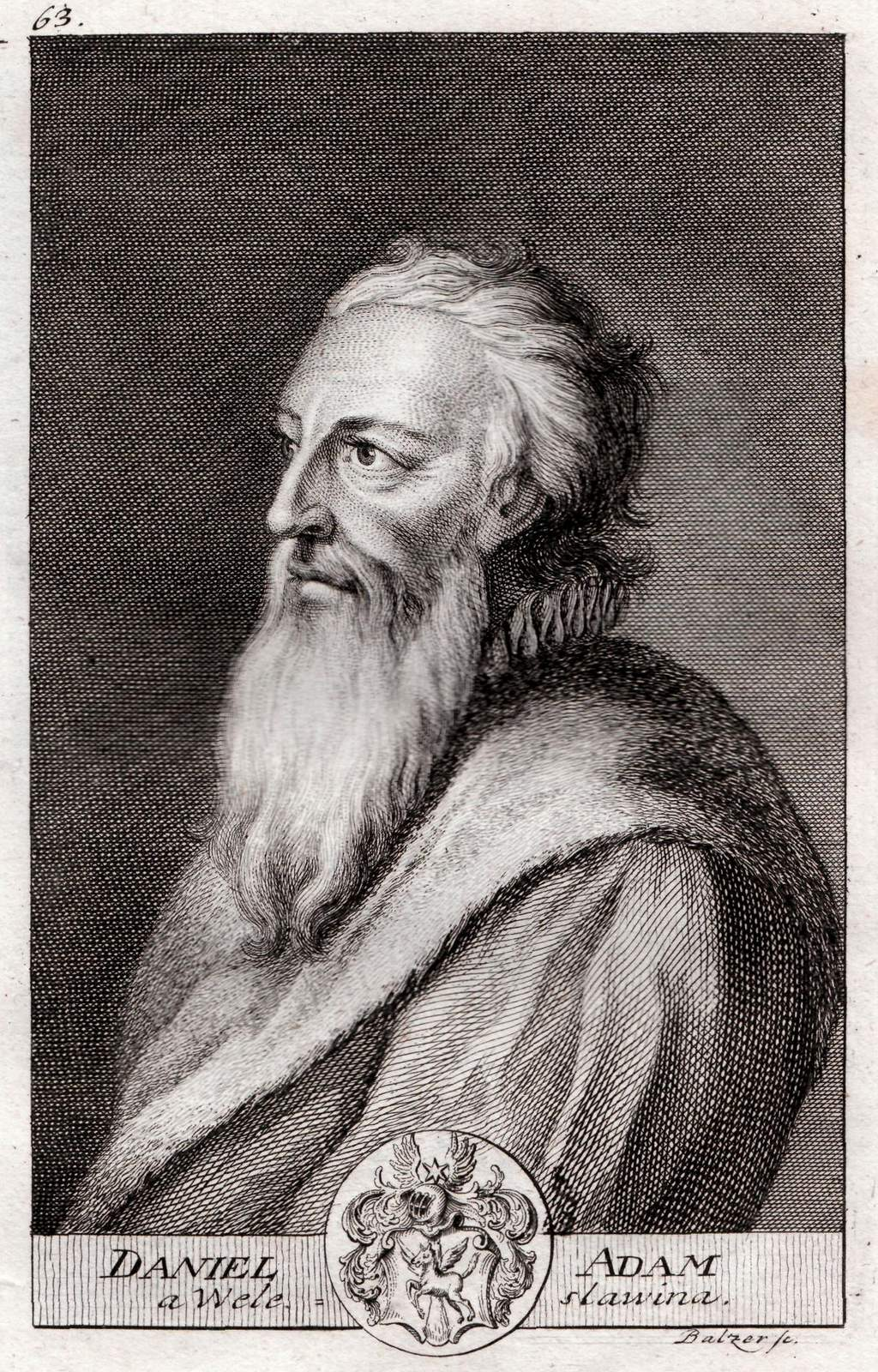
Daniel Adam of Veleslavín, drawing from 1772

In 1576, Daniel Adam married Anna, the oldest daughter of the publisher Jiří Melantrich of Aventino, and became burgher of the Old Town of Prague. They had three children: Jiří, Dorota and Samuel. After the marriage, Daniel Adam started working at the Jiří Melantrich's printing house. Because professors of the university were required to keep celibacy and because Daniel Adam wanted to focus on the work in the printing house, he left the university. From 1578, Daniel Adam was allowed to called himself "of Veleslavín" for his intellectual merits. He chose this name in honour of his father's birthplace.

In 1589, three years after the death of Jiří Melantrich Jr., he inherited the printing house after legal battles, but he managed it throughout the entire period of the disputes (1583–1586). However, he paid off the printing house's debts for another seven years.

Daniel Adam of Veleslavín owned the printing house until his death. He died in Prague on 18 October 1599. After his death, the printing house was managed by his wife Anna Adamová (died 1605).

== Work ==
Daniel Adam of Veleslavín worked at the printing house not only as a deputy manager, but also participated in the operation as an author, translator and editor. He did not want to publish books only for Latin-speaking scholars, but was interested in how to contribute to the education of broad segments of the population. Therefore, he published a number of educational books on various topics: historical, geographical, political, medical and others. Thanks to his education, many important books were printed that less educated printers might have overlooked. He clung to the Czech language and tried to work on its promotion and good standard. He did not subordinate the printing press to commercial interests. He gathered like-minded writers around him to help him realize his plans.

Daniel Adam's most meritorious publishing achievement was the printing of the six-volume Bible of Kralice, which is still considered a model of beautiful literary language. It was published in 1579, but the Czech language used in it is timeless and still understandable today.

The most important work that Daniel Adam of Veleslavín wrote himself is Kalendář historický ('Historical Calendar'). It was published in 1578 and then in an expanded version in 1590.

== Honours and legacy ==
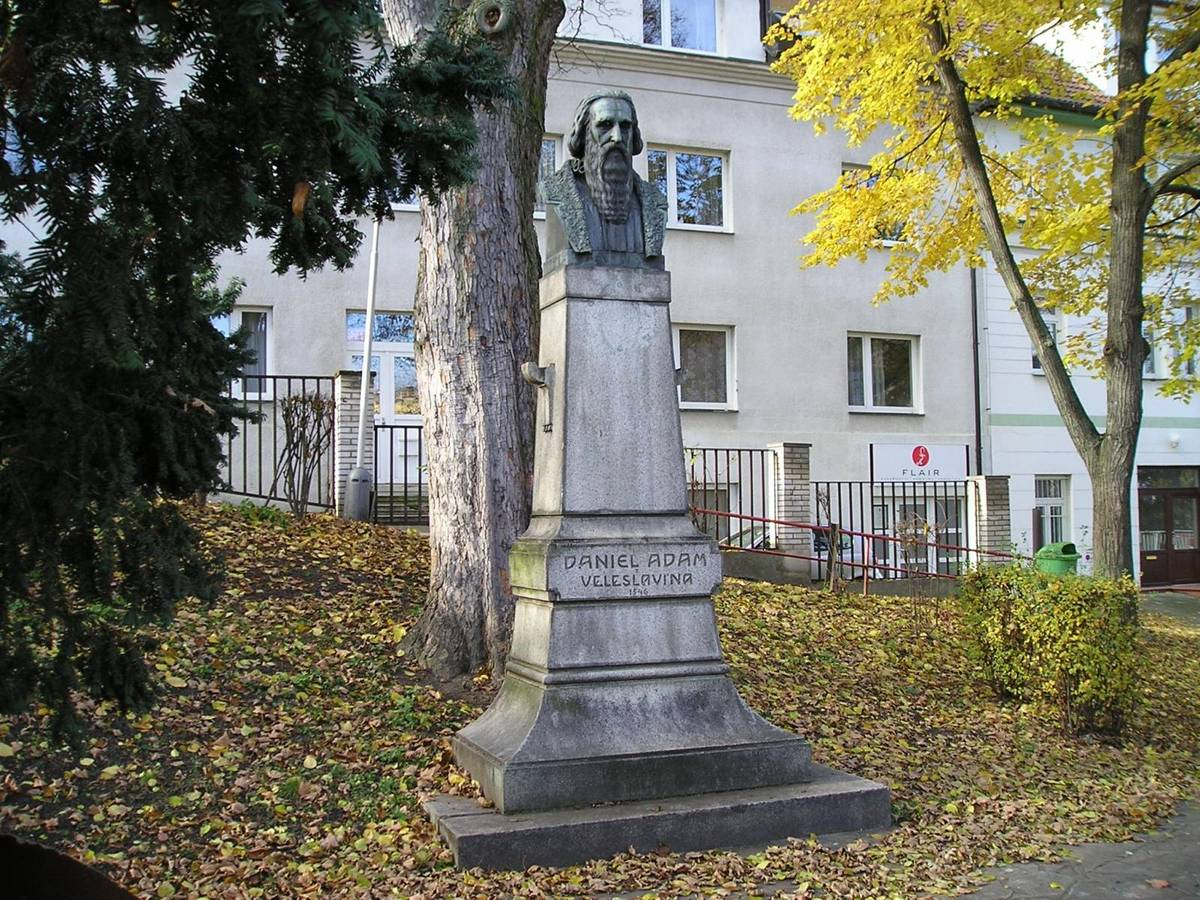
Monument to Daniel Adam of Veleslavín in Prague-Veleslavín

Daniel Adam of Veleslavín significantly contributed to the development of the Czech language and education in the Czech lands, and in the context of the history of the Czech lands, the last third of the 16th century is called Veleslavín Era after him.

In 1902, the Monument to Daniel Adam of Veleslavín was unveiled in Prague-Veleslavín. It is an Art Nouveau work of the sculptor Antonín Procházka, protected as a cultural monument.
