= Jižní Město =

Housing estate in Prague, Czechia

Coordinates: 50°2′3.76″N 14°32′16.75″E

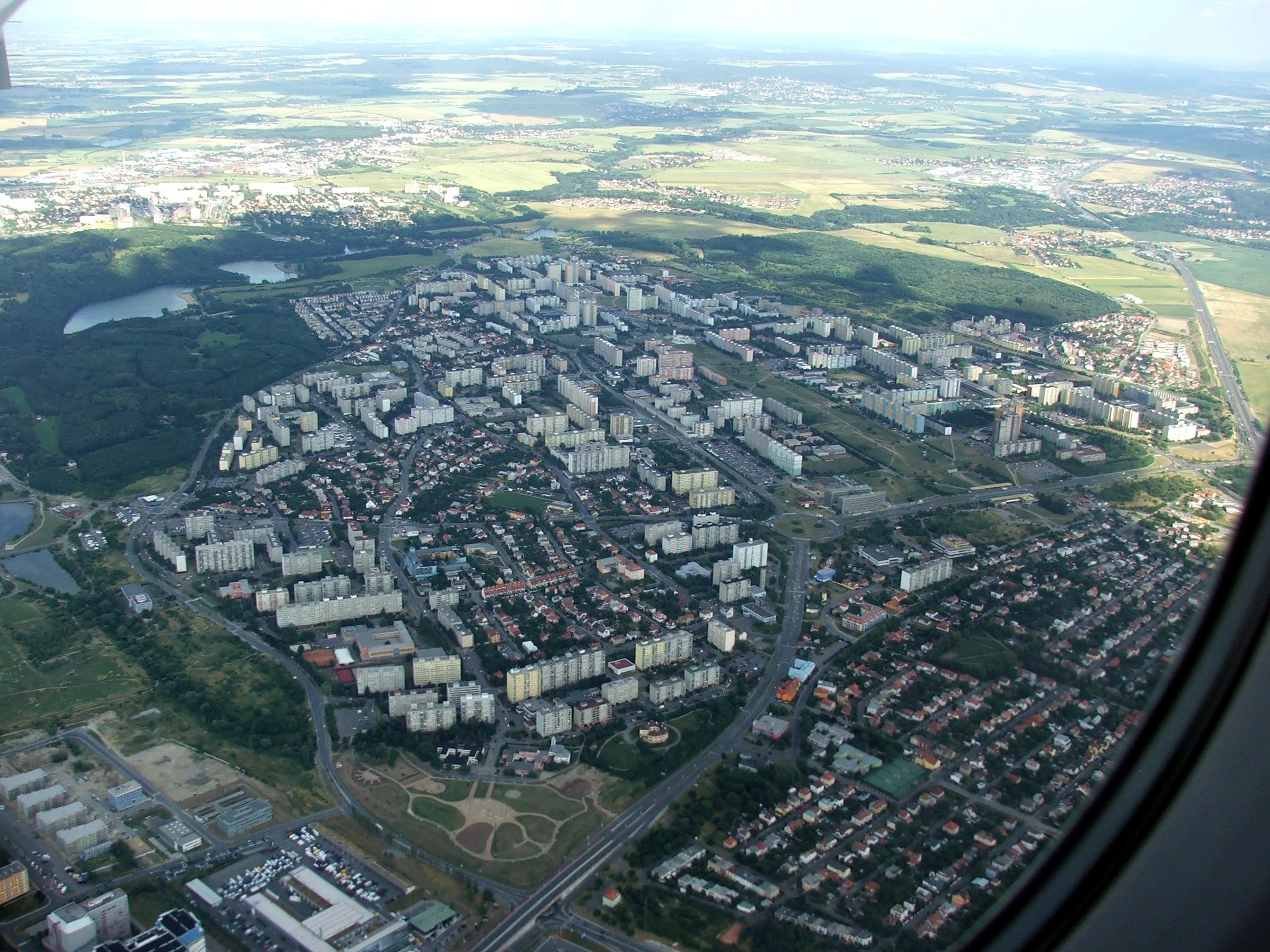
Aerial view of Jižní Město

Jižní Město (Czech pronunciation: [ˈjɪʒɲiː ˈmɲɛsto], colloquially Jižňák or Jižák and abbreviated JM) is a panel housing estate situated in an open area in the southeast of Prague. Its name translates from Czech to English as "South City" or "South Town". Home to most of the 90,000 inhabitants of the municipal district Prague 11, part of the Prague 4 administrative district, it is the largest housing estate in the Czech Republic. Large parts of Chodov and Háje, the two districts which belong to Prague 11, are part of Jižní Město. The natural areas Kunratický les and Hostivař Park Forest border the estate, on the west and east sides respectively. The D1 highway connecting Prague to Brno runs through the estate.

== History ==
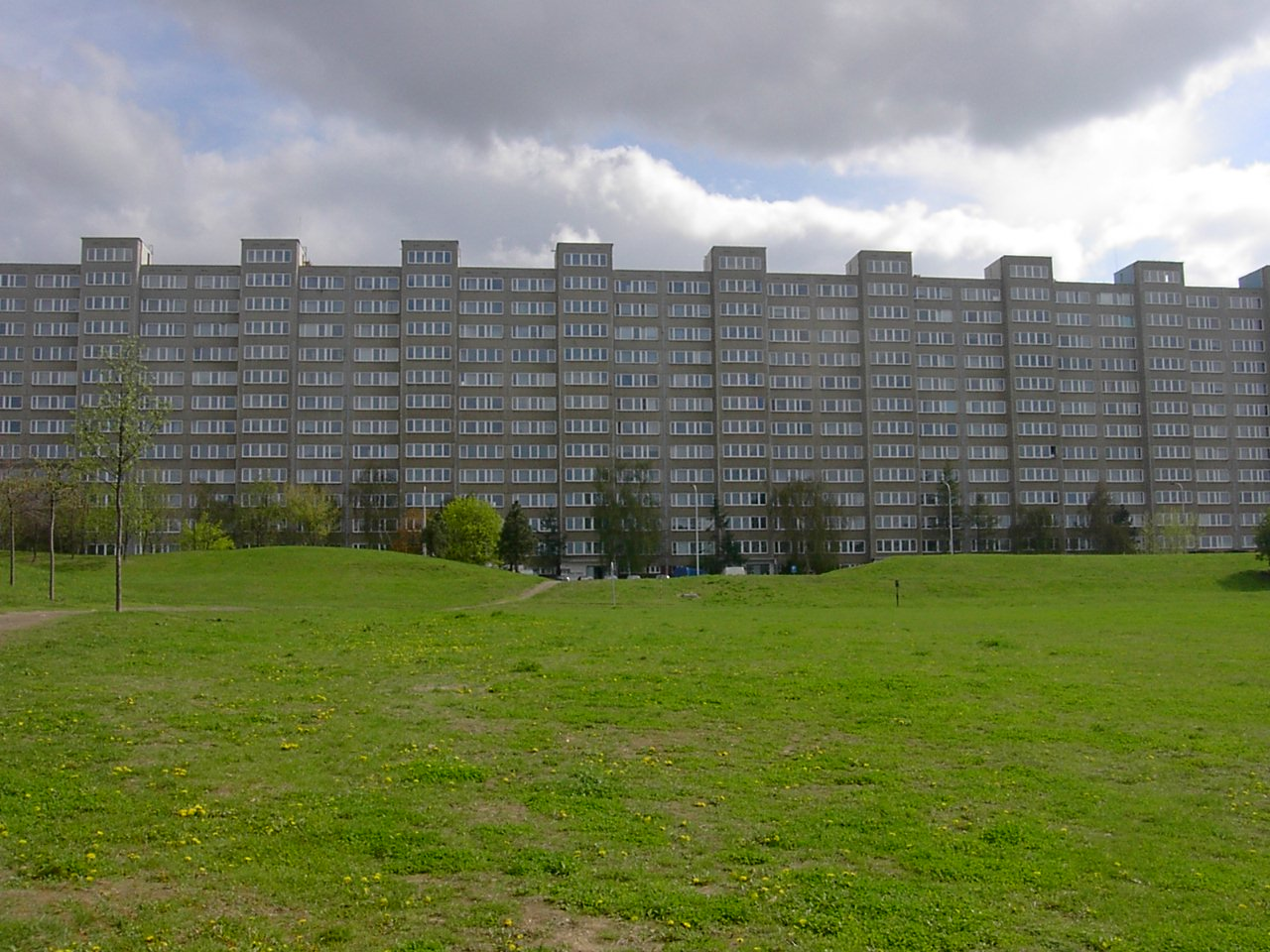
A panel building on Křejpského street in Sídliště JM I just before an exterior redecoration in 2006

The construction of the housing estate began as an extension to some new buildings constructed in Pankrác and Kačerov. The housing built was still not enough to satisfy the huge volume of workers, so at the beginning of the 1970s construction began on further blocks in an empty meadow between Chodov and Háje. This area, which makes up the largest part of the housing estate, was known as Sídliště Jižní Město I (Sídliště is the Czech word for an agglomeration of panel buildings). At the time when the flats began to be available to the Czechoslovak people, the construction was still not entirely finished, a reality documented in Věra Chytilová's 1979 documentary film Panelstory, which is set in Sídliště JM I during its teething stages. The situation slowly improved throughout the 1970s. The section of the D1 highway between Prague and Mirošovice opened on schedule in 1971, and energy supplies were successfully installed in time.

The next stage of the construction, Sídliště Jižní Město II, began in 1978, and was constructed entirely in Chodov in the area bordering with Kunratice. Sufficient public amenities were available as the second part of the state became available to the public. The buildings in Sídliště JM II were colour-coded to facilitate orientation. Their exterior was painted according to an artistic code devised by architects Zelený and Rothbauerová, which coloured different areas of the estate black, brown, red and green, an analogy to the traditional elements Sun, Water, Earth and Air. The last blocks were completed ten years later.

== Transport ==
Jižní Město is served by Roztyly, Chodov, Opatov and Háje stations, the final four stops on the southern end of Line C of the Prague Metro. The extension to the estate was opened on November 7, 1980, towards the end of the construction of Sídliště Jižní Město II. At that time there were only 50,000 inhabitants, and the new construction and improved transport links were expected to double the estate's population.

The D1 highway runs through the estate, beginning in Chodov. There is an intercity and international bus station at Roztyly.
