= FC Háje Jižní Město =

FC Háje
- Full name: FC Háje Jižní Město
- Founded: 1930
- Ground: K Jezeru 2 Prague 4 – Háje
- Manager: Josef Kostka
- League: 6. league, 1.A class, group A
- 2025–26: 3rd
Home colours

FC Háje Jižní Město is a Czech football club located in Prague-Háje. It currently plays in the Prague Championship, which is in the fifth tier of the Czech football system.
