= Újezd (Prague) =

Coordinates: 50°01′07″N 14°32′14″E

Újezd u Průhonic
- Cadastral Area of Prague
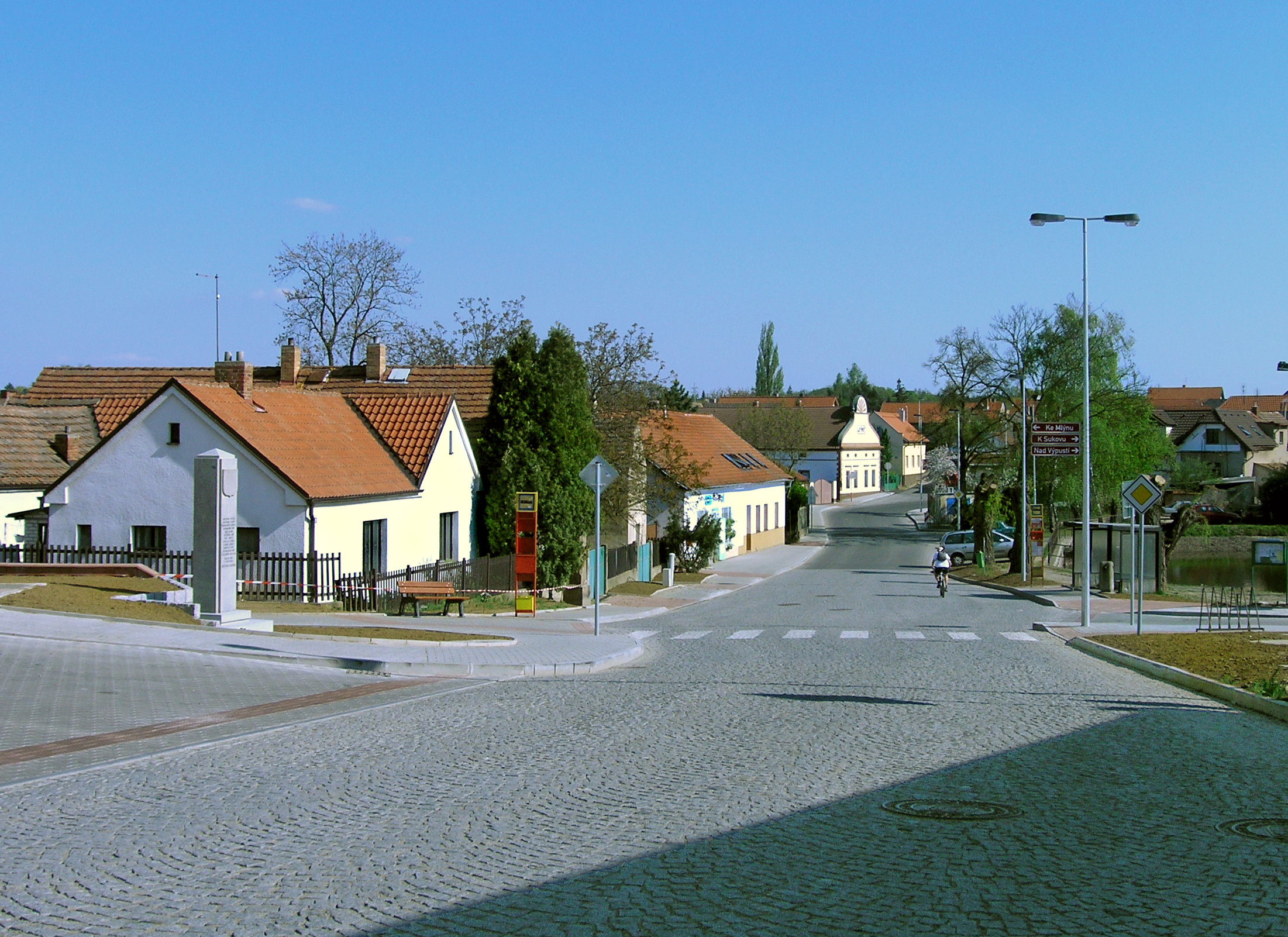
- Main street in Újezd

- Location of Malá Chuchle in Prague
- Country: Czech Republic
- Region: Prague
- District: Prague 4

Population (2011)
  - Total: 3,067
- Time zone: UTC+1 (CET)
  - Summer (DST): UTC+2 (CEST)

Újezd is a cadastral area of Prague, Czech Republic and one of its quarters. The cadastral area of Újezd is officially called Újezd u Průhonic, while the municipality (městská část) is officially called Praha-Újezd. It is part of the district of Prague 4 and of the administrative district of Prague 11.

The area itself consists of two settlements:

- Újezd, a smaller village.
- Kateřinky, in the northwestern part of the cadastral area. Around 85% of the population of the cadastral area lives there. It lies very close to the large housing estate of Jižní Město.
