= Prague 11 =

Prague 11 Praha 11
- Municipal District of Prague; Administrative District of Prague
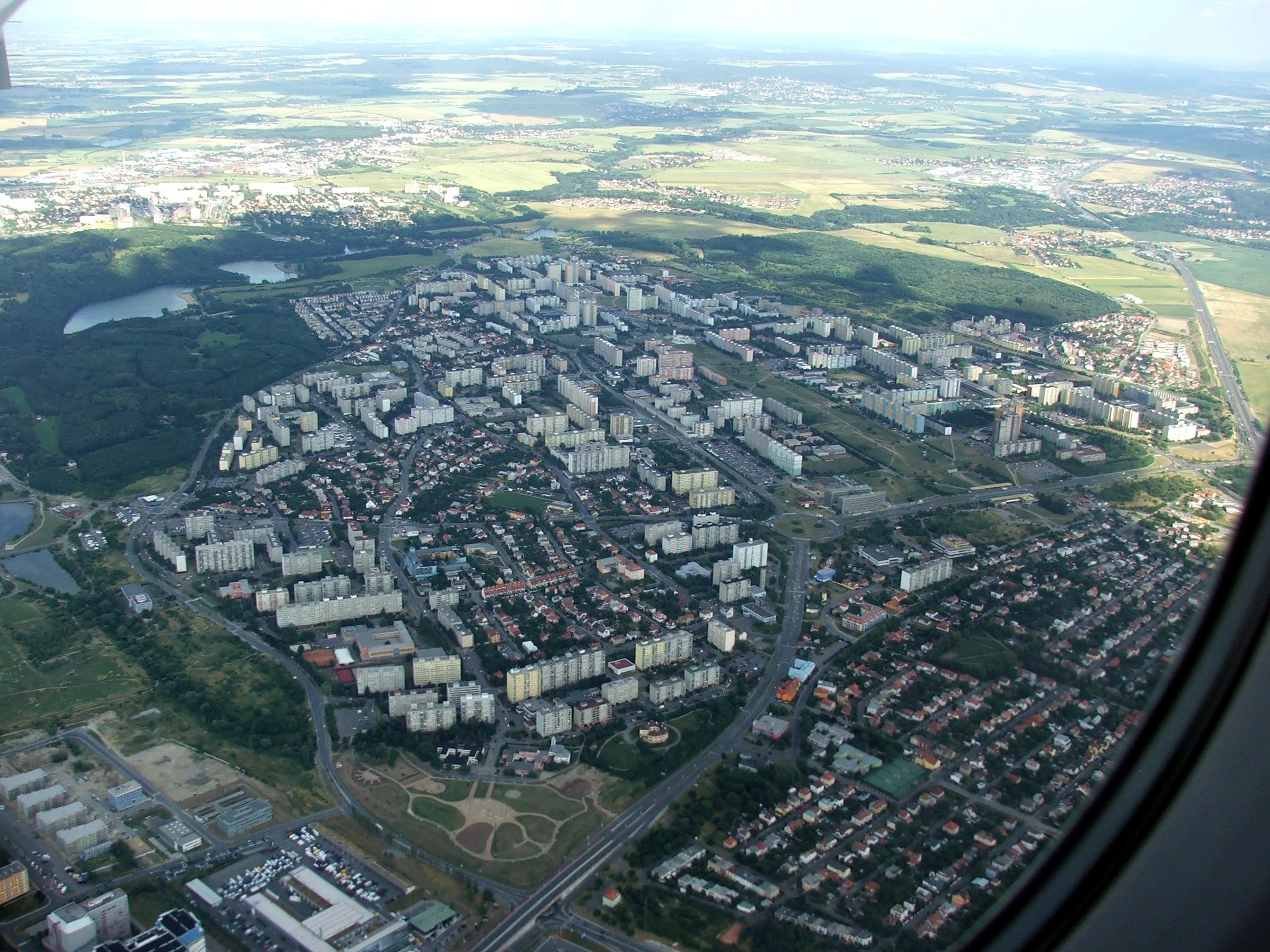
- Aerial view of Jižní Město

- Flag Coat of arms

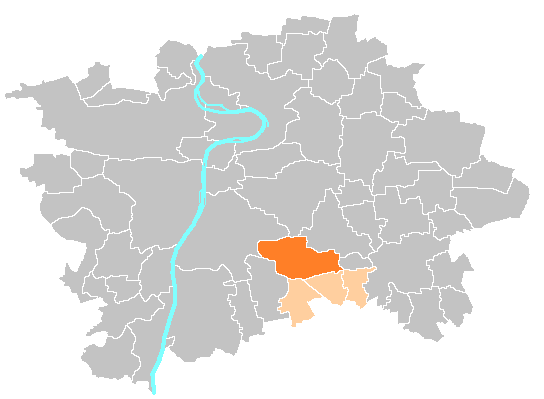
- Location of Prague 11 in Prague
- Coordinates: 50°1′43″N 14°31′54″E
- Country: Czech Republic
- Region: Prague

Government
  - Mayor: Ing. Martin Sedeke (ODS)

Area
  - Total: 9.80 km^{2} (3.78 sq mi)

Population (2021)
  - Total: 72,102
  - Density: 7,360/km^{2} (19,100/sq mi)
- Time zone: UTC+1 (CET)
  - Summer (DST): UTC+2 (CEST)
- Postal code: 148 00, 149 00
- Website: http://www.praha11.cz/en/

Prague 11 is a municipal district (městská část) in Prague, Czech Republic. It is located in the south eastern part, 8 km from the City Center.

The district is split into two parts, mainly from the perspective of pedestrians, by the south-eastern highway to Brno. Praha 11 comprises Chodov, Opatov and Háje on one side and Roztyly on the other side.

Praha 11 is mostly residential district because of the huge panel housing estate called Jižní Město. At the beginning of 2016, it had 77,175 inhabitants. With the city centre it is connected by metro line C.

The administrative district (správní obvod) of the same name consists of municipal districts Prague 11, Křeslice, Šeberov and Újezd.

== Demographics ==
Historical population
Year	Pop.	±%
1869	772	—
1880	800	+3.6%
1890	861	+7.6%
1900	999	+16.0%
1910	1,128	+12.9%
1921	1,016	−9.9%
1930	2,132	+109.8%
1950	4,913	+130.4%
1961	5,310	+8.1%
1970	5,111	−3.7%
1980	59,625	+1066.6%
1991	86,425	+44.9%
2001	81,245	−6.0%
2011	75,741	−6.8%
2021	72,102	−4.8%
Source: Censuses

== See also ==
- Districts of Prague#Symbols
