= Blue Bower =

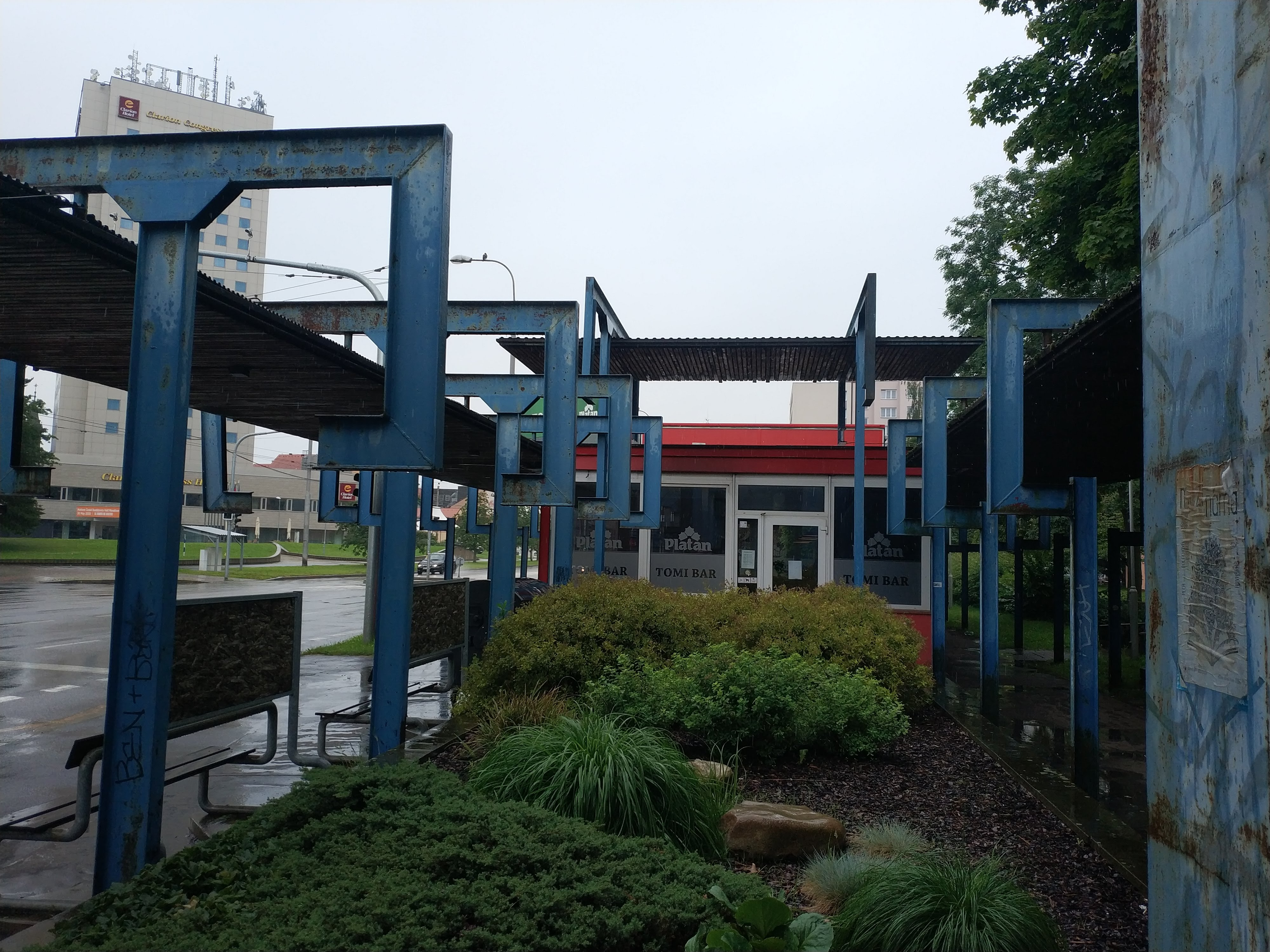
Part of the sheds with a green parterre

Blue Bower (also referred to as promenade, parade or sheds) is a steel structure covering one part of Pražská třída Street in České Budějovice, the Czech Republic. It was established in connection with the construction of today's Prague housing estate. It was built in 1975 according to the designs of architects Alois Hloušek and Ladislav Konopka. It is unique not only in its scope but also in its artistic value. It consists of blue steel columns in the shape of the letter I with garlands and a flat roof lined with wooden slats. At the beginning of 2020, it was decided to demolish it, which happened during the summer holidays.

== Description ==
Bower is located on the left side of Pražská třída Street in the direction from the center. It starts opposite the Clarion Congress Hotel (formerly called Gomel) and continues north to Puklicova Street. The basin is made of steel beams, painted in deep blue, and a roof lined with wooden slats. It is divided into several segments with different shapes and heights. A large part consists of two parallel covered promenades with an open space between them, which is planted with greenery, or there are low buildings with shops and services. The beams have the form of the letter I and, in addition to the supporting function of the roof, they also have a decorative function. It is in the form of garlands, i.e. at right angles to the welded I profiles, which twist back down from the roof. In the place of the bus stop Družba - IGY, the inner uncovered space is missing. The promenade is covered here in its entirety. The I-shaped beams are replaced by solid beams and the ceiling is formed by pyramids with the top facing upwards. The lining is wooden. This part is elevated.

=== Surroundings and context of construction ===
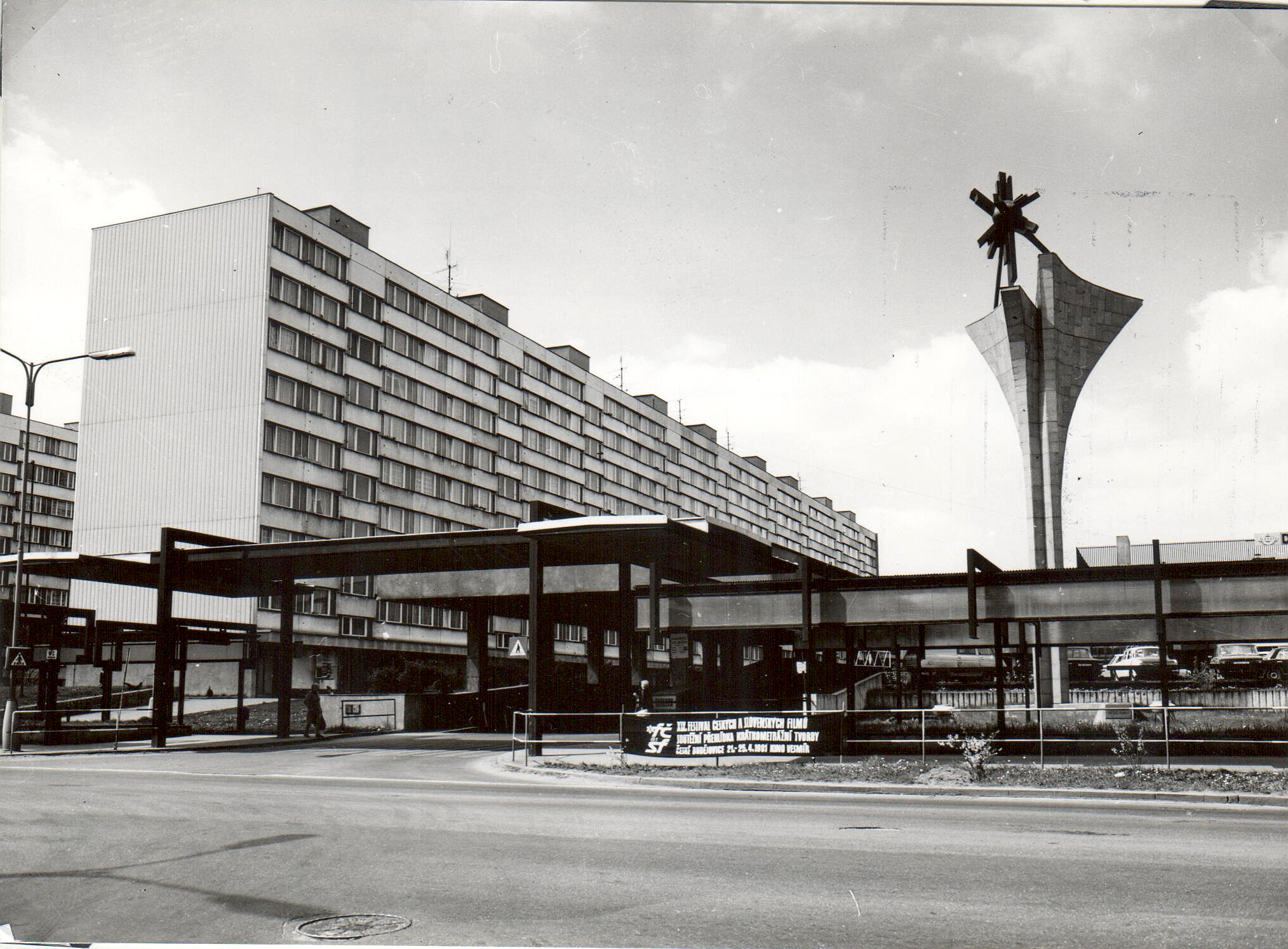
The promenade by Družba department store in 1981. A monument to the Paris Commune by Zdeněk Vojta stands out from behind

In front of the promenade is the street itself, behind it the residential panel houses and the original Družba department store, in front of which stands a massive reinforced concrete pylon lined with basalt, on the extended top of which is a star sculpture symbolizing the events of the Paris Commune. The promenade was conceived as a covered public space offering various shops and services, connecting a shopping center, residential houses, and a bus stop, and was created at the same time as the entire Prague housing estate.

== History ==
While the houses of the housing estate were built as early as the 1960s, the promenade was completed in 1975. The authors were Alois Hlouška and Ladislav Konopka. Over time, the pyramids with the tip down and the lighting, which were located in the part near the bus stop, disappeared.

=== Demolition plan ===
In 2020, the discussion on the future of the promenade culminated. While at the end of 2019 the city signaled that it would reconstruct the promenade, at the beginning of 2020 it announced that it had approved the demolition. Demolition began in early July 2020 and ended in late August. Its price could climb to 1.9 million Czech crowns (almost 71,000 EUR or US$79,680), while the repair of the promenade would, according to an earlier assessment, cost 18 million (672,500 EUR or US$755,000). Opposition to demolition has risen in professional circles. The petition was first initiated by architects Antonín Kryl, Jaromír Srba and J. Novák, joined by local citizens, then an open letter was sent to the town hall, initiated by experts in the architecture of the period.

== Gallery ==
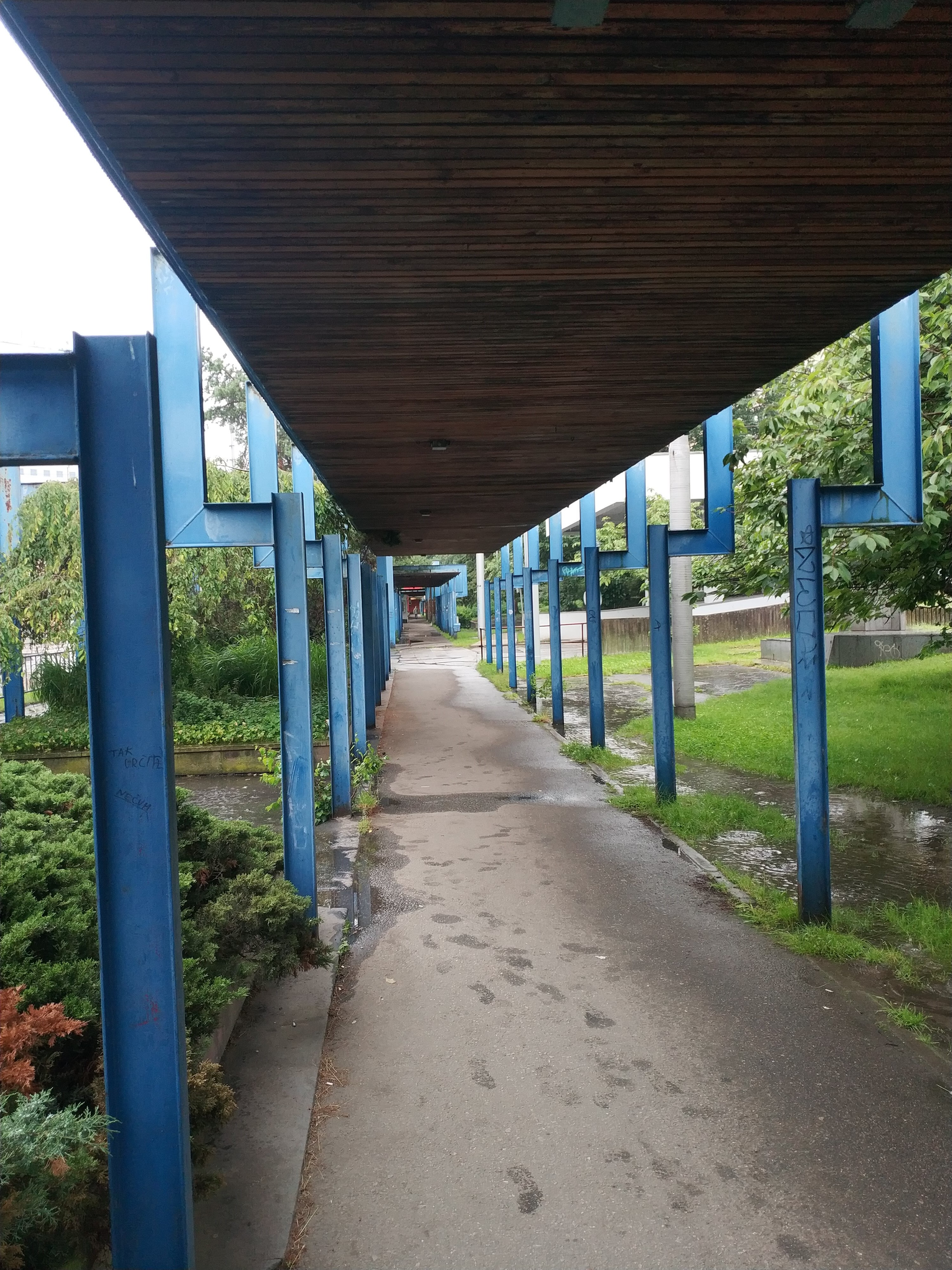
One part of the bower

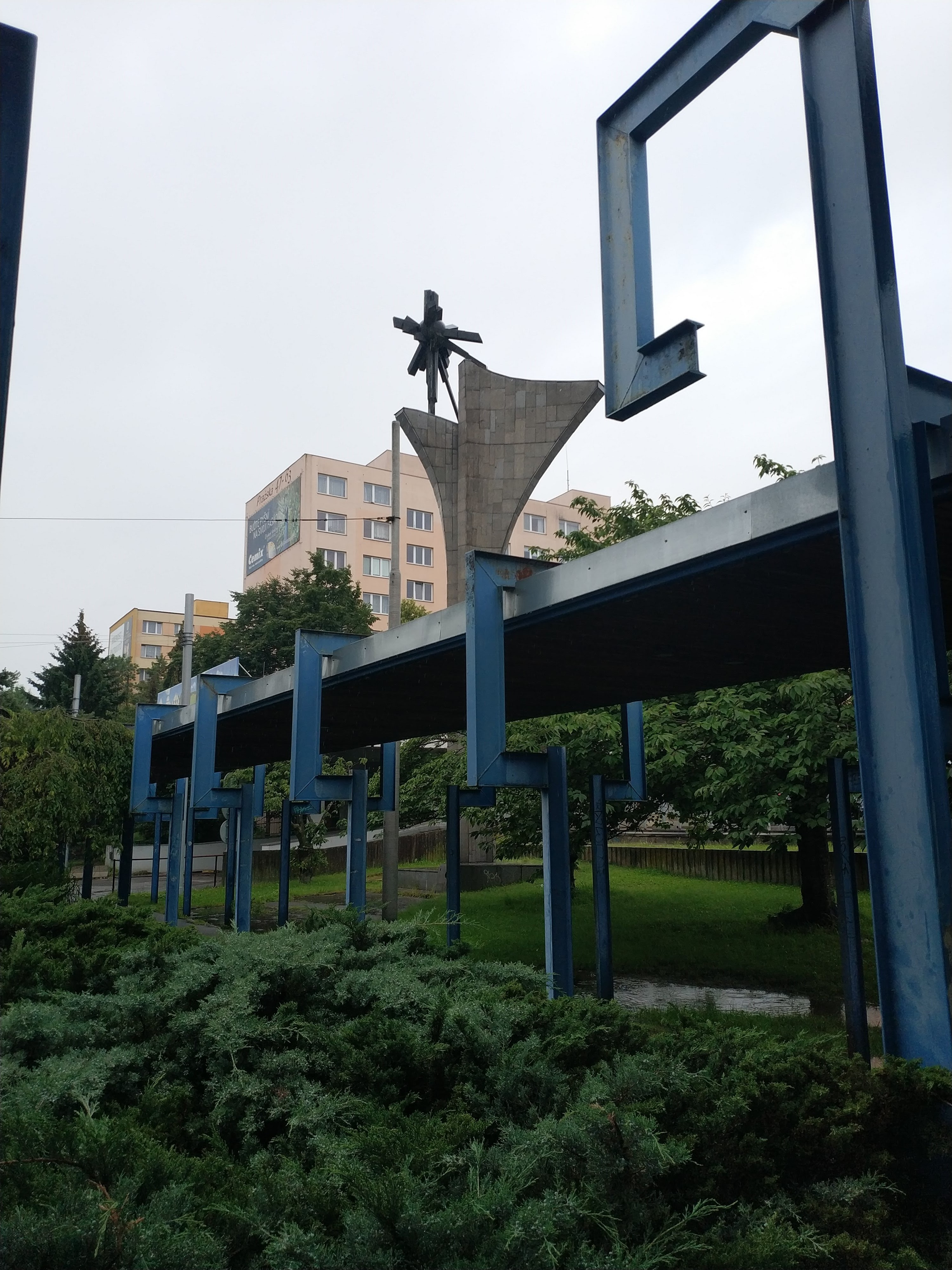
View from the green parterre in the middle

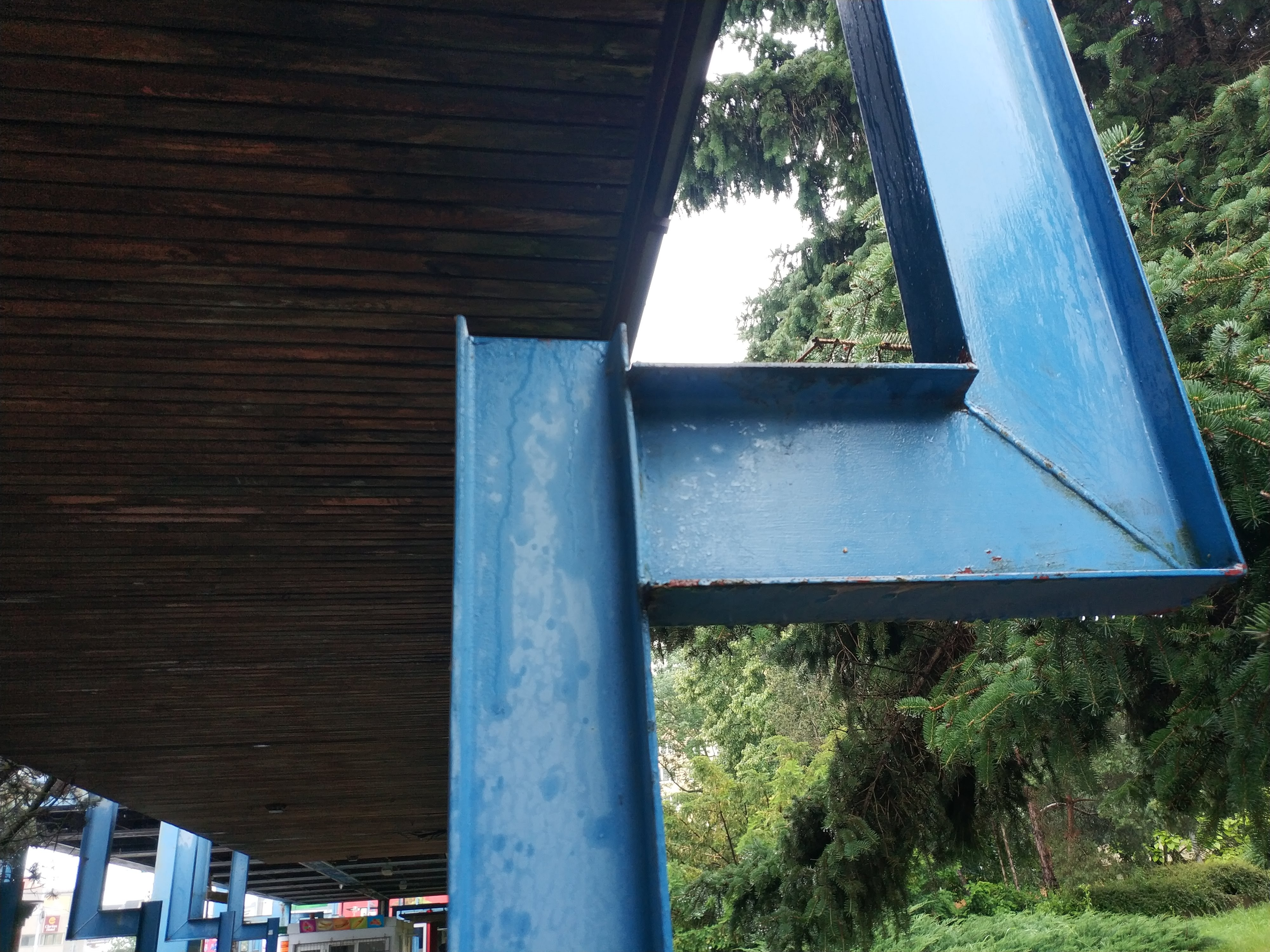
Detail of the supporting and decorative beam

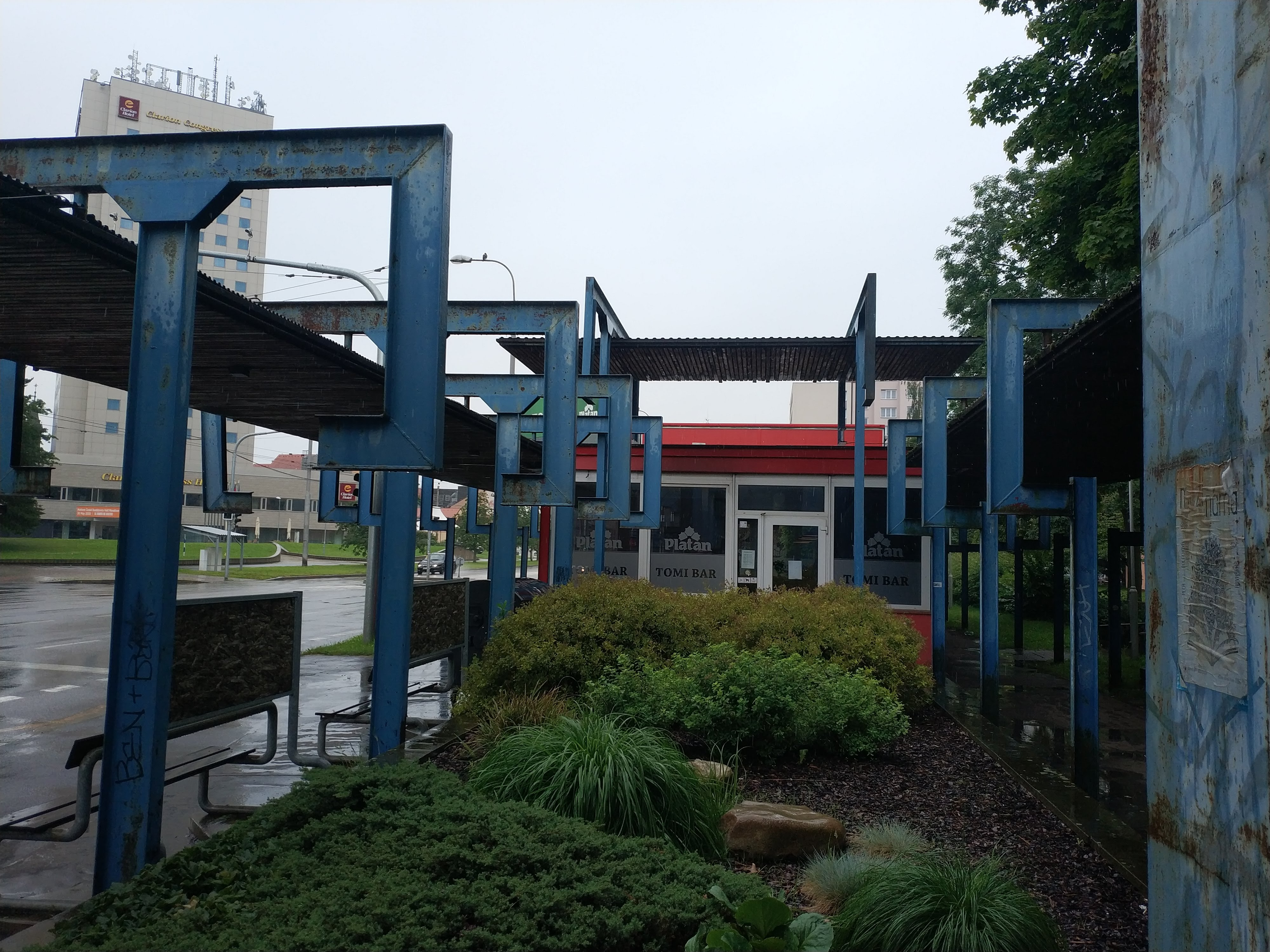
View of both parts and the elevated segment of the ground floor building

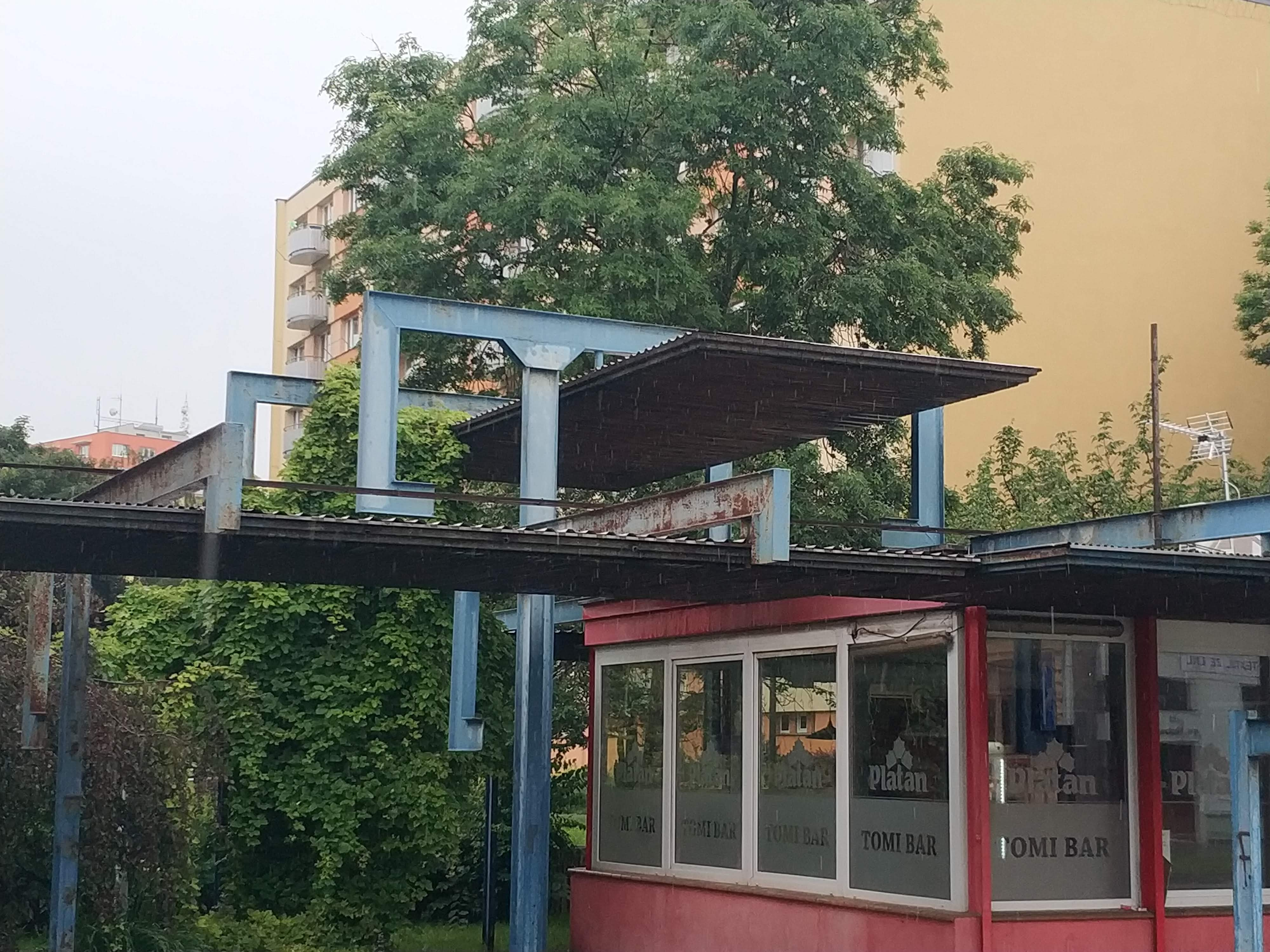
The elevated segment from the distance

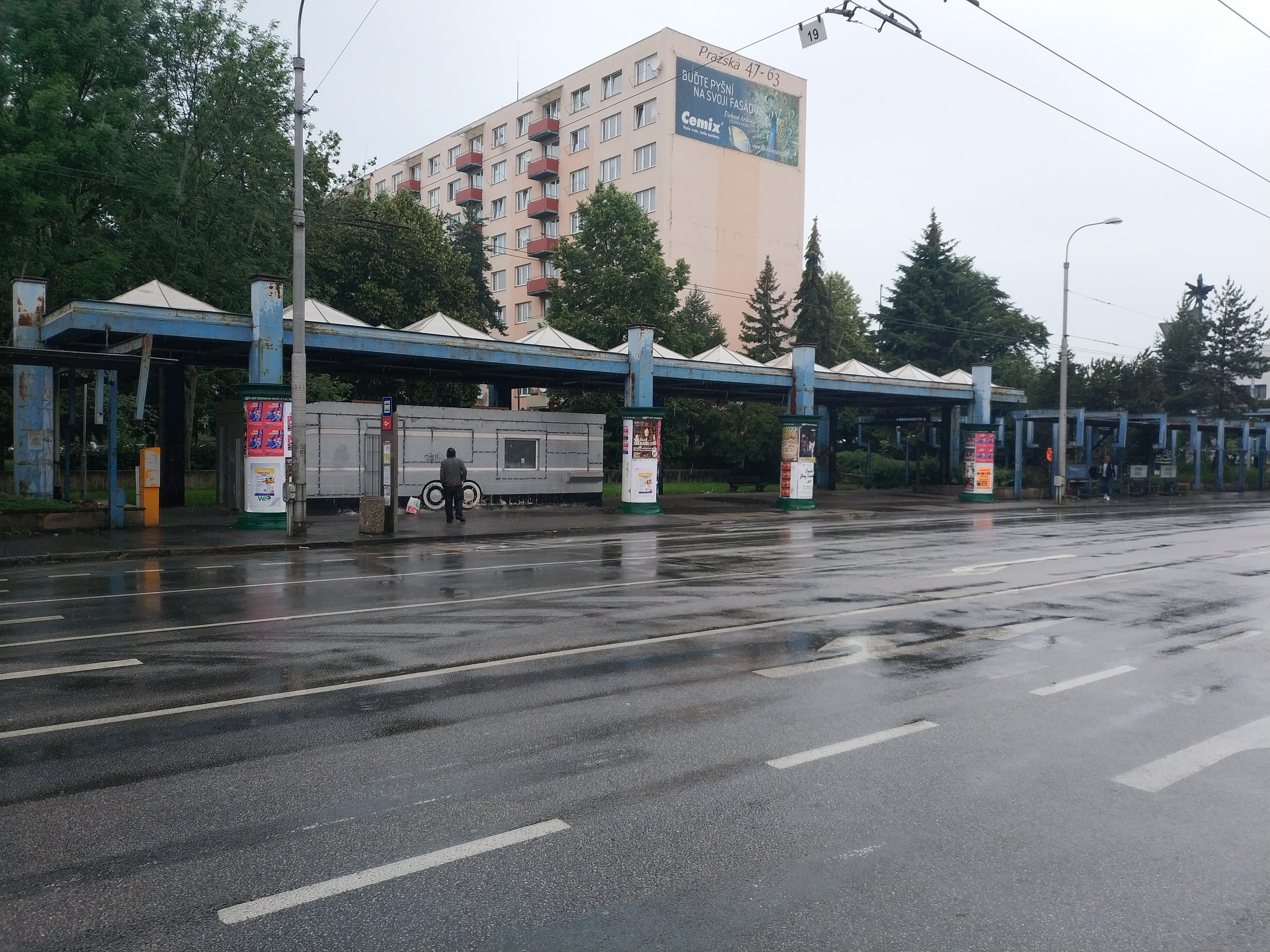
A different part at the bus stop with pyramidal roofs

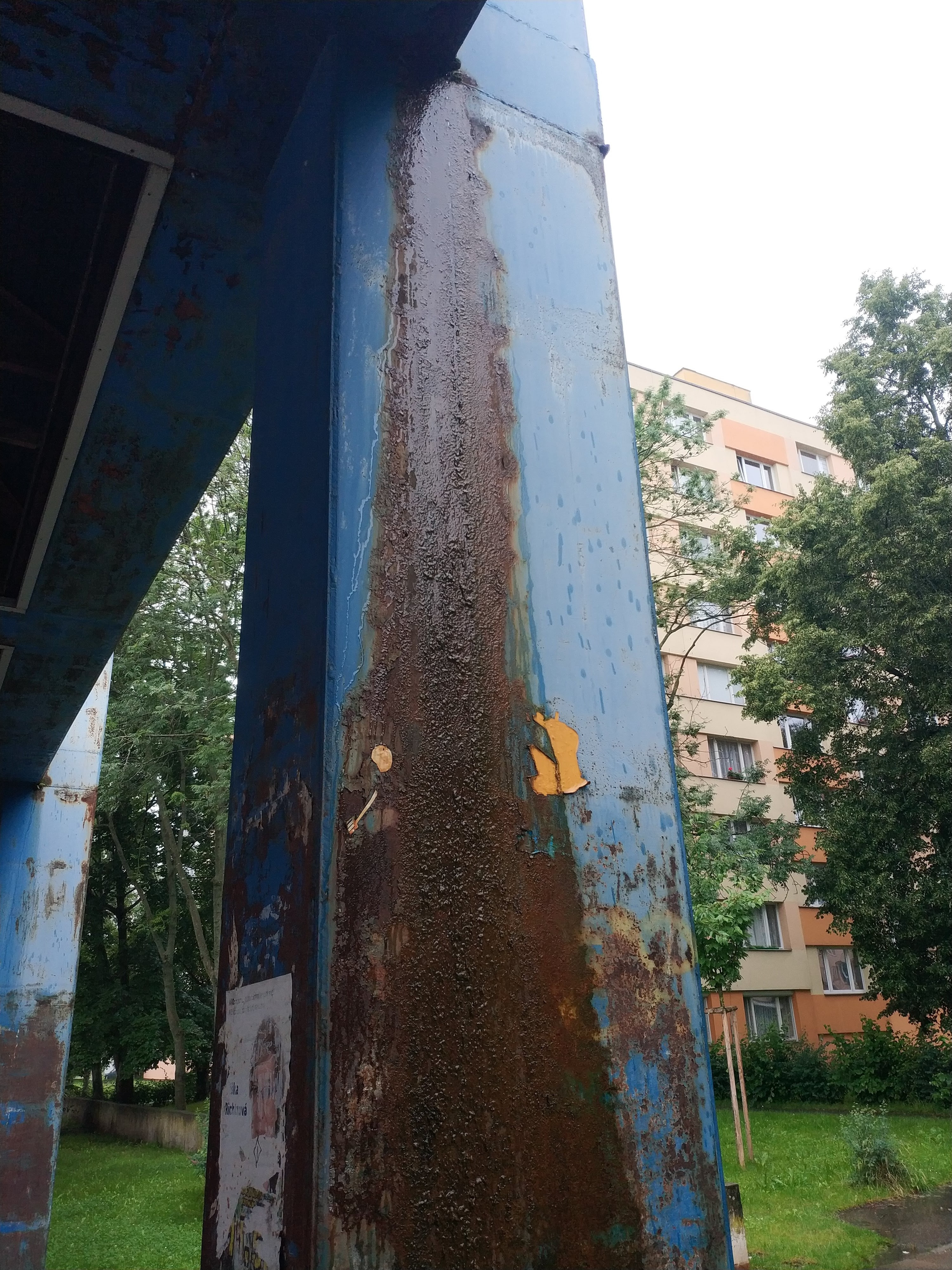
Running water on a rusty beam (June 2020)
