= Háje (Prague) =

- Cadastral Area of Prague
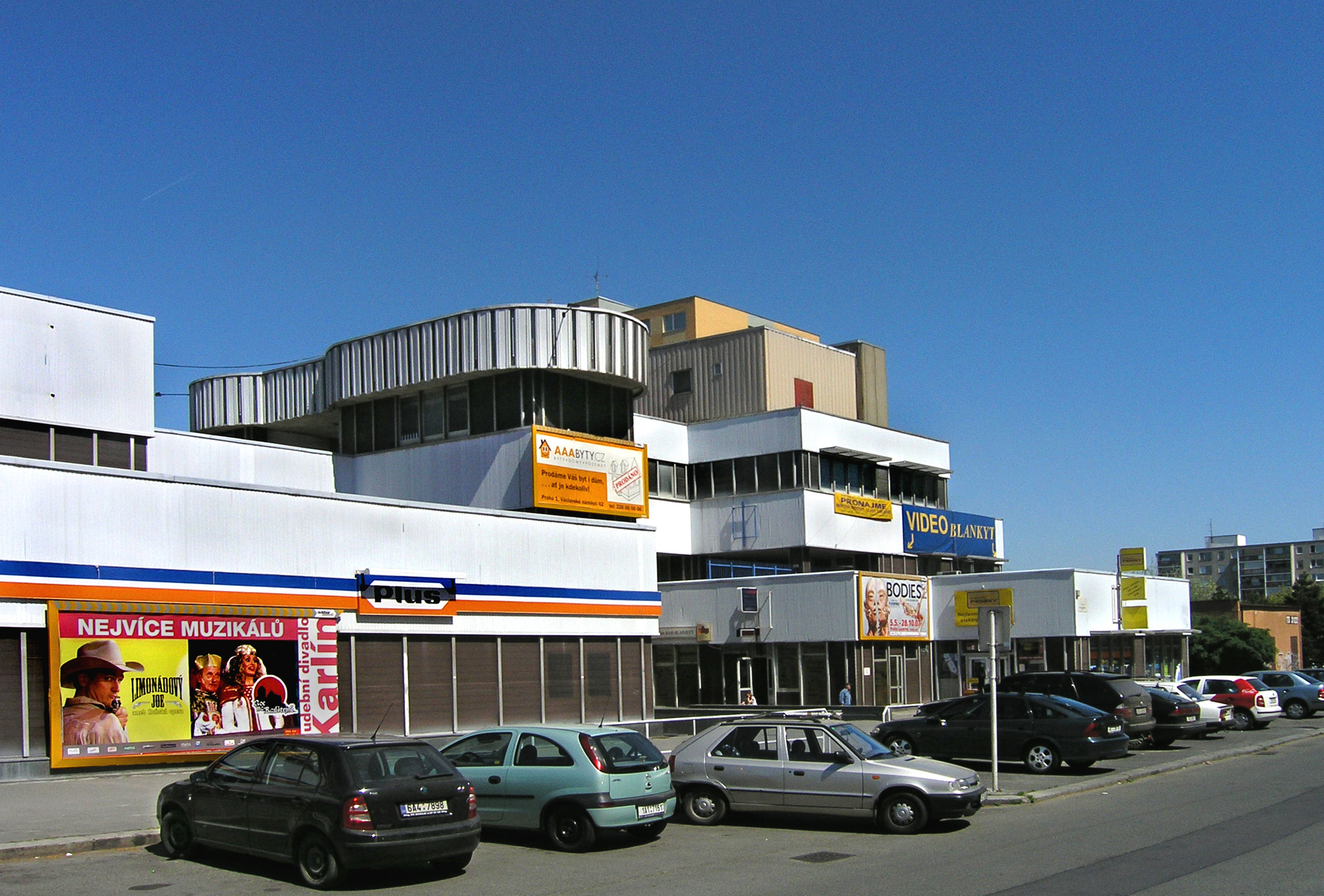
- Blankyt shopping center

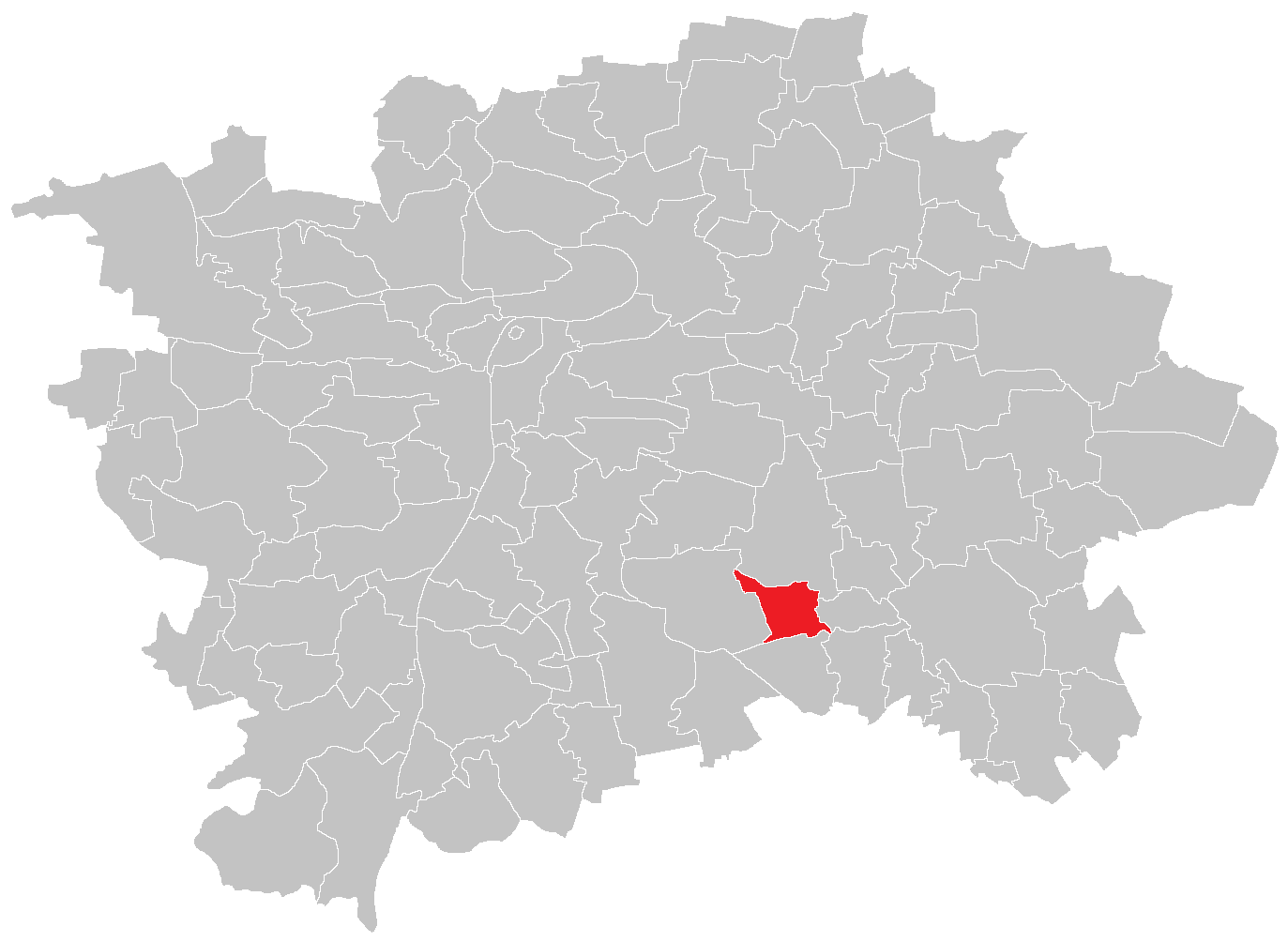
- Location of Háje in Prague
- Coordinates: 50°01′57″N 14°32′02″E
- Country: Czech Republic
- Region: Prague
- District: Prague 11

Area
  - Total: 2.36 km^{2} (0.91 sq mi)

Population (2021)
  - Total: 22,059
  - Density: 9,350/km^{2} (24,200/sq mi)
- Time zone: UTC+1 (CET)
  - Summer (DST): UTC+2 (CEST)
- Postal code: 149 00

Háje is a district and cadastral area of Prague, capital of the Czech Republic, part of the municipal district of Prague 11.

Its area is 2.36 square kilometres (0.91 sq mi), its population is 22,059 and its population density is 9,300 inhabitants / km^{2}.

There is one metro station in Háje, the name of this station is Háje (Line C).

== History ==
Háje was founded in 18th century and historically it was part of Hostivař. Háje became part of Prague in 1968. The building of Jižní Město (South Town in English), the biggest housing estate in the Czech republic started in Háje in 1971. Most of the old village was demolished and replaced by panel buildings (paneláky).

== Demographics ==
Historical population

Year	Pop.	±%
1869	176	—
1880	179	+1.7%
1890	157	−12.3%
1900	198	+26.1%
1910	219	+10.6%

Year	Pop.	±%
1921	226	+3.2%
1930	337	+49.1%
1950	677	+100.9%
1961	797	+17.7%
1970	762	−4.4%

Year	Pop.	±%
1980	26,621	+3393.6%
1991	25,903	−2.7%
2001	23,105	−10.8%
2011	21,206	−8.2%
2021	22,059	+4.0%

Source: Censuses
