= Bohnice =

District of Prague, Czechia

- Cadastral Area of Prague
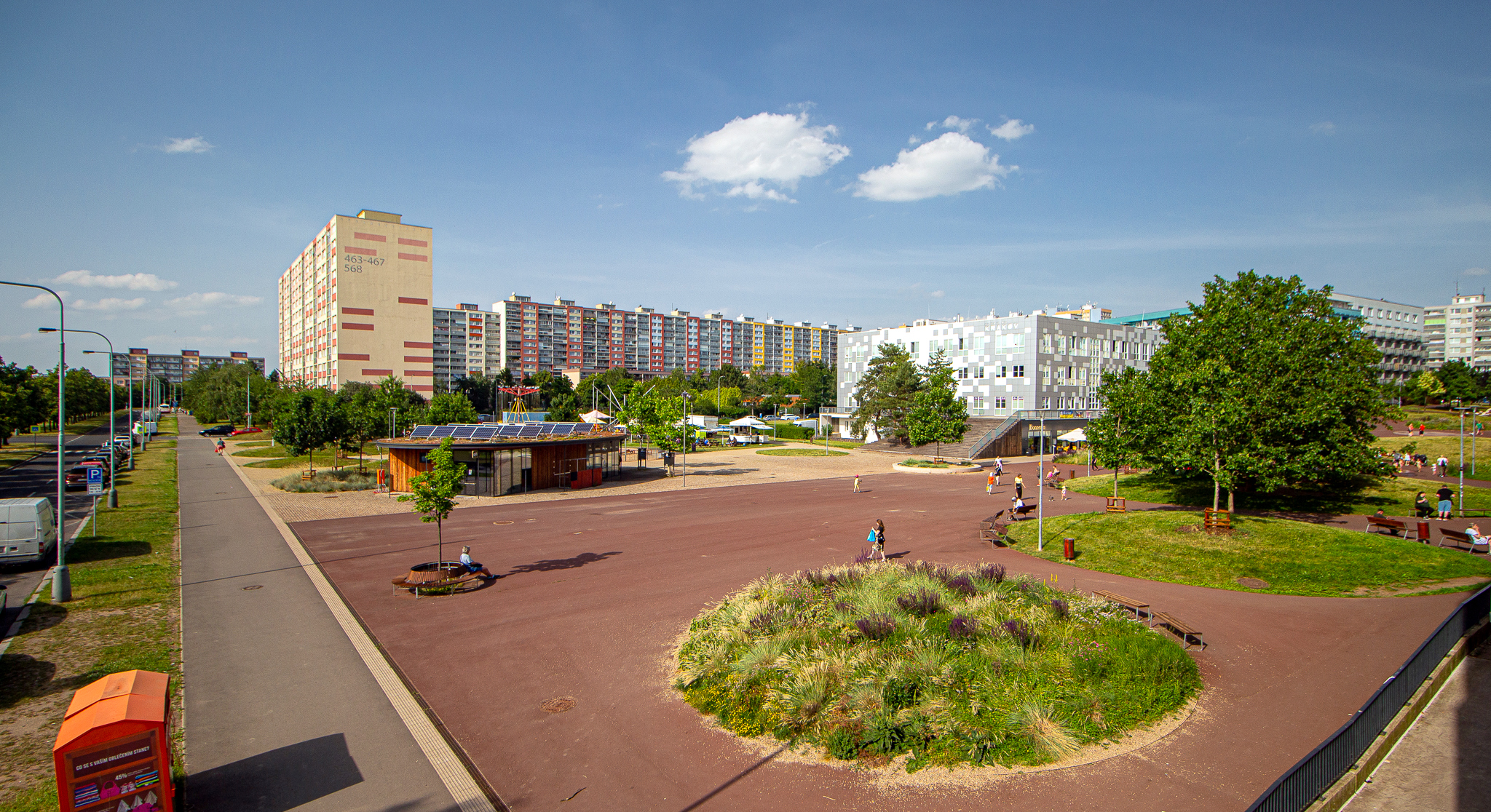
- Tenement buildings in Bohnice

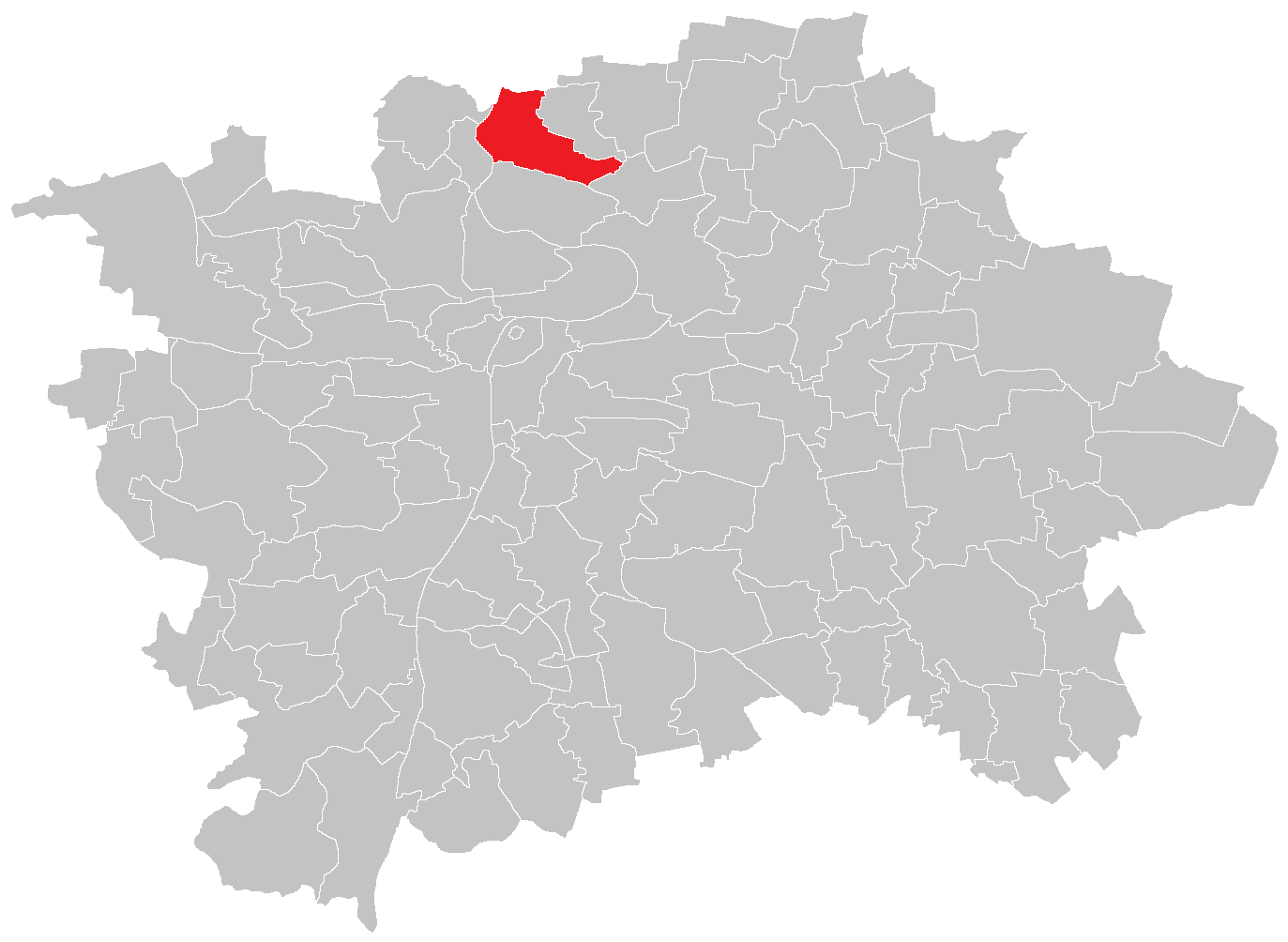
- Location of Bohnice in Prague
- Coordinates: 50°7′53″N 14°24′39″E
- Country: Czechia
- Region: Prague
- District: Prague 8

Area
  - Total: 4.66 km^{2} (1.80 sq mi)

Population (2021)
  - Total: 16,444
  - Density: 3,530/km^{2} (9,140/sq mi)
- Time zone: UTC+1 (CET)
  - Summer (DST): UTC+2 (CEST)
- Postal code: 181 00

Bohnice (Czech pronunciation: [ˈboɦɲɪtsɛ]) is a cadastral district in Prague 8, Czechia, some 5 km north of the city centre. It is home to a psychiatric hospital and a large tenement housing estate in which all the streets are named after cities or regions of Poland.

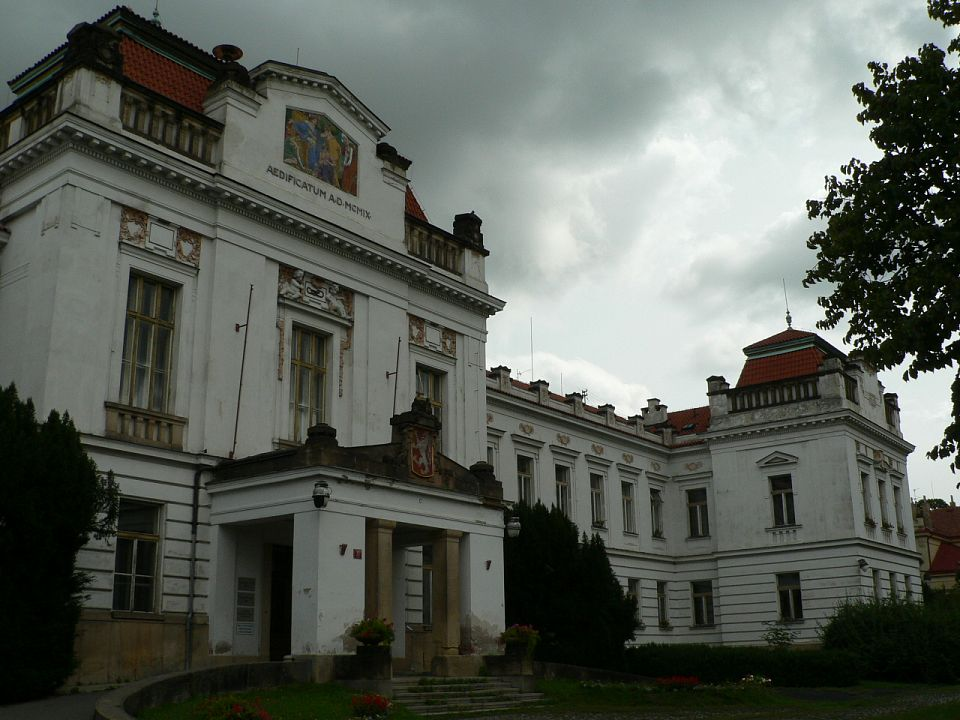
Psychiatric hospital – administrative building with main entrance

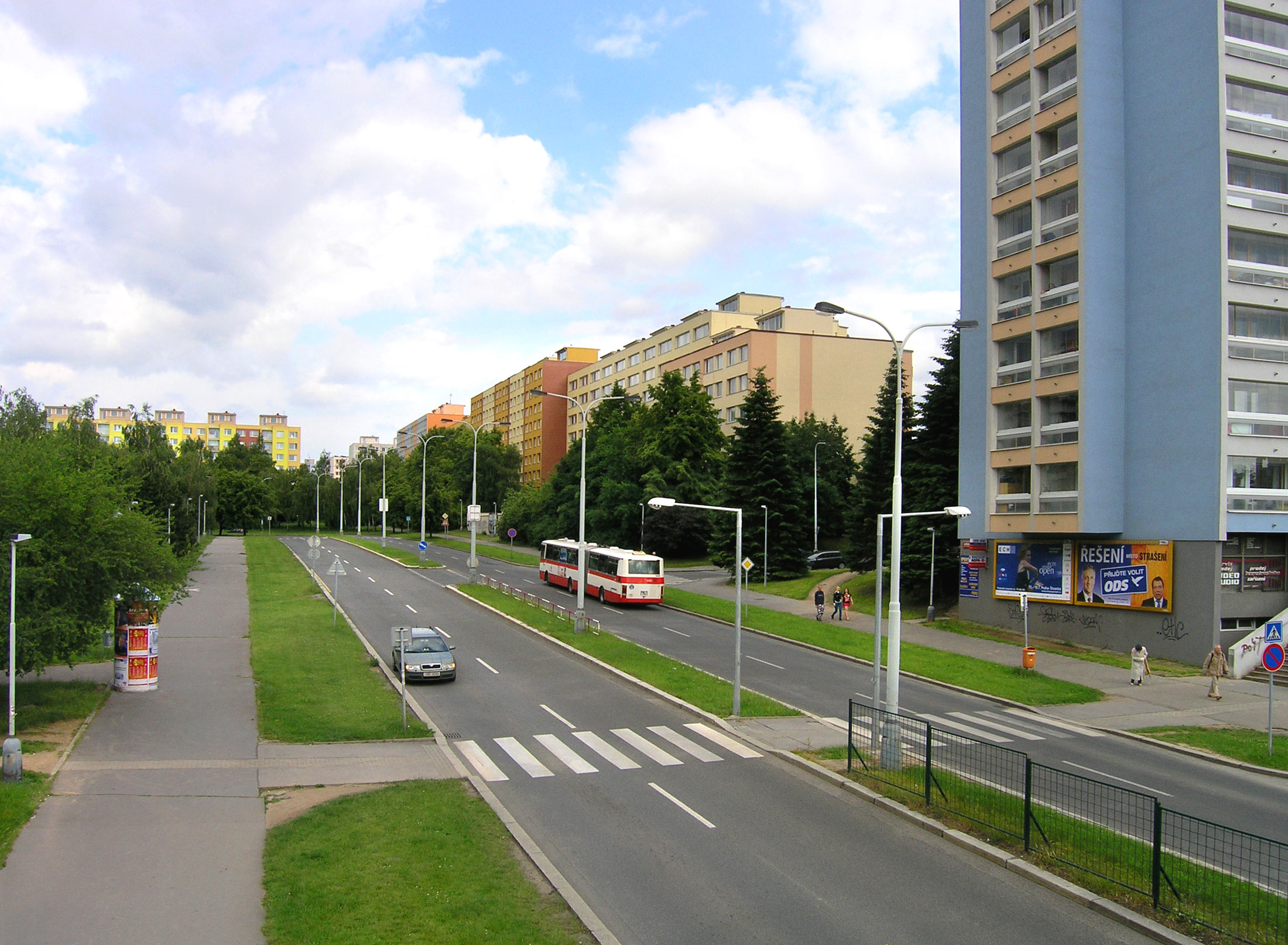
Lodžská (Łódź) Street; names of Polish cities and rivers prevail in the housing estate.

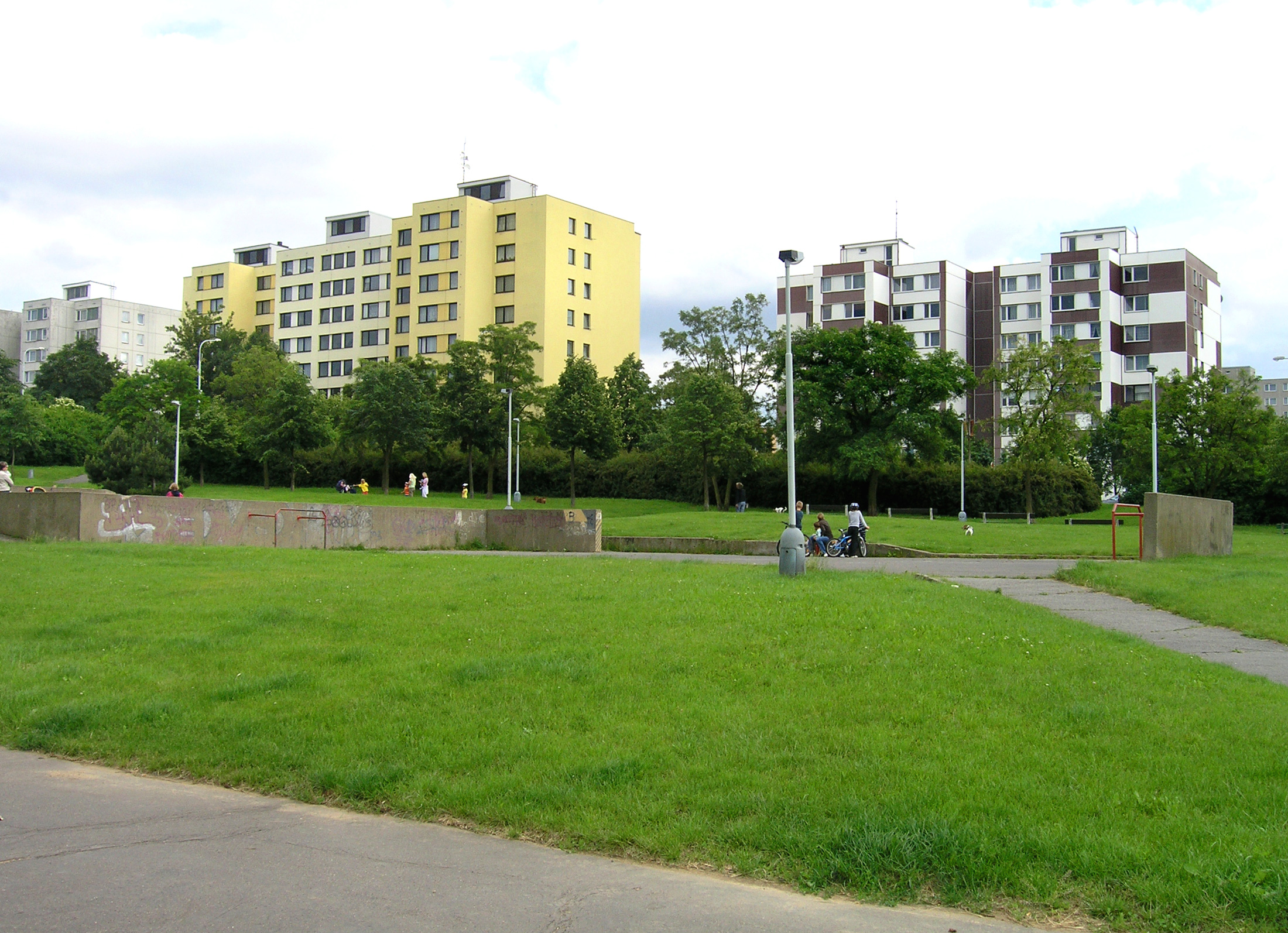
Krosenská (Krosno) Street

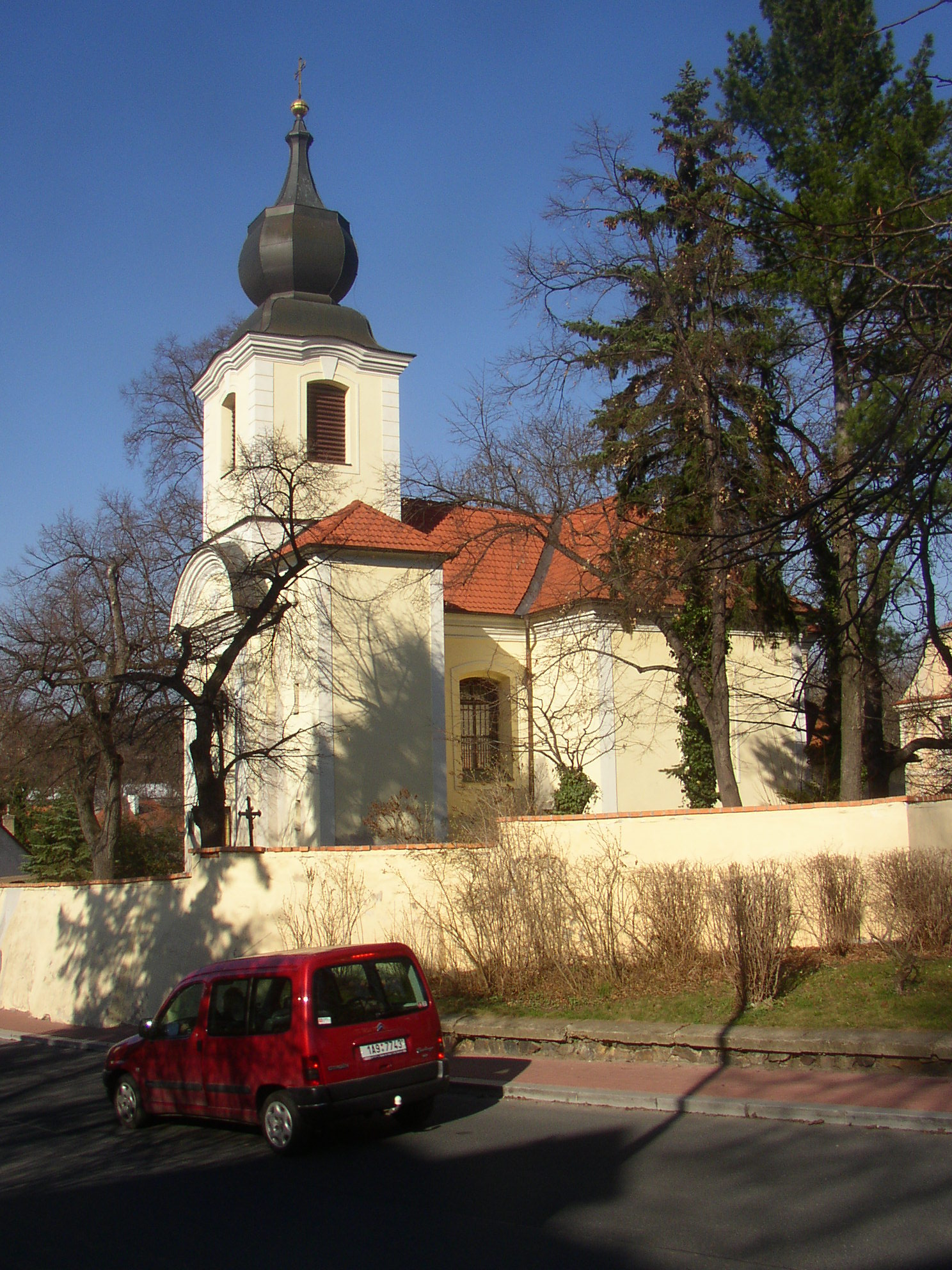
Saints Peter and Paul Church in the old part of Bohnice, consecrated in 1158.

== Demographics ==
Historical population

Year	Pop.	±%
1869	385	—
1880	424	+10.1%
1890	548	+29.2%
1900	679	+23.9%
1910	2,264	+233.4%

Year	Pop.	±%
1921	3,150	+39.1%
1930	4,797	+52.3%
1950	4,586	−4.4%
1961	2,704	−41.0%
1970	1,908	−29.4%

Year	Pop.	±%
1980	20,561	+977.6%
1991	20,395	−0.8%
2001	18,834	−7.7%
2011	17,416	−7.5%
2021	16,444	−5.6%

Source: Censuses
