= Kunratický les =

Forest in Prague

Coordinates: 50°01′30″N 14°28′20″E

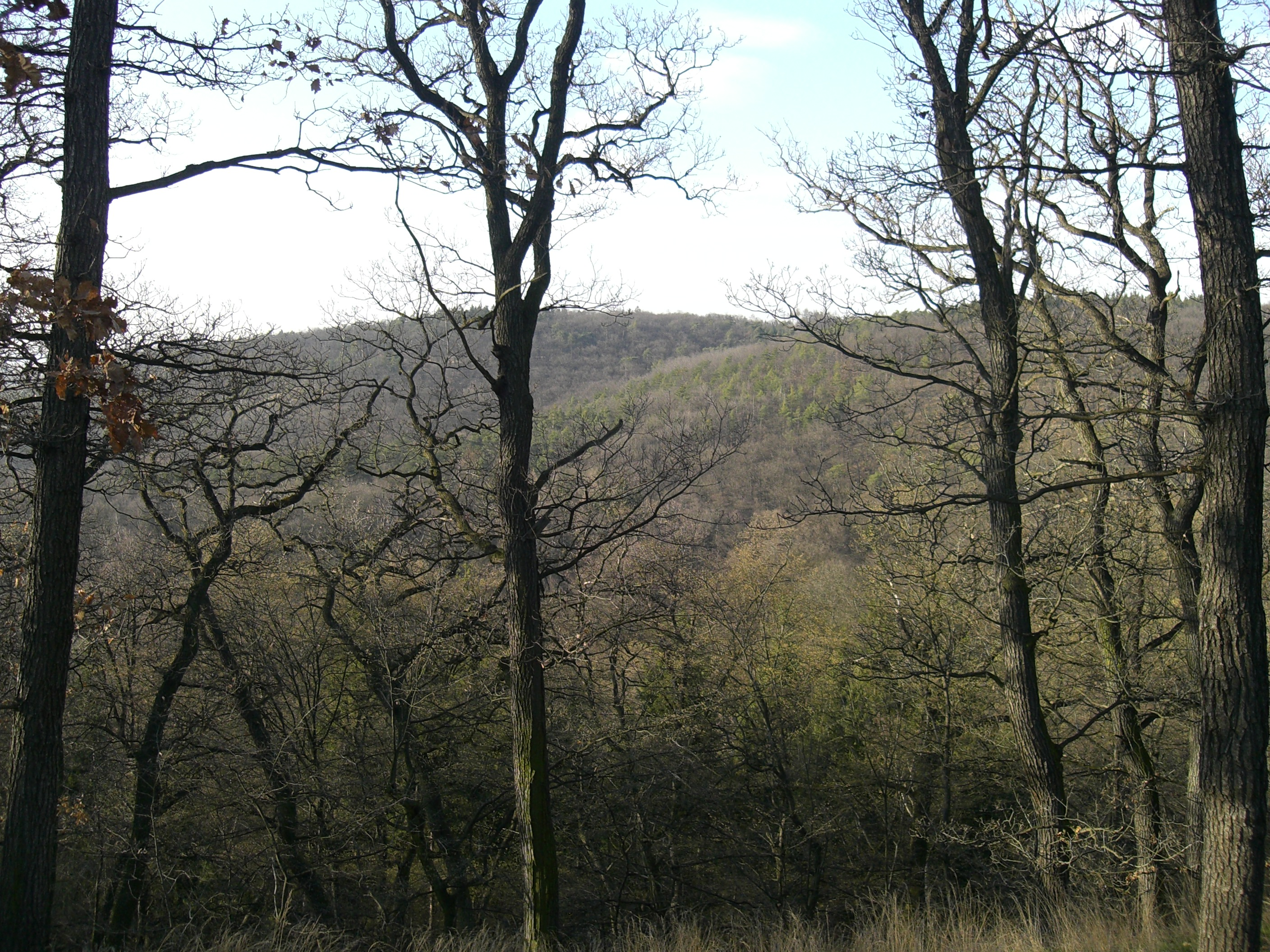
Panoramic view from Nový hrad u Kunratic.

Kunratický les is a forested area of three square kilometres in Prague. It is located in Kunratice district. The forest is separated from other forested areas by urban settlements.

Kunratický les is visited by 678,000 people per year who use the forest for recreation, sports activities (running, cycling, etc.) or tourism.
