= Prague 4 =

Prague 4 Praha 4
- Municipal District of Prague; Administrative District of Prague
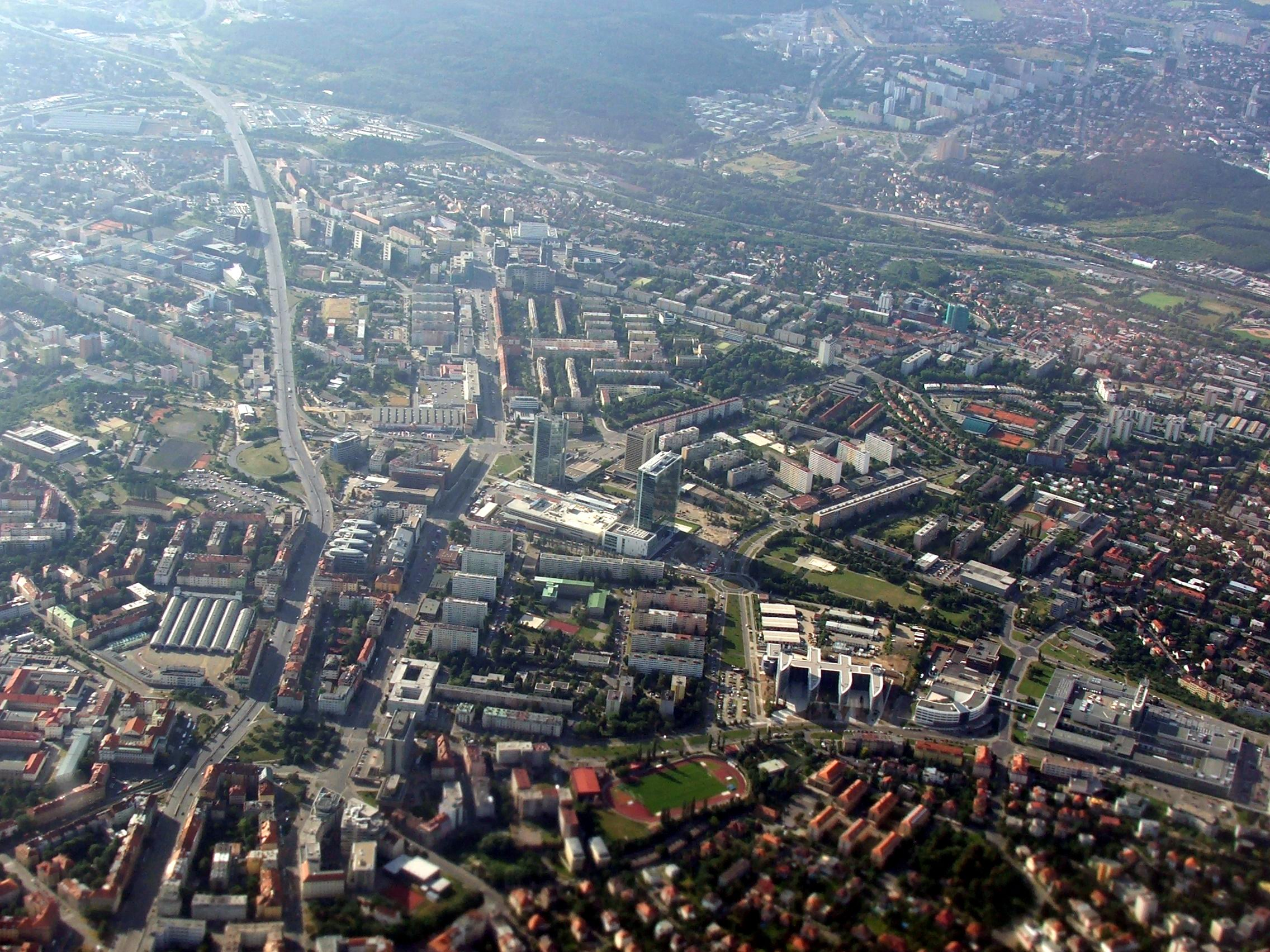
- Aerial view of Pankrác

- Flag Coat of arms

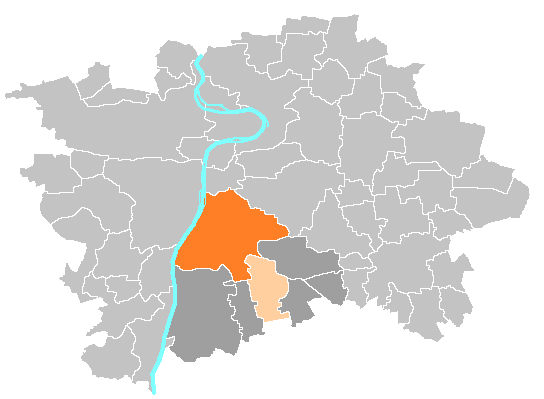
- Location of Prague 4 in Prague
- Coordinates: 50°3′44″N 14°26′25″E
- Country: Czech Republic
- Region: Prague

Government
  - Mayor: Ondřej Kubín

Area
  - Total: 24.19 km^{2} (9.34 sq mi)

Population (2021)
  - Total: 130,957
  - Density: 5,414/km^{2} (14,020/sq mi)
- Time zone: UTC+1 (CET)
  - Summer (DST): UTC+2 (CEST)
- Postal code: 140 00
- Website: https://www.praha4.cz

Prague 4, formally the Prague 4 Municipal District (Městská čast Praha 4), is a second-tier municipality in Prague. The administrative district (správní obvod) of the same name consists of municipal districts Prague 4 and Kunratice.

Prague 4 is located just south of Prague 2 and is the biggest municipality in Prague. Most of this district consists of large estates of paneláks. The district is also well connected to the motorway to Brno.

== Government and infrastructure ==
The Prison Service of the Czech Republic is headquartered in this district, together with the High court in Prague as well as the High Public Prosecutor’s Office.

== Climate ==
Climate data for Prague (Libuš) (1991−2020 normals, extremes 1775–present) (Note: extremes were recorded at Clementinum since 1775, Kbely (Prague 19) and Libuš (Prague 4) since 1991, Ruzyně (Prague 6) since 1961 and at Uhříněves (Prague 22) from 1969 to 2012.)
Month	Jan	Feb	Mar	Apr	May	Jun	Jul	Aug	Sep	Oct	Nov	Dec	Year
Record high °C (°F)	17.4 (63.3)	19.5 (67.1)	24.1 (75.4)	30.7 (87.3)	33.0 (91.4)	38.5 (101.3)	40.2 (104.4)	39.6 (103.3)	33.7 (92.7)	27.8 (82.0)	19.5 (67.1)	17.8 (64.0)	40.2 (104.4)
Mean daily maximum °C (°F)	2.7 (36.9)	4.7 (40.5)	9.3 (48.7)	15.4 (59.7)	20.1 (68.2)	23.5 (74.3)	25.7 (78.3)	25.7 (78.3)	20.1 (68.2)	13.9 (57.0)	7.4 (45.3)	3.5 (38.3)	14.3 (57.7)
Daily mean °C (°F)	0.2 (32.4)	1.3 (34.3)	4.9 (40.8)	10.1 (50.2)	14.7 (58.5)	18.2 (64.8)	20.1 (68.2)	19.6 (67.3)	14.7 (58.5)	9.5 (49.1)	4.6 (40.3)	1.2 (34.2)	9.9 (49.8)
Mean daily minimum °C (°F)	−2.4 (27.7)	−1.9 (28.6)	0.9 (33.6)	4.6 (40.3)	8.9 (48.0)	12.5 (54.5)	14.2 (57.6)	13.8 (56.8)	9.9 (49.8)	5.8 (42.4)	2.0 (35.6)	−1.2 (29.8)	5.6 (42.1)
Record low °C (°F)	−27.5 (−17.5)	−27.1 (−16.8)	−27.6 (−17.7)	−8.0 (17.6)	−2.4 (27.7)	−0.6 (30.9)	5.0 (41.0)	3.4 (38.1)	−0.5 (31.1)	−8.2 (17.2)	−16.9 (1.6)	−24.8 (−12.6)	−27.6 (−17.7)
Average precipitation mm (inches)	25.4 (1.00)	21.5 (0.85)	31.0 (1.22)	26.8 (1.06)	67.0 (2.64)	77.7 (3.06)	74.9 (2.95)	76.2 (3.00)	41.8 (1.65)	36.0 (1.42)	30.2 (1.19)	28.1 (1.11)	536.6 (21.15)
Average snowfall cm (inches)	13.3 (5.2)	10.7 (4.2)	4.5 (1.8)	0.4 (0.2)	0.0 (0.0)	0.0 (0.0)	0.0 (0.0)	0.0 (0.0)	0.0 (0.0)	0.2 (0.1)	2.2 (0.9)	7.3 (2.9)	38.6 (15.3)
Average precipitation days (≥ 1.0 mm)	7.6	6.0	7.2	6.4	9.4	10	9.5	8.9	7.6	7.0	7.1	7.0	93.7
Average relative humidity (%)	82.3	77.2	72.0	64.4	65.4	66.0	65.1	66.5	73.7	80.2	85.0	83.9	73.5
Mean monthly sunshine hours	51.4	82.5	126.9	190.8	221.5	229.9	240.9	230.4	164.6	108.0	51.9	43.8	1,742.6
Source 1: NOAA
Source 2: Czech Hydrometeorological Institute

== Demographics ==
Historical population
Year	Pop.	±%
1869	9,112	—
1880	13,847	+52.0%
1890	23,367	+68.8%
1900	36,056	+54.3%
1910	51,024	+41.5%
1921	56,824	+11.4%
1930	95,093	+67.3%
1950	117,960	+24.0%
1961	134,176	+13.7%
1970	168,565	+25.6%
1980	164,737	−2.3%
1991	143,708	−12.8%
2001	131,597	−8.4%
2011	131,793	+0.1%
2021	130,957	−0.6%
Source: Censuses

== Education ==
Two campuses of the Prague British International School are in Prague 4: Kamýk and Libuš. Kamýk belonged to the pre-merger Prague British School, while Libuš belonged to the pre-merger English International School Prague and opened in 2007.

== See also ==
- Districts of Prague#Symbols
