= Kunratice (Prague) =

Municipal district of Prague, Czech Republic

- Municipal district of Prague; Cadastral area of Prague
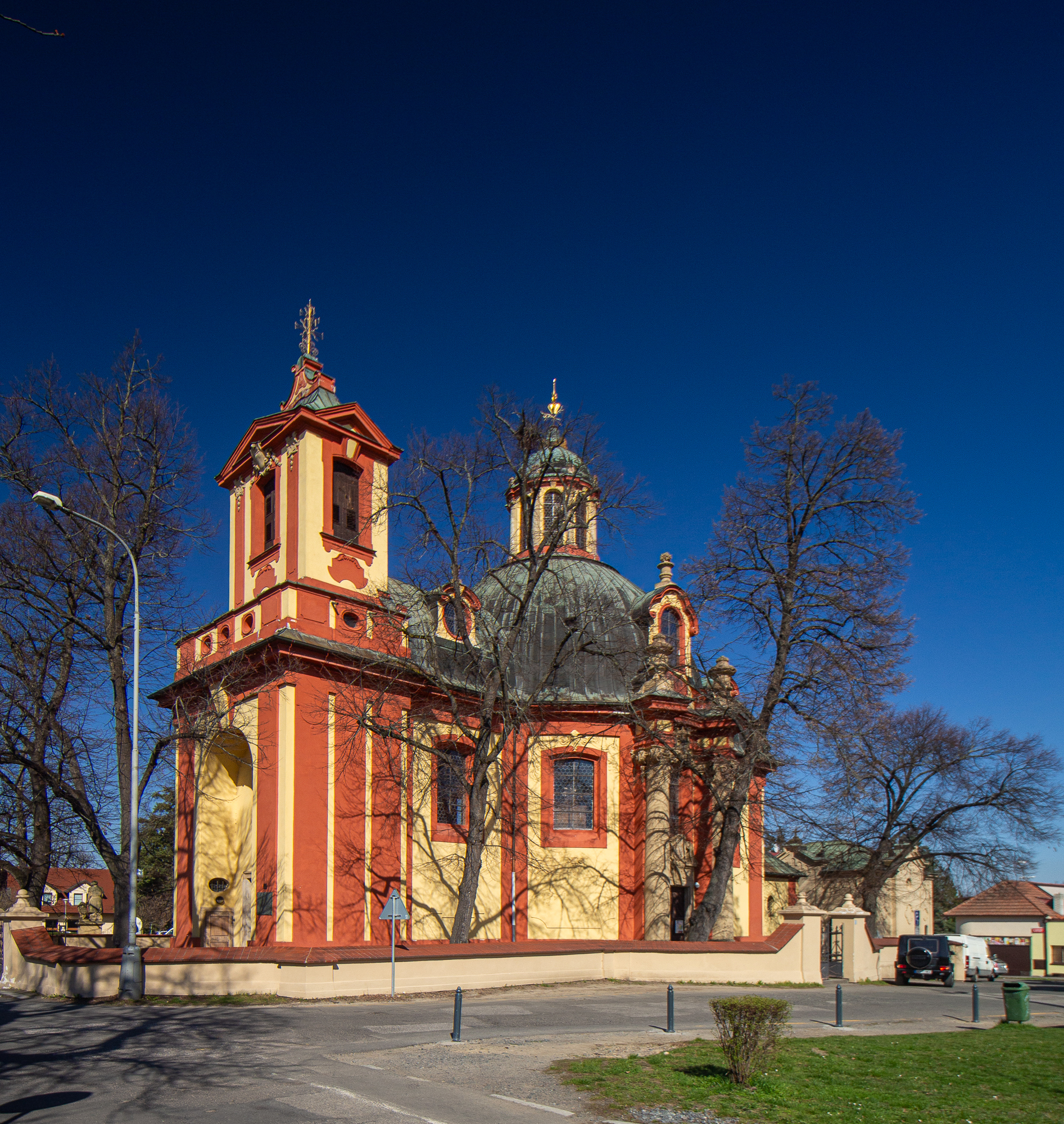
- Church of St. James the Great in Kunratice

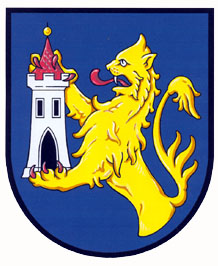
- Flag Coat of arms

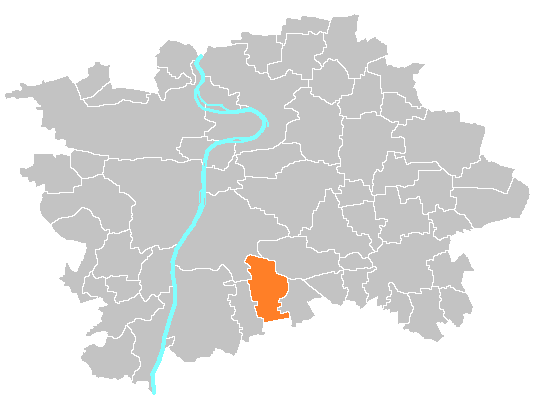
- Location of Kunratice in Prague
- Coordinates: 50°0′48″N 14°29′8″E
- Country: Czech Republic
- Region: Prague
- District: Prague 4

Government
  - Mayor: Ivana Kabelová

Area
  - Total: 8.10 km^{2} (3.13 sq mi)

Population (2021)
  - Total: 10,091
  - Density: 1,250/km^{2} (3,230/sq mi)
- Time zone: UTC+1 (CET)
  - Summer (DST): UTC+2 (CEST)
- Postal code: 148 00
- Website: https://www.praha-kunratice.cz/

Kunratice is a municipal district (městská část) and cadastral area (katastrální území) in Prague. It is located in the southern part of the city. As of 2021, there were 10,091 inhabitants living in Kunratice.

The first written record of Kunratice is from the 13th century. The village became part of Prague in 1968.

In 1990, a bronze bust of T. G. Masaryk, the work of sculptor Vincenzo Makovský from 1935 (twice removed in 1940 and 1950) was restored in the central square of President Masaryk.

== Demographics ==
Historical population
Year	Pop.	±%
1869	798	—
1880	850	+6.5%
1890	1,081	+27.2%
1900	1,104	+2.1%
1910	1,249	+13.1%
1921	1,195	−4.3%
1930	2,259	+89.0%
1950	2,324	+2.9%
1961	2,846	+22.5%
1970	3,259	+14.5%
1980	3,478	+6.7%
1991	3,321	−4.5%
2001	5,470	+64.7%
2011	9,654	+76.5%
2021	10,091	+4.5%
Source: Censuses
