= Panelák =

Colloquial term in Czech and Slovak for a panel building

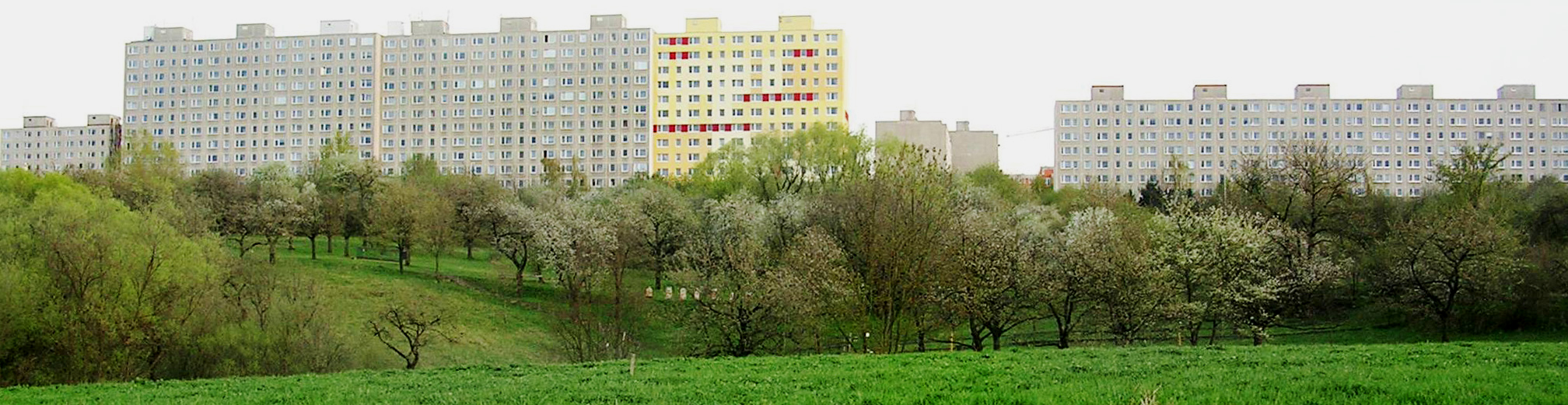
Prague-Hostivař, the Košík housing estate

Panelák (Note: Czech: [ˈpanɛlaːk] Slovak: [ˈpanɛlaːk]) is a colloquial term in Czech and Slovak for a Large-panel-system building constructed from pre-fabricated, pre-stressed concrete, such as those extant in the former Czechoslovakia (now the Czech Republic & Slovakia) and elsewhere in the world. Paneláks are usually grouped together, creating a housing estate (Czech: sídliště, Slovak: sídlisko).

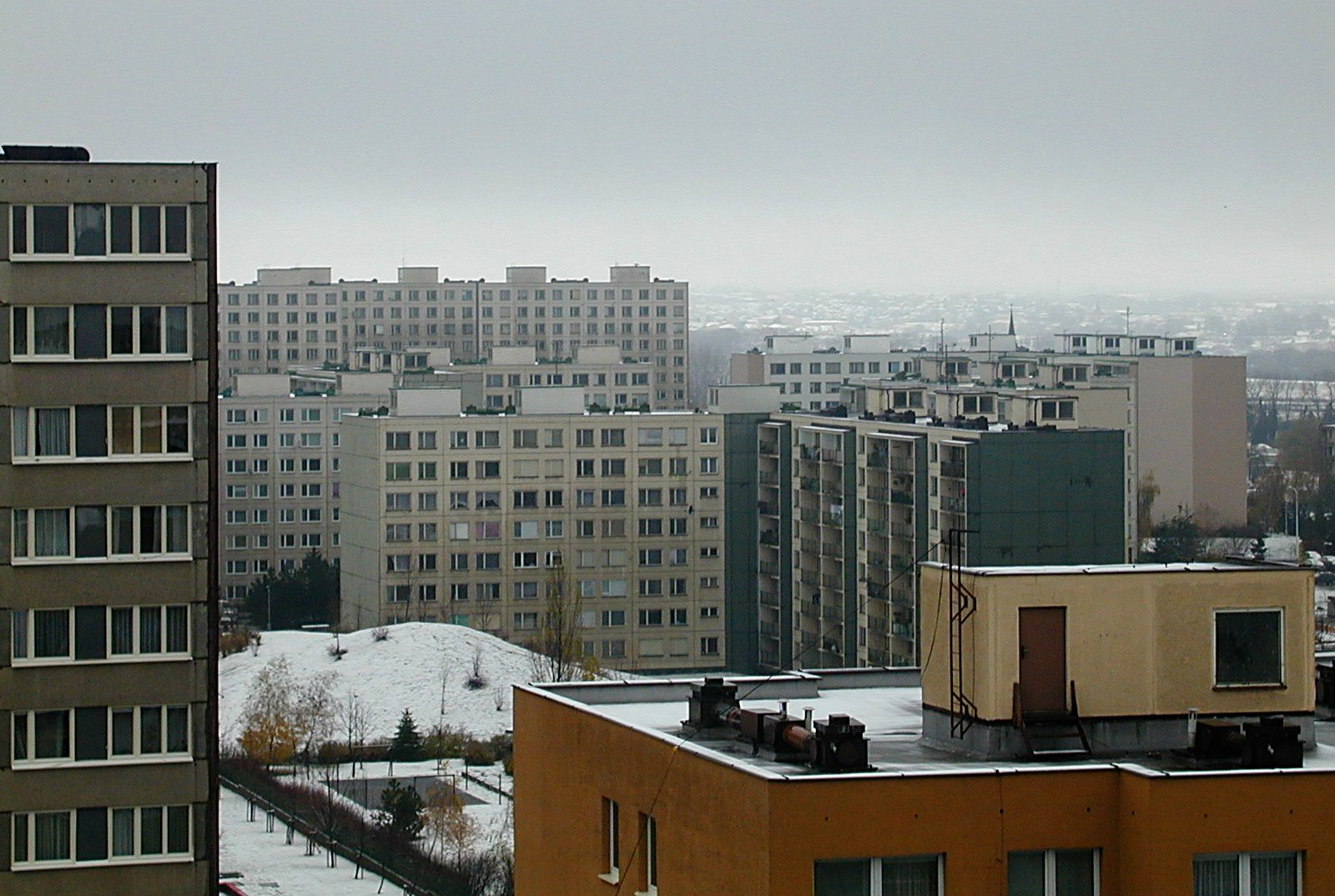
Panel houses in the Prague housing estate Řepy.

Panelák (plural: paneláky) is derived from the standard panelový dům (in Czech) or panelový dom (in Slovak) meaning, literally, "panel house / prefabricated-sections house". The term panelák is used mainly for the elongated blocks with more sections with separate entrances – simple panel tower blocks are called věžový dům (tower house) or colloquially věžák (in Czech). The buildings remain a towering, highly visible reminder of the Communist era. The term panelák refers specifically to buildings in the former Czechoslovakia; however, similar buildings were a common feature of urban planning in communist countries and even in the West.

== History ==
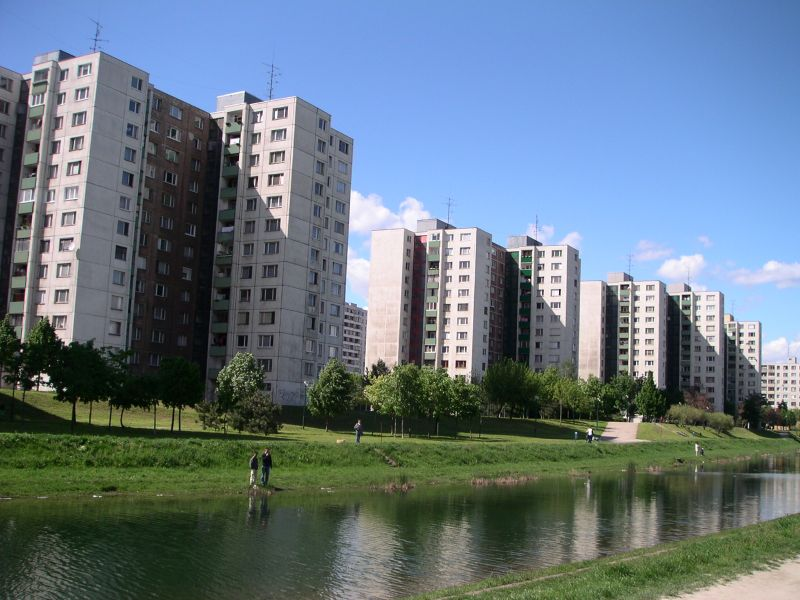
Petržalka in Bratislava, Slovakia

Interwar Czechoslovakia saw many constructivist architects in the country, such as Vladimír Karfík and František Lydie Gahura, many of whom would maintain prominence following the establishment of the Czechoslovak People's Republic in 1948. In the years following 1948, the Czechoslovak architectural scene favored Stalinist architecture over more modern architecture. However, a 1954 speech by Nikita Khrushchev encouraging the construction of panel buildings, coupled with post-war housing shortages faced throughout both Eastern and Western Europe, encouraged the country's architects to construct simple, modernist buildings. Planners from the communist era wanted to provide large quantities of fast and affordable housing, as well as to slash costs by employing uniform designs over the whole country. They also sought to foster a "collectivistic nature" in the people. In case of war, these houses would not be as susceptible to firebombing as traditional, densely packed buildings. Throughout the mid 1950s, the country's designers applied a modernist aesthetic known as the Brussels Style, named after the international attention it attracted during the 1958 World's Fair held in Brussels. By the late 1960s, the country's paneláks often reached up to 16 stories in height.

Between 1959 and 1995, paneláks containing 1.17 million flats were built in what is now the Czech Republic. As of 2005, they housed about 3.5 million people, or about one-third of the country's population.

In Prague and other large cities, most paneláks were built in a type of housing estate known as a sídliště (in Czech) or sídlisko (in Slovak). Such housing developments now dominate large parts of Prague, Bratislava, and other cities and towns. The first such housing development built in Prague was Petřiny in the 1950s; the largest in Prague is Jižní Město (about 100,000 inhabitants), with 200 buildings and 30,000 flats built since the 1970s. The Slovak Petržalka however, is the largest such housing development in Central Europe, with its population exceeding 110,000.

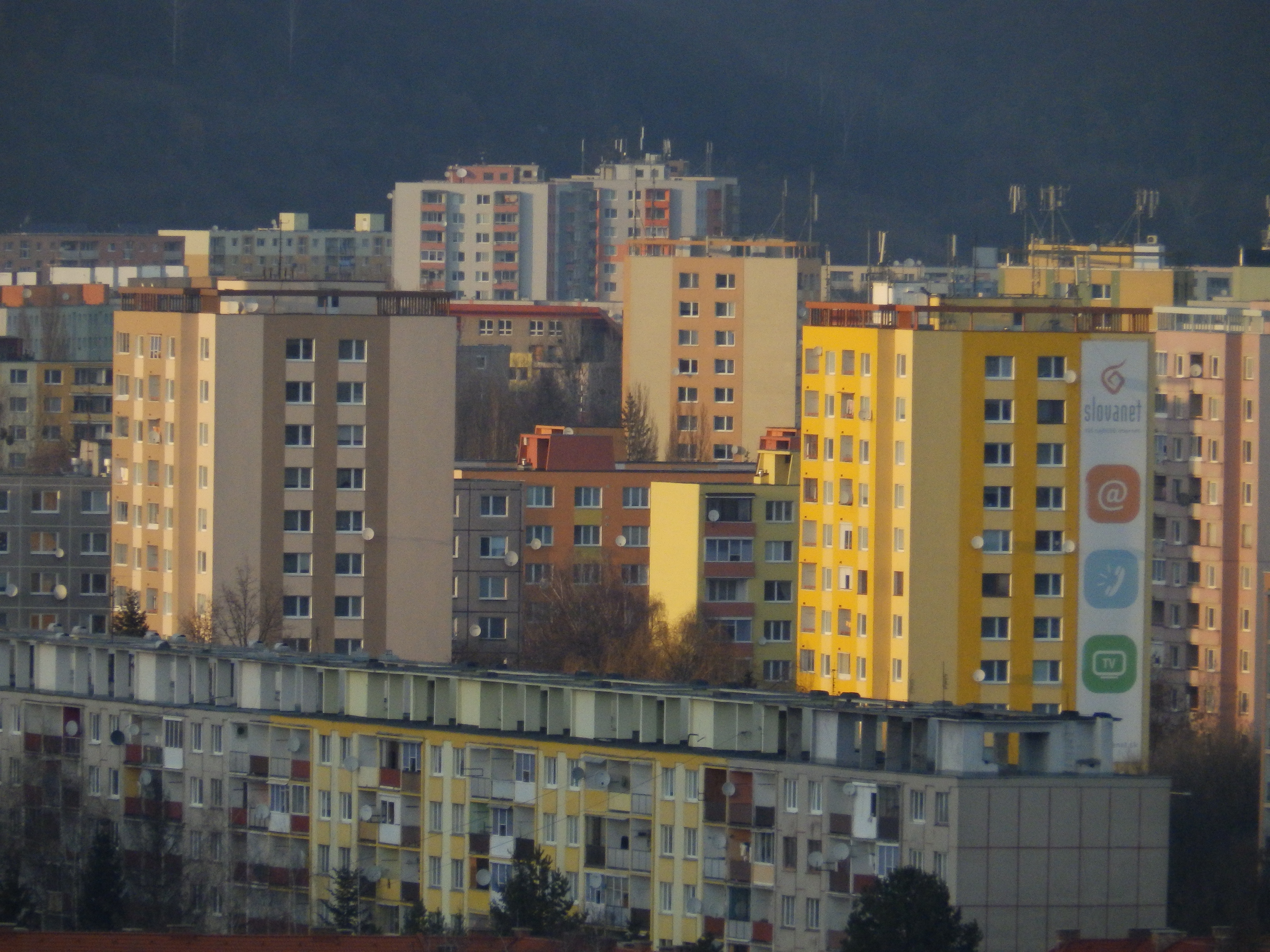
Sídlisko II & III in Prešov, Slovakia.

Following the Velvet Revolution in 1989, there was widespread speculation that the country's paneláks would fall out of favor, due to their simplicity and small size. The Czech and Slovak government sold individual panelák apartments to their tenants for cheap prices, furthering speculation that the apartments would be undesirable. However, these fears have not materialized.

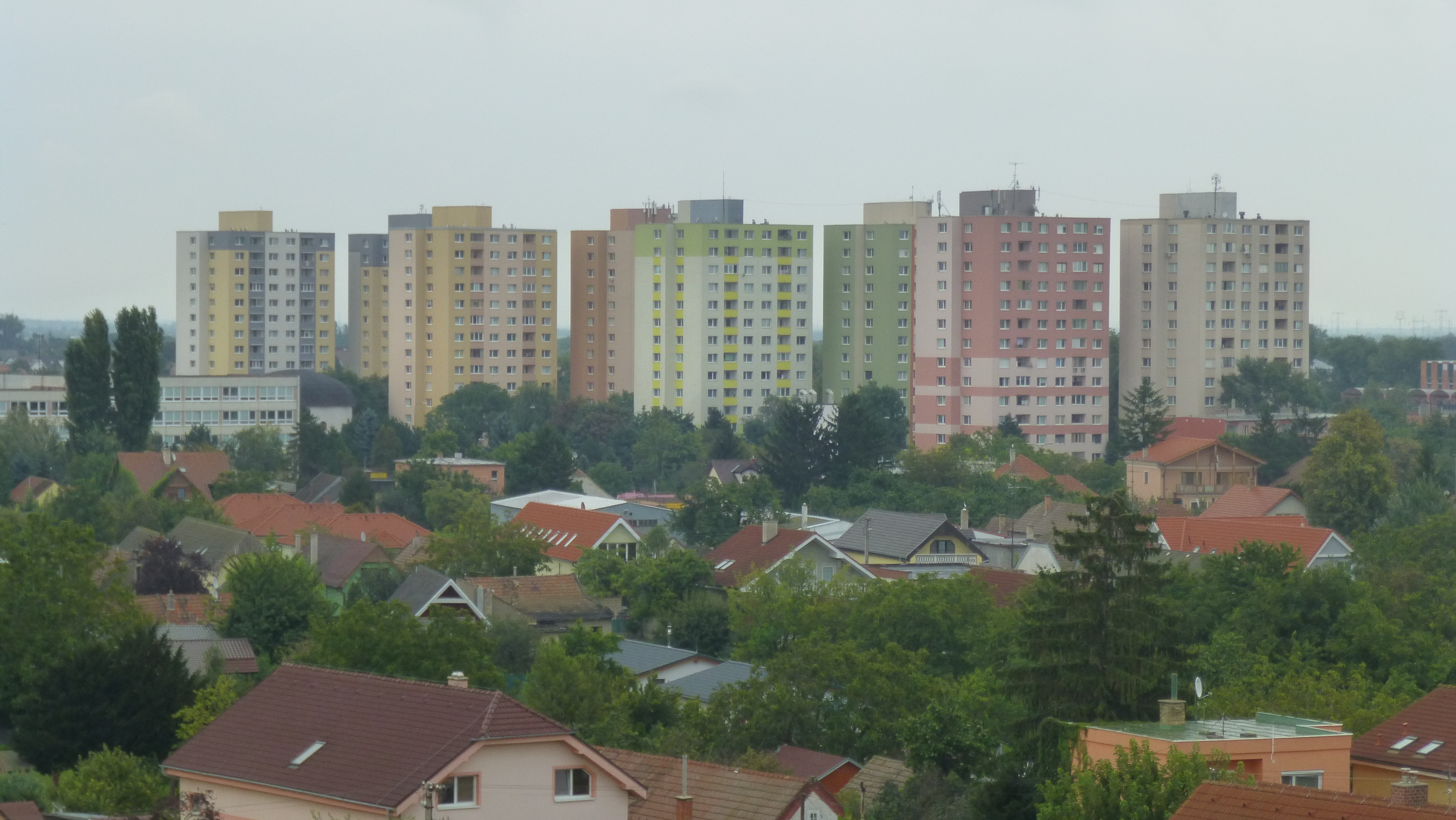
Podunajské Biskupice in Bratislava, Slovakia

=== Records ===
The tallest prefabricated house in the Czech Republic was built in 1980 in Jižní Město in Prague, currently called the Kupa hostel. The 81 m (266 ft) high building with 23 floors is a unique bridge connection on the top floors. One of the longest prefabricated houses is located in Bohnice, Prague, on Zelenohorská Street. The twelve-story building from 1973–1974 with 612 apartments and about 1,500 residents is 340 m (1,120 ft) long and has 18 entrances. It has the longest corridor, water distribution, and heating of a prefabricated house in the country. An even longer prefabricated house is located in Ruprechtice, Liberecké. It is a curved prefabricated house nicknamed Hokejka (Hockey Stick) because of its shape. It has 24 entrances, 11 floors, and 693 apartments.

However, the longest panel house (continuous panel house complex) in the Czech Republic is located in Ostrava on Horní Street (it also extends into Cholevova and Mitušova Streets), it has a total of 28 entrances (of which 26 are in one line), 6–13 floors, 841 apartments and a total length of 540 m (1,770 ft) (of which 500 m (1,600 ft) are in one line).

== Characteristics ==
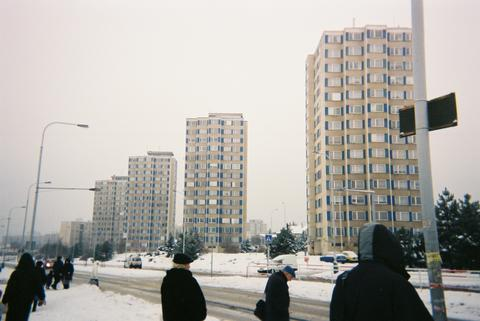
Towering paneláks in the Kamýk area of Prague.

A typical panelák apartment has a foyer, bathroom, kitchen, a living room (also used for dining), and a bedroom. All paneláks in the Czech Republic were constructed to follow one of sixteen design patterns.

Paneláks have been criticized for their simplistic design, poor-quality building materials, and overcrowding. In 1990, Václav Havel, who was then the president of Czechoslovakia, called paneláks "undignified rabbit pens, slated for liquidation". Panelák housing estates as a whole are said by some to be mere bedroom communities with few conveniences and even less character.

However, paneláks have also been praised by many. Upon their introduction, paneláks offered more reliable heating, hot water, and plumbing than existing buildings, especially those in rural locations. The buildings typically offered large amounts of natural light, compared to their older counterparts.

== Today ==
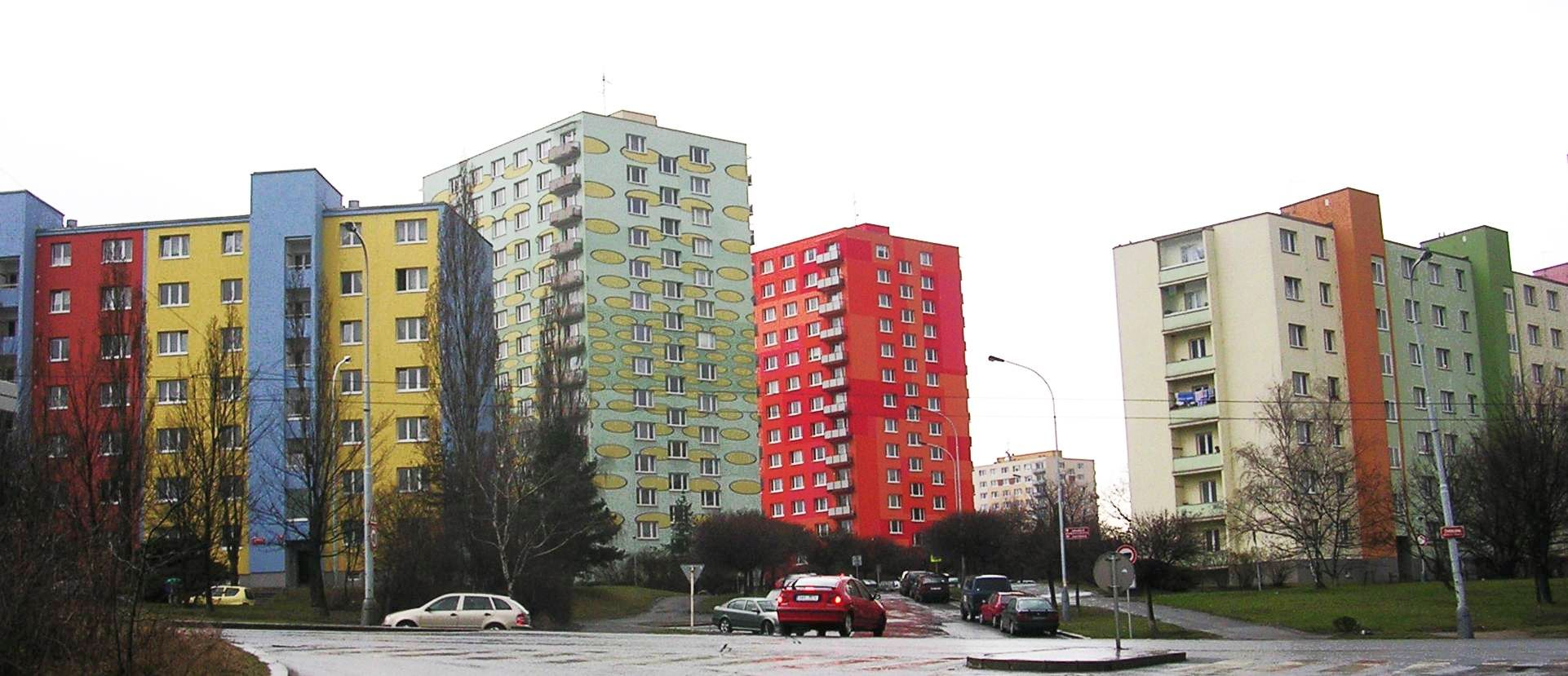
Prague-Záběhlice, the housing estate Zahradní Město-východ.

Paneláks remain commonplace today, and have attracted a wide diversity of social classes. Fears that paneláks would become undesirable and be subject to middle class flight, commonplace following the Velvet Revolution, have not materialized. Panelák apartments have risen in value more than brick apartments, have been praised for housing people from a wide variety of incomes, and have been subject to several positive cultural depictions, including magazines and TV shows.

Areas with high shares of its population living in paneláks include the city of Karviná (where approximately 97% of people live in them), Petržalka, and the city of Most (approx. 80%). Most's historical city was largely torn down due to the spread of coal mining and the majority of its population was moved into paneláks.

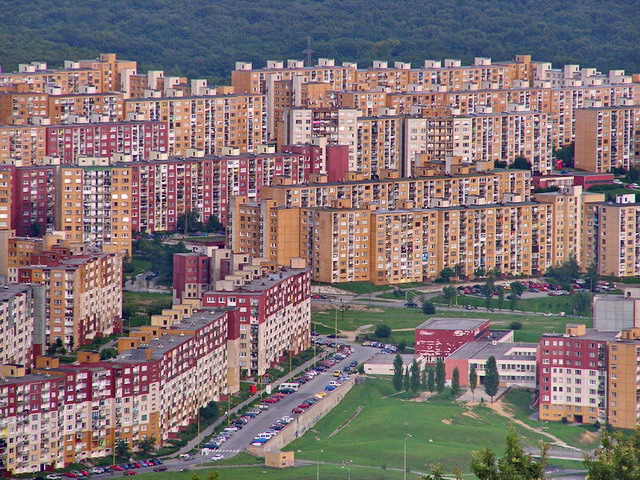
Sídlisko Ťahanovce in Košice, Slovakia.

=== Renovations ===
In March 2005, the director of the Czech Ministry of Regional Development expressed concerns that the country's paneláks were near the end of their lifespan, citing an increasing number of structural incidents. He estimated that his agency would need 400 billion Czech koruna to modernize paneláks in the Czech Republic, and 1.5 trillion to tear them down entirely.

In recent years, many paneláks have been repainted, renovated, and repaired if needed, with funding mainly from the government, partially thanks to funds from the European Union (EU). A sizable renovation market has formed in recent years, and even a home magazine, Panel Plus, exists to give renovators ideas.

=== Ownership ===
Following the Velvet Revolution, most panelák apartments were sold to their tenants at low costs.

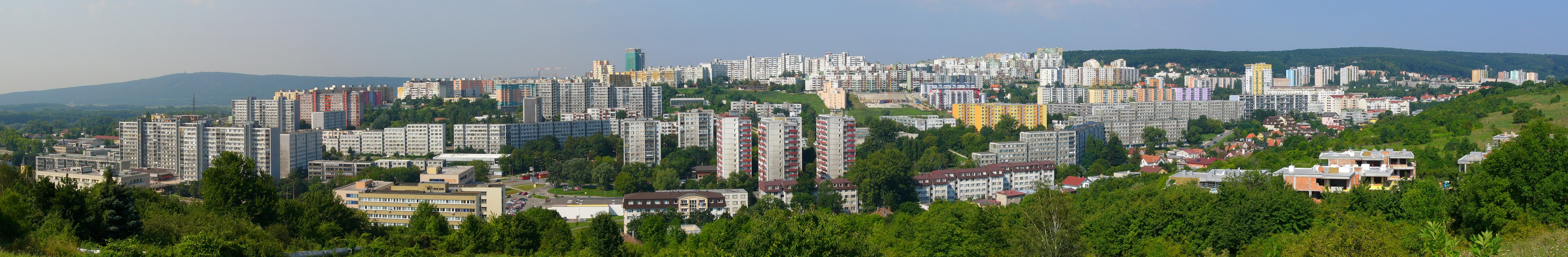
Panorama of Karlova Ves (Dlhé diely) in Bratislava, Slovakia (2008).

== Other countries ==
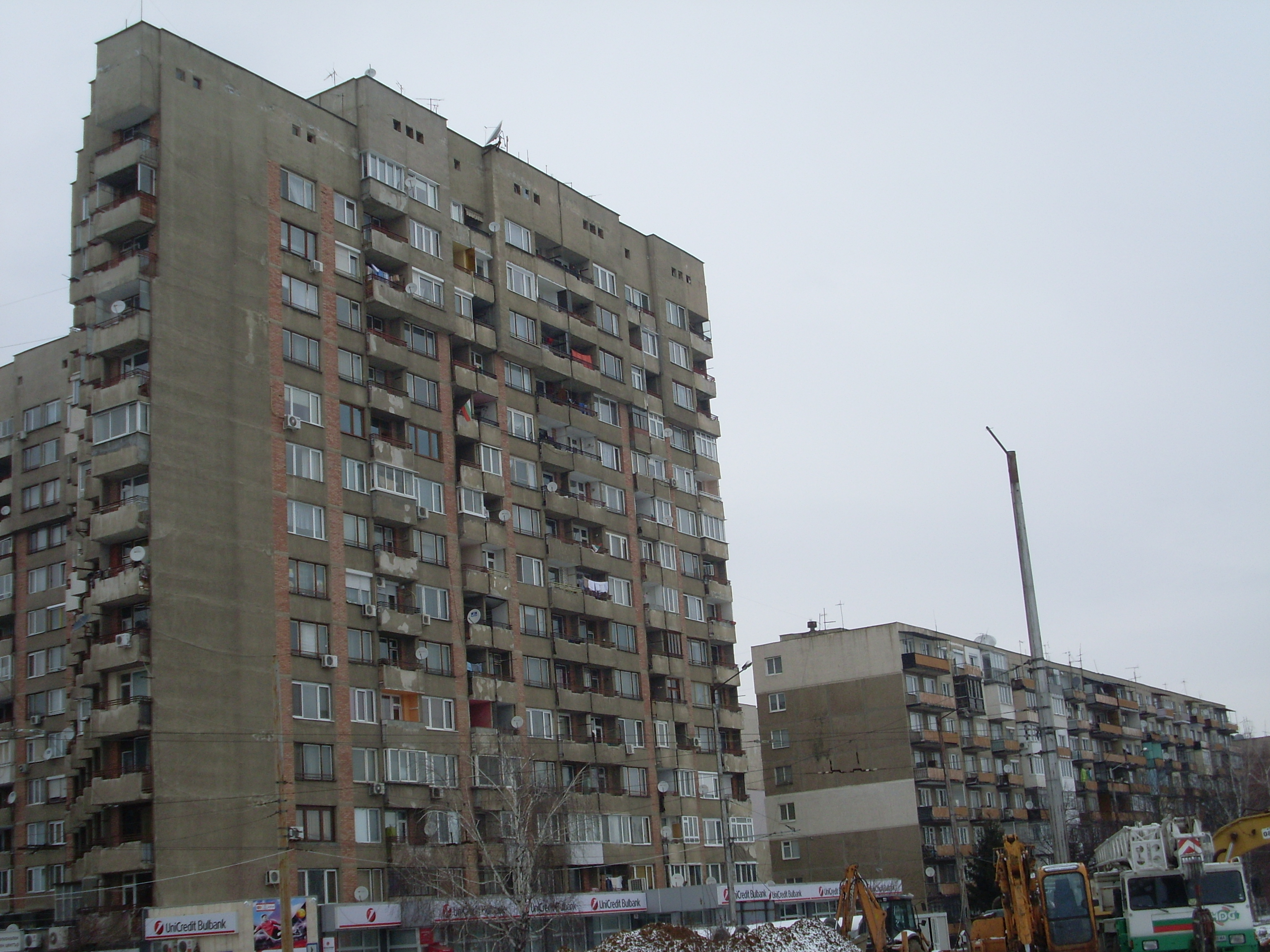
Communist-era apartment buildings in Sofia, Bulgaria.

Buildings similar to paneláks were also built in other communist countries, and they are a common feature of cityscapes across Central and Eastern Europe, and to some degree Northern Europe.

In Bulgaria, buildings similar to paneláks are colloquially known as panelki, and are the predominant type of en masse housing throughout the country. In Hungary, similar buildings are called panelház. In Poland, they are called bloki (blocks), or wielka płyta (the great panel). In Germany, they are known as Plattenbau.

== Popular culture ==
- The movie Panelstory from Věra Chytilová shows the life of several inhabitants in a real, unfinished, communist-bloc apartment. Awarded a Great Prize in San Remo in 1980.
- Béla Tarr's film Panelkapcsolat tells a doomed love story set in a similar housing estate in Hungary. Special Mention at the 1982 Locarno Film Festival.
- Polish director Krzysztof Kieślowski's celebrated Dekalog series is set in a wielka płyta housing estate in Warsaw, Poland.
- The long-running Slovak soap opera Panelák focused on the residents of a single block in Bratislava.
- Other popular TV series set largely within the confines of a panelák include the long-running sitcom Susedia (Neighbours), focusing on the relationships between the ethnically Slovak and Slovak-Hungarian families living within the building, as well as some episodes of the stop-motion animation series Pat & Mat.
- The Czech horror game Panelak released in 2024 is set in an old socialist-era building where strange things happen.

== See also ==
- Sídlisko
- Khrushchevka & Brezhnevka (former Soviet Union)
- Panelház (Hungary)
- Bloc (Romania)
- LPS (Germany)
- HLM (France)
- Million Programme (Sweden)
- Ugsarmal bair (Mongolia)
- Brutalist architecture
- Housing estate
- Affordable housing
- Subsidized housing
- Public housing
