= Hostivař =

- Cadastral district of Prague
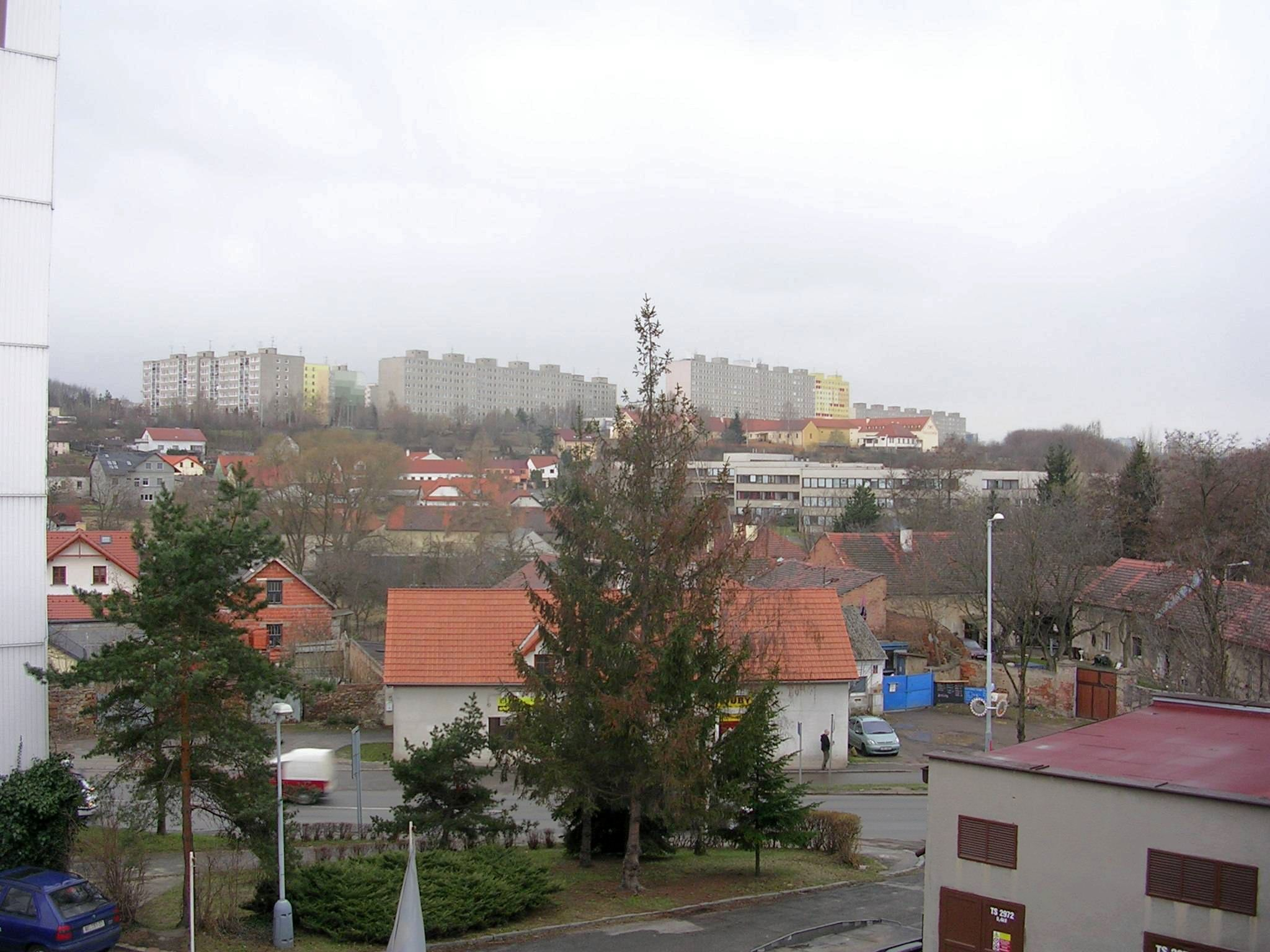

- Location within Czech Republic
- Coordinates: 50°03′10″N 14°31′50″E
- Country: Czech Republic
- Administrative district: Prague 10
- Municipal part: Prague 15

Area
  - Total: 8.00 km^{2} (3.09 sq mi)

Population (2021)
  - Total: 19,161
  - Density: 2,400/km^{2} (6,200/sq mi)

Hostivař (German: Hostiwar) is a cadastral area in southern Prague.

== Demographics ==
Historical population

Year	Pop.	±%
1869	957	—
1880	1,065	+11.3%
1890	1,328	+24.7%
1900	1,596	+20.2%
1910	2,276	+42.6%

Year	Pop.	±%
1921	3,138	+37.9%
1930	5,087	+62.1%
1950	6,010	+18.1%
1961	5,998	−0.2%
1970	5,935	−1.1%

Year	Pop.	±%
1980	11,752	+98.0%
1991	17,359	+47.7%
2001	15,398	−11.3%
2011	18,303	+18.9%
2021	19,161	+4.7%

Source: Censuses
