= List of companies of the Czech Republic =

Location of the Czech Republic

The Czech Republic is a country in Central Europe and a member of the European Union. It has an advanced, high-income economy, as classified by the International Monetary Fund and the World Bank, respectively.

This list includes notable companies with primary headquarters located in the Czech Republic. For information on forms of business organization and their abbreviations, see business entities in the Czech Republic.

== Largest by revenue ==
This is a list of companies based in the Czech Republic by revenue. The list is limited to companies with annual revenues exceeding 100 billion CZK. Revenue, assets and net income are shown in CZK billions.

| Ranking | Name | Industry | Revenue (2024) | Assets | Net income | Employees | Majority owner |
|---|---|---|---|---|---|---|---|
| 1. | Energetický a průmyslový holding, a.s. | Conglomerate | 692.0 | 1,020.1 | 28.8 | 17,680 | EP Group (53%) |
| 2. | ŠKODA AUTO a.s. | Automobiles | 639.8 | 902.0 | 41.6 | 34,215 | Volkswagen AG (via Volkswagen Finance Luxemburg) |
| 3. | ČEZ, a. s. | Electricity | 344.7 | 707.4 | 30.5 | 31,521 | Ministry of Finance (70%) |
| 4. | AGROFERT, a.s. | Conglomerate | 211.7 | 203.6 | 7.1 | 28,969 | AB private trust I (89.97%) |
| 5. | Hyundai Motor Manufacturing Czech s.r.o. | Automobiles | 187.8 | 73.9 | 10.7 | 3,051 | Hyundai Motor Company (100%) |
| 6. | ORLEN Unipetrol a.s. | Chemicals | 163.1 | 121.8 | −16.3 | 5,693 | POLSKI KONCERN NAFTOWY ORLEN S.A. (100%) |
| 7. | FOXCONN CZ s.r.o. | Electronics | 119.1 | 54.4 | 2.1 | | Foxconn (100%) |
| 8. | CZECHOSLOVAK GROUP a.s. | Defense | 100.7 | 202.2 | 15.9 | 10,137 | Michal Strnad (84.8%) |

== Notable firms ==
This list includes notable companies with primary headquarters located in the country. The industry and sector follow the Industry Classification Benchmark taxonomy. Organizations which have ceased operations are included and noted as defunct.

Notable companies Status: P=Private, S=State; A=Active, D=Defunct
| Name | Industry | Sector | Headquarters | Founded | Notes | Status | |
|---|---|---|---|---|---|---|---|
| Aero Vodochody | Industrials | Aerospace | Odolena Voda | 1919 | Military aircraft manufacturer | P | A |
| Aircraft Industries | Industrials | Aerospace & defense | Kunovice | 1936 | Aircraft manufacturer, producer of the L 410; subsidiary of Omnipol | P | A |
| Albert Czech Republic | Consumer services | Food retailers & wholesalers | Prague | 1991 | Supermarkets, owned by Ahold Delhaize | P | A |
| Alpine Pro | Consumer goods | Clothing & accessories | Prague | 1994 | Sportswear and outdoor clothing | P | A |
| Alza.cz | Consumer services | Broadline retailers | Prague | 1994 | Online retailer | P | A |
| Avast | Technology | Software | Prague | 1988 | Security software | P | A |
| Barrandov Studios | Consumer services | Broadcasting & entertainment | Prague | 1921 | Film studios | P | A |
| Bochemie | Basic materials | Specialty chemicals | Bohumín | 1904 | Specialty chemicals and metallized textiles | P | A |
| Bohemia Interactive | Technology | Software | Prague | 1999 | Video game developer and publisher | P | A |
| Budweiser Budvar Brewery | Consumer goods | Brewers | České Budějovice | 1785 | Brewery | S | A |
| Colt CZ Group | Industrials | Defense | Prague | 2013 | Firearms and ammunition | P | A |
| Continental Barum | Consumer goods | Automobiles & parts | Otrokovice | 1993 | Tyre manufacturer, part of Continental AG (Germany) | P | A |
| Česká pošta | Industrials | Delivery services | Prague | 1918 | Postal services | S | A |
| Česká spořitelna | Financials | Banks | Prague | 1825 | Bank, part of Erste Group (Austria) | P | A |
| Česká zbrojovka firearms | Industrials | Defense | Uherský Brod | 1936 | Weapons | P | A |
| České dráhy | Industrials | Railroads | Prague | 2003 | Railways | S | A |
| České Radiokomunikace | Telecommunications | Fixed line telecommunications | Prague | 1963 | Telecom | P | A |
| Československá obchodní banka | Financials | Banks | Prague | 1964 | Bank | P | A |
| CETIN | Telecommunications | Fixed line telecommunications | Prague | 2015 | Telecommunication infrastructure | P | A |
| Cinema City Czech Republic | Consumer services | Recreational services | Prague | 1999 | Theatres | P | A |
| Czech National Bank | Financials | Banks | Prague | 1919 | Central bank | S | A |
| Doosan Škoda Power | Industrials | Industrial machinery | Plzeň | 1859 | Steam turbines and power-generation equipment | P | A |
| Dr. Max Group | Consumer services | Drug retailers | Prague | 2004 | Pharmacy chain owned by Penta Investments | P | A |
| Eurowag | Financials | Specialty finance | Prague | 1995 | Road transport payments and mobility services | P | A |
| Explosia | Industrials | Defense | Pardubice | 1998 | Explosives and propellants, including Semtex | S | A |
| Fio banka | Financials | Banks | Prague | 1994 | Retail and investment banking | P | A |
| GZ Media | Industrials | General industrials | Loděnice | 1951 | Vinyl records, printing and packaging | P | A |
| Indies Records | Consumer services | Broadcasting & entertainment | Brno | 1990 | Record label | P | A |
| Jablotron | Consumer goods | Consumer electronics | Jablonec nad Nisou | 1990 | Phones and security devices | P | A |
| Jan Becher | Consumer goods | Distillers & vintners | Karlovy Vary | 1807 | Liqueur | P | A |
| Jihostroj | Industrials | Aerospace | Velešín | 1919 | Aircraft components | P | A |
| Kiwi.com | Consumer services | Travel & tourism | Brno | 2012 | Online travel agency | P | A |
| Kofola | Consumer goods | Soft drinks | Ostrava | 1960 | Beverages | P | A |
| Koh-i-Noor Hardtmuth | Consumer goods | Nondurable household products | České Budějovice | 1790 | Writing instruments | P | A |
| Komerční banka | Financials | Banks | Prague | 1990 | Bank | P | A |
| Kubíček Factory | Industrials | Aerospace | Brno | 1991 | Hot-air balloons, inflatables and technical textiles | P | A |
| LEO Express | Industrials | Railroads | Prague | 2010 | Rail | P | A |
| Livesport | Technology | Internet | Prague | 2006 | Sports data and media | P | A |
| Mafra | Consumer services | Publishing | Prague | 1992 | Print media | P | A |
| Meopta | Industrials | Electronic equipment | Přerov | 1933 | Optics | P | A |
| Metrostav | Industrials | Heavy construction | Prague | 1971 | Heavy construction | P | A |
| MONETA Money Bank | Financials | Banks | Prague | 1998 | Bank | P | A |
| Moser | Consumer goods | Furnishings | Karlovy Vary | 1857 | Glass | P | A |
| Mouka Tišnov | Consumer goods | Clothing & accessories | Tišnov | 1842 | Textile webbings and trimmings | P | A |
| O2 Czech Republic | Telecommunications | Telecommunications | Prague | 2006 | Fixed and mobile operator | P | A |
| OKD | Basic materials | Coal | Ostrava | 1952 | Coal mining | S | A |
| Omnipol | Industrials | Defense | Prague | 1934 | Aerospace and defence group | P | A |
| PBS Velká Bíteš | Industrials | Aerospace | Velká Bíteš | 1950 | Aircraft engines and aerospace systems | P | A |
| Pilsner Urquell Brewery | Consumer goods | Brewers | Plzeň | 1842 | Brewery | P | A |
| Preciosa | Consumer goods | Furnishings | Jablonec nad Nisou | 1948 | Glasswares | P | A |
| Prusa Research | Industrials | Industrial machinery | Prague | 2012 | 3D printers | P | A |
| Racom | Consumer goods | Consumer electronics | Nové Město na Moravě | 1989 | Electronics | P | A |
| Red Hat Czech | Technology | Software | Brno | 2006 | Open-source software development, subsidiary of Red Hat (US) | P | A |
| RegioJet | Consumer services | Travel & tourism | Brno | 1996 | Travel agency | P | A |
| Royal Brewery of Krušovice | Consumer goods | Brewers | Krušovice | 1581 | Brewery, now part of Heineken (Netherlands) | P | A |
| Rudolf Kämpf | Consumer goods | Furnishings | Nové Sedlo | 1907 | Porcelain | P | A |
| Seznam.cz | Technology | Internet | Prague | 1996 | Internet services and media | P | A |
| Škoda Auto | Consumer goods | Automobiles | Mladá Boleslav | 1896 | Automotive | P | A |
| Škoda Transportation | Industrials | Commercial vehicles & trucks | Plzeň | 1995 | Mass transport vehicles | P | A |
| Sky Paragliders | Industrials | Aerospace | Frýdlant nad Ostravicí | 1998 | Paragliders, harnesses and reserve parachutes | P | A |
| Smartwings | Consumer services | Airlines | Prague | 1998 | Airline | P | A |
| Pivovary Staropramen | Consumer goods | Brewers | Prague | 1869 | Brewery, part of Molson Coors | P | A |
| Supraphon | Consumer services | Broadcasting & entertainment | Prague | 1932 | Record label | P | A |
| STV Group | Industrials | Defense | Prague | 2000 | Ammunition and military equipment | P | A |
| T-Mobile Czech Republic | Telecommunications | Mobile telecommunications | Prague | 1996 | Mobile and fixed-line operator, part of Deutsche Telekom (Germany) | P | A |
| Tatra | Industrials | Commercial vehicles & trucks | Kopřivnice | 1850 | Trucks | P | A |
| Tescan | Industrials | Electronic equipment | Brno | 1991 | Electron microscopes and analytical instruments | P | A |
| Tescoma | Consumer goods | Durable household products | Zlín | 1992 | Kitchen utensils and tools | P | A |
| Třinec Iron and Steel Works | Basic materials | Iron & steel | Třinec | 1836 | Iron & steel | P | A |
| UniCredit Bank Czech Republic and Slovakia | Financials | Banks | Prague | 2006 | Bank | P | A |
| Vodafone Czech Republic | Telecommunications | Mobile telecommunications | Prague | 1982 | Mobile operator, part of Vodafone (UK) | P | A |
| Warhorse Studios | Technology | Software | Prague | 2011 | Video game developer | P | A |
| WGCZ Holding | Consumer services | Broadcasting & entertainment | Prague | 2012 | Online adult industry | P | A |
| Wikov Group | Industrials | Industrial machinery | Prague | 2004 | Industrial gearboxes and hydropower equipment | P | A |
| Zentiva | Health care | Pharmaceuticals | Prague | 1993 | Generic and over-the-counter pharmaceuticals | P | A |
| Zetor | Industrials | Commercial vehicles & trucks | Brno | 1946 | Tractors | P | A |

=== Defunct companies ===
This section lists of notable companies formerly headquartered in what is now the Czech Republic that have ceased operating:

| Name | Industry | Headquarters | Founded | Notes |
|---|---|---|---|---|
| Czech Connect Airlines | Air transport | Ostrava | | Filed for bankruptcy in January 2012 |
| ČKD | Conglomerate | Prague | 1927 | Defunct 2000 |
| Kenvelo | Apparel retailer | Jablonec nad Nisou | 1991 | Defunct 2016 |
| LIAZ | Automotive | Jablonec nad Nisou | 1951 | Truck manufacturer, defunct 2002 |
| Poldi | Steel | Kladno | | Steelworks; production had stopped when the company was declared bankrupt in December 2017. |
| Škoda Works | Engineering | Plzeň | 1859 | Historical engineering conglomerate; successor businesses continued separately. |
| Walter Aircraft Engines | Aerospace | Prague | 1911 | Aircraft engine manufacturer, defunct 2008 |
| Živnostenská banka | Banking | Prague | 1868 | Historical commercial bank, defunct 2006 |

== See also ==
- Economy of the Czech Republic
- List of banks in the Czech Republic
- List of supermarket chains in the Czech Republic
