= Brezany =

Brezany, Brežany and Břežany may refer to places:

== Czech Republic ==
- Břežany (Klatovy District), a municipality and village in the Plzeň Region
- Břežany (Rakovník District), a municipality and village in the Central Bohemian Region
- Břežany (Znojmo District), a municipality and village in the South Moravian Region
- Břežany, a village and part of Lešany (Benešov District) in the Central Bohemian Region
- Břežany, a village and part of Nové Sedlo (Louny District) in the Ústí nad Labem Region
- Břežany I, a municipality and village in the Central Bohemian Region
- Břežany II, a municipality and village in the Central Bohemian Region
- Břežany nad Ohří, a village and part of Budyně nad Ohří in the Ústí nad Labem Region
- Dolní Břežany, a municipality and village in the Central Bohemian Region
- Panenské Břežany, a municipality and village in the Central Bohemian Region

== Slovakia ==
- Brežany, Prešov District, a municipality and village in the Prešov Region
- Brežany, Žilina District, a municipality and village in the Žilina Region
- Nedožery-Brezany, a municipality in the Trenčín Region
