= Nové Sedlo =

Nové Sedlo may refer to places in the Czech Republic:

- Nové Sedlo (Louny District), a municipality and village in the Ústí nad Labem Region
- Nové Sedlo (Sokolov District), a town in the Karlovy Vary Region
