= Poldi =

Poldi or Poldy may refer to:

== People ==
=== Nickname ===
- Prince Leopold of Bavaria (born 1943), Bavarian prince and former race car driver
- Leopold Bentley, born Leopold Bloch-Bauer, a co-founder of what became Canfor, a Canadian integrated forest products company
- Leopoldine Maria Josefa Kalmus, mother of philosopher Ludwig Wittgenstein
- Leopold Kielholz (1911–1980), Swiss footballer
- Leopoldine Kovarik (1919–1943), German anti-Nazi activist
- Lukas Podolski (born 1985), Polish-German footballer
- Leopold Schädler (1926–1992), Liechtenstein alpine skier

=== Other ===
- Poldy Bird (1941–2018), Argentinian writer and poet
- Poldi Hirsch (1926–1987), German-born American architect
- Poldi Dur, Austrian dancer and stage actress born Elisabeth Handl (1917–1996)

== Other uses ==
- Poldy, nickname of Leopold Bloom, protagonist of James Joyce's 1922 novel Ulysses
- Poldi Kladno, previous name of SK Kladno, a football club from Kladno, Czech Republic

== See also ==
- Poldek
