= Hirsch Residence =

Historic house in Maryland, US

- U.S. National Register of Historic Places
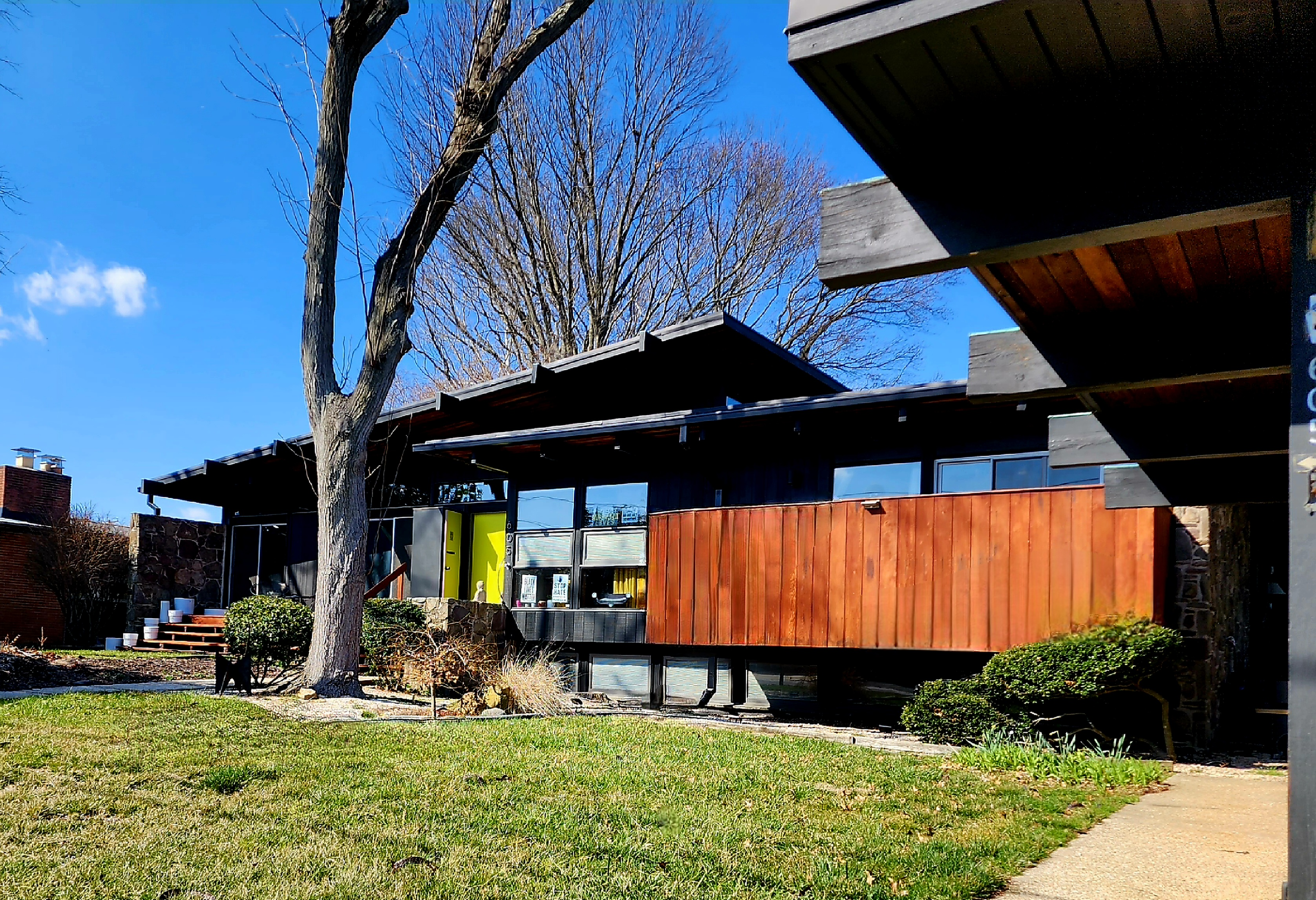
- Hirsch Residence, March 2023

- Location within Maryland Location within the United States
- Location: 605 Giles St., Havre de Grace, Maryland
- Coordinates: 39°32′23″N 76°05′39″W
- Built: 1969-1970
- Built by: Carl Thomas
- Architect: Poldi Hirsch
- Architectural style: Mid-century Modern
- MPS: Women in Maryland Architecture, 1920-1970
- NRHP reference No.: 100008592
- Added to NRHP: February 2, 2023

Hirsch Residence is a historic home located at Havre de Grace, Harford County, Maryland. The house was built between 1969 and 1970, and is a one-story, mid-century modern, single-family dwelling. It features low, horizontal, modernist massing in an L-shaped plan. It was designed by noted female architect Poldi Hirsch.

It was listed on the National Register of Historic Places in 2023.
