= Felix Imre =

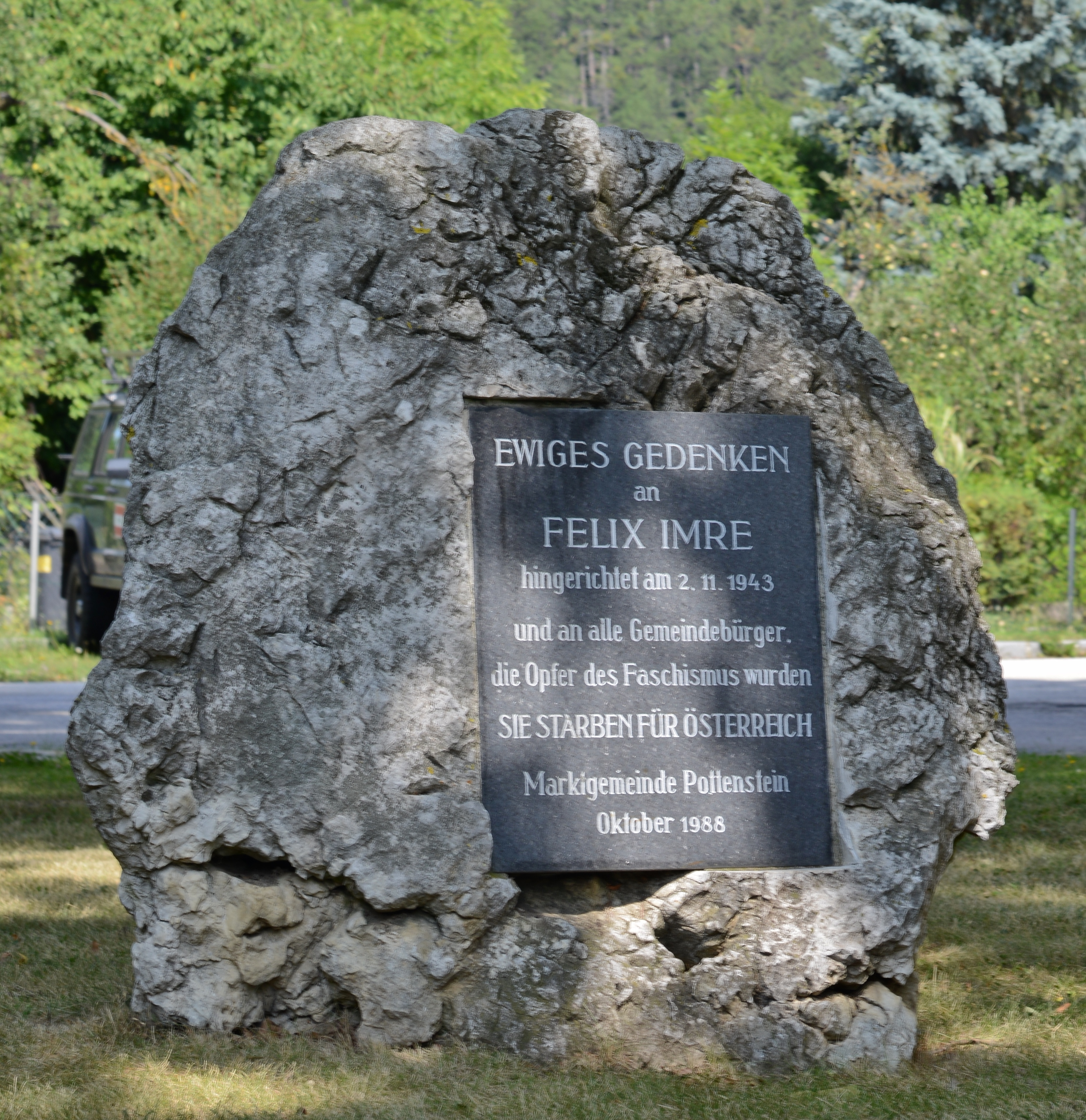
A memorial stone in Pottenstein commemorating Imre’s death.

Felix Imre (19 November 1917 – 2 November 1943) was an Austrian soldier of the German Wehrmacht and later a Resistance fighter. He was sentenced to death by Volksgerichtshof and decapitated.

== Life and work ==
Imre was born in the village of Pottenstein close to Vienna. As a young man he joined the Nazi Party and SA when both organizations were still illegal in Austria. He fought in World War II and was awarded an Iron Cross (second class) for his merits in the battle of France. Due to his war experiences, he repositioned himself politically and, in 1941, joined an Austrian resistance group Soldatenrat. This group was part of the Communist Youth of Austria. Together with Elfriede Hartmann, Friedrich Mastny, Franz Reingruber, and others, he produced flyers and letters to soldiers calling for resistance against the Nazi regime and an end of the cruel war. On 13 April 1942 Imre was arrested and thereafter heavily tortured by the Gestapo. On 24 September 1943 he was put on trial before the Volksgerichtshof for preparation of high treason and Feindbegünstigung (giving aid and comfort to the enemy) and sentenced to capital punishment.

In all, 13 members of the resistance group Soldatenrat were sentenced to death and decapitated at the Regional Court of Vienna. The six women and seven men were in the age range of 18 to 25 when they were condemned to death. Five weeks after his trial, Imre was guillotined.

== Commemoration ==
Imre's name is listed on the Memorial Plaque for 536 persons executed by the Nazi jurisdiction for political reasons in Vienna between 1942 and 1945. The plaque is located in the former execution hall of Vienna's regional court. The corpse of Imre was buried in a shaft grave complex at the Zentralfriedhof of Vienna, where most of the beheaded men and women were interred. The grave can be found in Section 40 (Row 26, Grave 190).

In October 1988 his home village, Pottenstein, dedicated a memorial stone to "Felix Imre and all citizens of the village who became victims of fascism". The memorial stone can be found in the Josef-Stockinger-Park.
