= Mall Varna =

- Location: Varna, Bulgaria
- Coordinates: 43°13′13″N 27°53′23″E
- Opened: June 12, 2008
- Developer: Miller Developments & Chapman Taylor
- Owner: Aspius Immobilien Holding International GmbH
- Num. of stores: 150
- Floor area: 33,000 m^{2} (360,000 sq ft)
- Floors: 5
- Parking: 760 underground on 3 decks & outdoor parking

Varna Mall is a shopping mall in Varna, Bulgaria, which was opened on June 12, 2008. It is located on the intersection of the Boulevards Vladislav Varnenchik & Hristo Smirnenski and it was built at a cost of € 120 million. Mall Varna's construction took two years.

The mall has:

- 70,000 m^{2} (750,000 sq ft) total built-up area
- 33,000 m^{2} (360,000 sq ft) total shopping area
- 2,000 m^{2} (22,000 sq ft) Indoor Market
- 2 floors with fashion shops (including Kenvelo, New Yorker, Nike, Adidas, Puma, Camper, Lee Cooper, Esprit, Le Coq Sportif & more.)
- 8 cinema halls with 1300 seats Cinema Complex Arena
- Restaurants, coffee shops and chains including Kentucky Fried Chicken and Subway.
- 800 m^{2} (8,600 sq ft) Children entertainment center Capella Play
