= Pottenstein, Austria =

Pottenstein
- Municipality
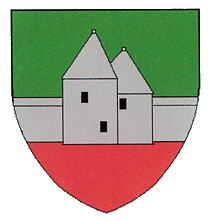
- Coat of arms

- Location within Austria
- Coordinates: 47°57′N 16°5′E
- Country: Austria
- State: Lower Austria
- District: Baden

Government
  - Mayor: Manfred Schweiger

Area
  - Total: 33.37 km^{2} (12.88 sq mi)
- Elevation: 324 m (1,063 ft)

Population (2018-01-01)
  - Total: 2,909
  - Density: 87.17/km^{2} (225.8/sq mi)
- Time zone: UTC+1 (CET)
  - Summer (DST): UTC+2 (CEST)
- Postal code: 2563, 2564
- Area code: 02672
- Website: www.pottenstein.at

Pottenstein (German pronunciation: [ˈpɔtn̩ˌʃtaɪn]) is a town in the district of Baden in Lower Austria in Austria.

== Geography ==
Pottenstein lies in the valley of the Triesting in the Vienna Woods and borders on Berndorf and Weissenbach an der Triesting.

The operatic soprano Daniela Fally was born in Pottenstein.

== Notable people ==
- Felix Imre (1917-1943) - World War II Resistance fighter
