= Chranišov =

- Village
- Location in the Czech Republic
- Coordinates: 50°13′24″N 12°44′40″E
- Country: Czech Republic
- Region: Karlovy Vary
- District: Sokolov
- First mentioned: 1454

Population (2011)
  - Total: 281
- Time zone: UTC+1 (CET)
  - Summer (DST): UTC+2 (CEST)
- Postal code: 357 35

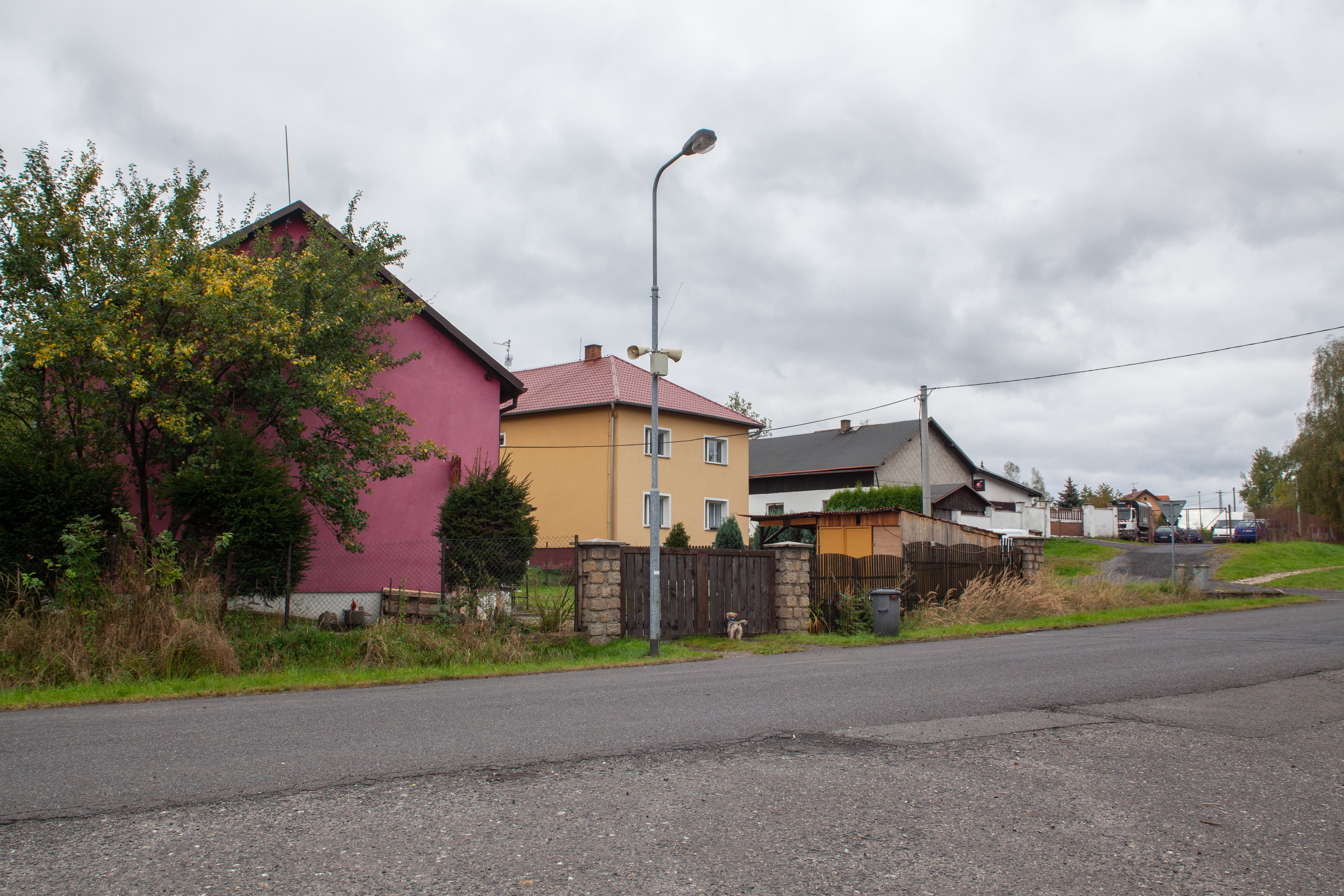
A road in the village

Chranišov (German: Granesau) is a village, part of the municipality of Nové Sedlo, in the Sokolov District of the Karlovy Vary Region of the Czech Republic. It is located to the south of Chodov.
