= Rudolf Kämpf =

Czech porcelain manufacturer

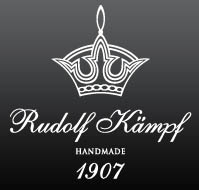
- Type: Manufacture
- Industry: Porcelain production
- Founded: 1907
- Headquarters: Nové Sedlo, Czech Republic
- Key people: Benjamin Franklin Hunt (Founder); Rudolf Kämpf (co-owner)
- Website: www.rudolfkampf.eu

Rudolf Kämpf is a porcelain manufacturer in the Czech Republic.

== History ==
Benjamin Franklin Hunt founded the Egerländer Porzellanfabrik Elbogen, G.m.b.H. on 15 June 1907 in Loučky in Nové Sedlo after receiving written approval for the reconstruction of a porcelain factory at the site of the previous brick plant. Production of porcelain is traditional in this area because there are abundant resources of kaolin, loam and other raw materials. Hence, some people of great influence were interested in building a porcelain industry in the country which would be competitive with leading European producers.

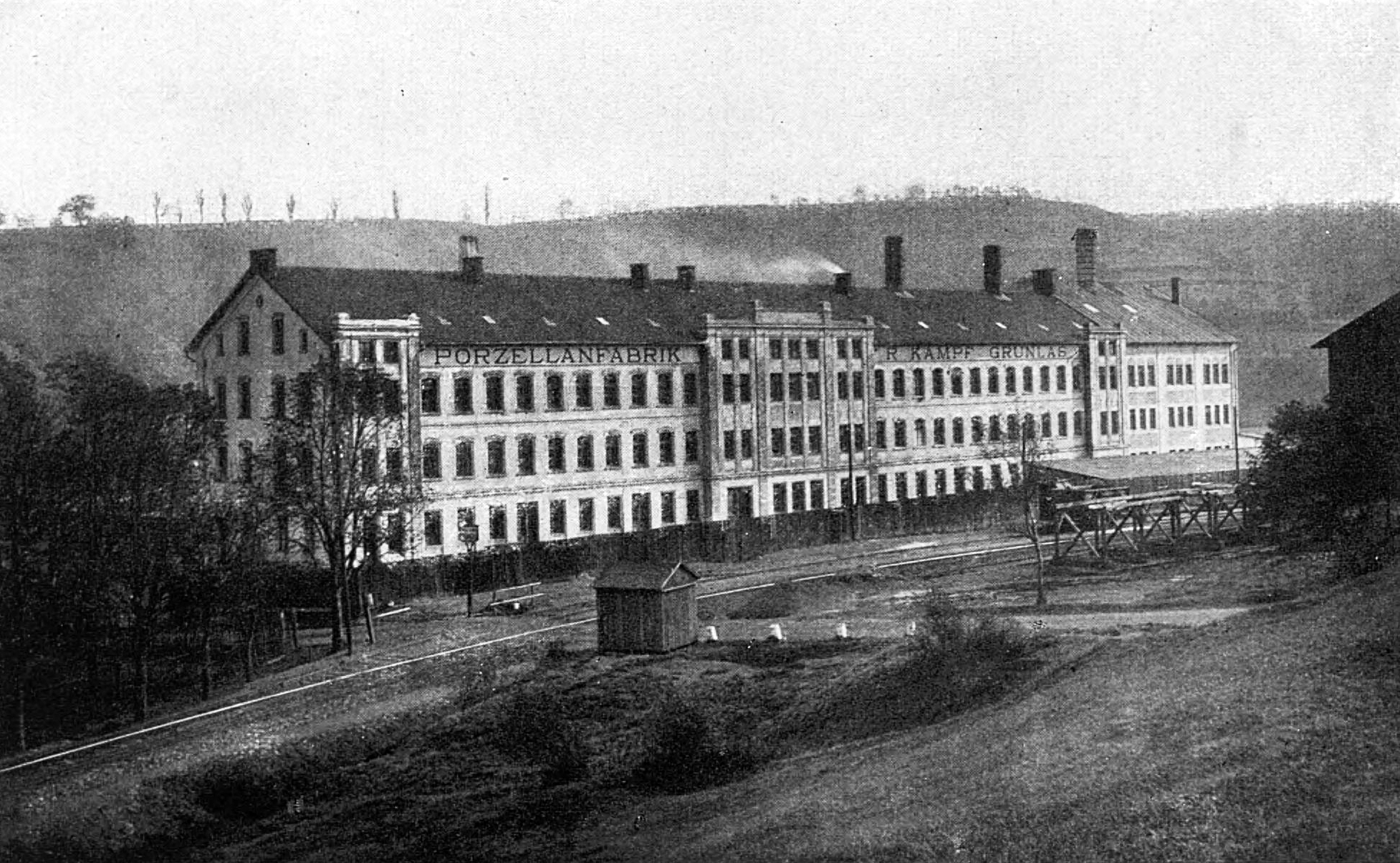
First porcelain factory building

When Benjamin Hunt and Eleanor Hunt became the directors, they had already cooperated with the owner of Loket's company Austria, Karl Shpek. Reconstruction work started in 1904–1905. But very soon the company went bankrupt and the reconstruction was stopped.

On 8 December 1909, doctor Yuliy Geller bought the unfinished building of the porcelain factory. On 21 July 1910, Benjamin Hunt and Karl Shpek got a concession for porcelain production from the beginning of 1912, and on 25 September 1911 the firm was registered under the name of Porzellan fabrik Rudolf Kämpf GmbH, Grünlas.

In December, the plant was registered again under the name of Rudolf Kämpf GmbH, Fabrikation und Vertrieb von Porzellanwaren und der dazu gehörigen Nebenprodukte, in Grünlas. The image of a crown with letters RGK below was chosen as the logotype.

Rudolf Kämpf, a skilled businessman, developed the company successfully. On 19 March 1918 he died, and his son Huns Kampf succeeded him as head of the company.

After World War II, the factory changed greatly. With the coming of the new government, the company was nationalized and became a part of Slavkovsky porcelain group, and in 1958 part of the Karlovarsky porcelain concern, which was ruled by the government.

In November 1992, the factory changed ownership to Leander 1946 s.r.o. company, and from this time it was named Leander. Leander became one of the most important producers of art porcelain in Europe.

== Present ==
In 2006, the Leander company was sold to CS Investment Czech holding. The new owners returned the name of the founder to the factory and today it is called Rudolf Kämpf and produces handmade porcelain under 3 trademarks:

- Rudolf Kämpf: premium-class porcelain
- Leander: mass-market porcelain

Rudolf Kämpf mainly produces porcelain.
