= Břežany (Rakovník District) =

- Municipality
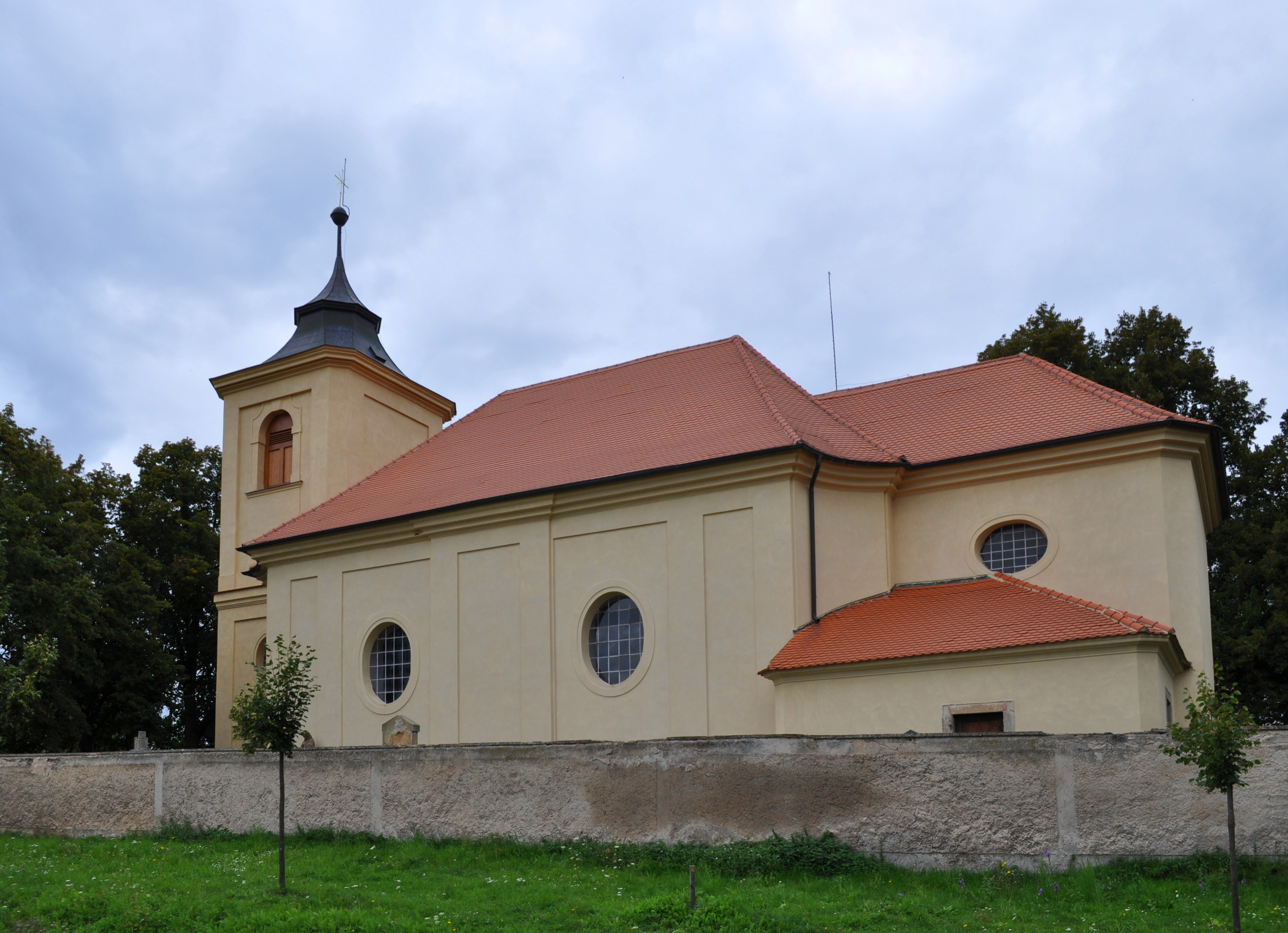
- Church of Saint Margaret

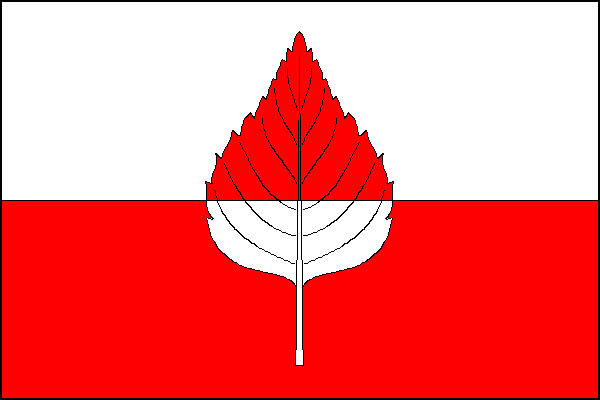
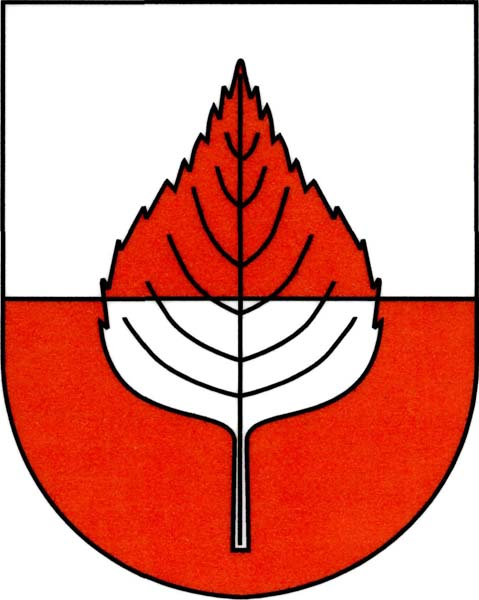
- Flag Coat of arms

- Location in the Czech Republic
- Coordinates: 50°0′25″N 13°34′58″E
- Country: Czech Republic
- Region: Central Bohemian
- District: Rakovník
- First mentioned: 1414

Area
  - Total: 7.88 km^{2} (3.04 sq mi)
- Elevation: 442 m (1,450 ft)

Population (2026-01-01)
  - Total: 122
  - Density: 15.5/km^{2} (40.1/sq mi)
- Time zone: UTC+1 (CET)
  - Summer (DST): UTC+2 (CEST)
- Postal code: 270 34
- Website: www.obecbrezany.cz

Břežany is a municipality and village in Rakovník District in the Central Bohemian Region of the Czech Republic. It has about 100 inhabitants.

== Etymology ==
The name Břežany is derived from the word břeh ('bank' in Czech, but in old Czech also meaning 'hillside') or from the word březí ('birch forest'). The word břežané denoted people who live near a bank, hillside or birch forest, so Břežany was a village of such people.

== Geography ==
Břežany is located about 17 kilometres (11 mi) southwest of Rakovník and 31 km (19 mi) north of Plzeň. It lies in the Plasy Uplands. The highest point is at 471 m (1,545 ft) above sea level.

== History ==
The first written mention of Břežany is from 1414.

== Demographics ==
Historical population

Year	Pop.	±%
1869	336	—
1880	328	−2.4%
1890	330	+0.6%
1900	337	+2.1%
1910	337	+0.0%

Year	Pop.	±%
1921	330	−2.1%
1930	270	−18.2%
1950	190	−29.6%
1961	194	+2.1%
1970	155	−20.1%

Year	Pop.	±%
1980	133	−14.2%
1991	126	−5.3%
2001	113	−10.3%
2011	135	+19.5%
2021	121	−10.4%

Source: Censuses

== Transport ==
There are no railways or major roads passing through the municipality.

== Sights ==
The main landmark of Břežany is the Church of Saint Margaret. The original building was completely destroyed during the Hussite Wars, restored after 1560, and then again destroyed during the Thirty Years' Wars. The current church was built in the Baroque style in 1727.

The second valuable building in Břežany is a Baroque granary. It dates from 1797.
