= Brežany, Prešov District =

Brežany
- Municipality
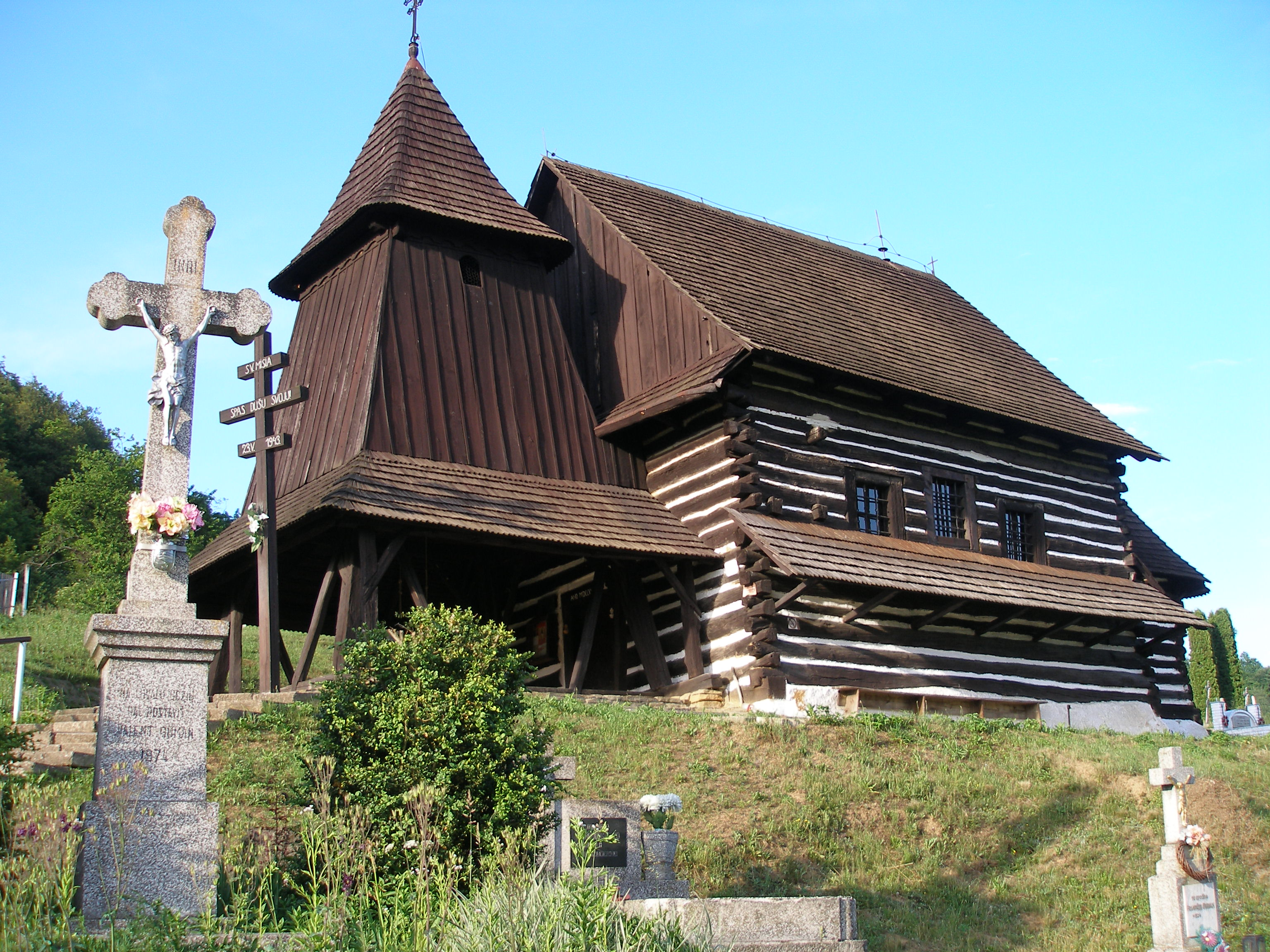

- Flag

- Location of Brežany in the Prešov Region Location of Brežany in Slovakia
- Coordinates: 48.98°N 21.11°E
- Country: Slovakia
- Region: Prešov Region
- District: Prešov District
- First mentioned: 1329

Area
  - Total: 3.30 km^{2} (1.27 sq mi)
- Elevation: 367 m (1,204 ft)

Population (2025)
  - Total: 211
- Time zone: UTC+1 (CET)
  - Summer (DST): UTC+2 (CEST)
- Postal code: 824 1
- Area code: +421 51
- Vehicle registration plate (until 2022): PO
- Website: www.obecbrezany.com

Brežany (Rusyn: Брежаны; Hungarian: Sárosbuják) is a village and municipality in Prešov District in the Prešov Region of eastern Slovakia.

== History ==
In historical records the village was first mentioned in 1329.

== Geography ==
The municipality lies at an altitude of 367 metres (1,204 ft) and covers an area of 3.30 km^{2} (1.27 sq mi) (2025).

== Population ==
Population statistic (10 years)
Year	1995	2005	2015	2025
Count	170	147	165	211
Difference		−13.52%	+12.24%	+27.87%

Population statistic
Year	2024	2025
Count	213	211
Difference		−0.93%

It has a population of 211 people (31 December 2025).

=== Ethnicity ===
Census 2021 (1+ %)
Ethnicity	Number	Fraction
Slovak	196	98.49%
Not found out	3	1.5%
Turkish	2	1%
Russian	2	1%
Total	199	

In year 2021 was 199 people by ethnicity 196 as Slovak, 3 as Not found out, 2 as Turkish, 2 as Russian and 1 as Czech.

Note on population: The difference values of population numbers in the table "Population statistic" and in the sections "Ethnicity" & "Religion" is caused by the use of various statistical methods.

=== Religion ===
Census 2021 (1+ %)
Religion	Number	Fraction
Roman Catholic Church	158	79.4%
None	15	7.54%
Evangelical Church	14	7.04%
Greek Catholic Church	8	4.02%
Not found out	2	1.01%
Islam	2	1.01%
Total	199	

In year 2021 was 199 people by religion 158 from Roman Catholic Church, 15 from None, 14 from Evangelical Church, 8 from Greek Catholic Church, 2 from Not found out and 2 from Islam.

== Genealogical resources ==
The records for genealogical research are available at the state archive "Statny Archiv in Presov, Slovakia"

- Roman Catholic church records (births/marriages/deaths): 1798–1897 (parish B)
- Greek Catholic church records (births/marriages/deaths): 1825–1898 (parish B)
- Lutheran church records (births/marriages/deaths): 1753–1895 (parish B)

== See also ==
- List of municipalities and towns in Slovakia
