= Břežany II =

- Municipality
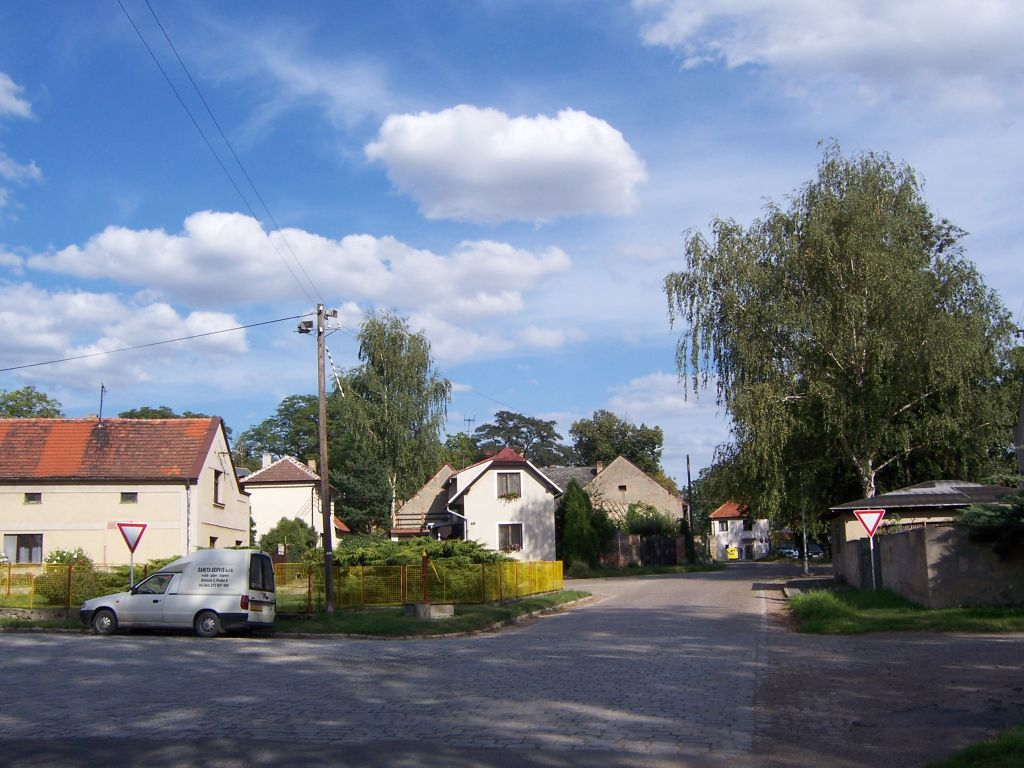
- Centre of Břežany II

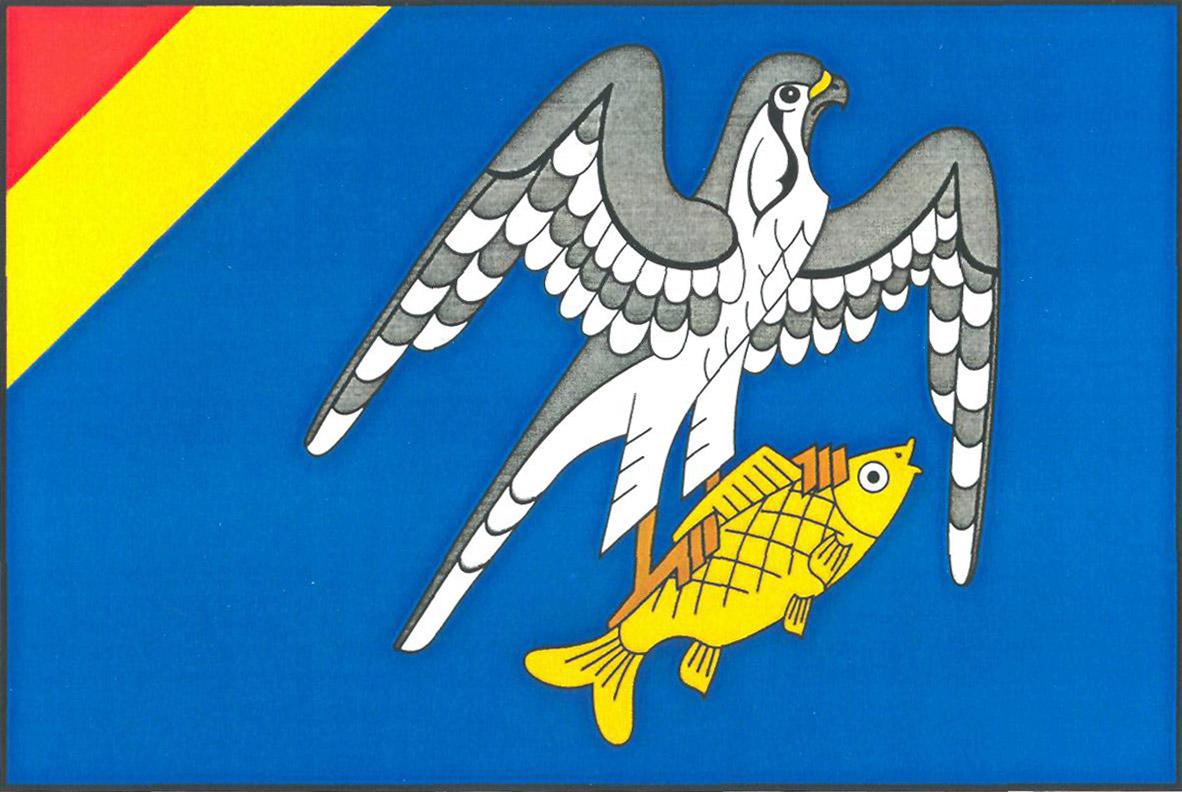
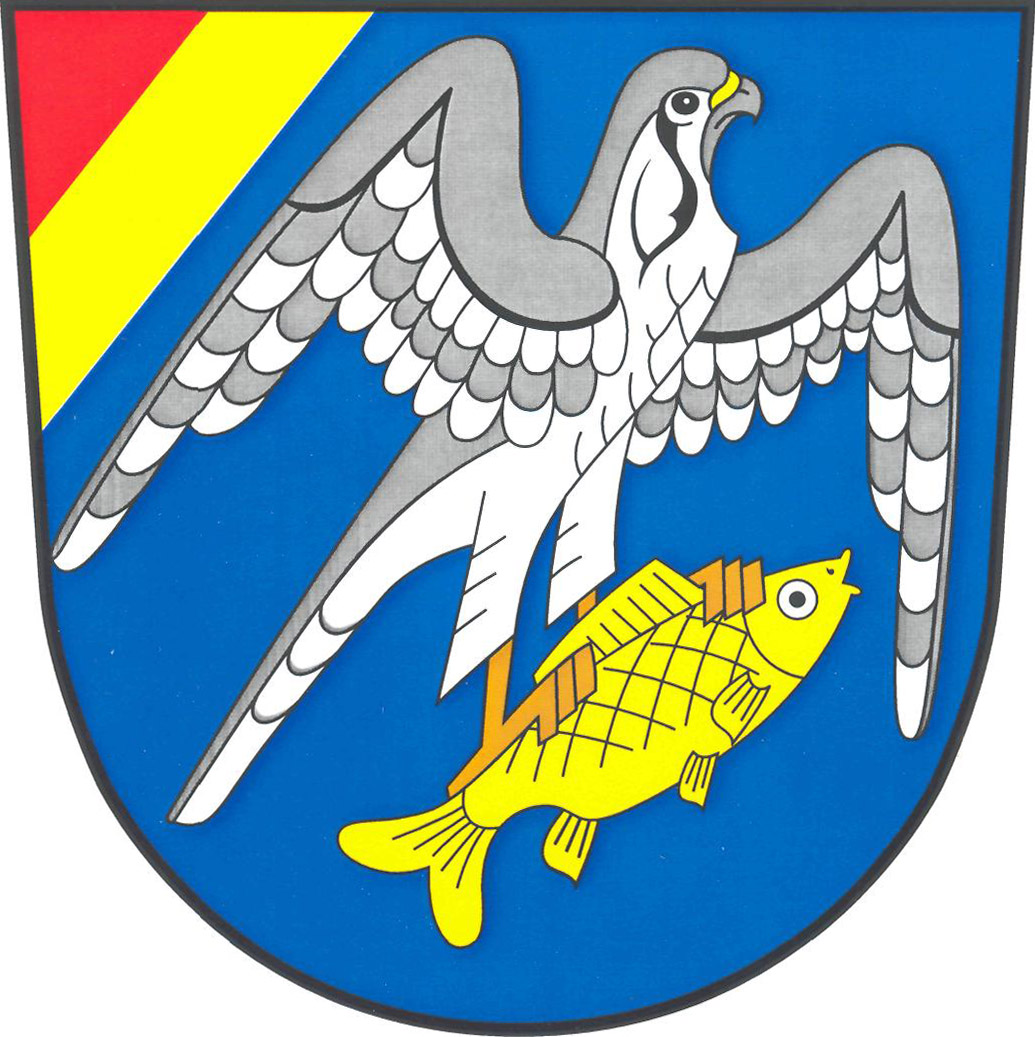
- Flag Coat of arms

- Location in the Czech Republic
- Coordinates: 50°5′38″N 14°48′16″E
- Country: Czech Republic
- Region: Central Bohemian
- District: Kolín
- First mentioned: 1305

Area
  - Total: 9.11 km^{2} (3.52 sq mi)
- Elevation: 258 m (846 ft)

Population (2026-01-01)
  - Total: 922
  - Density: 101/km^{2} (262/sq mi)
- Time zone: UTC+1 (CET)
  - Summer (DST): UTC+2 (CEST)
- Postal code: 282 01
- Website: www.brezanyii.cz

Břežany II is a municipality and village in Kolín District in the Central Bohemian Region of the Czech Republic. It has about 900 inhabitants.

== Etymology ==
The name Břežany is derived from the word břeh ('[river] bank' in Czech, but in old Czech also meaning 'hillside') or from the word březí ('birch forest'). The word břežané denoted people who live near a bank, hillside or birch forest, so Břežany was a village of such people.

The Roman numeral in the name serves to distinguish it from the nearby municipality of the same name, Břežany I. The Roman numeral has been used since 1960.

== Geography ==
Břežany II is located about 28 kilometres (17 mi) west of Kolín and 20 km (12 mi) east of Prague. It lies in a flat agricultural landscape on the border between the Central Elbe Table and Prague Plateau. In the eastern part of the municipal territory is a small flooded quarry.

== History ==
The first written mention of Břežany is from 1305. Until 1588, the village was divided into two parts; one part was owned by the royal chamber and the other was owned by the Prague archbishopric. In 1588, the entire village was acquired by the Smiřický noble family and annexed to the Kostelec estate. In 1622, the estate was bought by the Liechtenstein family. In 1639, during the Thirty Years' War, Břežany was looted by the Swedish army under the leadership of Johan Banér.

== Demographics ==
Historical population

Year	Pop.	±%
1869	571	—
1880	678	+18.7%
1890	701	+3.4%
1900	744	+6.1%
1910	703	−5.5%

Year	Pop.	±%
1921	664	−5.5%
1930	871	+31.2%
1950	695	−20.2%
1961	652	−6.2%
1970	603	−7.5%

Year	Pop.	±%
1980	587	−2.7%
1991	483	−17.7%
2001	502	+3.9%
2011	653	+30.1%
2021	932	+42.7%

Source: Censuses

== Transport ==
There are no railways or major roads passing through the municipality.

== Sights ==
Among the protected cultural monuments in Břežany II are a gate of a homestead, dating from the first half of the 19th century, and a fire mast rotary siren. The siren, located on a 4 m (13 ft) high mast, was constructed in the 1920s and was brought to Břežany II in 1935 at the latest.
