= Elfriede Hartmann =

Viennese chemistry student

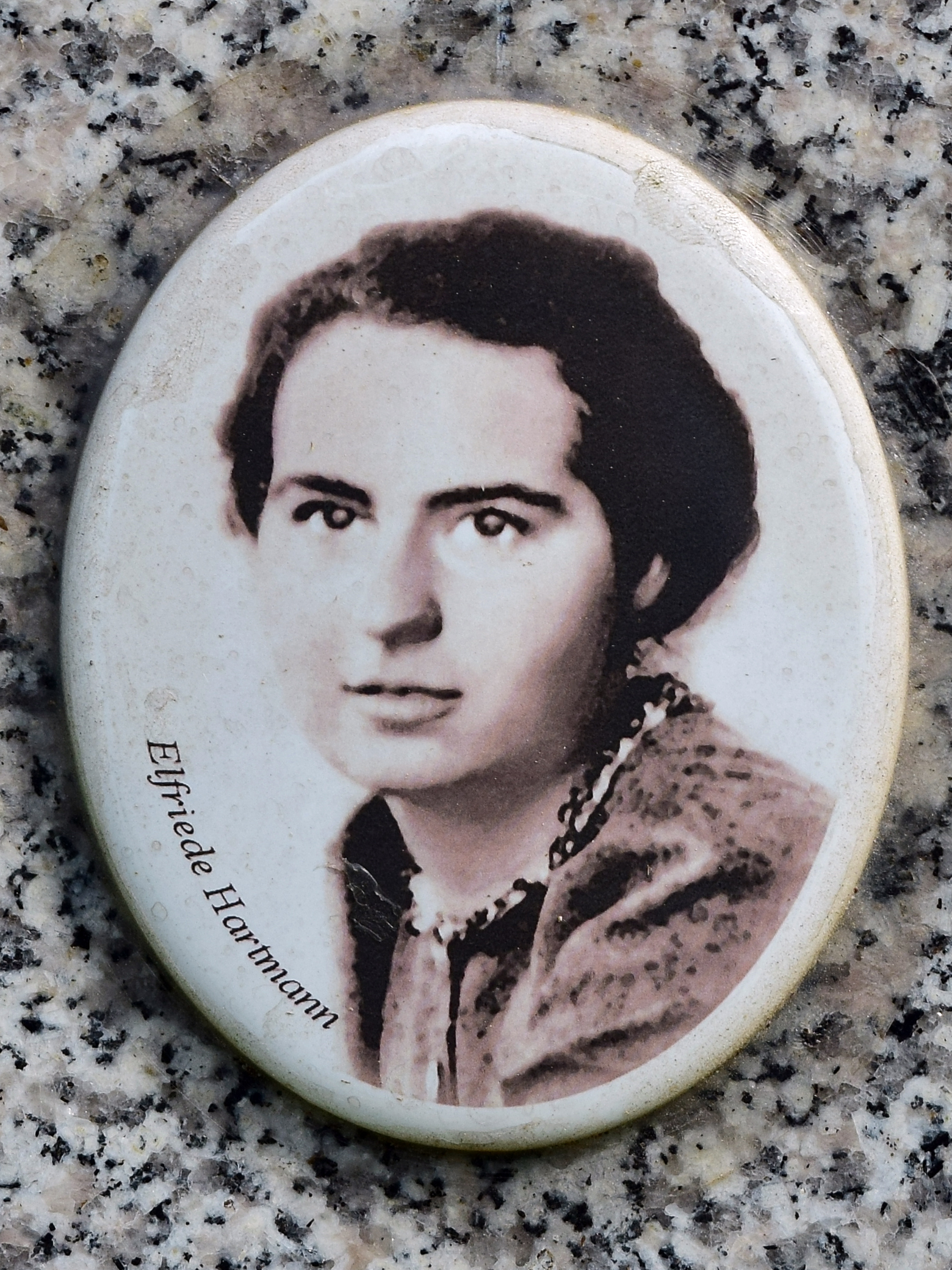
- Born: Elfriede Beate Hartmann; 21 May 1921; Vienna, Austria
- Died: 2 November 1943 (aged 22); Vienna, Austria
- Education: University of Vienna
- Occupations: Chemistry student Resistance activist
- Known for: having been convicted of treason and executed
- Political party: KJVD
- Partner: Rudolf Masl
- Parent(s): Alexander Herbert Hartmann; Hermine Schiefer

Elfriede Beate Hartmann (21 May 1921 – 2 November 1943) was a Viennese chemistry student. Towards the end of 1938, some months after the rapid integration of "Austro-fascist" Austria into a newly enlarged German state under the leadership of Adolf Hitler, she became involved with the Young Communists. After war broke out in 1939 she engaged actively in anti-war resistance. On 22 February 1942 she was caught distributing "leaflets" in a park in Vienna-Döbling and arrested. She faced trial at the special "People's Court" at Krems on 22 September 1943 and was found guilty of "preparing to commit High Treason and Helping the Enemy" ("Vorbereitung zum Hochverrat und Feindbegünstigung"). She died on the guillotine.

== Life and death ==
Hartmann grew up with her parents and elder sister, Gerda, in Döbling, a prosperous quarter of Vienna on the northern side of the city centre. Alexander Herbert Hartmann, her father, was an insurance company officer of Hungarian provenance. Her mother, born Hermine Schiefer, was a handicraft teacher. She attended the girls' secondary school in the Billrothstraße, near her home, passing her "Matura" (school final exams) in 1939. Upon leaving school, she worked for some months both at "Fuchs, Meindl und Horn", a prestigious fashion house and embroidery business in the city centre, and at "Hübner & Mayer", a machinery and boiler manufacturer located on the northern edge of town near the Hartmanns' home.

In January 1940, she enrolled at the university to study for a degree in Chemistry. In May or June, she was forced to abandon the university course, however, having been identified as a Class 1 "Mischling". The reference was to her racial provenance. The so-called Nuremberg Laws of 1935 had been implemented with increasing fervour on the part of the authorities in Vienna since Austria's incorporation into Germany, and although her father had been baptised as a Protestant in 1909 or 1910, the authorities chose to regard him as Jewish, and applied the race-based discriminatory laws to deprive his daughter of her university place. She was nevertheless able to earn a living through private tutoring in Mathematics. (Elfriede's mother was identified by the authorities as "Aryan", which according to at least one source is what later saved her father from deportation. Both Elfriede and her elder sister, Gerda, were baptised into the majority church – in Austria – as Roman Catholics.)

By this time Hartmann was living with her friend-partner, Rudolf Masl, (Note: The name "Masl" is a Czech language name: there is no agreement between German and English language sources on how to spell it. Rudolf Masl may also be identified in sources as Rudolf Mašl or Rudolf Maschl.) a skilled construction worker by trade, and one year older than she was. She had already been introduced into the Young Communists the previous Autumn/Fall, possibly by Masl, or possibly by a school friend. It is clear that she was not introduced to left-wing political activism by her father. She very quickly became involved in political organisation, becoming the Young Communists' leader for "District 3", encompassing a slice of south-west Vienna that covered five postal districts and included the city's main railway station. She was additionally in charge of sustaining contact with the Young Communist groups in Salzburg, Linz and St. Polten. Germany had been a one-party dictatorship since 1933 and there had been equivalent political developments in Austria during and since 1933. Hartmann's "underground" political activism on behalf of a Communist organisation was against the rules, enforcement of which was intensified after the outbreak of war in September 1939.

Early in 1941, Hartmann resigned her functions with the Young Communists in order to concentrate, with a handful of comrades, on setting up a so-called "Lit-Apparat" or "Lit-Stelle" (which was Communist Party jargon of the time and place for an operation to print and distribute political literature). They began to produce "Die Rote Jugend" ("Red Youth"), a resistance anti-war newspaper much of which was authored by herself. Hartmann's cover name within the "underground" communist movement was "Paula".

Hartmann was also a member of the young communist resistance group "Der Soldatenrat", named after the workers' and soldiers' soviets that had emerged in Germany after the previous "world war". Other members of the group included Anna Gräf, Leopoldine Kovarik and Alfred Rabofsky. All of them, like Hartmann, would have been sentenced to death and executed by the time the war ended. The group had their own "underground" newspaper, dedicated to urging military conscripts and others in the army to desert the German army and cross over to join the Soviet army. It was Hartmann who composed the letter - described in some sources as a leaflet - that she addressed to members of the army She organised the large scale production of copies and co-ordinated their distribution. An early attempt to distribute the missives using the military mail service failed when they were blocked. It turned out that the key to unblocking the mail service was to be able to identify each individual soldier by his unique "military mail reference number" ("Feldpostnummer"). By this time her partner, Rudolf Masl, was in Norway, having been conscripted for military service on the frontline. He was able to obtain and pass on the necessary individual reference numbers for more than a thousand serving soldiers. These he handed over when he was briefly home on leave in Vienna in the Autumn/Fall of 1941.

Between October 1941 and February 1942, many more envelopes were addressed to soldiers and civilian personnel in order to send out more leaflets urging desertions. Elfriede Hartmann was betrayed to the authorities, almost certainly by a government informer who had infiltrated him or herself into the little resistance group of which she was a part. She was arrested by security service personnel in the Döblinger Park on 24 February 1942. At the time of her arrest she reported to be was in possession of [political] leaflets which she was deemed to be distributing (probably by discretely leaving them on park benches). She was taken to the main police complex on the "Elisabethpromenade" alongside the "Donaukanal" and detained for "questioning".

Rudolf Masl was arrested three months later. Despite undergoing brutal interrogations, both Masl and Hartmann tried desperately to exonerate one another. Masl insisted that he had given Hartmann all the address details of the soldiers on the "mailing list" uninvited, while Hartmann insisted she had copied them without his knowledge. When she learned that Masl had confessed to his interrogators she smuggled messages out of her prison insisting that he should withdraw his confession. After she learned that her partner had been condemned to death, she smuggled out of her cell a succession of impassioned notes, mostly addressed to her parents, scrawled in tiny handwriting on the back of dockets. She urged the recipients to intercede with the authorities, stating that any wrongdoing on Masl's part had occurred only because he was infatuated with her and completely under her influence. The charge would be the usual one of "preparing to commit High Treason and Helping the Enemy" ("Vorbereitung zum Hochverrat und Feindbegünstigung").

Despite having been arrested several months later, Masl was the first of the couple to face the court. On 17 March 1943, Elfriede Hartmann was called upon to testify at his trial. She used the opportunity to renew her attempt to exonerate Masl, insisting that she alone was responsible for any alleged wrongdoing. Masl was nevertheless found guilty and sentenced to death by the special People's Court at Krems. The sentence was carried out on 27 August 1943, using the guillotine that had been installed for the purpose at the Vienna district court complex back in 1938.

Hartmann's own trial took place at the People's Court on 22 September 1943. She was one of two people tried at the same time. The co-defendant was Friedrich Mastny, a comrade from the same resistance group as she. Both defendants were convicted and condemned to death. The court dismissed as inadmissible an application for a re-trial.

On 2 November 1943, Elfrieda Hartmann was executed by guillotine at the Vienna district court complex.

== Commemoration ==
On the Masl family grave in the Hirschstetten Cemetery there is a memorial stone for Elfriede Hartmann and her partner Rudolf Masl. (Note: Group E, Row 3, Grave 52) Her name also appears on one of the memorial tablets in the former execution room at the Vienna district court.
