= Břežany I =

- Municipality
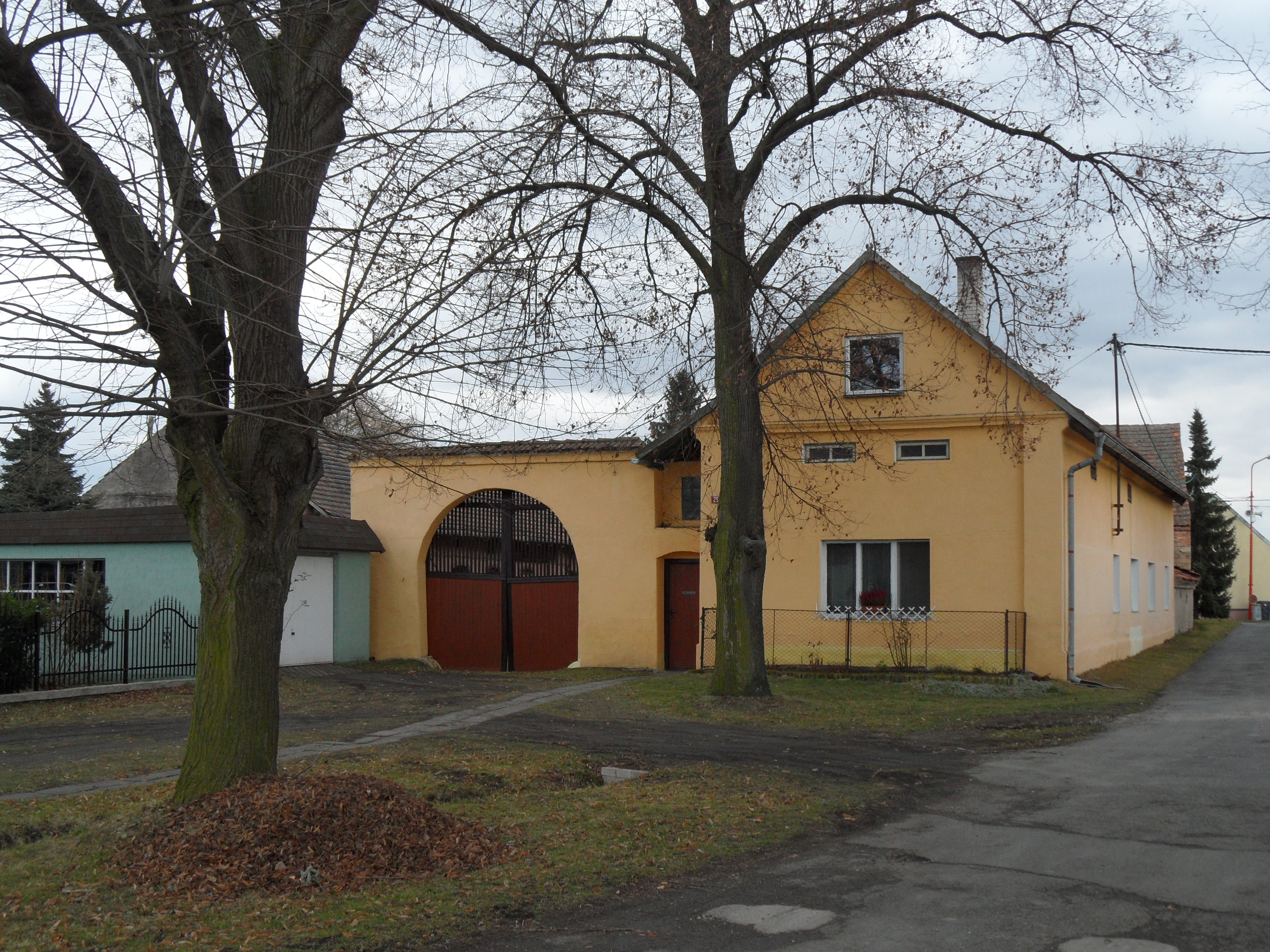
- Old farmhouse

- Location in the Czech Republic
- Coordinates: 50°2′6″N 15°4′44″E
- Country: Czech Republic
- Region: Central Bohemian
- District: Kolín
- First mentioned: 1088

Area
  - Total: 6.03 km^{2} (2.33 sq mi)
- Elevation: 240 m (790 ft)

Population (2026-01-01)
  - Total: 315
  - Density: 52.2/km^{2} (135/sq mi)
- Time zone: UTC+1 (CET)
  - Summer (DST): UTC+2 (CEST)
- Postal code: 280 02
- Website: www.brezany1.cz

Břežany I is a municipality and village in Kolín District in the Central Bohemian Region of the Czech Republic. It has about 300 inhabitants.

The Roman numeral in the name serves to distinguish it from the nearby municipality of the same name, Břežany II.

== Administrative division ==
Břežany I consists of two municipal parts (in brackets population according to the 2021 census):

- Břežany I (198)
- Chocenice (99)

== Demographics ==
Historical population
| Year | Pop. | ±% |
|---|---|---|
| 1869 | 831 | — |
| 1880 | 843 | +1.4% |
| 1890 | 877 | +4.0% |
| 1900 | 802 | −8.6% |
| 1910 | 797 | −0.6% |
| 1921 | 754 | −5.4% |
| 1930 | 686 | −9.0% |
| 1950 | 520 | −24.2% |
| 1961 | 438 | −15.8% |
| 1970 | 399 | −8.9% |
| 1980 | 361 | −9.5% |
| 1991 | 281 | −22.2% |
| 2001 | 289 | +2.8% |
| 2011 | 299 | +3.5% |
| 2021 | 297 | −0.7% |
Source: Censuses
