= Břežany (Znojmo District) =

- Municipality
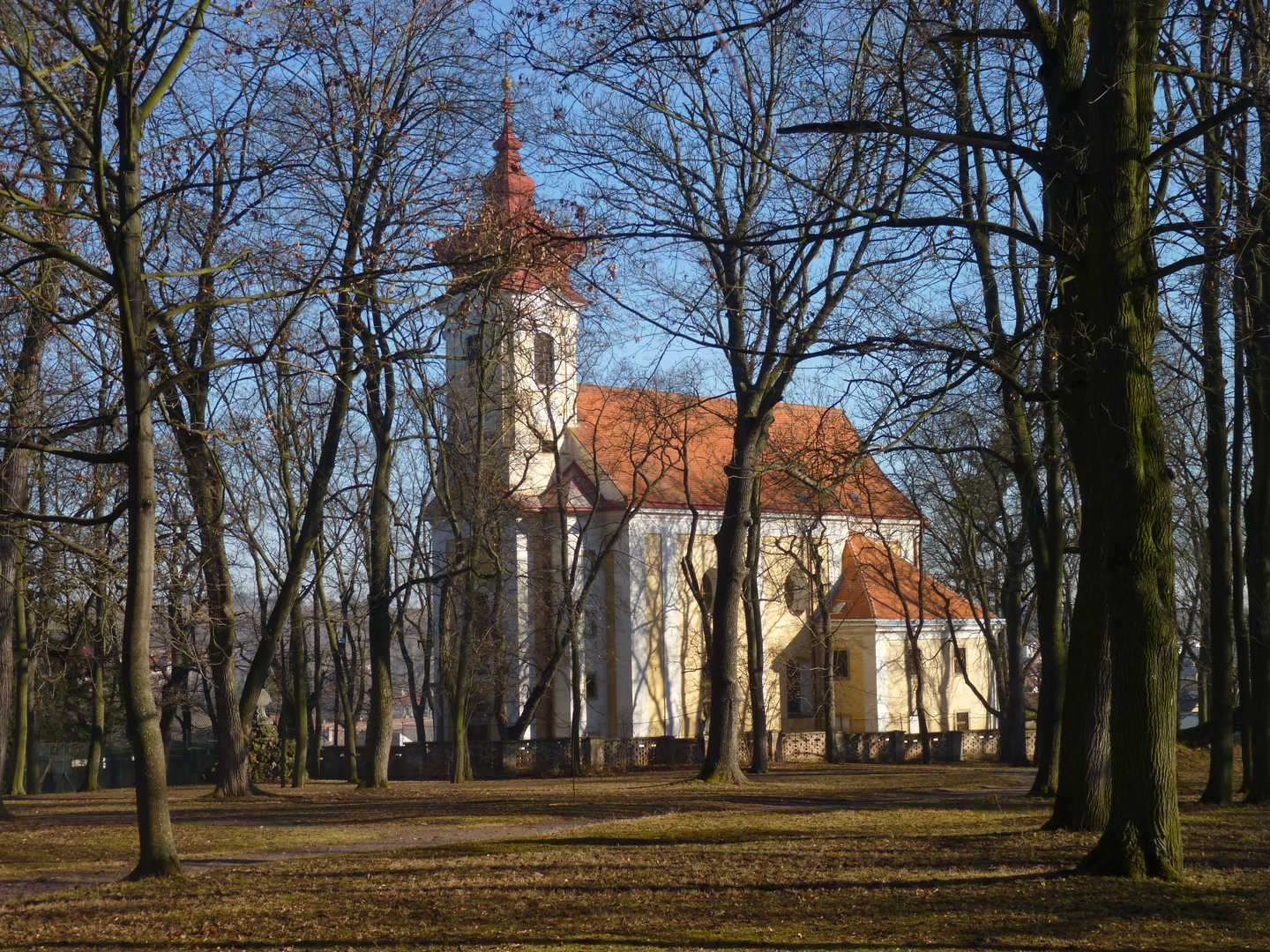
- Church of the Annunciation

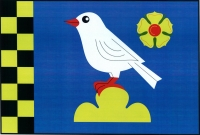
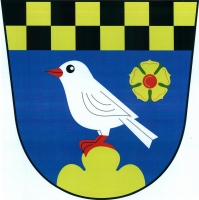
- Flag Coat of arms

- Location in the Czech Republic
- Coordinates: 48°52′12″N 16°20′30″E
- Country: Czech Republic
- Region: South Moravian
- District: Znojmo
- First mentioned: 1222

Area
  - Total: 16.39 km^{2} (6.33 sq mi)
- Elevation: 195 m (640 ft)

Population (2026-01-01)
  - Total: 807
  - Density: 49.2/km^{2} (128/sq mi)
- Time zone: UTC+1 (CET)
  - Summer (DST): UTC+2 (CEST)
- Postal code: 671 65
- Website: www.obec-brezany.cz

Břežany is a municipality and village in Znojmo District in the South Moravian Region of the Czech Republic. It has about 800 inhabitants.

Břežany lies approximately 23 kilometres (14 mi) east of Znojmo, 42 km (26 mi) south-west of Brno, and 194 km (121 mi) south-east of Prague.

== Demographics ==
Historical population
Year	Pop.	±%
1869	978	—
1880	972	−0.6%
1890	920	−5.3%
1900	1,000	+8.7%
1910	1,060	+6.0%
1921	1,064	+0.4%
1930	1,216	+14.3%
1950	881	−27.5%
1961	1,103	+25.2%
1970	1,060	−3.9%
1980	984	−7.2%
1991	904	−8.1%
2001	920	+1.8%
2011	882	−4.1%
2021	775	−12.1%
Source: Censuses
