= Leopoldine Kovarik =

Austrian Nazi resistance activist

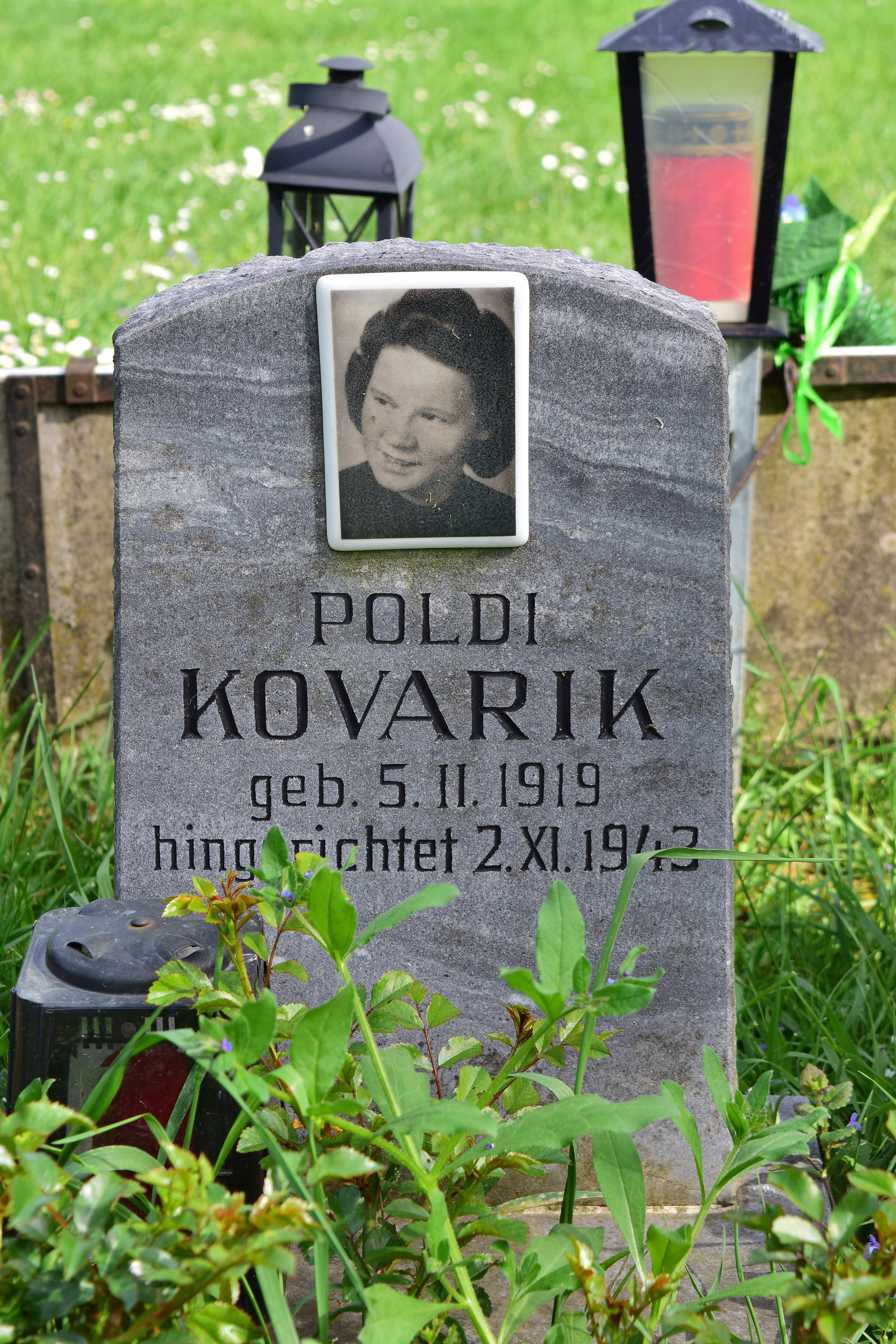
Leopoldine Kovarik's grave in Vienna's (misleadingly named) Central Cemetery

Leopoldine Kovarik (5 February 1919 – 2 November 1943) was a post office employee who lived and worked in a suburb on the south side of Vienna. After Austria was merged into Nazi Germany she became a resistance activist. During the Second World War she became a member of a group which used to write letters to members of the army encouraging them to desert. Aged 24, she was convicted under the usual charge of "preparing to commit high treason" ("Vorbereitung zum Hochverrat") and guillotined at Vienna's regional penitentiary, which had incorporated its own execution chamber since the aftermath of the short-lived uprising of 1934.

== Life ==
Leopoldine "Poldi" Kovarik was born in Vienna. Even as a school girl she was politically engaged, involving herself in the (Socialist) Children's Friends movement, subsequently joining up to the Young Socialist Workers. After Austria's multi-party democratic system had been superseded by the so-called "Ständestaat" in 1934 she switched to the Young Communists.

During the Austrofascist period, between 1934 and 1938, Kovarik was twice arrested on account of her political activities. By 1938 she was aged 19, and employed as a post office official, assigned to work for the post office savings bank ("Postparkasse"). 1938 was the year of the "Anschluss". Many welcomed the incorporation of Austria into Nazi Germany, but those on the political left did not. She joined a Soldiers' Council ("Soldatenrat") Young Communist group led by Alfred Rabofsky. During the war the "Soldatenrat" specialised in writing and sending letters to members of the army, calling upon them to desert. Other members of the group alongside Kovarik were Anna Gräf and Elfriede Hartmann who were both, like Rabofsky himself, executed before 1945. In her apartment in Vienna-Favoriten she organised the paper work for the "soldier work". She was in addition responsible for communications with resistance group members in Graz, in the south of the country.

Leopoldine Kovarik was also a supporter of the leading Austrian communist, Leo Gabler (1908-1944) who had returned from Moscow via Yugoslavia in 1941 in order the rebuild the destroyed party with a new leadership team. (As a result of the Molotov–Ribbentrop Pact of 1939, exiled Austrian communists leaders, including KPÖ founder member Franz Koritschoner, had previously been deported from the Soviet Union where they had taken refuge and handed over to the Nazis.)

== Trial and death ==
The court was particularly concerned with the letters that Kovarik had been sending to soldiers. This is an extract.

- "I ask that you help me put an end to the mass-murder. The real enemy is not the Red army: the real enemy is in our own country: the greed of the Germans and the other capitalists! Refuse to die for the profit of the rich. Make brothers of all the people across the world who are bringing down capitalism with blood and arms. This is the way to peace.

We condemn this war and with it the fine gentlemen who bear the guilt for this mass-killing. You are men: you must see how this accursed war brings us only misery and hunger, and means bondage and enslavement to other nations... Throw down the weapons and do not fight against people who have done you no harm. Be like our fathers in 1918 and return home before it is too late. Do not fight against the free people of Russia, but fight against our own oppressors, against our own bourgeoisie."

- "Ich bitte dich, hilf mir Schluß zu machen mit dem Massenmorden. Nicht die Rote Armee ist der Feind, sondern der Feind steht im eigenen Lande: Die Machtgier der deutschen und übrigen Kapitalisten! Weigert euch u sterben für den Profit der Reichen. Verbrüdert euch mit allen Völkern der Welt, die der Kapitalismus mit Blut und Waffen niederhält. Diese ist der Weg zum Frieden!

Wir verfluchen diesen Krieg und damit die Herren, die an diesem Massenmorden Schuld tragen. Ihr seid doch Männer, ihr müsst doch wissen, wie diesem verfluchten Krieg, der uns nur Hunger und Elend bringt, den anderen Völkern aber Knechtschaft und Sklaverei bedeutet, der Garaus zu machen ist. Streckt die Waffen und kämpft nicht gegen ein Volk, das euch gar nichts zu leide getan hat. Macht es so wie unsere Väter 1918 und kehrt heim, solaren es noch nicht zu spät ist. Kämpft nicht gegen die freien Menschen Russlands, sondern kämpft gegen die eigenen Unterdrücker, gegen die eigene Bourgoisie."

On 13 November 1941, while visiting Berlin, Leopoldine Kovarik was arrested. There was evidently no sense of urgency about bringing her to trial, but on 27 September 1943 she faced the special "People's Court" and found guilty of "preparing to commit high treason" ("Vorbereitung zum Hochverrat"). Above all the court found that she had been engaged in "production and distribution of treasonable letters intended for despatch to members of the army". The court also found that she had often met with [the Communist leader, Leo Gabler] and had learned from him of plans to rebuild the Austrian Communist Party in Vienna. After that she had acted as a contact between Gabler and other "Communist officials" or like-minded comrades such as [Friedrich] Hedrich and [Ernst] Rousek. She herself had also participated in meeting with Gabler and these other "co-communists" in connection with the political situation and their "illegal work".

Her death sentence was carried out on 2 November 1943. using the guillotine that had been installed some years earlier at Vienna's regional penitentiary.
