= Krušovice =

- Municipality
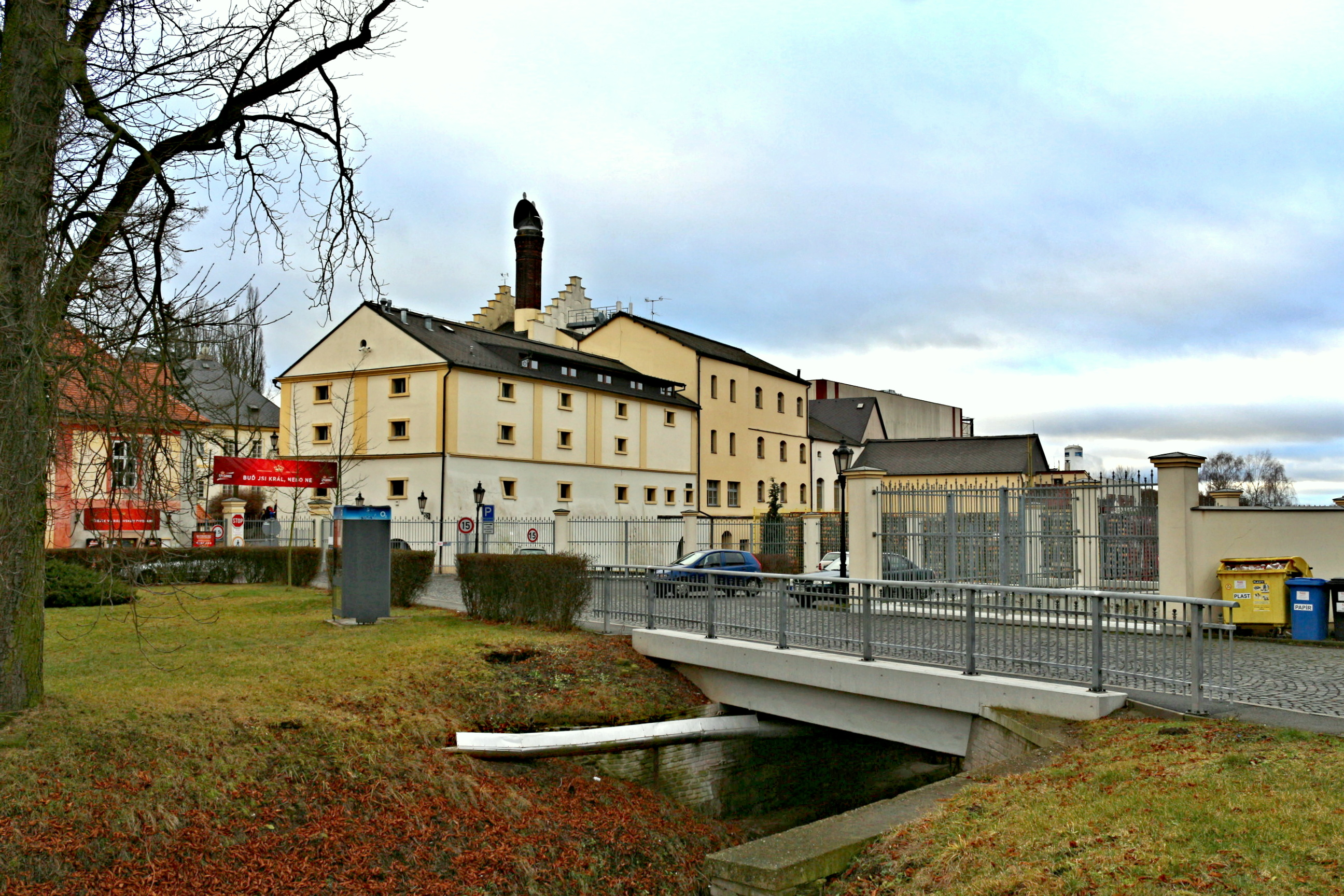
- Royal Brewery of Krušovice

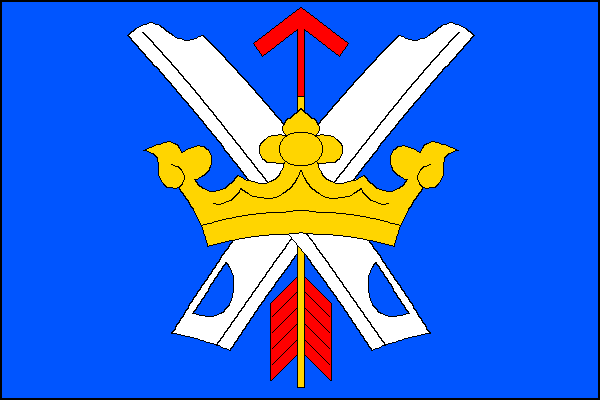
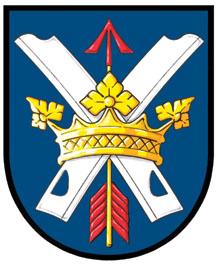
- Flag Coat of arms

- Location in the Czech Republic
- Coordinates: 50°10′19″N 13°46′34″E
- Country: Czech Republic
- Region: Central Bohemian
- District: Rakovník
- First mentioned: 1278

Area
  - Total: 6.36 km^{2} (2.46 sq mi)
- Elevation: 379 m (1,243 ft)

Population (2026-01-01)
  - Total: 634
  - Density: 99.7/km^{2} (258/sq mi)
- Time zone: UTC+1 (CET)
  - Summer (DST): UTC+2 (CEST)
- Postal code: 270 53
- Website: www.obec-krusovice.cz

Krušovice is a municipality and village in Rakovník District in the Central Bohemian Region of the Czech Republic. It has about 600 inhabitants.

== Etymology ==
The initial name of the village was Krušejovice. It was derived from the personal name Krušej, meaning "the village of Krušej's people".

== Geography ==
Krušovice is located about 8 kilometres (5 mi) north of Rakovník and 40 km (25 mi) west of Prague. It lies mostly in the Džbán range, but it also extends into the Rakovník Uplands in the west. The highest point is at 498 m (1,634 ft) above sea level.

== History ==
The first written mention of Krušovice is in a deed dating from the reign of King Ottokar (1253–1278). The village was owned by various lesser noblemen until 1583, when Emperor Rudolf II bought it to unify the Křivoklát estate. The beer brewing was first documented in 1581. During the Thirty Years' War, Krušovice was damaged and depleted, and it took a long time to recover from the effects of the war.

In 1686, the estate was bought by Arnošt Josef of Waldstein. During his rule, Krušovice developed considerably. The Waldstein family owned the Křivoklát estate until 1733, when it was acquired by the Fürstenberg family. The Fürstenbergs owned Krušovice until the establishment of an independent municipality.

== Demographics ==
Historical population

Year	Pop.	±%
1869	898	—
1880	998	+11.1%
1890	853	−14.5%
1900	869	+1.9%
1910	934	+7.5%

Year	Pop.	±%
1921	869	−7.0%
1930	844	−2.9%
1950	624	−26.1%
1961	624	+0.0%
1970	588	−5.8%

Year	Pop.	±%
1980	569	−3.2%
1991	518	−9.0%
2001	558	+7.7%
2011	614	+10.0%
2021	586	−4.6%

Source: Censuses

== Economy ==
Krušovice is known for Royal Brewery of Krušovice, the historic brewery where Krušovice beer is brewed.

== Transport ==
The D6 motorway (part of the European route E48), which connects Prague with Karlovy Vary, Cheb and the Czech–German border, runs through the municipality.

== Sights ==
The main landmark is the Krušovice Castle. It is a large Baroque building, built around 1711 according to the project by the architect František Maxmilián Kaňka. Adjacent to the castle is the Chapel of the Holy Trinity from the 1730s.

== Notable people ==
- Charles Egon IV, Prince of Fürstenberg (1852–1896), German prince
- Václav Rabas (1885–1954), painter
