= List of supermarket chains in the Czech Republic =

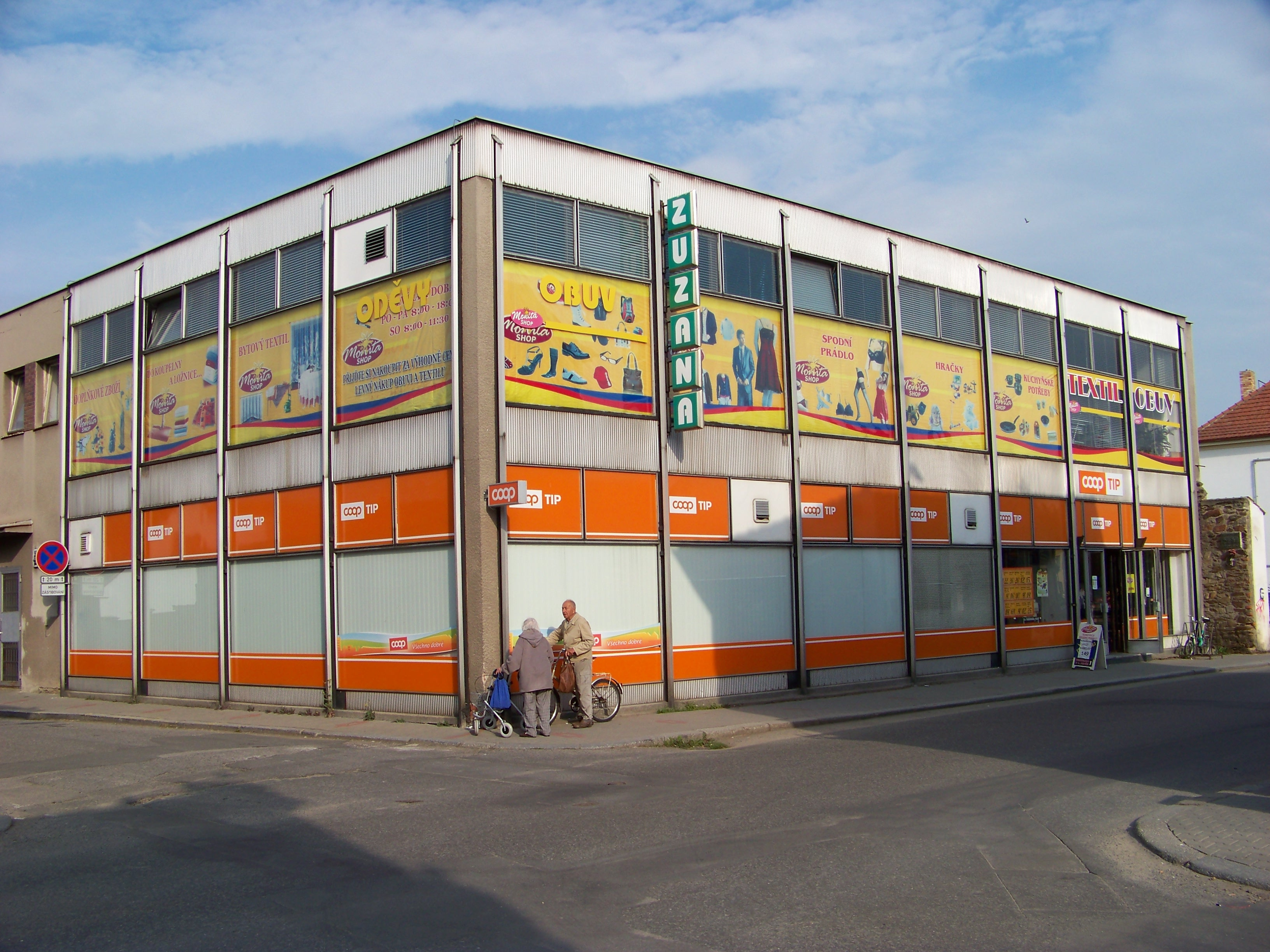
Coop in the Czech Republic.

This is a list of supermarket chains in the Czech Republic.

== Supermarkets ==
=== Active ===
Name	Stores	Type of stores	Parent / operator
Albert	350	supermarket and hypermarket	Ahold Delhaize
Billa	296	supermarket	REWE Group
CBA	1,300+	supermarket and convenience	CBA CZ
COOP	2,500+	supermarket and convenience	Skupina Coop
Globus	20	hypermarket and small-format supermarket	Globus Holding
Hruška	430+	supermarket and convenience	Central European Retail Holding (Oriens)
Kaufland	149	hypermarket	Schwarz Gruppe
Lidl	326	discount supermarket	Schwarz Gruppe
Norma	50+	discount supermarket	Norma
Penny Market	444+	discount supermarket	REWE Group
PLUS JIP	140+	supermarket and convenience	PLUS JIP
Tesco	184	hypermarket, supermarket and convenience	Tesco
Žabka	126	convenience	Tesco

=== Defunct ===
Name	Stores	Type of stores	Parent
Carrefour		hypermarket	
Edeka		supermarket	
Enapo	338	convenience	Enapo Obchodní
Iceland		supermarket	private
Julius Meinl		supermarket	
Plus		supermarket	
Vít potraviny		supermarket	private

== Speciality chains ==
=== Hobby markets & DIY stores ===
Name	Stores	Parent
Mountfield	55	Mountfield a.s.
OBI	37	Tengelmann Group
BauMax	18	(Poland) Norweska Grupa Inwestycyjna S.A.
Hornbach	8	Kingfisher plc

=== Home improvement stores ===
Name	Stores	Parent
Jysk	94	Jysk
ASKO nábytek	13	PORTA
SCONTO nábytek	9	Sconto SB Der Möbelmarkt GmbH
Möbelix	14	Möbelix
XXXLutz	7	XXXLutz
IKEA	4	Stichting INGKA Foundation

=== Drugstore chains ===
Name	Stores	Parent
TETA drogerie	450	TETA drogerie
Dm	221	dm-drogerie markt
Rossmann	118	Rossmann
TOP Drogerie	350+	Top Drogery

== See also ==
- List of supermarkets
- List of supermarket chains in Europe
