= Royal Brewery of Krušovice =

Czech brewery

Královský pivovar Krušovice

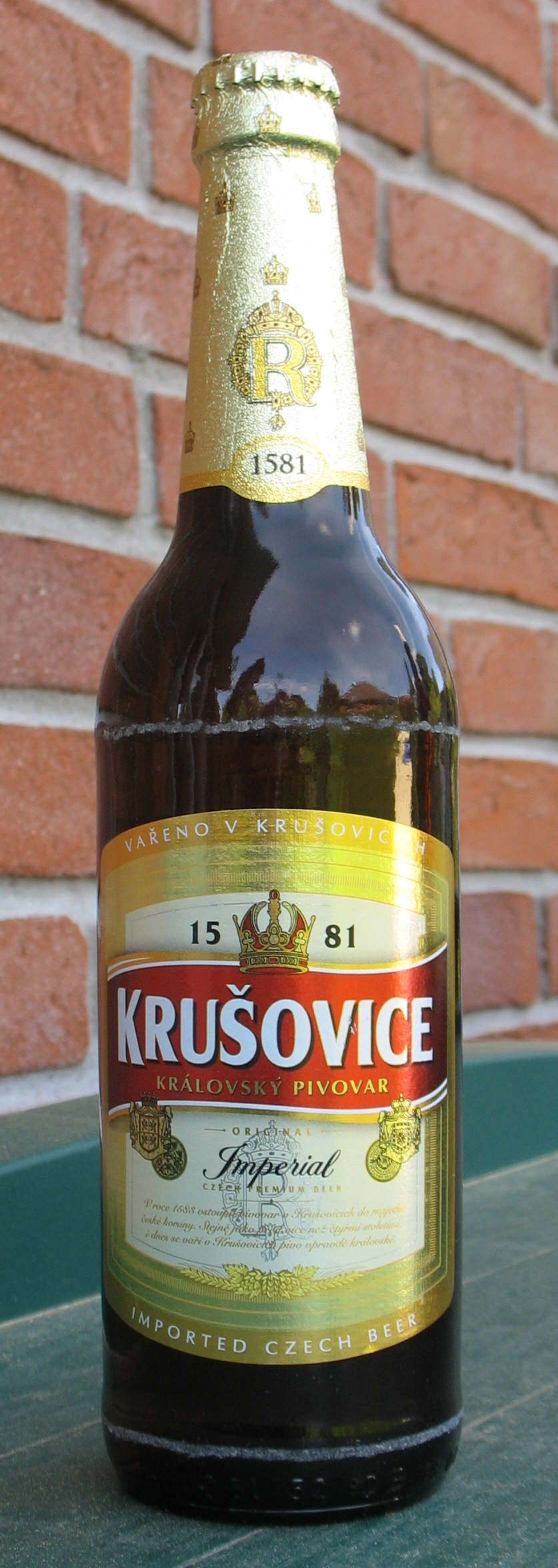
- Krušovice beer
- Location: Krušovice, Czech Republic
- Coordinates: 50°10′12″N 13°46′12″E
- Opened: 1581
- Owned by: Heineken N.V.
- Website: krusovice.cz

The Royal Brewery of Krušovice (Czech: Královský pivovar Krušovice, short form Krušovice) is a Czech brewery, established in 1581 in Krušovice.

== History ==
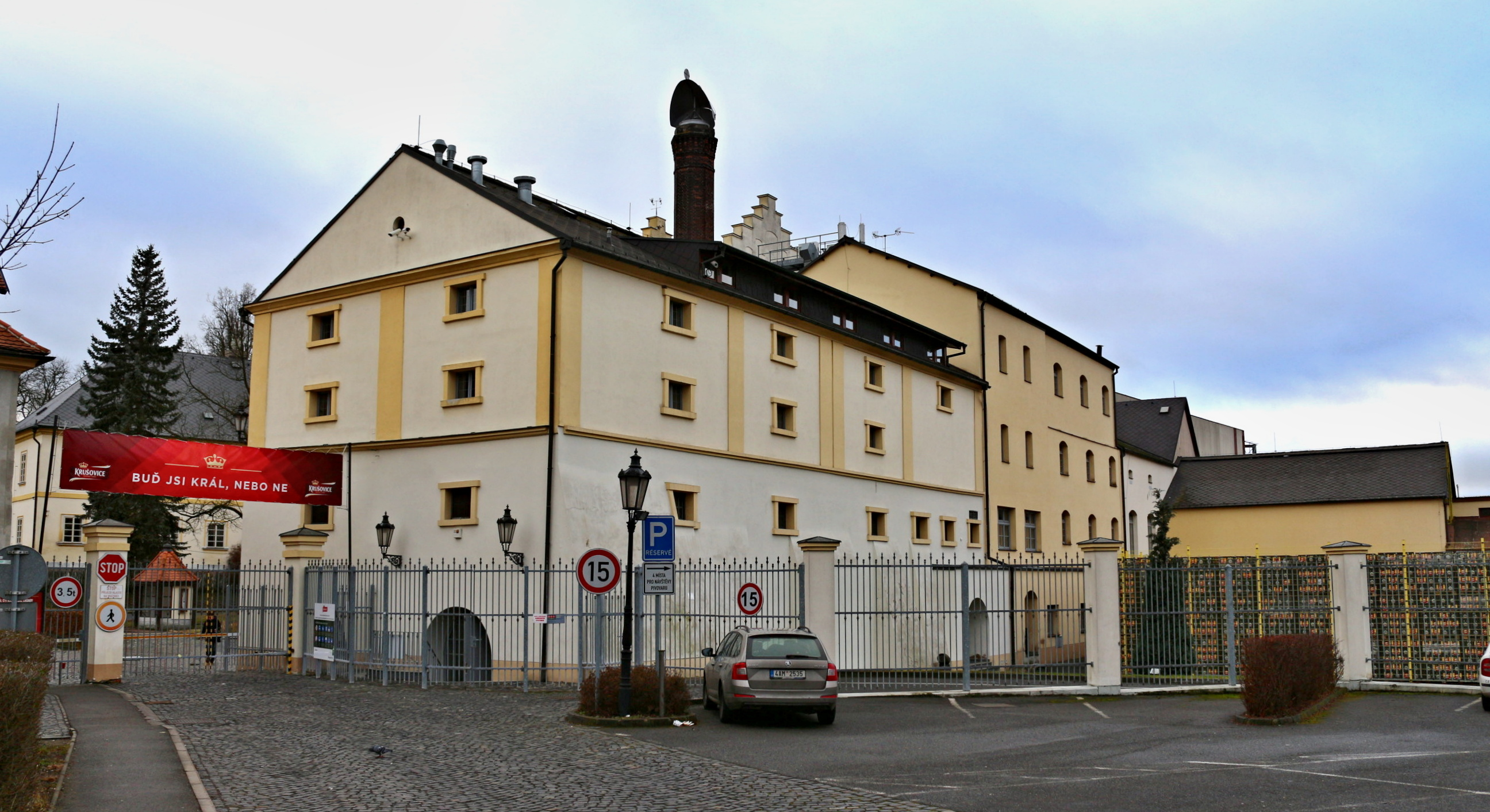
Krušovic Brewery building

The brewery was established in 1581. It was sold to Emperor Rudolf II in 1583, and the Imperial Crown of Austria became part of the company's logo. Arnošt Josef Waldstein bought the brewery in 1685.

After 1945, the Krušovice Brewery was a state-owned company. The brewery was privatised in 1993, and began exporting to the United States and United Kingdom. The company was acquired by Heineken N.V. in 2007.

== Brands ==
- Krušovice 10 – a pale 10.3° draught beer with 4.2% ABV
- Krušovice Lager – a pale 12° lager with 4.8% ABV
- Krušovice 12 – a pale 12.3° lager with 5.0% ABV
- Krušovice Dark – a dark 9.7° beer with 3.8% ABV
- Krušovice Mušketýr Filtr – a pale 10.9° draught beer with 4.5% ABV.
- Krušovice Mušketýr Nefiltr – an unfiltered 11.8° lager with 4.9% ABV.
- Krušovice Malvaz – a semi-dark 13° lager with 5.6% ABV
- Krušovice Pšeničné – an unfiltered 11.5° wheat beer with 4.3% ABV.

== See also ==
- Beer in the Czech Republic
