= Alpine Pro =

Sportswear manufacturer

ALPINE PRO
- Industry: Sportswear; Sports goods
- Founded: 1994; 32 years ago
- Founder: Václav Hrbek; Vladislav Fedoš
- Headquarters: Prague, Czech Republic
- Products: Athletic shoes; Clothing; Sports equipment; Accessories
- Website: alpinepro.com

Alpine Pro is a sportswear brand of shoes and apparel. The company was founded by Václav Hrbek and Vladislav Fedoš. It first supplied sportswear to the Czech Olympic team at the 2010 Winter Olympics and 2012 Summer Olympics; in 2018 the company supplied the team for the fifth consecutive Games. For the 2018 Winter Olympics, the firm produced more than 200,000 items for its Olympic collection, including the iconic Raškovka hat, named after skijumper Jiří Raška. The brand, which had 54 Czech stores in 2020, also expanded internationally, opening its 15th store in Poland in 2022.
