= Poldi Hirsch =

American architect and politician (1926–1987)

- Born: Poldi Rothenberg; March 24, 1926; Remscheid
- Died: July 22, 1987 (aged 61); Havre de Grace
- Resting place: Hebrew Friendship Cemetery; Baltimore, Maryland, U.S.
- Occupation: Architect
- Children: 3

Poldi Hirsch (née Rothenberg; March 24, 1926 – July 22, 1987) was a German-born American architect who applied modernist principles to suburban houses and buildings in Havre de Grace, Maryland.

== Early life and education ==
Poldi Rothenberg was born on March 24, 1926, in Remscheid, Germany, the daughter of Isak Rottenberg and Malka Rottenberg. In 1939, she and her family fled Nazi Germany for Mandatory Palestine. She graduated from Herzliya Hebrew Gymnasium in Tel Aviv in 1946 and, encouraged by her father to pursue architecture, studied the subject for two years at the Hebrew Technical College, Haifa.

She met Günther Hirsch playing tennis in Tel Aviv in 1943. In 1948, she left college to join him in Geneva, Switzerland, where he was studying medicine, and they married. In Switzerland, she finished her architecture schooling: she attended the École d’Architecture in Geneva and the Uni-École Polytechnique of Lausanne, earning a Diplome d’Architect and receiving a license to practice architecture in Switzerland

In 1953, the Hirschs moved to Sewickley, Pennsylvania in the United States, where Hirsch worked as a model maker for H. Bradley-Patterson & Burgner Architects and her husband was a medical resident and earned a master's in public health.

== Havre de Grace ==
In 1955, the Hirschs permanently settled in Havre de Grace and began practicing in their respective professions.

Hirsch's work was in the tradition of Le Corbusier, with form following function, minimalist, and contemporary, not backward looking. She said "Contemporary is not the break-off; colonial was contemporary in its day" She designed a number of small homes, duplexes, and apartment buildings inspired by Le Courbusier's Unité d'habitation principle, combining modern design with affordability.

According to Selena Bagnara Milan, in the 1970s Hirsch's work show the influences of Frank Lloyd Wright and Alvar Aalto. "...[S]he embraced the so called ‘vernacular style,’ combining geometry with bold colours and organic elements. She fused technology with tradition and craft, bringing to the design of her interiors a regional flavour, taking advantage of site, natural light, and ventilation." This work culminated in Hirsch's own family residence, which:

illustrated Poldi’s conception of beauty, characterized by functionalism interwoven with rhythm, light, and colour to create a vital and dynamic experience. The house, which floorplan is organized with a strong connection with the exterior, offers moments of relax[ation] and privacy using traditional architectural elements in a new way, but also hosts a doctor’s office for Dr Hirsch, and becomes the place for establishing her professional practice –Poldi Hirsch AIA & Associates– which will remain, to quote a classic in women’s literature, ‘a room of her own’.

== Personal life and legacy ==
Hirsch and her husband had three daughters. She died on July 22, 1987, in Havre de Grace. She was buried in Hebrew Friendship Cemetery in Baltimore. After his wife's death, Günther Hirsch served two terms of mayor of Havre de Grace and wrote two books, From Exile to Life and Sick! Patients First.
