= Nové Sedlo (Louny District) =

- Municipality
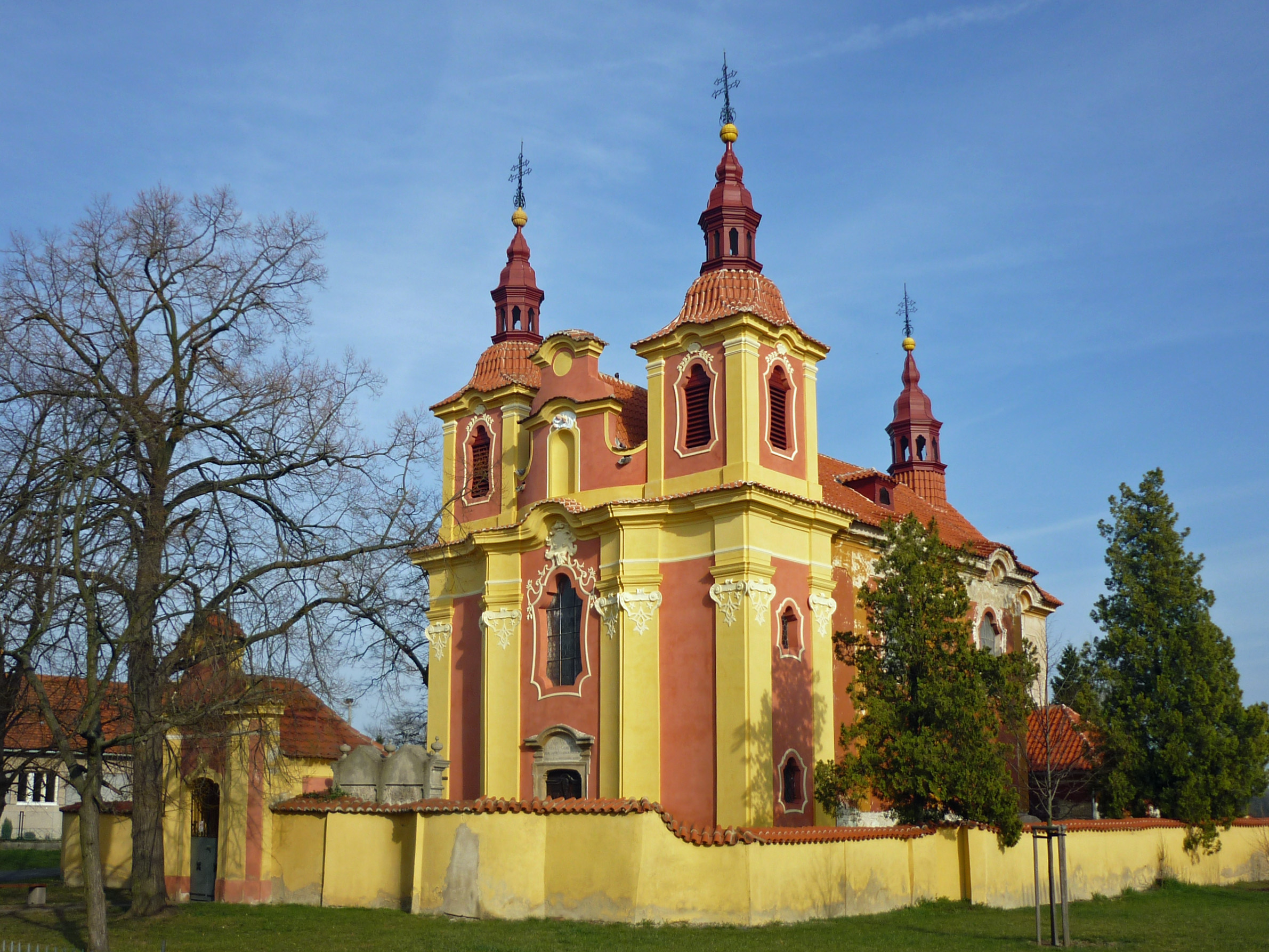
- Church of Saint Wenceslaus

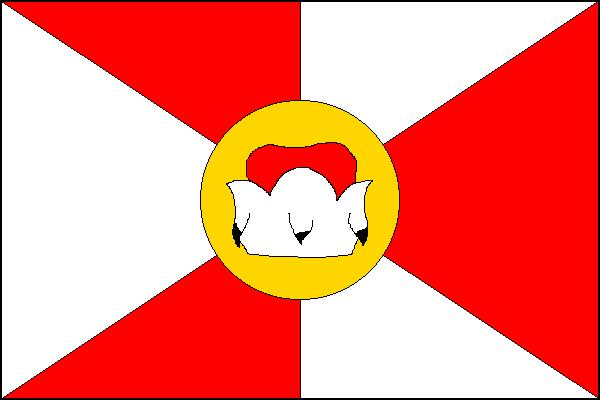
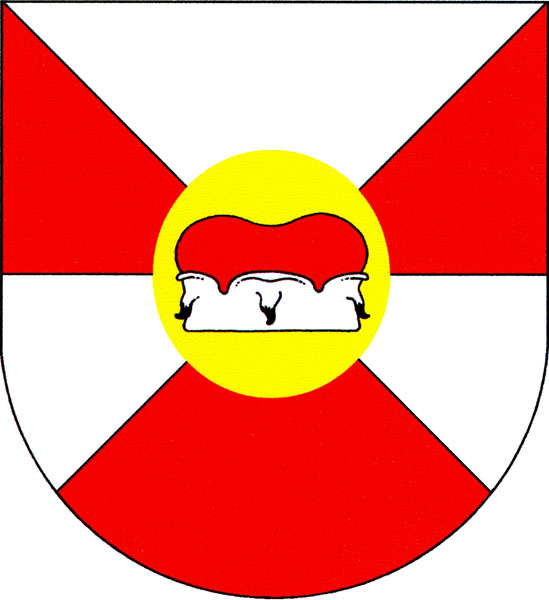
- Flag Coat of arms

- Location in the Czech Republic
- Coordinates: 50°20′23″N 13°28′30″E
- Country: Czech Republic
- Region: Ústí nad Labem
- District: Louny
- First mentioned: 1411

Area
  - Total: 22.05 km^{2} (8.51 sq mi)
- Elevation: 225 m (738 ft)

Population (2026-01-01)
  - Total: 589
  - Density: 26.7/km^{2} (69.2/sq mi)
- Time zone: UTC+1 (CET)
  - Summer (DST): UTC+2 (CEST)
- Postal code: 438 01
- Website: www.nove-sedlo.cz

Nové Sedlo (German: Neusattel bei Saaz) is a municipality and village in Louny District in the Ústí nad Labem Region of the Czech Republic. It has about 600 inhabitants.

== Administrative division ==
Nové Sedlo consists of six municipal parts (in brackets population according to the 2021 census):

- Nové Sedlo (724)
- Břežany (42)
- Chudeřín (13)
- Číňov (12)
- Sedčice (124)
- Žabokliky (34)

== Demographics ==
Historical population
Year	Pop.	±%
1869	1,117	—
1880	1,343	+20.2%
1890	1,263	−6.0%
1900	1,321	+4.6%
1910	1,260	−4.6%
1921	1,336	+6.0%
1930	1,521	+13.8%
1950	771	−49.3%
1961	773	+0.3%
1970	731	−5.4%
1980	581	−20.5%
1991	530	−8.8%
2001	535	+0.9%
2011	1,012	+89.2%
2021	949	−6.2%
Source: Censuses

== Notable people ==
- Eugen Gura (1842–1906), Austrian opera singer
