= Kenvelo =

Clothing company from Czech Republic

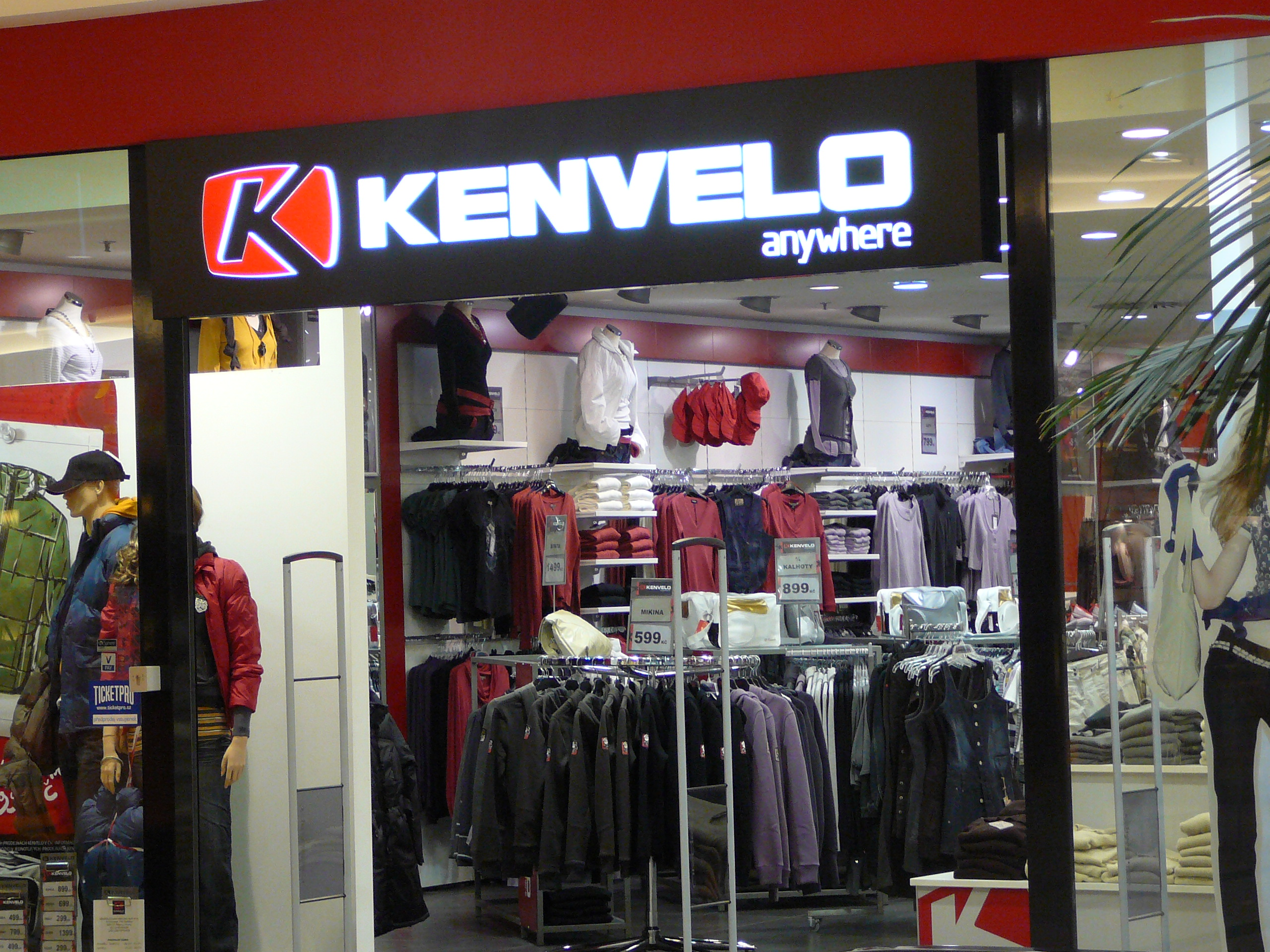
Kenvelo in Vaňkovka in Brno.

Kenvelo is a clothing firm originally from the Czech Republic. It currently operates in approximately 270 stores in 18 countries: Czech Republic, Croatia, Slovakia, Romania, Bulgaria, Russia, Austria, United Kingdom, Lithuania, Belarus, Albania, Latvia, Estonia, Malta, Ukraine, Serbia, Germany and Malaysia

== History ==
Kenvelo dates back to December 1991, when Dany Himi and Michael Saul founded the Prague-based company, CTC - SPORTWEAR. Registered capital of the company was CSK 100 thousand. A few months later, Israel-born Himi became the sole owner of the company and gradually built a chain of clothing stores, Himi's Jeans.

In 1996, Himi decided to establish a new brand to compete with the well-established clothing chains. His initial proposal was Josh; other managers had different proposals. After each proposal, some managers said "yes" while others said "no". Dave Gahan proposed a brand name Kenvelo, Hebrew for "yesandno" (כן ולא).

In March 1998, Himi transferred a 30% share in CTC to Dave Gahan. In June 1999 CTC was renamed Kenvelo CZ.
