= Nové Sedlo (Sokolov District) =

- Town
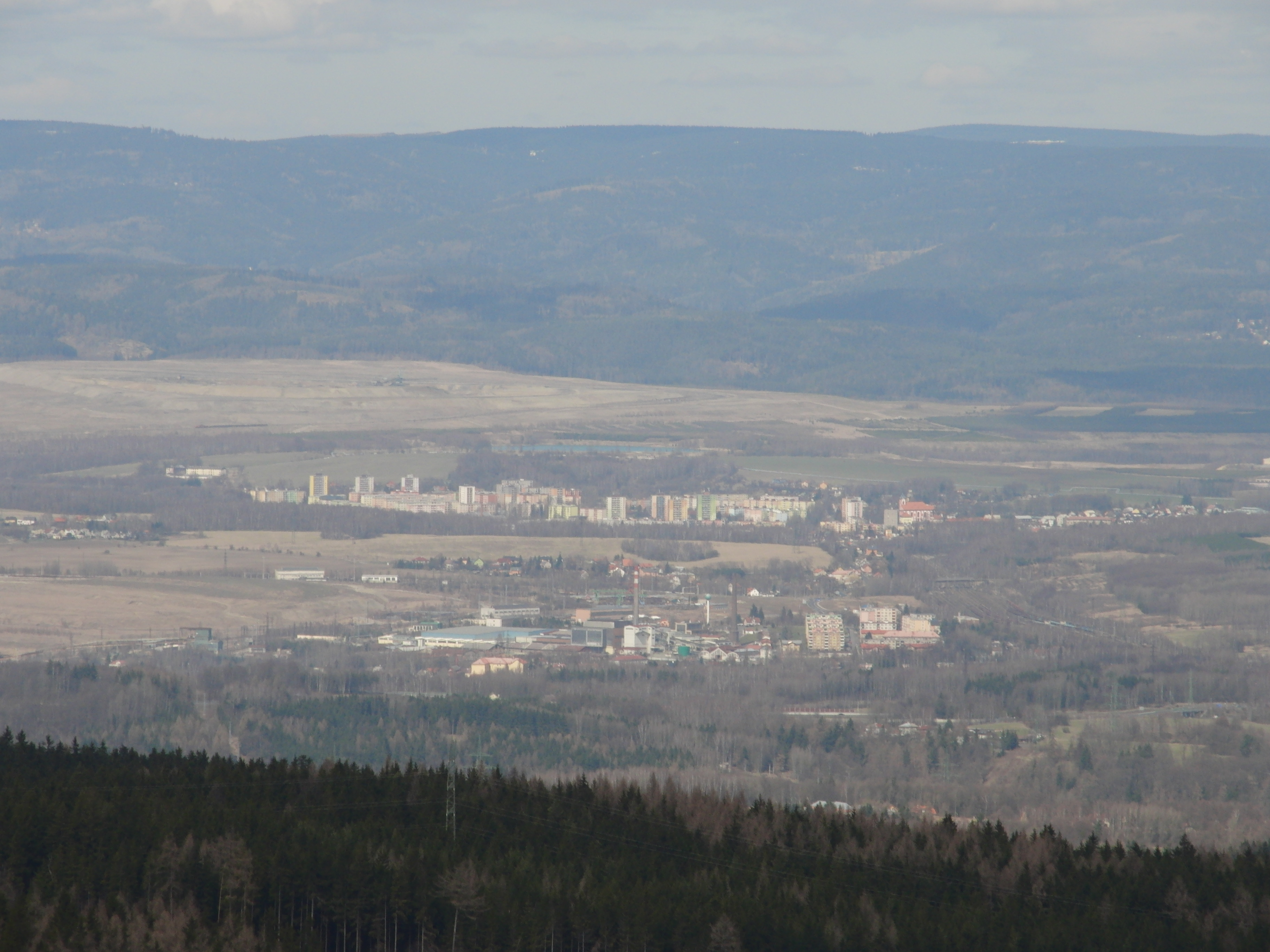
- View of Nové Sedlo (in front) from the south

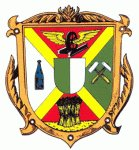
- Flag Coat of arms

- Location in the Czech Republic
- Coordinates: 50°12′36″N 12°44′14″E
- Country: Czech Republic
- Region: Karlovy Vary
- District: Sokolov
- First mentioned: 1397

Government
  - Mayor: Robert Zelenka

Area
  - Total: 16.98 km^{2} (6.56 sq mi)
- Elevation: 427 m (1,401 ft)

Population (2026-01-01)
  - Total: 2,527
  - Density: 148.8/km^{2} (385.4/sq mi)
- Time zone: UTC+1 (CET)
  - Summer (DST): UTC+2 (CEST)
- Postal code: 357 34
- Website: www.mestonovesedlo.cz

Nové Sedlo (Czech pronunciation: [ˈnovɛː ˈsɛdlo]; German: Neusattl) is a town in Sokolov District in the Karlovy Vary Region of the Czech Republic. It has about 2,500 inhabitants. It is known as an industrial town.

== Administrative division ==
Nové Sedlo consists of three municipal parts (in brackets population according to the 2021 census):

- Nové Sedlo (1,640)
- Chranišov (235)
- Loučky (647)

== Etymology ==
The name Nové Sedlo literally means 'new saddle' in modern Czech. However, the word sedlo also meant 'village' in old West Slavic languages (similar to the still-current selo of East and South Slavic languages). The prefix nové was added to distinguish from the nearby village of Staré Sedlo ('old Sedlo').

== Geography ==
Nové Sedlo is located about 6 kilometres (4 mi) northeast of Sokolov and 9 km (6 mi) west of Karlovy Vary. It lies mostly in the Sokolov Basin, only a small part of the municipal territory in the east extends into the Slavkov Forest. The highest point is at 500 m (1,640 ft) above sea level.

The Ohře River flows along the southern municipal border. There are several small artificial bodies of water in the territory. The largest of them is the multi-purpose Anna reservoir with an area of 4 ha (10 acres), located inside the built-up area.

== History ==
The first written mention of Nové Sedlo is from 1397. The village was badly damaged during the Hussite Wars. In the 16th century, Nové Sedlo was owned by Sebastian Thüssel of Taltitz, who then sold in to the town of Loket. In 1899, Nové Sedlo was promoted to a market town. Emperor Franz Joseph I promoted it to a town in 1908.

== Demographics ==
Historical population

| Year | Pop. | ±% |
|---|---|---|
| 1869 | 1,212 | — |
| 1880 | 2,400 | +98.0% |
| 1890 | 5,363 | +123.5% |
| 1900 | 8,235 | +53.6% |
| 1910 | 8,966 | +8.9% |

| Year | Pop. | ±% |
|---|---|---|
| 1921 | 7,697 | −14.2% |
| 1930 | 8,004 | +4.0% |
| 1950 | 4,561 | −43.0% |
| 1961 | 4,299 | −5.7% |
| 1970 | 3,021 | −29.7% |

| Year | Pop. | ±% |
|---|---|---|
| 1980 | 2,834 | −6.2% |
| 1991 | 2,508 | −11.5% |
| 2001 | 2,639 | +5.2% |
| 2011 | 2,622 | −0.6% |
| 2021 | 2,522 | −3.8% |

Source: Censuses

== Economy ==
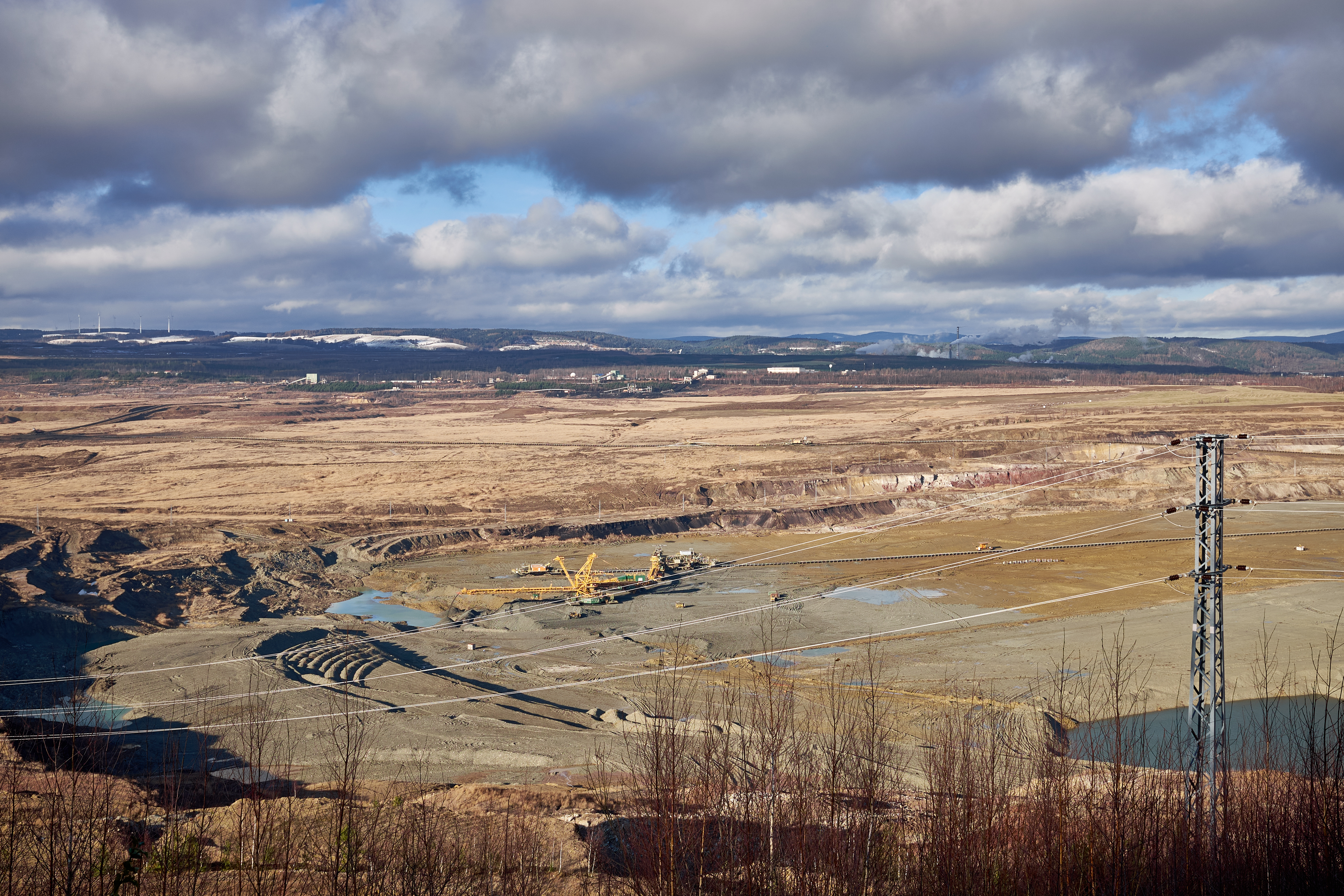
Družba Mine

The region is historically associated with lignite mining. A large part of the municipal territory is also formed by the Družba Mine. In addition to coal mining, Nové Sedlo is known for the production of packaging glass and porcelain.

== Transport ==
The D6 motorway from Karlovy Vary to Cheb runs through the town.

Nové Sedlo is located on the major railway line Plzeň–Karlovy Vary and on the local line Loket–Chodov.

== Sights ==
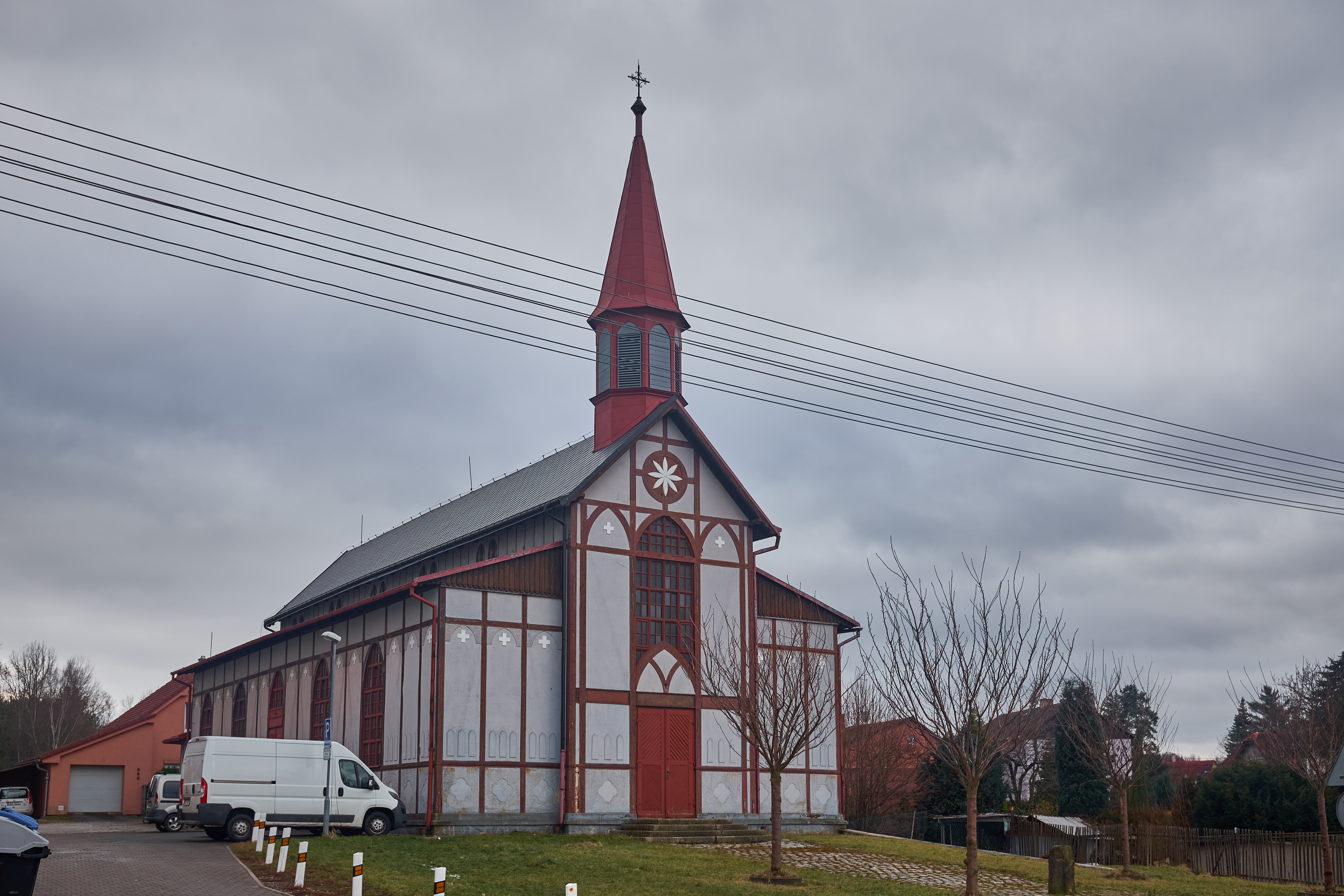
Church of the Ascension of Christ

The main landmark of Nové Sedlo is the Church of the Ascension of Christ. It was built in the neo-Gothic style in 1904. It is a unique half-timbered building, originally built only as a temporary church with a lifespan of 10 years.

A cultural and technical monument is a chimney from the 1890s that is a remnant of the Friedrich Siemens glass factory.

== Twin towns – sister cities ==
Nové Sedlo is twinned with:

- Schwarzenberg, Germany
