= Cinema City =

Cinema City may refer to:

- Cinema City, a Canadian cinema chain operated by Cineplex Entertainment
- Cinema City, Cairo, a complex incorporating Studio Nahas
- Cinema City (film festival), a film festival in Novi Sad, Serbia, a.k.a. Film Festival of Serbia
- Cinema City & Films Co., a defunct Hong Kong company that created films during 1980 to 1991
- Cinema City International, a chain of cinemas in Central Europe operated by Cineworld
  - Cinema City Czech Republic
  - Cinema City Hungary
  - Cinema City Poland
- Norwich Cinema City
