= Ward Anderson =

Irish cinema chain

Chain logos

Ward Anderson was a cinema chain across the island of Ireland until 2013. It was the largest chain in Ireland and operated cinemas throughout the Republic of Ireland and Northern Ireland. It was not a single company but was a group of companies such as Provincial Cinemas Ltd., the Dublin Cinema Group, the Green Group, and so on, owned by its founders, half brothers Leo Ward (born 1919) and Kevin Anderson (born 1915), and its brands were managed by members of their families.

Until it was divided in 2013, the group ran two main chains - Omniplex Cinemas and Irish Multiplex Cinemas - which operated in many provincial towns in Ireland. The typical cinema owned by the group had between five and ten screens. They also used the Cineplex brand name. The group's companies owned 23 cinemas in the Republic of Ireland and 12 cinemas in Northern Ireland.

The group's flagship was the Savoy Cinema in O'Connell Street, Dublin. It also owned the Screen Cinema in D'Olier Street, which tended to show more alternative films.

== Split ==
The two families fell out after the Andersons signed a deal to build a cinema on the Stephen's Green shopping centre, without notifying, or involving the Ward's in the new cinema. The new cinema would have been in direct competition with their jointly owned cinemas in Dublin city centre, The Savoy, and The Screen. This resulted in a long-running legal struggle that led to a major case in Four Courts in which the Ward and Anderson families eventually agreed to split their cinema empire in January 2013.

The agreement to divide the assets allocated 23 cinemas to the Anderson family including the 13-screen Cork Omniplex and 22 other cinemas in their Omniplex Cinemas Group. The Ward family were allocated 12 cinemas in their Irish Multiplex Cinemas group, including the Savoy and Screen cinemas in Dublin.

Paul Ward and Paul Anderson, who are the sons of the co-founders of the Ward Anderson Group, Leo Ward and Kevin Anderson, operate each of the cinema chains separately.

== Former Cinema locations ==
=== Republic of Ireland ===
- Athlone (IMC) 6 Screen
- Ballina (Cineplex) 6 Screen
- Carlow (Omniplex Digital) 8 Screen
- Clonmel (Omniplex) 5 Screen
- Cork (Omniplex) 13 Screen
- Drogheda (Omniplex) 4 Screen
- Dublin (Savoy Cinema) 6 Screen
- Dublin (Screen Cinema) 3 Screen
- Dublin (Swan Omniplex) 4 Screen
- Dún Laoghaire (IMC) 13 Screen
- Dundalk (IMC) 7 Screen
- Galway (IMC) 10 Screen
- Kilkenny (Omniplex) 4 Screen
- Killarney (IMC) 5 Screen
- Limerick (Omniplex) 12 Screen
- Longford (Omniplex) 4 Screen
- Mullingar (IMC) 6 Screen
- Oranmore (IMC) 6 Screen
- Santry (IMC) 11 Screen
- Tallaght (IMC) 14 Screen
- Thurles (IMC) 5 Screen
- Tralee (Omniplex) 8 Screen
- Tullamore (IMC) 7 Screen
- Wexford (Omniplex Digital) 8 Screen

=== Northern Ireland ===
- Antrim (Omniplex Digital & Omnimaxx) 10 Screen
- Armagh (Omniplex Digital) 4 Screen
- Ballymena (IMC) 7 Screen
- Bangor (Omniplex) 7 Screen
- Belfast, Kennedy Centre (Omniplex Digital) 8 Screen
- Carrickfergus (Omniplex) 6 Screen
- Derry (Omniplex) 7 Screen
- Dundonald (Omniplex Digital) 8 Screen
- Enniskillen (Omniplex) 7 Screen
- Larne (Omniplex Digital) 8 Screen
- Lisburn (Omniplex) 14 Screen
- Newry (Omniplex) 9 Screen
