= Omniplex Cinemas =

Cinema group in Ireland and the UK

Omniplex Holdings Unlimited Company
- Industry: Cinemas
- Founded: 1991; 34 years ago
- Founder: Kevin Anderson
- Headquarters: Dublin, Ireland
- Number of locations: 44
- Area served: Ireland; United Kingdom
- Key people: Mark Anderson; Paul Anderson Jr.
- Owner: Anderson family
- Website: www.omniplex.ie www.omniplexcinemas.co.uk

Omniplex Holdings Unlimited Company (trading as Omniplex Cinemas) is an Irish cinema chain which started in the Republic of Ireland in 1991. Following this they expanded to Derry, Northern Ireland in 1993. In late 2023, it entered the markets in England and Scotland by acquiring the former Empire Cinemas after their bankruptcy.

It is operated by Paul Anderson. It operates cinemas throughout Ireland and the United Kingdom. In 2013, Omniplex began a €14.5m investment and renovation in a number of its cinemas including the rolling out across Ireland of its large screen format OmniplexMAXX.

Omniplex owns 44 cinemas, with 22 cinemas in the Republic of Ireland and 22 cinemas in the United Kingdom. Omniplex also owns a small shopping centre portfolio which consists of the Swan Centre in Rathmines and Scotch Hall Shopping Centre in Drogheda.

== History ==
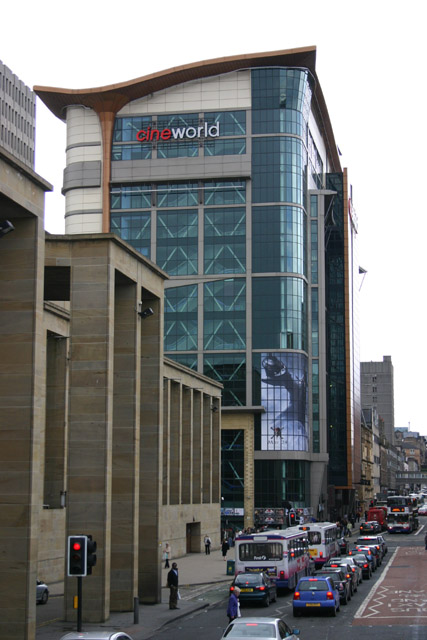
Omniplex owns the world's tallest cinema in Glasgow, Scotland.

The Anderson family have a long history in the film and cinema business dating back to 1948 when Kevin Anderson (Paul Anderson's father now retired) first started a film distribution business. The first films acquired were The Hills of Donegal and The Rose of Tralee, which were distributed to cinemas across Ireland.

The first cinema was purchased in Lucan in 1955. The Andersons continued to acquire, redevelop and sell cinemas across Ireland over the subsequent decades. Their biggest acquisition came when they bought the Rank Cinemas portfolio in 1988, which included Dublin's flagship Savoy cinema and The Screen cinema, which the Andersons jointly owned as part of the Dublin Cinema Group until 2013.

The first cinema to be branded an Omniplex was in Santry (now IMC). Since then, Omniplex has expanded in both the Republic of Ireland and Northern Ireland. This includes the 13 screen Cork Omniplex which opened in 2005 and the Rathmines Omniplex which completed in 2014 following a 15-year campaign to open cinemas in The Swan SC, which the Andersons acquired in 1999.

The company announced the acquisition of the Quayside cinema in Balbriggan, which was bought from NAMA and refurbished at a cost of €1.5m.

As well as screening films, Omniplex cinemas also show live events that are broadcast from around the world. This includes weekly live show from New York's Met Opera, The Bolshoi Ballet and music concerts.

Omniplex are reported to sell 5.5m cinema tickets per year.

In 2014, Omniplex launched a bid to buy the lease of the Odyssey Complex in Belfast, the Odyssey Trust declined the deal.

In May 2015 it was announced that Omniplex had bought the Gaiety Cinema Group (GCG) in an €8m deal. GCG owned two cinemas in Sligo and Arklow.

In February 2023, Omniplex brought the Scotch Hall Shopping Centre in Drogheda.

In 2023, Omniplex opened a concept cinema in CastleCourt, Belfast under the name The Avenue. Omniplex later brought the concept to its new Sunderland cinema in September 2025 as luxury cinema screens.

On 4 December 2023, Omniplex announced it had expanded into Great Britain, with the acquisition of the Empire Cinemas chain, which had previously entered administration in July. Omniplex would later acquire more cinemas in Sunderland and Wigan.

In May 2025, Omniplex acquired Cineworld Glasgow from Cineworld, meaning they now own the tallest cinema in the world and would rebrand it under their name after Cineworld leaves the building in September 2025. Omniplex announced on 27 October 2025 that they would be reopening the cinema in summer 2026 as the building will receive extensive refurbishments. It opened on 10 July 2026.

== OmniplexMAXX ==
The OmniplexMAXX is the next generation of giant format cinemas screens being rolled out across Omniplex's cinemas. This includes the OmniplexMAXX in Antrim which, at 23 metres (75 ft) wide, is Ireland's widest cinema screen. Other OmniplexMAXX screens have opened in Mahon, Cork, in 2013 Limerick, Banbridge, Waterford and Rathmines, which opened in 2014 with the Irish premier of The Inbetweeners 2. New OmniplexMAXX screens are planned in Dundonald and Dundalk. The auditoriums include custom-designed leather reclining armchairs as standard, HD digital projection, MasterImage 3D and Dolby Atmos surround sound.

== Omniparks ==
In 2015 Omniplex launched OmniPark, the new leisure park brand covering four of the parks that company owns, on which it has cinemas. Omniparks are located in Dundonald, Craigavon, Bangor and Omagh.

== Ward Anderson Court Case ==
The Andersons were formerly partners of the Wards, owners of Irish Multiplex Cinemas in the Ward Anderson cinemas empire. However, two families fell out after the Andersons signed a deal to build a cinema on the Stephen's Green shopping centre, without notifying, or involving the Wards in the new cinema. The new cinema would have been in direct competition with their jointly owned cinemas in Dublin city centre, The Savoy, and The Screen. This resulted in a long-running legal struggle that led to a major case in Four Courts in which the Ward and Anderson families eventually agreed to split their cinema empire in January 2013.

The agreement to divide the assets allocated 23 cinemas to the Anderson family including the 13-screen Cork Omniplex and 22 other cinemas in their Omniplex Cinemas Group. The Ward family were allocated 12 cinemas in their Irish Multiplex Cinemas group, including the Savoy and Screen cinemas in Dublin.

Paul Anderson is the son of Kevin Anderson who is one of the co-founders of Ward Anderson.
