= Greidinger =

Greidinger is a surname. Notable people with the surname include:

- Dahlia Greidinger (1926–1979), Israeli scientist
- Mooky Greidinger (born 1952), Israeli businessman, CEO of Cineworld
