= Vincent Browne (sculptor) =

Irish sculptor (1947–2026)

- Born: 1947; Dublin, Ireland
- Died: 5 August 2026 (aged 78–79)
- Occupation: Sculptor
- Known for: Public sculpture

Vincent Browne (1947 – 5 August 2026) was an Irish sculptor, known for his public art.

== Life ==
Browne was born in Dublin, Ireland in 1947. He studied at the National College of Art and Design and at the Jan Van Eyck Academy in the Netherlands. Browne died at his home on 5 August 2026, at the age of 78.

== Career ==
He created a well-loved Dublin landmark, Mr. Screen, the squat bronze usher who stood outside the Screen Cinema at the junction of Hawkins Street and Townsend Street in Dublin for many years. Mr. Screen was made from two immersion water heaters and was relocated to the Savoy Cinema after the closure of the Screen. His public commissions also include Anti-War Memorial (Limerick, 1987) and the bronze Palm Tree seat in Temple Bar, Dublin. He was also commissioned to create mosaic panels for Ballycreagh National School in Firhouse, Blanchardstown Library, and Burren Fish Products in Lisdoonvarna.

In 1974, 1985, and 1986 he won the Oireachtas Gold Medal for sculpture, and the Waterford Glass Prize in 1992. He was awarded numerous grants from the Arts Council and the Department of Foreign Affairs. In 1987, Browne represented Ireland in Budapest at the 7th International Small Sculpture Show. In 1992, he was elected to Aosdána. He won the 1993 Concrete Society of Ireland Sculpture Award for his Maritime Piece in Wicklow town. He had solo exhibitions in 1990 in Castletymon Library and in 1991 in Blanchardstown Library. In 2002, he participated in the Sculpture in Context group show in the National Botanic Gardens, Glasnevin.

During the 1990s, he worked part time as a lecturer in metals at the Dublin Institute of Technology.

In 2005, Browne was commissioned to create a sculpture for the exterior of the Blanchardstown Civic Offices called The Tree of Life, which was constructed in bronze with hand-welded leaves representing a DNA double helix, symbolising growth and the environment of the county's civic centre.

== Notable works ==
- Anti-War Memorial, Limerick (1987)
- Mr. Screen, Dublin (1988)
- Palm Tree, Dublin
- The Tree of Life (2005)
- Hiroshima/ Nagasaki Memorial Sculpture (2007)

== Gallery ==
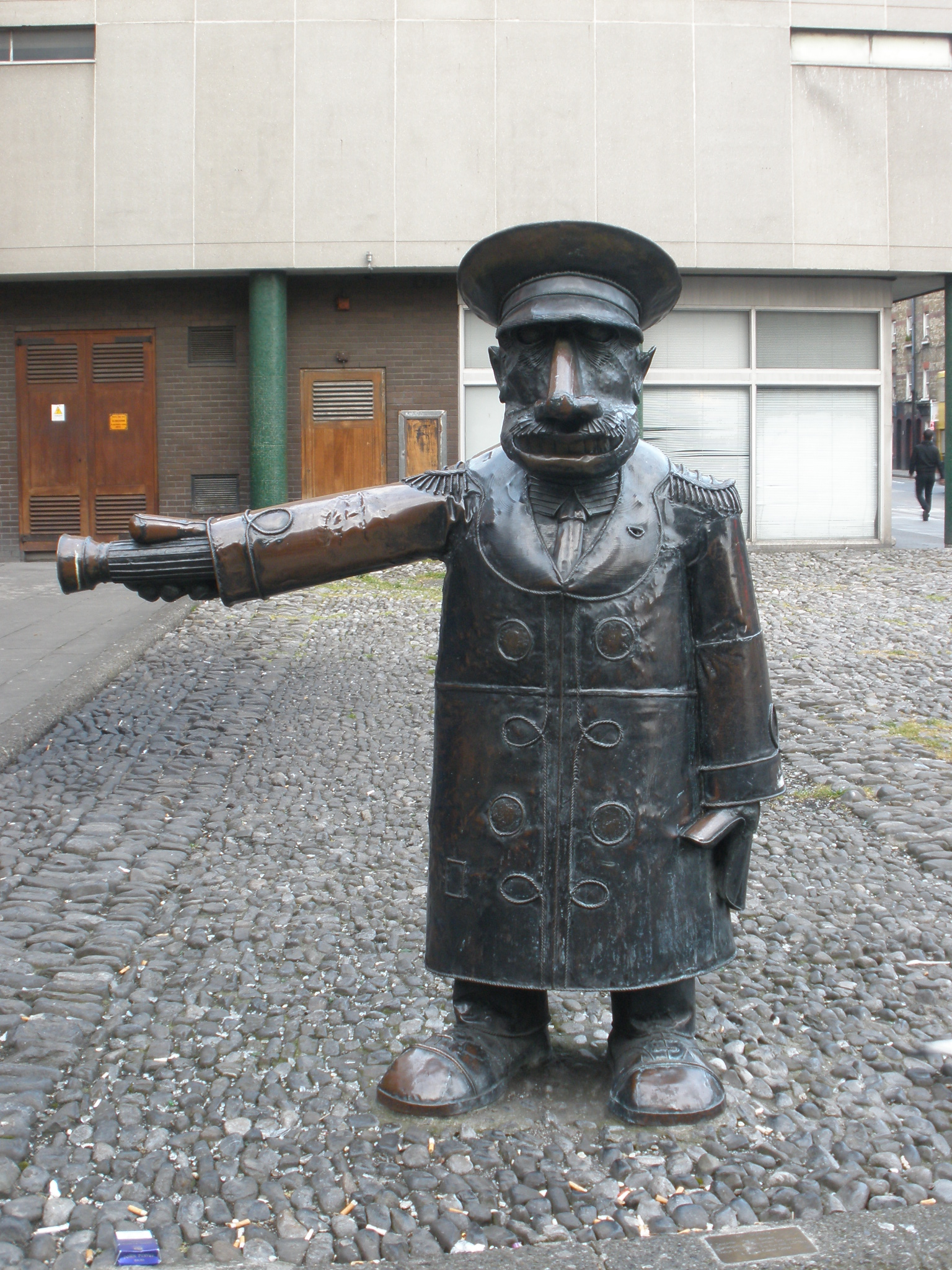
Mr. Screen statue outside the Screen Cinema

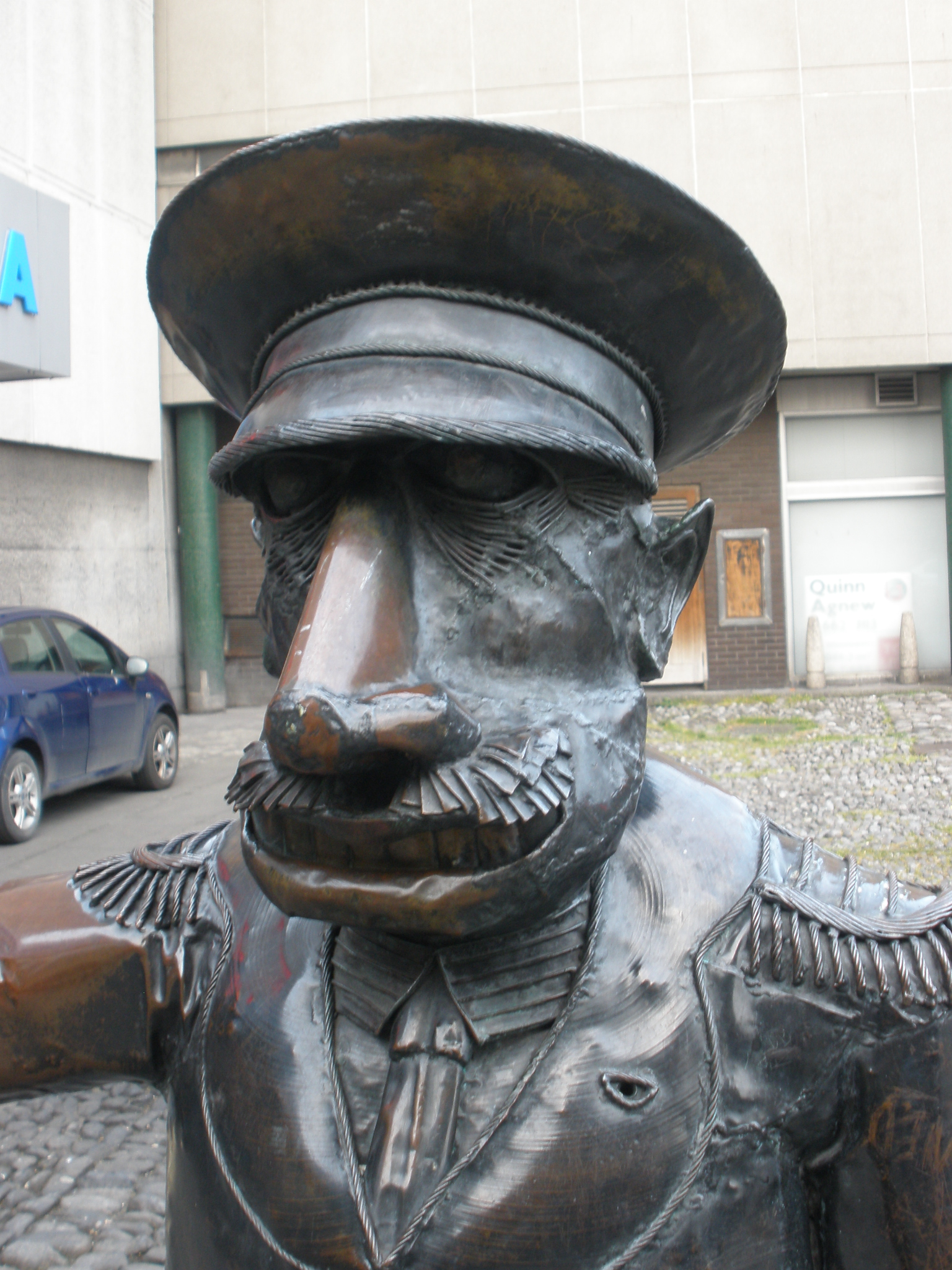
Cinema usher statue by Vincent Browne

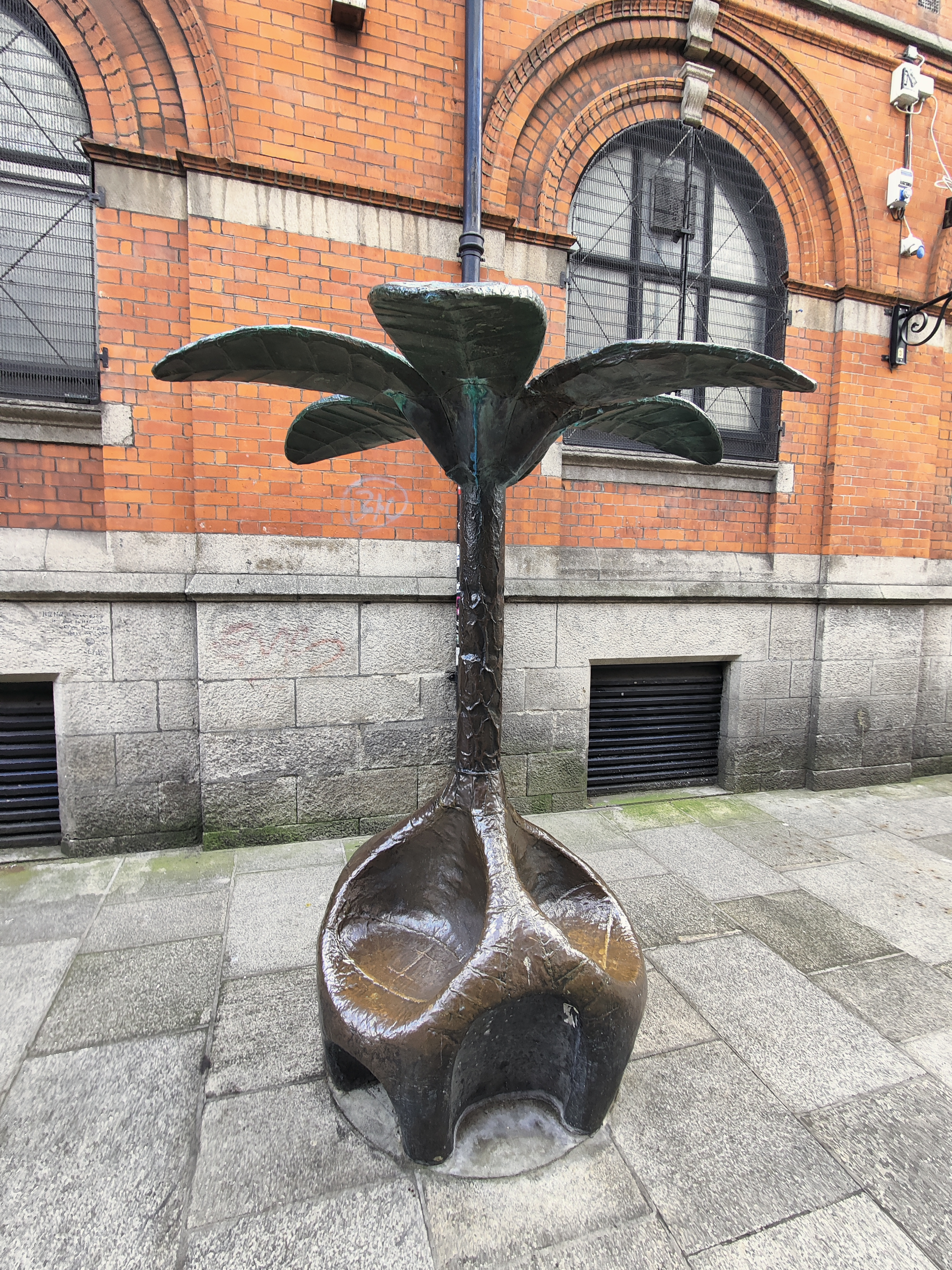
Temple Bar palm tree

Anti-War Memorial, Limerick detail

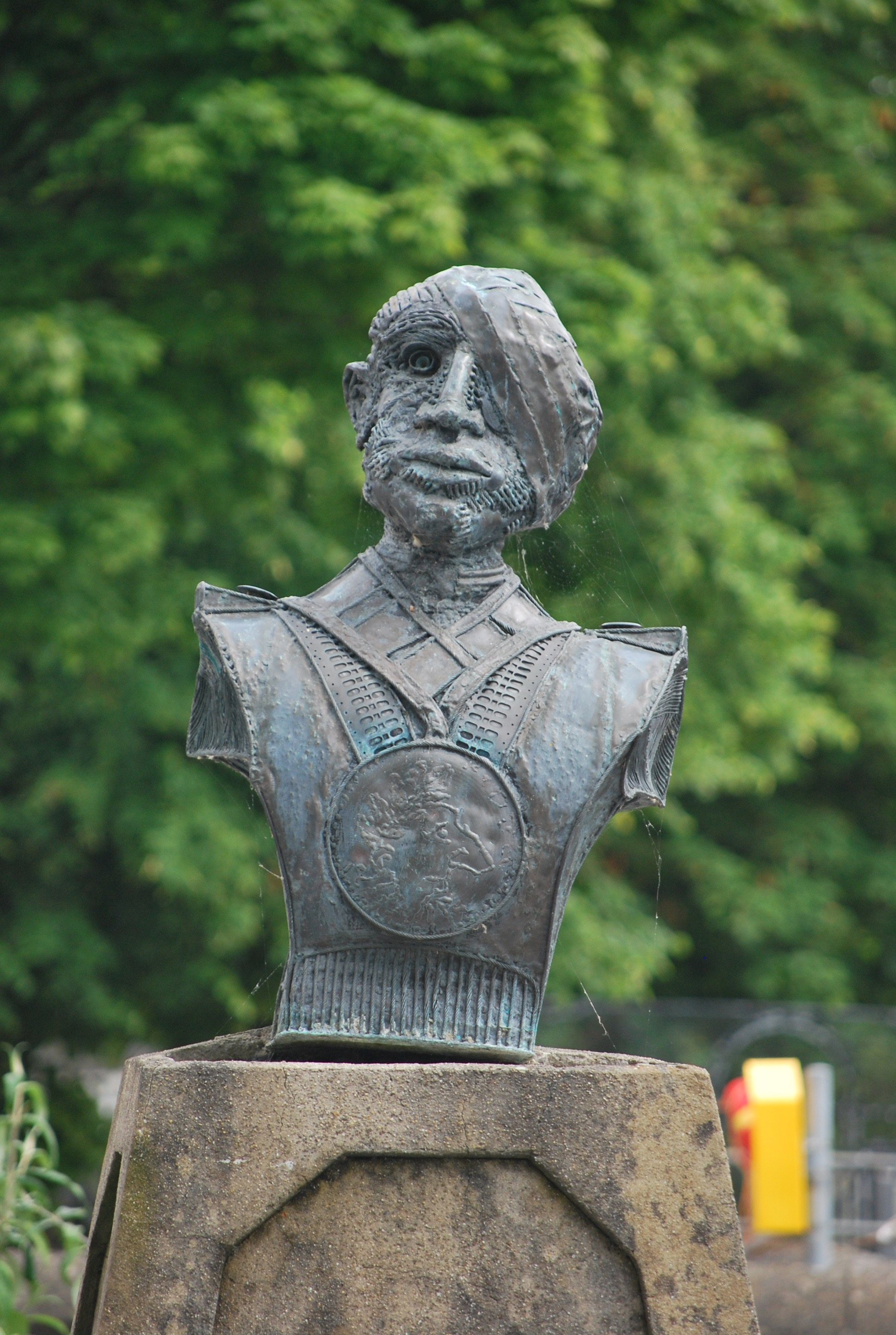
Anti-War Memorial, Limerick detail
