= Cinema City Hungary =

Brand of multiplex cinemas in Europe

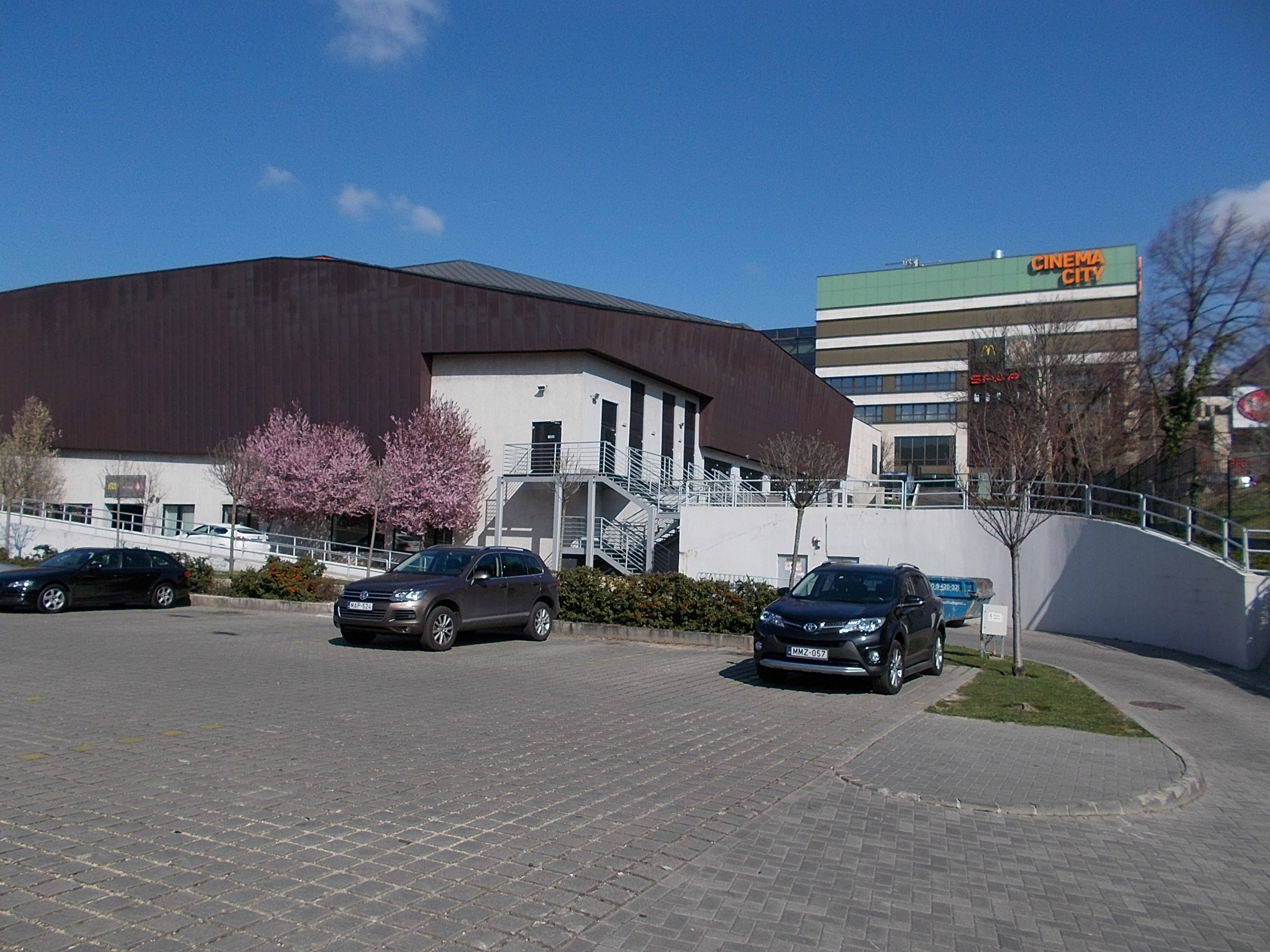
A Cinema City movie theater in Budapest

Cinema City is a brand of multiplex cinemas in eastern and central Europe, run by the Israeli company Cinema City International (CCI), a subsidiary of Cineworld Group. In Europe it has cinemas in Hungary, Poland, Slovakia, Romania, and the Czech Republic. CCI also runs a chain of Israeli multiplexes under the name of Rav-Hen.

Cinema City is the largest multiplex operator in central and eastern Europe and in Israel. On 18 December 1997 Cinema City began its operations in Europe. Hungary was the first country, in which a Cinema City subsidiary opened its doors.

== Current multiplex locations ==
- Csepel (Budapest) - 1373 seats, 7 screens, opened 1997, closed June 2008
- Győr - 1913 seats, 10 screens, opened 1998
- Debrecen - 1723 seats, 9 screens, opened 1998
- Sopron - 1381 seats, 7 screens, opened 1998
- Székesfehérvár - 1885 seats, 10 screens, opened 1999
- Pécs - 1988 seats, 10 screens, opened 1999
- Miskolc (Miskolc Plaza mall) - 1406 seats, 8 screens, opened 2000
- Szeged - 1969 seats, 9 screens, opened 2000
- VIP (Budapest) - 800 seats, 6 screens, opened December 2000, closed January 2006
- Szolnok - 749 seats, 4 screens, opened 2001
- Zalaegerszeg - 757 seats, 4 screens, opened March 2002
- Szombathely - 734 seats, 4 screens, opened June 2002
- Veszprém - 608 seats, 4 screens, opened May 2004
- Cinema City Aréna (Budapest, Aréna Plaza mall) - 3888 seats, 22 screens(1 IMAX, 17 multiplex and 5 VIP), opened January 2008
- Cinema City Allee (Budapest), Allee mall - 13 screens
- Eurovea (Bratislava) - 9 screens
- Aupark (Bratislava) - also has a 4DX screening hall
- Polus City Center (Bratislava)

In 2009 a subsidiary of Cinema City International signed a lease for space in the Skála shopping mall in Budapest for a multiplex with 13 screens and almost 2,000 seats. During that time period this multiplex was Cinema Citys' second movie theatre in Budapest and its 14th project in Hungary.

In 2011 Cinema City acquired Palace Cinemas CE which operated 11 multiplex cinemas in Hungary. Cinema City took over Palace Cinemas' multiplexes in Czech Republic and Slovakia also. In Hungary 4 cinemas were not part of deal. Ex-Palace sites in Hungary:

- Westend (Budapest) - 14 screens (1 4DX)
- Mammut (Budapest) - 13 screens
- Mom Park (Budapest) - 6 screens
- Campona (Budapest) - 11 screens
- Duna Plaza (Budapest) - 7 screens
- Kaposvár - 4 screens
- Nyíregyháza - 6 screens

== Corporate governance ==
The company's management board consist of three members:

- Mooky Greidinger (CEO)
- Amos Weltsch (COO)
- Israel Greidinger (CFO)

== See also ==
- Cinema City Poland
- Cinema City Czech Republic
- Rav-Hen
