= Irish Multiplex Cinemas =

Cinema chain in Ireland

- Company type: Private limited company
- Industry: Cinema
- Founded: 17 November 1970; 54 years ago in Carlow, Ireland
- Owner: Ward family
- Website: imc.ie

Irish Multiplex Cinemas (or the IMC Cinema Group) is a cinema chain in Ireland. It operates cinemas throughout the Republic of Ireland and Northern Ireland. It was part of the Ward Anderson company until 2013, when it was split between IMC and Omniplex Cinema Group.

The typical cinema owned by IMC has between five and ten screens. The company owns 18 Cinemas altogether, with 15 in the Republic of Ireland and 3 in Northern Ireland, most recently buying MovieLAND in Newtownards, County Down after the passing of its owner, the cinema still used the MovieLAND branding until it was rebranded to IMC in 2023.

The company's flagship is the Savoy Cinema in O'Connell Street, Dublin, which is the oldest operational cinema in Dublin, and the preferred cinema in Ireland for film premières. It also owned the Screen Cinema in D'Olier Street, which showed more alternative films but closed down in 2015.

Each cinema has different offers with some being on specific days, looking at their website gives all details on offers. Offers include cinema ticket price reductions and concession deals.

== Cinema locations ==
Location	Number of screens	Opening date
Athlone	6	April 1998
Ballina	6	N/A
Ballymena	7	31 July 1998
Banbridge	5	May 2004
Carlow	8	17 November 1970
Clonmel	5	2016
Savoy Cinema	7	29 November 1929 2005 (renovated)
Screen Cinema	3	N/A
Dún Laoghaire	14	N/A
Dundalk	7	1999
Enniskillen	7	14 April 2000
Galway	7 (initially when opened) 10	1993
Kilkenny	12	17 August 1998
Mullingar	6	December 2002
Newtownards, County Down	6	26 December 2018
Oranmore	6	1 April 2005
Santry	11	N/A
Tallaght	12	26 April 2012
Thurles	5	January 2003
Tullamore	6	1996
