= Fashion Outlet Kraków =

Former shopping centre in Kraków, Poland

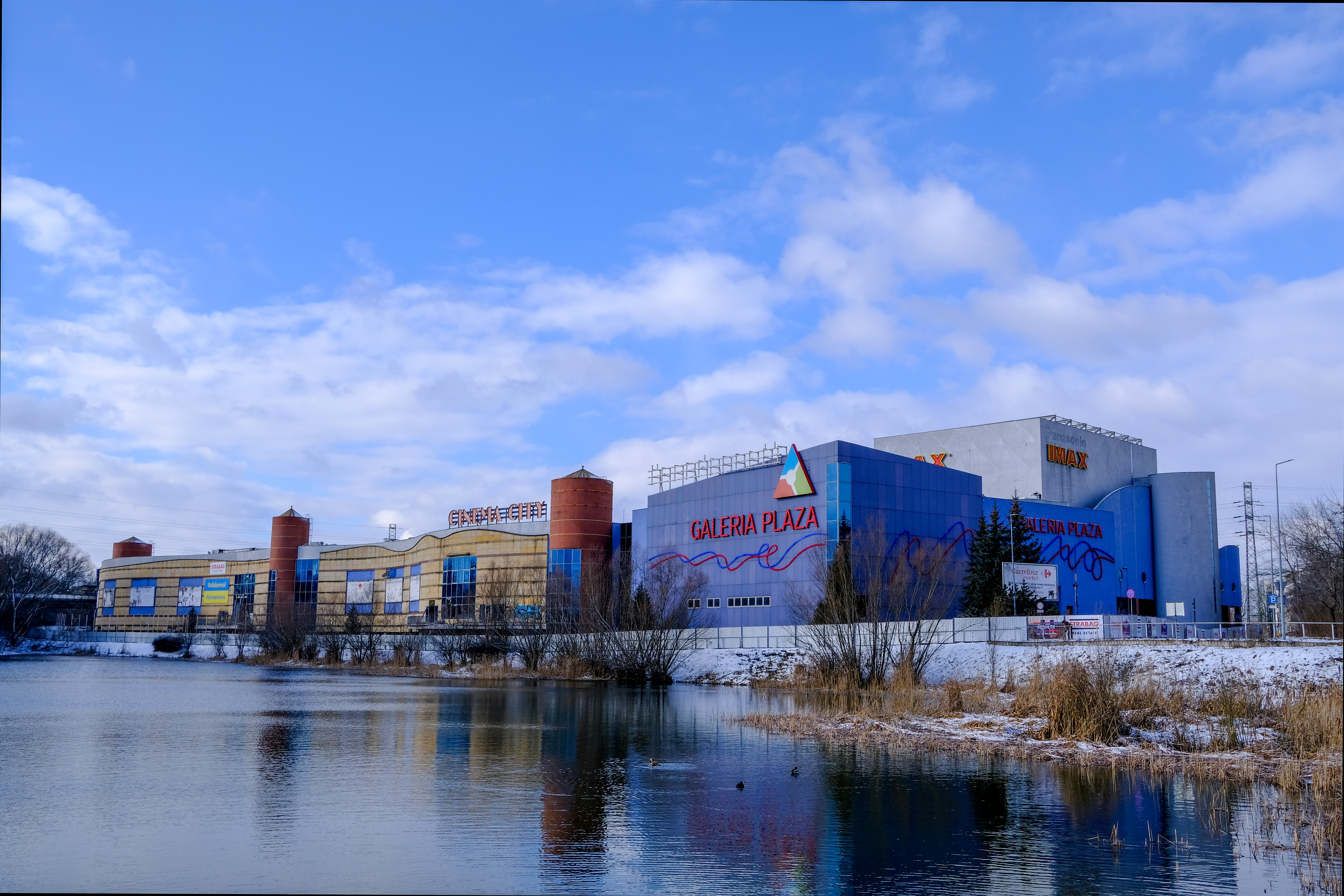
- View of the shopping centre during demolition in 2023
- Location: Kraków, Poland
- Coordinates: 50°03′52.1″N 19°59′02.1″E
- Address: aleja Pokoju 44
- Opened: 2002
- Closed: September 2021
- Demolished: April 2023
- Developer: Skanska
- Num. of stores: 120
- Num. of anchor tenants: Cinema City, Carrefour
- Floor area: 60,000 m^{2} (650,000 sq ft)
- Floors: 3
- Parking: 1,500 spaces

Fashion Outlet Kraków, formerly Kraków Plaza or Galeria Plaza, was a shopping centre in Kraków, Poland, located at Aleja Pokoju 44 in the district of Grzegórzki. The building opened in 2002 and closed after 19 years in 2021. From 2019 to 2021 it operated under the name Fashion Outlet Kraków. Demolition of the building began at the end of 2022 and was completed in April 2023.

== History ==
The shopping centre was built by Skanska in the years 2001–2002. The centre had 60,000 m² of usable area, 120 retail and service units, and 1,500 parking spaces next to the building. Tenants of the centre mostly consisted of clothing stores, a Cinema City cinema equipped with IMAX, McDonald's, and a Carrefour hypermarket.

In 2018, it was announced that the centre would be rebuilt as an outlet store.

In September 2021, the last tenants left the building and it was closed. The IMAX projector in the centre's Cinema City, which was the only one in Kraków, was moved to another location in 2022.

At the beginning of 2022, the building was purchased by a new owner, who planned its demolition and the construction of a complex of new buildings.

In March 2022, before demolition commenced, the building was temporarily converted into a help centre and shelter for Ukrainian refugees. Demolition was completed in 2023.

== Gallery ==
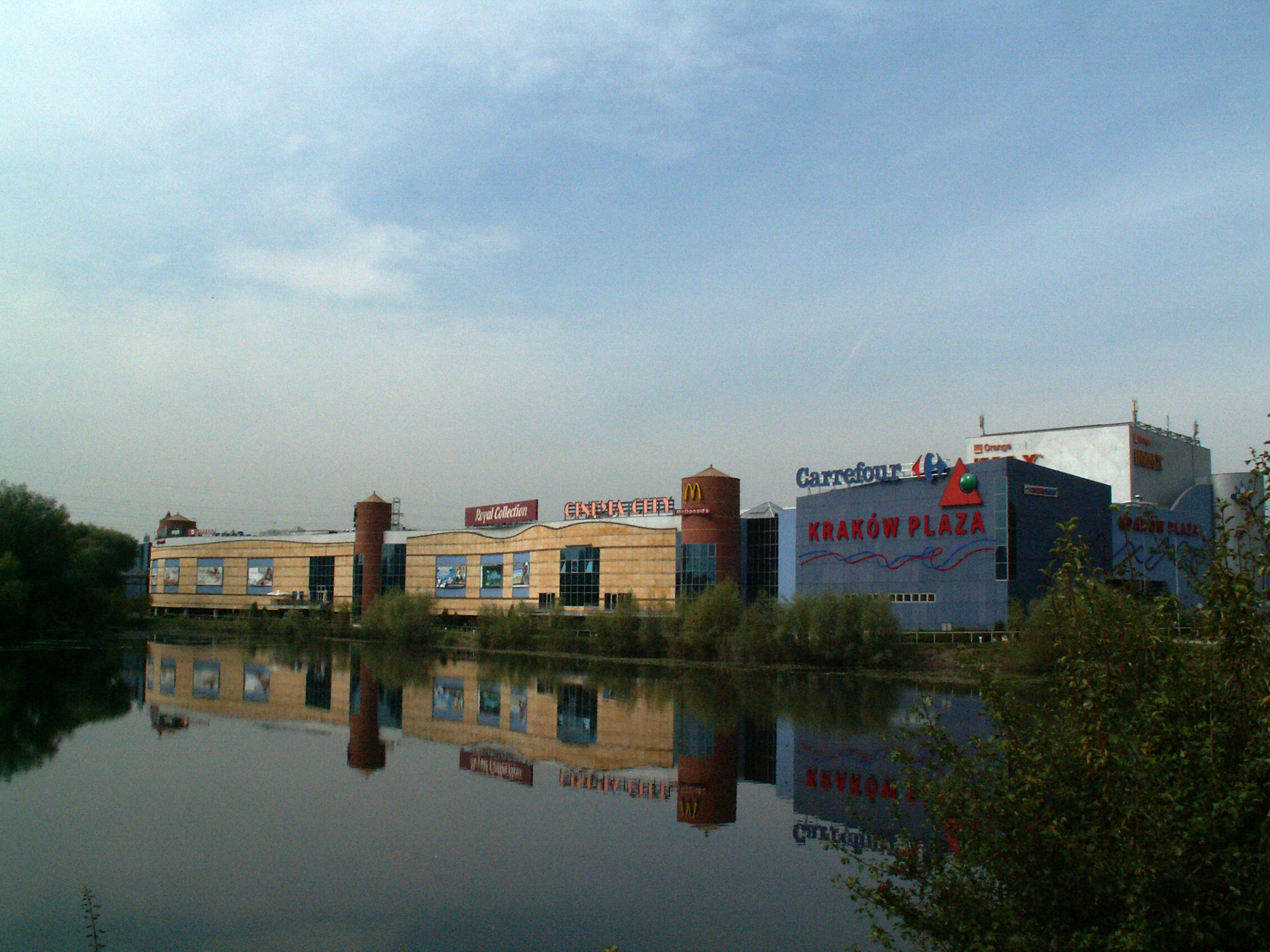
Kraków Plaza in Dąbie, Kraków

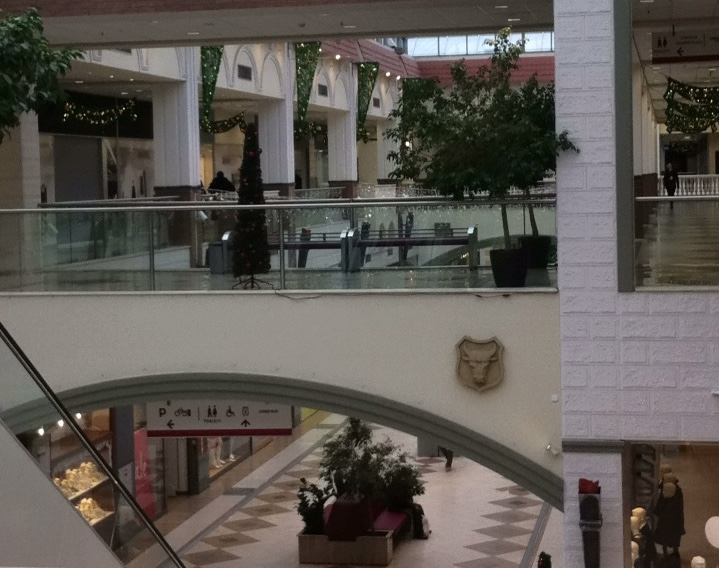
Kraków Plaza in the mid-2000s.

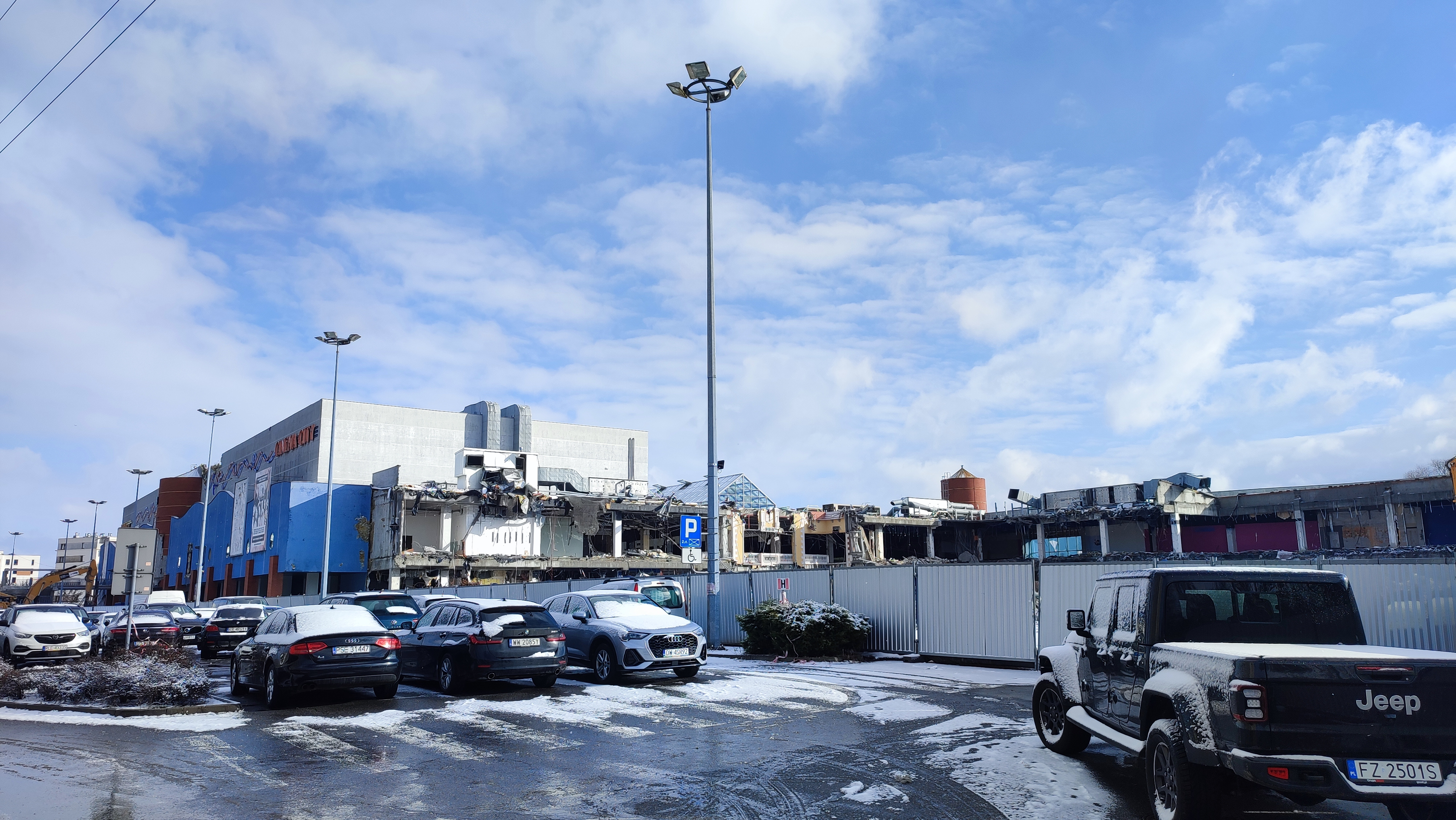
Demolition of the shopping centre
