= Dahlia Greidinger =

Israeli scientist

- דליה גרידינגר
- Born: Dahlia Katzenelbogen-Katz; July 27, 1926; Tel Aviv, Israel
- Died: July 16, 1979 (aged 52)
- Occupation: Chemist
- Children: 4, including Mooky Greidinger

Dahlia Greidinger (Hebrew: דליה גרידינגר; nee Katzenelbogen-Katz, July 27, 1926 – July 16, 1979) was an Israeli scientist who helped develop the country's chemical industry.

== Early life, family and education ==
Dahlia Greidinger was born in Neve Tzedek, Tel Aviv. She was a fifth generation Sabra. Her parents were Miriam Rokach and Joseph Katzenelbogen-Katz.

She attended the Hebrew Reali School of Haifa. She earned an M.Sc. in chemistry from the University of Lausanne, Switzerland, where she graduated with distinction.

== Career ==
Returning to Israel after her education in Switzerland, she was the first editor of Israel Scientific Council Magazine. In 1951, Greidinger became a teaching and research assistant at the Technion — Israel Institute of Technology. After completing her doctorate in 1958, she began working at Deshanim Fertilizers & Chemicals Ltd. By 1969, she was appointed director of Research and Development and elected to the board of directors. The company grew to become Israel's largest supplier of fertilizers.

Greidinger wrote for scientific publications and was the holder of several patents, among them a patent on Controlled release particulate fertilizer composition, 'Stable liquid N-P-K fertilizer composition and method of use', a liquid fertilizer composition storable for 6–8 months, and Solid Ammonium Polyphosphate Compositions and Manufacture. She was a member of the European Committee for Expansion, the Association of Academic Women and the Anti-Cancer Association.

== Legacy ==
The Feinberg Graduate School of Weizmann Institute of Science awards a fellowship for cancer research financed by the Dahlia Greidinger Anti-Cancer Fund. In honor of her contributions in the field of chemistry and fertilization systems, the family established the Dahlia Greidinger Fertilizer Research Fund.

== Personal life ==
She married Kalman (Coleman) Greidinger, a cinema company businessman, in October 1950. They had four children, including sons Moshe ("Mooky") and Israel, who were leaders in their father and grandfather's successor company, Cineworld until 31 July 2023, when it was announced that Mooky and his brother will leave Cineworld, after the company entered Chapter 11 process in September 2022.

She died of cancer in 1979, after ten years with the disease.

== See also ==
- Agricultural research in Israel
