= Empire Cinemas =

Cinema chain in the United Kingdom

Empire Cinemas Limited
- Company type: Private
- Industry: Leisure, Entertainment & refreshments
- Founded: 2005; 21 years ago
- Defunct: 2023; 3 years ago
- Fate: Administration, folded into Omniplex Cinemas
- Successor: Omniplex Cinemas
- Number of locations: 5 (July 2023)
- Products: Tickets, popcorn, alcohol, drinks & confectionery
- Website: www.empirecinemas.co.uk

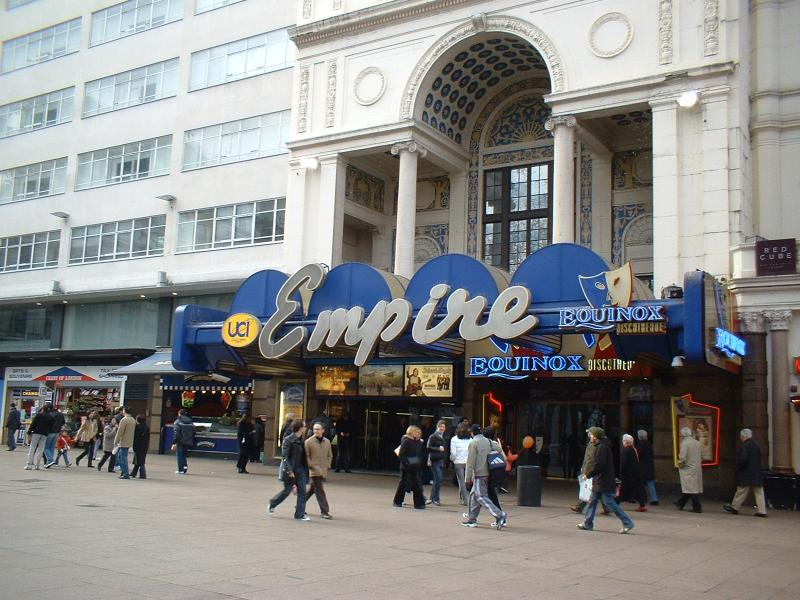
Empire Leicester Square, pictured in 2004 with the old signage

Empire Cinemas Limited was a multiplex cinema chain in the UK. Prior to the company entering administration in July 2023, there were 13 Empire Cinemas across the country, with 128 screens in total.

== Ownership and management ==
The ultimate beneficial owner of Empire Cinemas Ltd was Irish entrepreneur Thomas Anderson. Anderson also owns Inspiration Holdings Ltd, a company which now owns Altive Media, Pearl & Dean advertising company, Titan Parking and Clarkebond. The CEO of Empire Cinemas, Justin Ribbons, is also an Executive Director of Inspiration Holdings.

== History ==
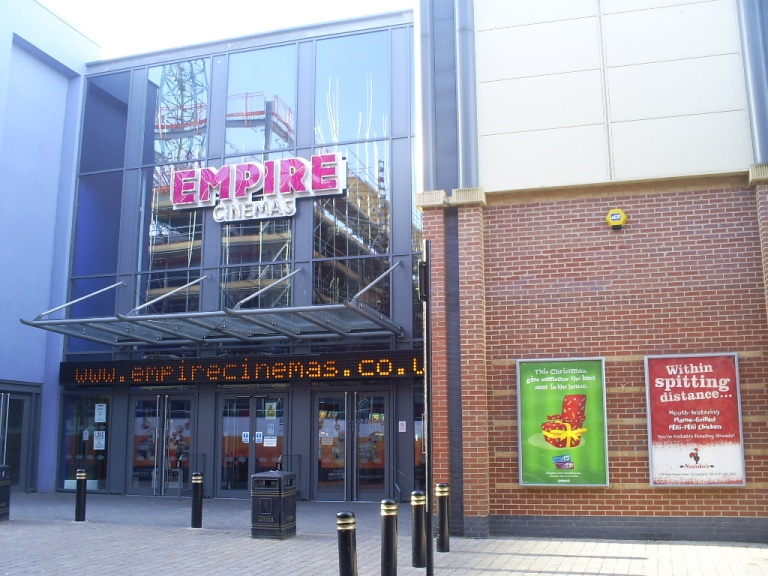
Empire Cinemas Sunderland, Sunniside Entertainment Complex

The Empire was originally a cinema in Leicester Square in London which opened in 1884 as the Empire Theatre and was a West End variety theatre, designed by Thomas Verity.

Empire Cinemas Limited was formed in 2005 when Empire acquired the cinemas divested from Odeon Cinemas and Cineworld after the Office of Fair Trading had required them to divest 11 of the Odeon chain and six of the Cineworld chain. In 2005, both Odeon and the UK operations of UCI were taken over by Terra Firma who planned to merge the businesses under the Odeon brand. At the same time, Cineworld took over the UK and Ireland operations of UGC and began merging them into their existing Cineworld brand. Empire Cinemas Ltd acquired both groups of available cinemas and began to rebrand them all as Empire Cinemas.

In July 2016, the company sold five cinemas, including the flagship in Leicester Square, to Cineworld for £94 million. The cinemas transferred to Cineworld cinemas on 12 August 2016. In June 2017 the Newcastle upon Tyne cinema was also sold to Cineworld cinemas.

In March 2020, Empire Cinemas and all other cinemas in the UK closed temporarily due to a national lockdown in response to the ongoing COVID-19 pandemic.

On 7 July 2023, Empire Cinemas entered administration with the immediate closure of six cinemas. The remaining five cinemas continued to trade under the Empire Cinemas name until 4 December 2023, when the rest of Empire Cinemas was acquired by Omniplex Cinemas, with it dissolving in the process.

== Magazine ==
Empire, in conjunction with cinema chain Showcase, published Escape, a bi-monthly customer magazine that was distributed freely at 50 cinemas. It contained film reviews, interviews and competitions.

== Former locations ==
Location	Screens	Notes
Bishop’s Stortford	6	Permanently closed in July 2023, due to entering administration.
Birmingham (Great Park)	13	Standard and Premium Seating in all screens, 1 former luxury screen and 1 IMAX screen seating 422 plus 4 wheelchairs. Acquired by Omniplex Cinemas in December 2023.
Catterick Garrison	7	Includes an IMPACT screen. Recliners, sofas and standard seating available in every screen. Permanently closed in July 2023. Reopened as a Savoy Cinema.
Clydebank	10	Acquired by Omniplex Cinemas in December 2023.
High Wycombe	8	Sofa and electric recliner seating added in Screens 3 & 4 in 2018. Acquired by Omniplex Cinemas in December 2023.
Ipswich	14	Includes 2 IMPACT screens and 2 D-BOX screens. Opened 31 March 2017. Acquired by Omniplex Cinemas in December 2023.
London – Haymarket	3	Acquired in exchange as part of the sale of five cinemas to Cineworld. Under Empire control from 7 April 2017. Permanently closed in May 2023.
Slough	10	1 luxury screen, 1 IMPACT screen. Permanently closed in December 2022.
Sunderland	12	Including VIP seating. Permanently closed in July 2023. Acquired by Omniplex Cinemas in February 2024
Sutton	12	Reopened on February 13, 2018 after an extensive refurbishment. Now features 2 IMPACT screens, and 2 D-Box screens. Acquired by Omniplex Cinemas in December 2023.
Sutton Coldfield	4	Closed during COVID-19 lockdown in November 2020. Purchase by PDJ Management Ltd announced in December 2023.
Swindon	12	1 IMAX screen installed in 2017. Permanently closed in July 2023. Reopened as Vue in December 2023.
Walthamstow	9	Opened 20 November 2014. Permanently closed in July 2023. Reopened as the independent Forest Cinema in August 2024.
Wigan	11	Opened in 1996 as Virgin Cinemas before being taken over by UGC, Cineworld and then Empire. Permanently closed in July 2023. Acquired by Omniplex Cinemas in March 2024

== Ealing site controversy ==
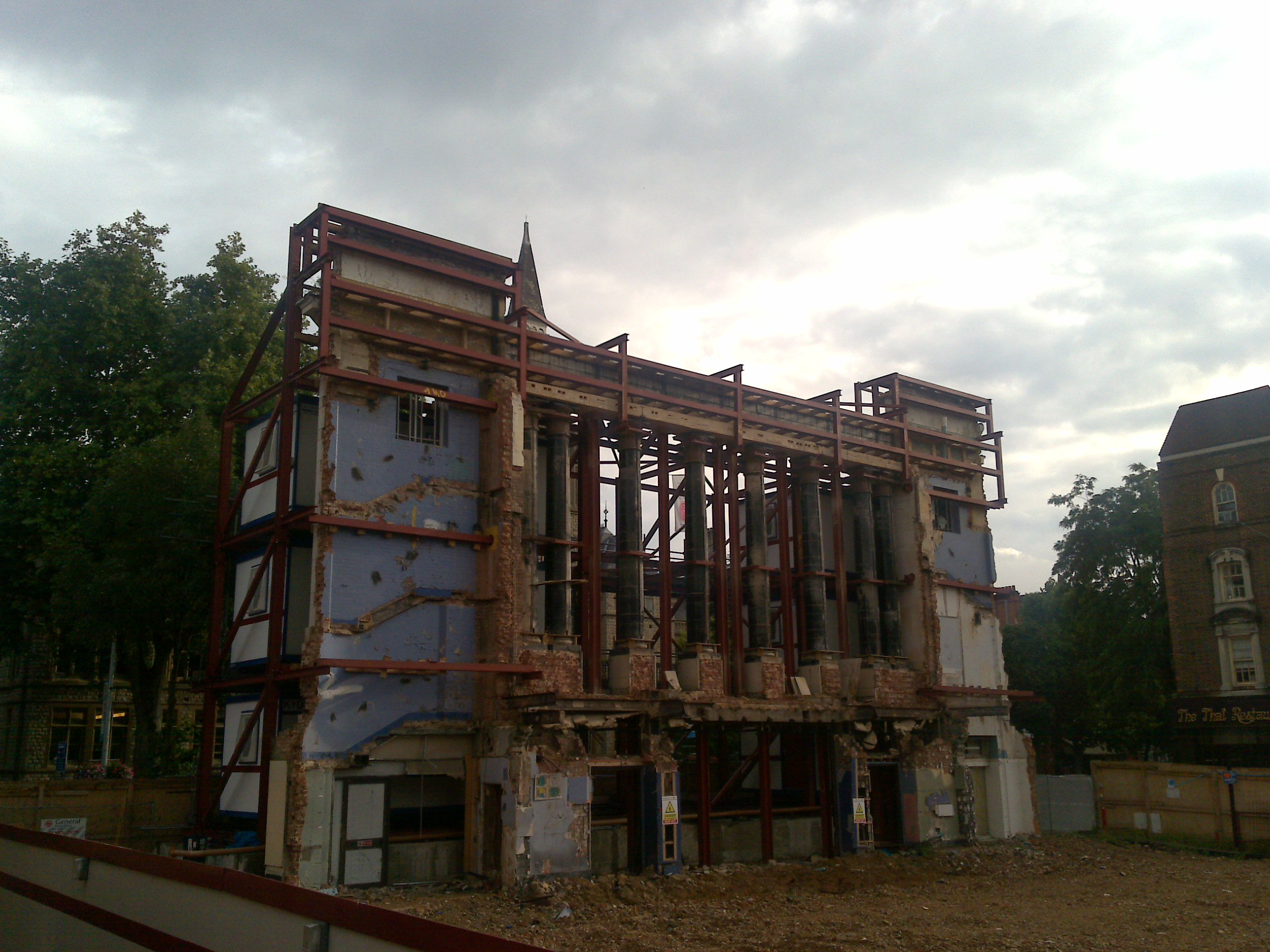
The remaining facade of the Empire Ealing location, following demolition of the main building

Empire Cinemas closed its Ealing cinema on 5 September 2008 and demolished the cinema in early 2009 for redevelopment, retaining the front facade. Empire had not yet started building work on the new cinema or (according to Ealing Council) presented a timescale for the building work as of 25 July 2011, so Ealing Council started to pursue a compulsory purchase of the Ealing cinema site. At a council meeting attended by CEO Justin Ribbons on 28 June 2011, Mr Ribbons responded to the council's complaints, saying that the delay was caused by a misunderstanding between Empire and council planning officers. At a later meeting between Justin Ribbons and Ealing Council on 14 September 2011, Mr Ribbons said that he was "optimistic that work could re-start before Christmas" however as of May 2012, construction work on the site had not yet started.

On 29 May 2012, Ealing Council's leader wrote to Empire to inform them that compulsory purchase proceedings would now start. On 2 June 2012, Empire Cinemas released a statement to the press, announcing that Clarkebond (a consultancy owned by Empire's parent company, Inspiration Holdings) had been appointed to manage the construction, which would now start in "August 2012"; and that the finished cinema would open in "early 2014". As of 3 October 2012, construction had still not started and Empire changed the start date listed on their website from "August" to "August/September". As of 18 October 2012, any reference to a start date has been removed from the web site. On 19 October 2012, construction and excavation vehicles were seen in operation on the cinema site, however as of July 2015 no further building work had commenced.

Ealing Council served a compulsory purchase order on the site in July 2014, as part of plans to create a new "cultural quarter" in the area. The council announced it had reached an agreement with Land Securities to develop the cinema and buildings nearby, and that Picturehouse Cinemas would operate the new cinema. An inquiry into the compulsory purchase order was launched in April 2015, and was approved in October 2015. Construction work began on the site in December 2016, with the Ealing Picturehouse eventually opening in October 2023.
