= Omniplex Glasgow =

Cinema in Glasgow, Scotland

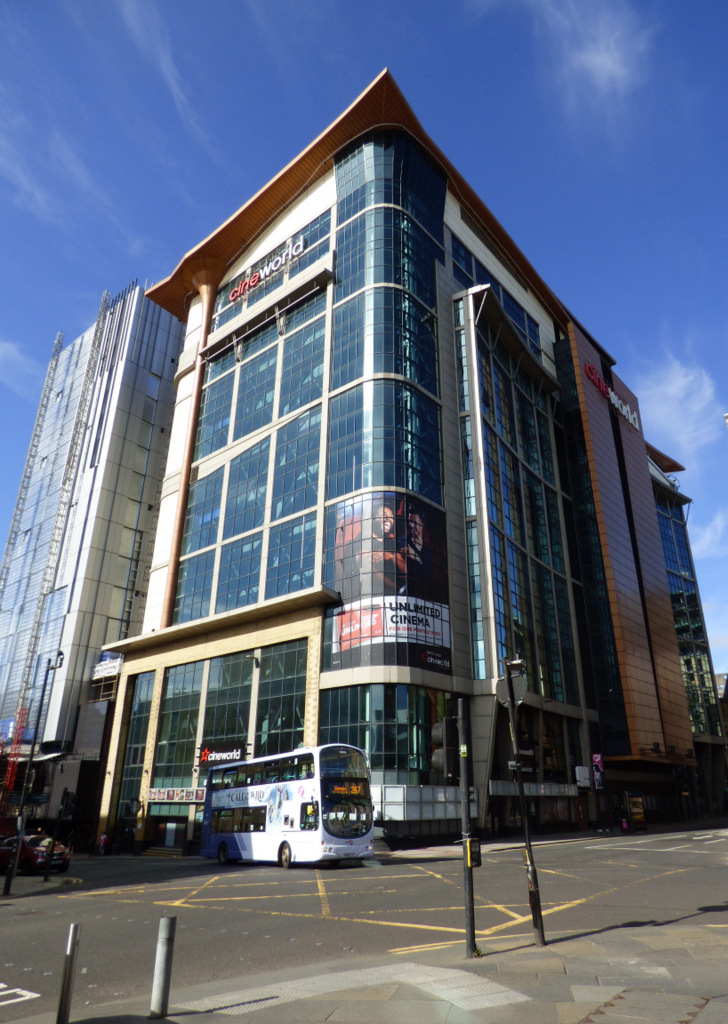
- Cineworld taken from West Nile Street, with St Andrew House to the left.
- Interactive map of the Omniplex Glasgow area
- Former names: UGC Glasgow Renfrew Street (2001–2005); Cineworld Glasgow Renfrew Street (2005–2025)

General information
- Type: Cinema
- Location: 7 Renfrew Street, Glasgow, Scotland
- Coordinates: 55.86489°N 4.25517°W
- Opened: 21 September 2001
- Inaugurated: 2000
- Owner: Omniplex Cinemas

Height
- Height: 62 m (203 ft)

Technical details
- Structural system: Steel frame

Other information
- Seating capacity: 4,300

Omniplex Glasgow (formerly UGC Glasgow Renfrew Street and Cineworld Glasgow Renfrew Street) is a cinema on Renfrew Street, Glasgow, Scotland, located in the north-east of the city centre. The cinema, which was first operated by UGC, then by Cineworld and currently by Omniplex Cinemas, opened in September 2001. The cinema building is located next to Buchanan Bus Station and the Glasgow Royal Concert Hall.

At 62 m (203 ft) tall, the building is the tallest cinema complex in the world. The building is equivalent in height to the 18-storey St Andrew House which stands immediately adjacent.

== History ==
=== Origins and opening ===
The cinema was built on the site of The Glasgow Apollo (1973–1985), which was formerly Green's Playhouse (1927–1973). After the Apollo closed in June 1985, it was demolished in September 1987. The cinema was opened as the UGC Cinema on 21 September 2001. In 2005, it became part of the Cineworld chain, when then-owners UGC sold all of its UK cinemas. Green's Playhouse, the original cinema on the site, previously held a record for being Europe's largest cinema in terms of number of seats (4,368). At over 60 metres (200 ft), and with an entry in the Guinness Book of Records, Cineworld Glasgow became the world's tallest cinema. However, during the cinema's construction, the building design came under heavy criticism from the architecture community.

In 2000, the building was designated the "Carbuncle of the Year" in an internet vote organised by Prospect magazine, its panel of judges criticising the design's contrast with the surrounding area.

By 2003 it was the busiest cinema in the United Kingdom by admissions, having attracted over 1.8 million patrons that year. The building has 18 screens over six levels, and can accommodate over 4,300 people. The building's most distinctive feature is the huge glass curtain wall on the east face, which houses a system of criss-crossing escalators which are lit neon blue at night, although some are more drawn to the large elevator which runs up the side of the building.

=== Omniplex ownership ===
The cinema building was acquired for a reported £7 million in May 2025 by Clydebankbridge Ltd, a subsidiary of Omniplex Cinemas. On 24 July 2025 it was reported the building owner wanted to take back the site. Cineworld confirmed closure of the cinema in August 2025, with the cinema closing following the final screening on 28 September 2025.

Omniplex officially announced on 27 October 2025 they would be refurbishing the cinema and reopening it in summer 2026 under their name. It reopened on 10 July 2026 rebranded as Omniplex.

== See also ==
- List of tallest buildings in Glasgow
