= Screen Cinema =

Former cinema in Dublin, Ireland

- New Metropole (1972–1975); Metropole (1975–1987)
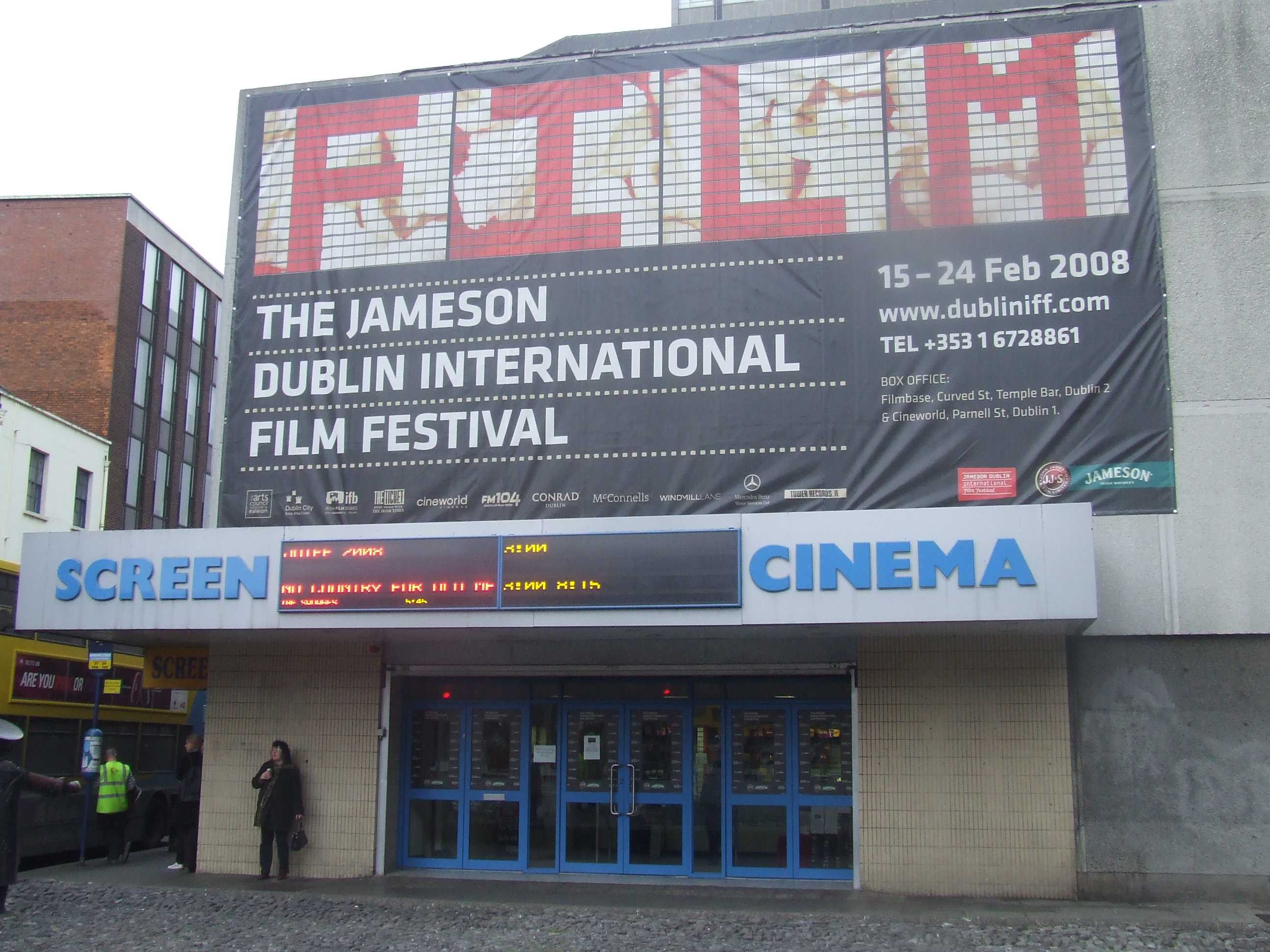
- During the 2008 Jameson Dublin International Film Festival

- Location within Central Dublin
- Address: 2 Townsend Street, Dublin 2 Dublin; Ireland
- Coordinates: 53.346193°N 6.25684°W
- Owner: Irish Multiplex Cinemas (IMC)
- Capacity: 783
- Type: Cinema
- Screen: 3 (originally 1)

Construction
- Opened: 16 March 1972
- Closed: 29 February 2016
- Rebuilt: 1982
- Years active: 35
- Architects: Thomas Bennett; H.J. Lyons & Partners

Website
- screencinema.ie

The Screen Cinema was a three-screen cinema in Hawkins Street, Dublin, Ireland. Originally opened in the 1970s as a single-screen cinema, it closed in 2016 and was demolished in 2018.

== History ==
The cinema had been operating since 1984, showing world cinema, and independent and Irish films. The Screen Cinema, originally named The New Metropole, opened on 16 March 1972 on the corner of Hawkins Street and Townsend Street on the site of the previous cinema, The Regal, which had been demolished since 1962 to make way for offices. The New Metropole name derived from the more famous Metropole Cinema on O'Connell Street (Penney's department store now occupies the building), and after the latter closed in 1973, the New Metropole became the Metropole.

Originally a single screen cinema, the auditorium was subdivided in 1982 to create two additional auditoria. The new screens were suspended from the ceiling, meaning the main screen was not reduced.

In 1984, it was renamed the Screen Cinema, which became the sister cinema to the more well known Savoy Cinema on O'Connell Street. After this, the Screen showed more unusual, independent, and foreign language films rather than mainstream Hollywood films, which attracted a cult audience to the cinema.

The Screen received a face-lift between 2004 and 2005 when the interior was upgraded and the cinema lost its original marquee and neon sign in favour of an electronic board displaying the programme.

Despite its unusual layout, the cinema has maintained a steady flow of cinema-goers, and thrives on art house films, usually keeping the most successful releases running until just before DVD release. The Screen has hosted the Jameson Dublin International Film Festival since its inception in 2002, and in 2007 alone, 48 films were screened over the six days the venue was in use. Celebrity festival visitors have included Wim Wenders, Julie Walters, John Boorman, and Eduardo Noriega.

In the summer of 2009, the Screen showed a season of classic films which included All About Eve, Casablanca, The Apartment, Brief Encounter, Guys and Dolls, and The Great Escape. Hallowe'en's "Scream Cinema Monster Mash" offered audiences Ghost, Child's Play, The Shining, Evil Dead II, The Thing, Night of the Living Dead, and the surprise film, The Mist, in black and white.

The latest series of classics shown was the "Ministry of Musicals" which featured the best Hollywood musicals and contemporary classics. The programme of films screened included Oklahoma!, Singin' in the Rain, An American in Paris, Meet Me in St. Louis, The Last Waltz, Labyrinth, This Is Spinal Tap, and Cry-Baby.

It was reported in February 2012 that the George's Quay Local Area Plan, prepared by Dublin City Council to regenerate Dublin's southeast inner city, indicated that the Screen Cinema could be demolished and later re-housed in replacement property development in the Hawkins Street area. In the same month, another report suggested that the cinema was in danger of closing altogether – in the previous decade, audience numbers fell from 200,000 to 60,000 per annum.

== Closure ==
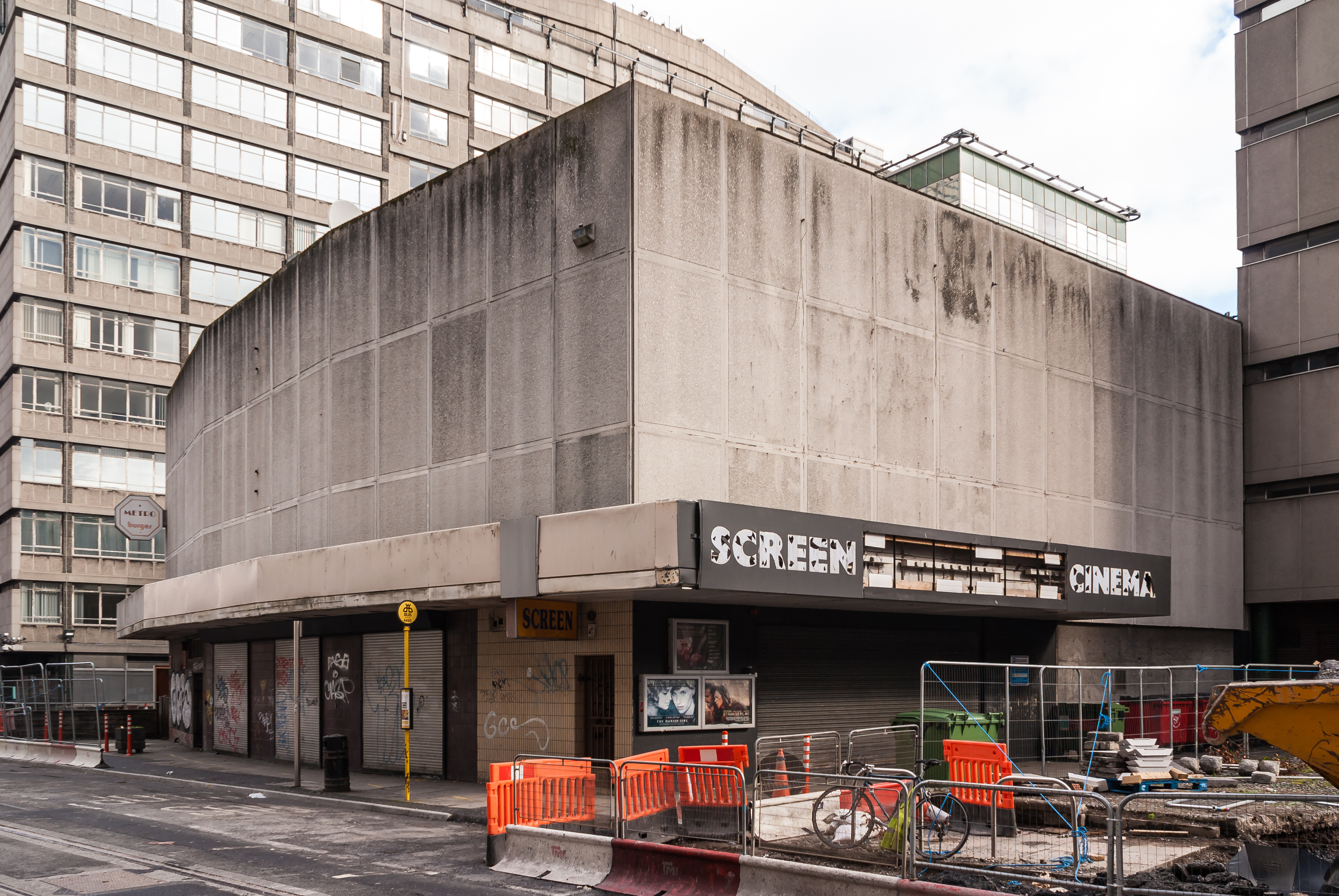
The Screen Cinema in 2017 (following closure and prior to demolition)

On the 19 February 2016, after 35 years in operation, it was announced that the Screen Cinema would be closing its doors to the public as a result of falling ticket sales. It was hinted that Irish Multiplex Cinemas, parent company of Screen Cinema, were to close and sell the cinema a year earlier due to a drop in audience numbers. Staff working in Screen Cinema were said to be offered redundancy packages but this was later withdrawn by IMC and staff were instead offered to be transferred to the Savoy Cinema on O'Connell Street (another cinema in the IMC Group). It was said that all staff would be transferred to the Savoy Cinema with a redundancy package being available from the 29 February 2016.

The Screen Cinema was demolished during 2018.

== Mr. Screen ==
The caricature sculpture of a cinema usher, entitled Mr. Screen, which stood outside the Screen Cinema was created in 1988 by sculptor, Vincent Browne. It is now located in the lobby of the Savoy Cinema, O'Connell Street.

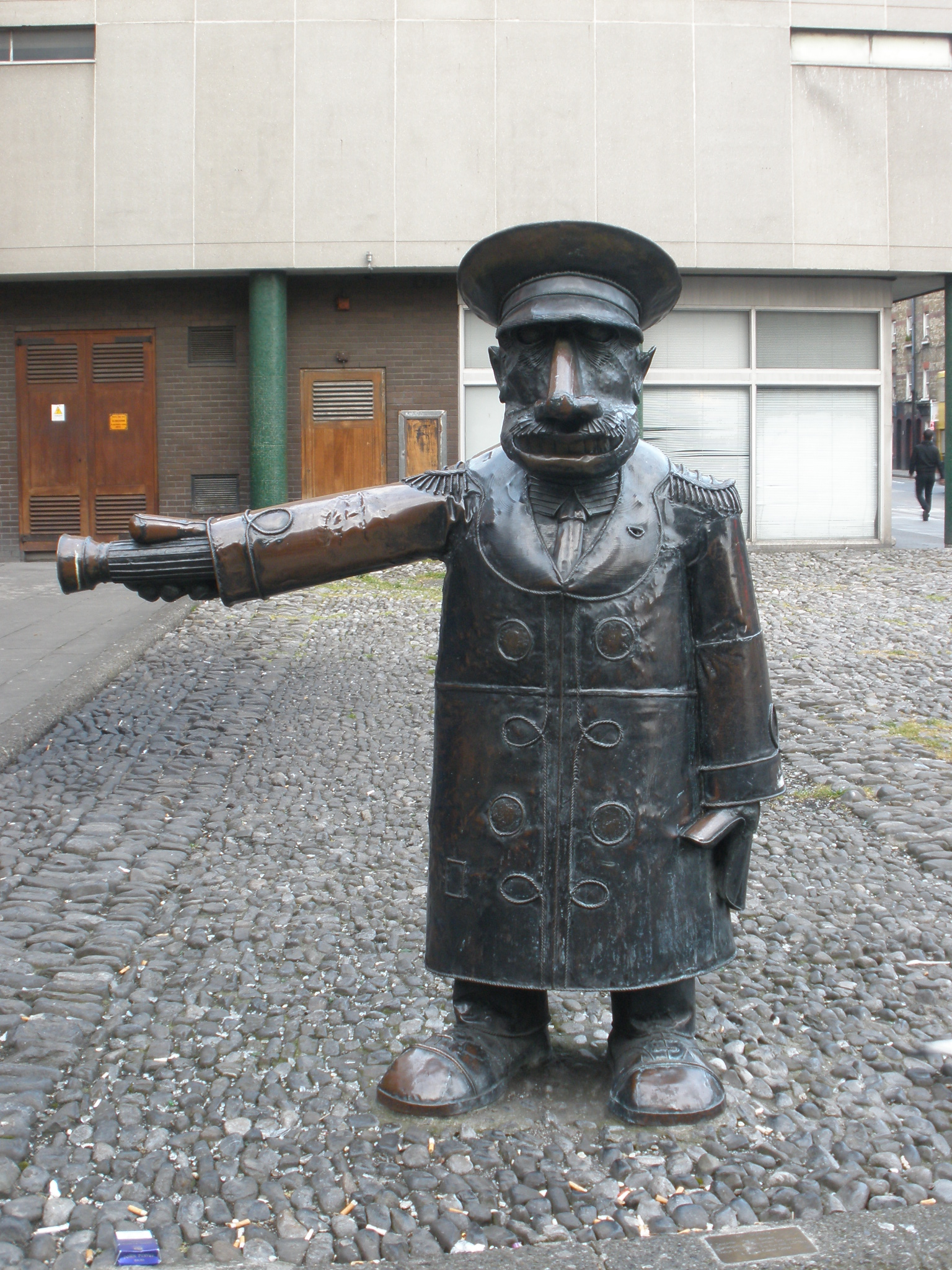
Mr. Screen statue outside the Screen Cinema

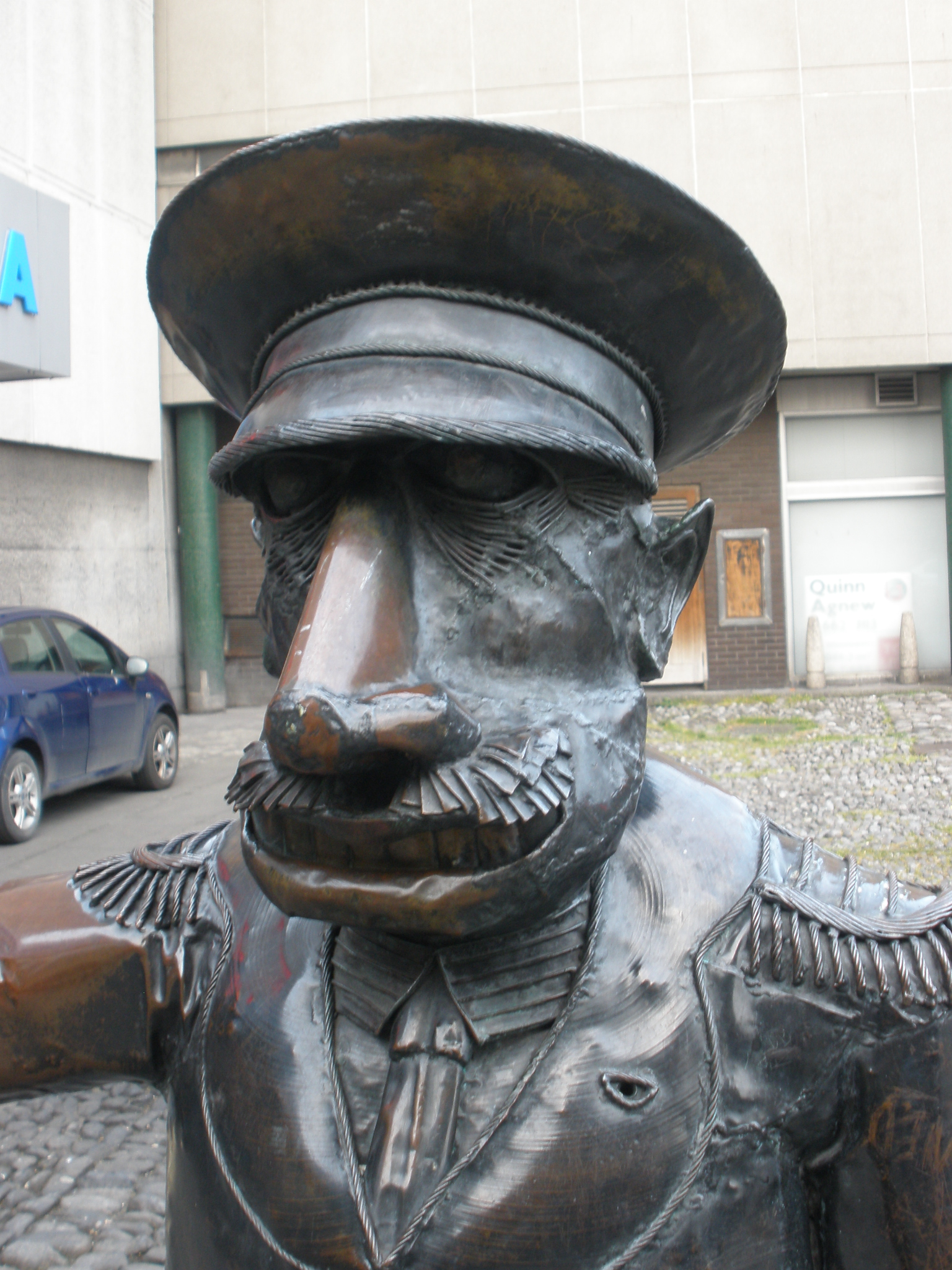
Cinema usher statue by sculptor Vincent Browne

== See also ==
- College Square (Dublin), development on the former site of the Screen Cinema
