= Cinema City Poland =

Brand of multiplex cinemas in Europe

Cinema City Poland Sp. z o.o.
- Company type: Ltd.
- Industry: Cinemas
- Founded: 1999 Cinema City International
- Headquarters: Warsaw, Poland
- Key people: Eduardo Acuna, CEO Eric Foss, Chairman Javier Sotomayor, President of CCI
- Revenue: Unknown
- Number of employees: ~1000
- Website: www.cinema-city.pl

Cinema City is a brand of multiplex cinemas in eastern and central Europe, run by the Regal Cineworld Group - a British-American, the world's second-largest, cinema operator. In Europe it has cinemas in Romania, Bulgaria, Hungary, Poland, Czech Republic and Slovakia. In Poland, Cinema City has almost 40% of the multiplex market.

== Current multiplex locations ==
1. Warsaw - Sadyba – 12 screens (2959 seats) including IMAX (2D: 383 seats, 3D: 366 seats)
2. Warsaw - Bemowo – 11 screens (2400 seats)
3. Warsaw - Galeria Mokotów – 14 screens (3248 seats)
4. Warsaw - Janki – 10 screens (1966 seats)
5. Warsaw - Promenada – 13 screens (2849 seats)
6. Warsaw - Arkadia – 15 screens (2798 seats) including 4DX
7. Warsaw - Białołęka Galeria Północna – 11 screens (2040 seats) including 1 screen with Dolby Atmos
8. Kraków - Zakopianka – 10 screens (2218 seats)
9. Kraków - Galeria Kazimierz – 10 screens (1813 seats)
10. Kraków - Bonarka City Center – 20 screens (3234 seats) including 4DX and 3 VIP screens (23+29+47 seats)
11. Wrocław - Korona – 9 screens (2027 seats)
12. Wrocław - Wroclavia – 20 screens (3060 seats) including: IMAX (2D: 406 seats, 3D: 375 seats), 4DX, 3 VIP screens (48+48+48 seats), 3 screens with Dolby Atmos
13. Poznań - Poznań Plaza – 9 screens (2510 seats) including IMAX (2D: 445 seats, 3D: 410 seats)
14. Poznań - Kinepolis – 18 screens (6661 seats) (all screens are certificated by THX)
15. Katowice - Punkt 44 – 13 screens (2870 seats) including IMAX (2D: 376 seats, 3D: 366 seats)
16. Katowice - Silesia City Center – 13 screens (2900 seats)
17. Częstochowa - Wolność – 8 screens (1766 seats)
18. Częstochowa - Galeria Jurajska – 8 screens (1330 seats)
19. Toruń - Czerwona Droga – 12 screens (2495 seats)
20. Toruń - Toruń Plaza – 8 screens (1332 seats)
21. Lublin - Lublin Plaza – 8 screens (1548 seats)
22. Lublin - Atrium Felicity – 9 screens (1672 seats) including 4DX
23. Łódź - Manufaktura – 14 screens (2591 seats) including IMAX (2D: 399 seats, 3D: 380 seats) and 4DX
24. Bydgoszcz - Focus Mall – 13 screens (2256 seats) including 4DX
25. Zielona Góra - Focus Mall „Polska Wełna” – 9 screens (1305 seats)
26. Wałbrzych - Galeria Victoria – 7 screens (1589 seats)
27. Gliwice - FORUM – 13 screens (2333 seats)
28. Sosnowiec - Sosnowiec Plaza – 6 screens (874 seats)
29. Ruda Śląska - Ruda Śląska Plaza – 8 screens (1557 seats)
30. Rybnik - Rybnik Plaza – 8 screens (1537 seats)
31. Bytom - Agora Bytom – 8 screens (1358 seats)
32. Bielsko-Biała - Gemini Park – 10 screens (1528 seats)
33. Starogard Gdański - Galeria Neptun – 6 screens (1019 seats)
34. Cieszyn - Galeria Stela - 4 screens (430 seats)

== Current IMAX locations ==
Cinema City has exclusive rights for operating IMAX technology theatres in Poland. It currently runs six IMAX theatres, alongside its multiplexes in:

- Warsaw (Sadyba)
- Łódź (Manufaktura) - IMAX Laser
- Wrocław (Wroclavia)
- Poznań (Poznań Plaza)
- Katowice (Punkt 44)
- Kraków (Zakopianka) - IMAX Laser

== Merger ==
In 2002 Cinema City took over Polish cinemas belonging to Ster Century Company, which withdrew from the Polish market. Cinema City started operating the following multiplexes: Janki, Promenada and Galeria Mokotów in Warsaw and Korona in Wrocław.

This was followed in 2003 by the takeover of Krewetka multiplex in Gdańsk, then owned by Superkino (part of Vision Film Distribution company).

== See also ==
- Cinema City Hungary
- Cinema City Czech Republic
- Rav-Hen
