= Mooky Greidinger =

Israeli businessman (born 1952)

- מוקי גרידינגר
- Born: Moshe Joseph Greidinger; 12 December 1952 (age 72); Haifa, Israel
- Education: Hebrew University of Jerusalem
- Occupation: Businessman
- Mother: Dahlia Greidinger

Moshe "Mooky" Joseph Greidinger (Hebrew: מוקי גרידינגר; born 12 December 1952) is an Israeli businessman. He was the chief executive officer (CEO) of Cineworld, the world's second largest cinema chain. Together with his brother Israel, they owned 29% of the company. On 31 July 2023, it was announced that Mooky and his brother will leave Cineworld, after the company entered Chapter 11 process in September 2022. His family has had interests in the cinema business since the 1930s.

== Early life, family and education ==
Moshe Joseph Greidinger, known as "Mooky", was born in Haifa to Dahlia Greidinger née Katzenelbogen-Katz (1926–1979), a scientist who helped develop the country's chemical industry, and Kalman Kenneth "Kenny" Greidinger, whose father Moshe Greidinger and mother Rebecca Chissick Greidinger had emigrated from Romania and had business interests in food, shipping, and real estate. Mooky has a brother, Israel, who works alongside him.

Greidenger graduated from the Hebrew Reali School in Haifa, Israel in 1970. He later studied economics at the Hebrew University of Jerusalem in Israel.

== Career ==
Greidenger's paternal grandfather Moshe Greidinger invested in his first cinema, Ein Dor, in Hadar, Haifa, in 1930. He opened the Armon cinema in Haifa in 1935. After his death in 1946, his son Kenny expanded the cinema business. Young Mooky worked at the ticket desk, in the projection room, and as an usher in his father's cinemas throughout his school years. He joined his father's business in 1976, and encouraged the company—now called Cinema City International—to expand overseas with a location in Hungary in 1997.

In May 2014, Greidinger joined the board of directors of Cineworld as CEO, having previously been CEO of Cinema City International. Cinema City International was Europe's third largest cinema operator until its takeover by Cineworld in 2014. Following the takeover, Cinema City owned 24.9% of the combined Cineworld group. In 2017, Cineworld announced its agreement to acquire Regal Entertainment Group for $3.6 billion, giving it more than 9,500 screens in 10 countries.

In 2020, Cineworld was due to buy Canada's Cineplex Entertainment for US$2.1 billion, making it the world's largest cinema chain (ahead of AMC Theatres) with over 11,000 screens. However, on 12 June 2020, Cineworld abandoned the takeover before the end of June deadline, citing "certain breaches" of contract, and a legal battle is likely. In July Cineworld sued Cineplex for $1.1 billion in damages; Cineplex planned to counter-sue for around $12 million.

As of January 2020, Greidinger and his brother Israel Greidinger, who is deputy CEO of the company, own 29% of Cineworld. According to a Globes article of January 2020, "Those who know the Greidingers say they are not so much consumed with making money as becoming the world's number one cinema chain".

In March 2020, at the beginning of the COVID-19 pandemic, the attendance at the theaters decreased dramatically, and many were forced to be closed. This resulted in a major drop in Cineworld business, and in September 2022 it applied for bankruptcy protection at a US court.

In July 2023, it was announced that Greidinger would be stepping down as chief executive of Cineworld.

== Personal life ==
Greidinger resides in Haifa, Israel. He has two sons and one daughter. His son, Idan, has a management position in the company.
