= Cinema City International =

International cinema operator

Cinema City
- Company type: Subsidiary
- Industry: Entertainment and media
- Founded: 1929; 97 years ago
- Founder: Moshe Greidinger (senior)
- Headquarters: Rotterdam, Netherlands (registered office)
- Area served: Central and Eastern Europe, Israel
- Key people: Mooky Greidinger (CEO)
- Services: Movie theaters
- Revenue: €267.45 million (2011)
- Operating income: €24.72 million (2011)
- Net income: €21.37 million (2011)
- Total assets: €340.24 million (2011)
- Total equity: €229.30 million (2011)
- Owner: Cineworld Group plc
- Number of employees: 4,000
- Subsidiaries: Forum Film, New Age Media
- Website: en.cinemacity.nl

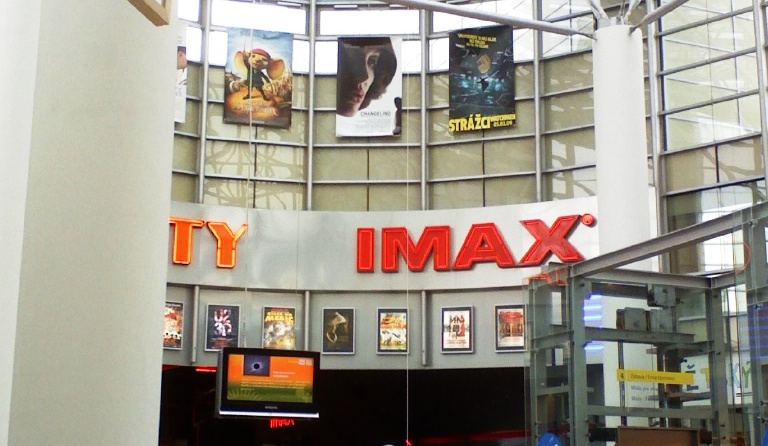
IMAX theatre in Prague

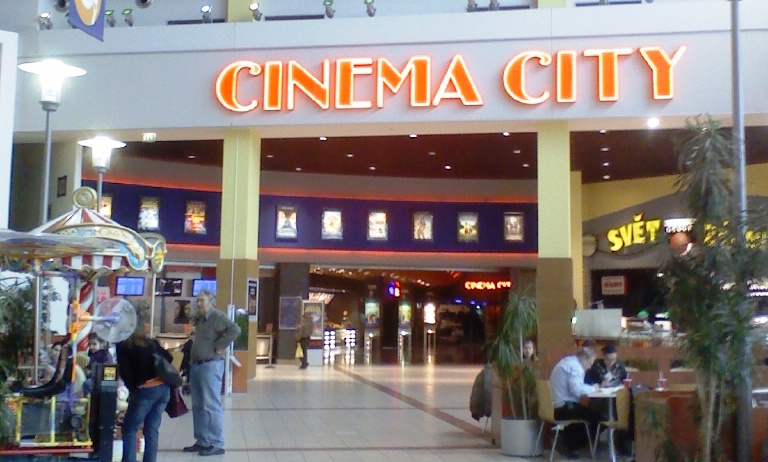
Cinema City in Prague

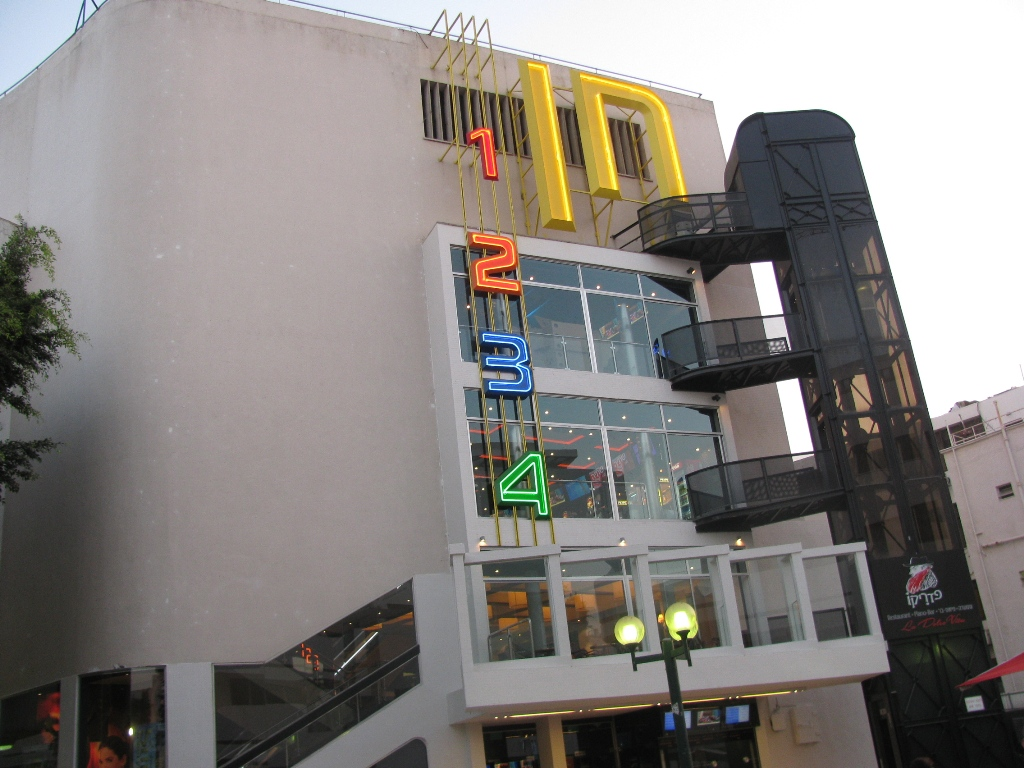
Rav-Chen Cinema in Tel Aviv

Cinema City is a Rotterdam-based cinema operator. Owned by Regal Cineworld and first established in Haifa, Israel, it operates 99 multiplexes and 966 screens across Central and Eastern Europe under the Cinema City banner, and in Israel under the Planet and Rav-Chen banners; it is the third largest film exhibitor in Europe. It also conducts film distribution via its subsidiary Forum Film, and cinema advertising via its subsidiary New Age Media.

Cinema City International also has real estate holdings in Bulgaria, Israel and Poland, including the Mall of Rousse and other plots of land in Bulgaria, plots of land designated to develop an amusement park in Poland, an indirect interest of 39.78% in Ronson Europe NV and an office building in Herzliya, Israel and five other properties in Israel. In 2014, Cinema City International sold its cinema business to British exhibitor Cineworld for approximately £503 million, with the company retaining its real estate assets and taking an approximately 25% minority stake in Cineworld Group.

== History ==
The Greidinger family, the majority owners of Cinema City International N.V., started their cinema business in Haifa, Israel, Moshe Greidinger (grandfather of the company's current CEO also named Moshe Greidinger) started building his first cinema in 1929, which was opened in 1931 as Ein Dor. In 1935, he opened his second cinema in Haifa, Armon Cinema (palace in Hebrew), a large art-deco building that contained 1,800 seats. Armon Cinema became the heart of Haifa’s entertainment district; due to its large capacity, the cinema was often used for performances by the Israel Philharmonic Orchestra and the Israeli Opera.

In 1958, the family expanded to Tel Aviv, by acquiring the Chen cinema in Dizengoff Square. They expanded further by opening additional cinemas in Israel, among them the Armon Cinema in Ramat-Gan in the mid 1960s. In 1967, the family entered the film distribution business when it acquired a company named Forum Film. In 1982 the "Chen" cinema was turned into the first cinema multiplex in Israel.

=== International expansion ===
In 1997, the international expansion of the business started, Cinema City International N.V. (CCI) was established and opened its first cinema in Budapest, Hungary, and by 2005 was the largest multiplex operator in Hungary. In 1999 CCI started in Poland and by 2005 had 12 multiplex theaters there. In 1999, CCI bought the only existing multiplex theater in Prague in the Czech Republic. It also operates multiplex cinemas in Bulgaria, Romania and Slovakia.

In 2005, CCI opened its distribution office, Forum Hungary in Budapest. The company represents Disney, Spyglass and Revolutionary Releasing in Hungary. In the first six months of 2006 it became the second biggest film distribution company in the country.

=== IPO on the Warsaw Stock Exchange ===
In December 2006, Cinema City International had an initial public offering on the Warsaw Stock Exchange at a price of 19.30 zloty per share ($6.765), raising $106 million at a company value of $343 million after money. The underwriters of the initial public offering were Bank Austria Creditanstalt and ING Group. The company chose to list on the Warsaw Stock Exchange, since Poland became its major market, representing about 40% of the group's total revenues.

=== Acquisition by Cineworld ===
In January 2014, it was announced that British exhibitor Cineworld would acquire Cinema City's cinema business in a cash and stock deal valued at approximately £503 million, with Cinema City International taking a 24.9% stake in Cineworld and retaining its real estate assets. Cinema City International CEO Mooky Greidinger was also named the new CEO of Cineworld as a whole.

In December 2022, Forum Film and Greidinger were sentenced to fines and a six-month suspended sentence for violations of competition law relating to its 2010 acquisition of competing distributor Matalon; Forum had violated the regulatory terms of the merger by colluding against a competing cinema chain to prevent them from screening eight specific films distributed by the company.

== See also ==
- Cinema of Israel
- Economy of Israel
- Cinema City Czech Republic
- Cinema City Hungary
- Cinema City Poland
