= Regal Global Entertainment =

British cinema chain

- Type: Public
- Traded as: LSE: CINE
- Industry: Entertainment
- Founded: 1995; 31 years ago
- Headquarters: London, England, UK; Grand Cayman, Cayman Islands
- Key people: Eduardo Acuna (CEO)
- Revenue: ▲£1.8 Billion(2021)
- Operating income: ▲£15.8 million (2021)
- Net income: ▲£(565.8) million (2021)
- Number of employees: 28,000 (2023)
- Parent: Cineworld Parent Limited
- Subsidiaries: Cineworld Cinemas; Regal Cinemas; Cinema City International; Picturehouse Cinemas; Digital Cinema Media (50%)
- Website: regalcineworld.com cineworld.co.uk

Cineworld Cinemas logo used since 2008

Regal Global Entertainment (formerly known as Cineworld Group and Regal Cineworld) is a British cinema chain and operator. Headquartered in London, England, it is the world's second-largest cinema chain after AMC Theatres, with 9,139 screens across 747 sites in 10 countries: Bulgaria, Czech Republic, Hungary, Ireland, Israel, Poland, Romania, Slovakia, the United Kingdom and the United States. The group's primary brands are Cineworld Cinemas and Picturehouse in the United Kingdom and Ireland, Cinema City in Eastern and Central Europe, Planet in Israel, and Regal Cinemas in the United States.

As of March 2018, Cineworld was the leading cinema operator in the UK by box office market share (based on revenue). It operated, at that time, 99 cinemas and over 1,017 screens, including Cineworld Dublin—Ireland's single largest multiplex by screens and customer base.

== History ==
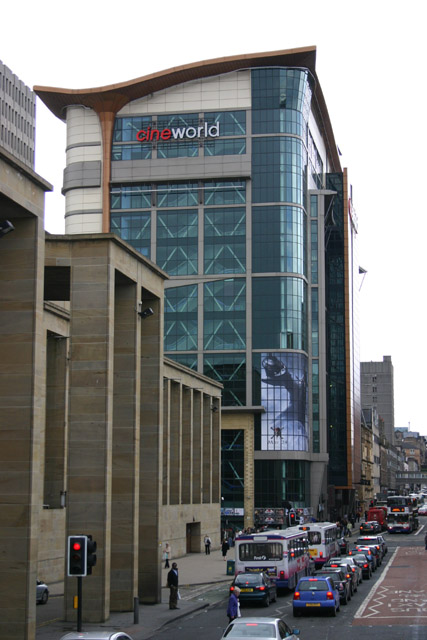
Former Cineworld in Glasgow, Scotland. The world's tallest cinema

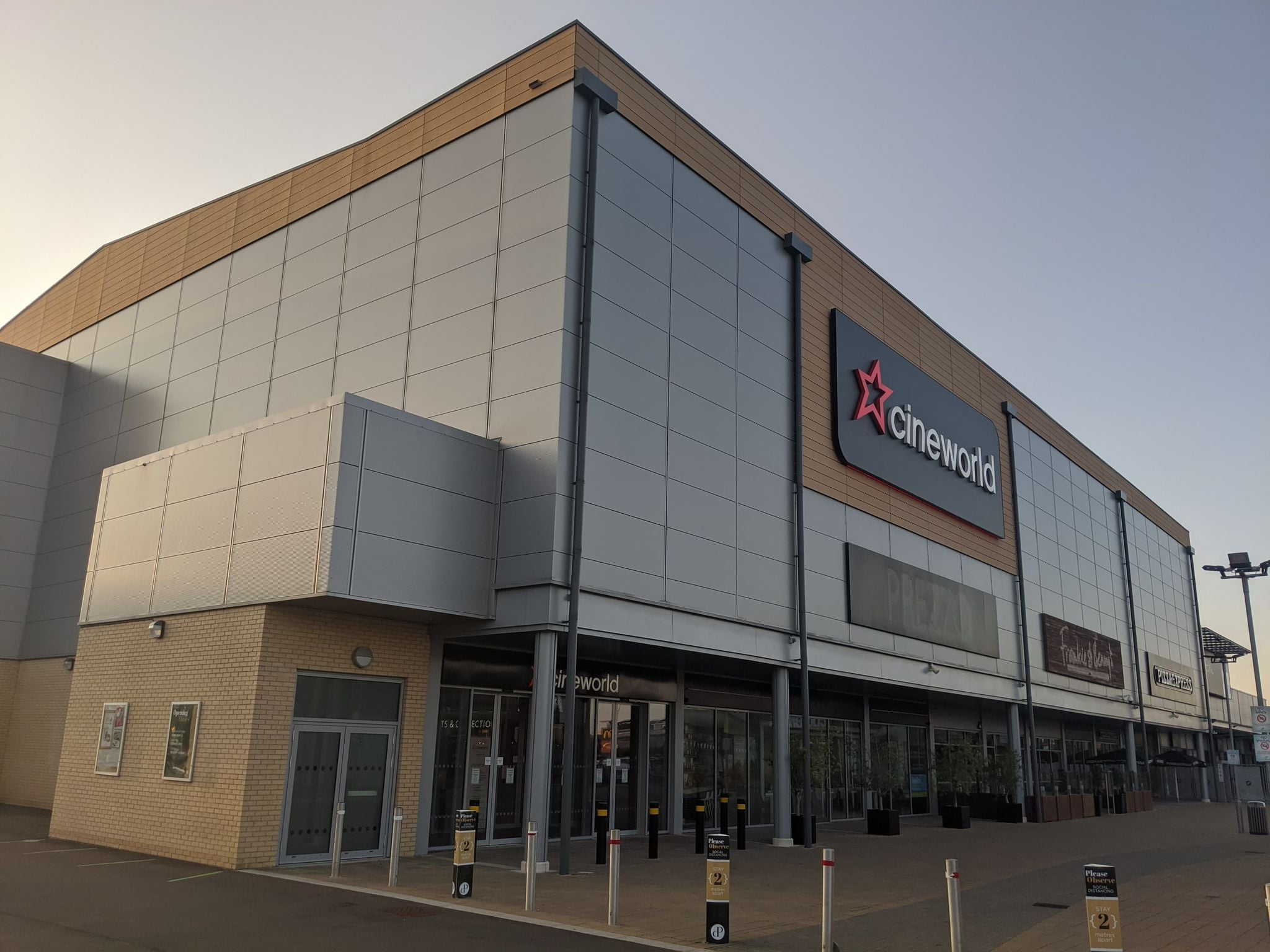
Cineworld at Dalton Park, near Seaham, England

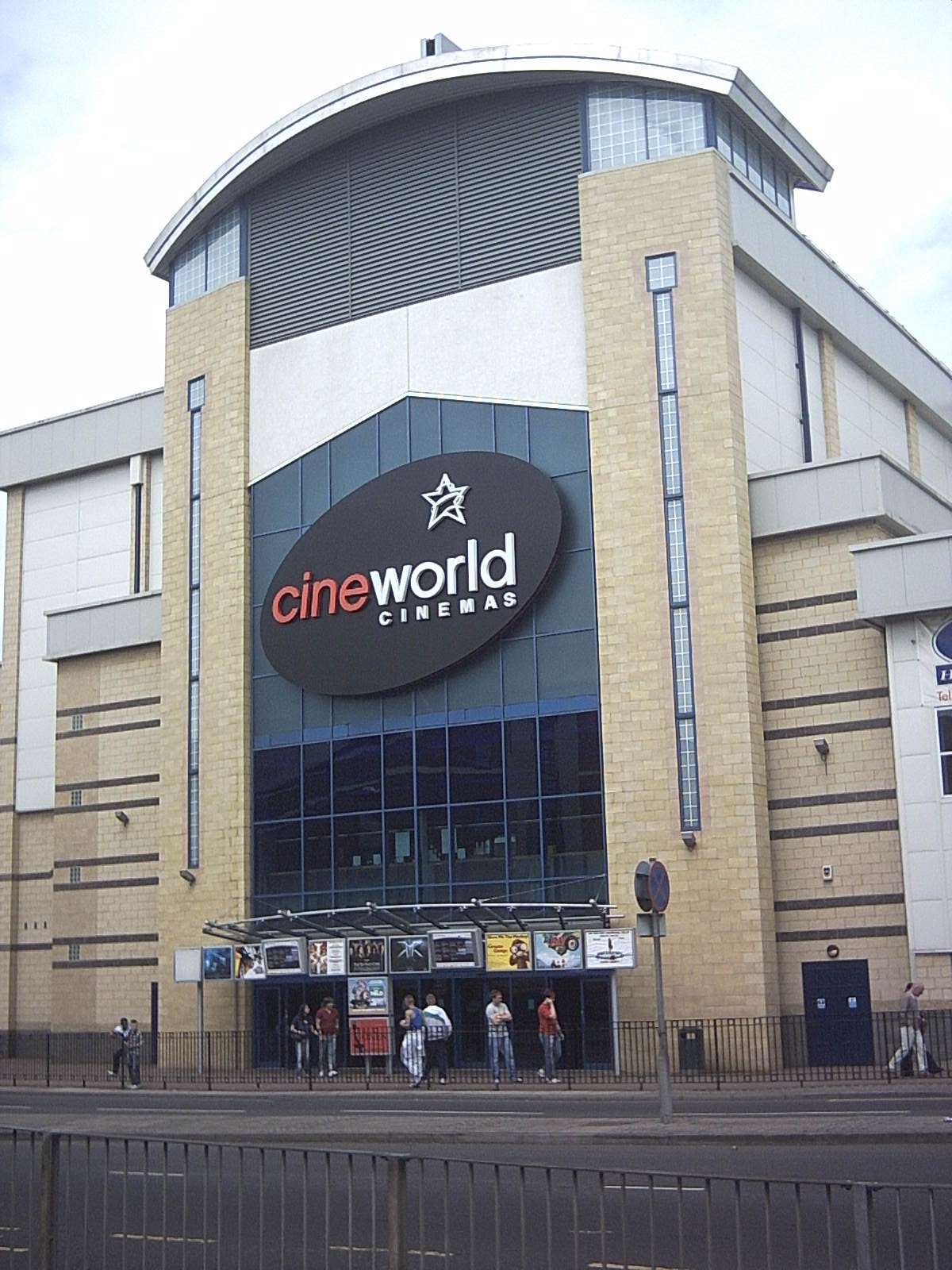
Cineworld in Middlesbrough, England

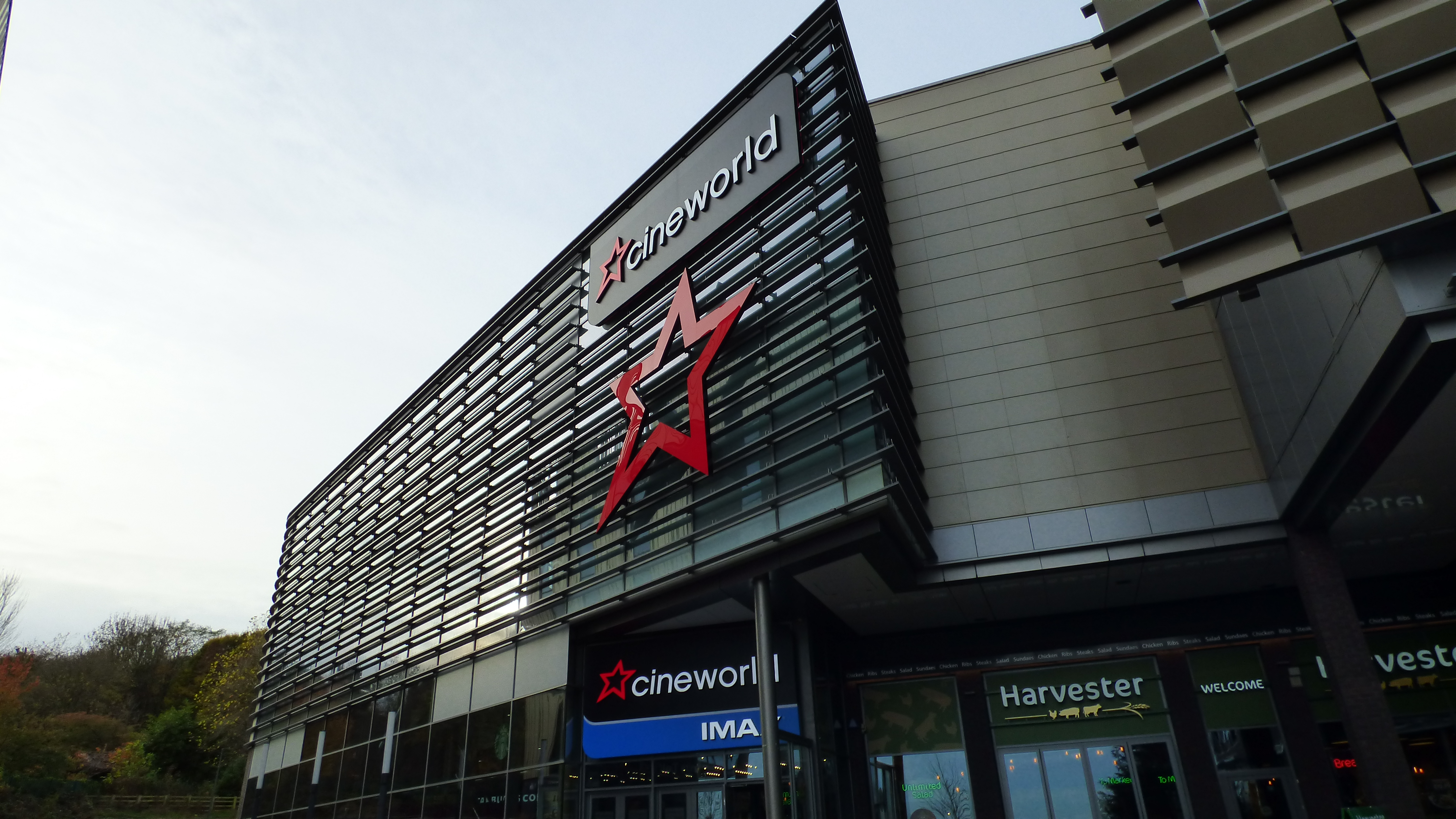
Cineworld in Telford, England

Cineworld was founded by Steve Wiener in 1995. The first Cineworld cinema opened in Stevenage, Hertfordshire in July 1996. A second cinema opened in Wakefield, West Yorkshire, in December 1996 and the third opened in Feltham, London in July 1997. In 2004, Cineworld was acquired by Blackstone private equity group for £120m. The following year, Cineworld acquired the UK and Ireland operations of French cinema company UGC.

In December 2012, Cineworld acquired the Picturehouse Cinema chain, adding 21 cinemas to its portfolio, including The Little Theatre in Bath, Brighton's Duke of York's cinema, the Cameo, Edinburgh, the Phoenix in Oxford and the Ritzy Cinema in Brixton.

The Blackstone Group, which had invested in Cineworld when it was privately owned, sold its entire remaining 20% shareholding in November 2010. In August 2013, The Guardian revealed that Cineworld employs 80% of its 4,300 staff on zero hour contracts. In October 2013, the Chester location was closed due to the landowner wanting to develop the land into a supermarket.

In 2014, Cineworld's Picturehouse chain was subject to industrial action owing to its refusal to pay the London living wage to its staff. The workforce attracted the support of Eric Cantona. On 27 February 2014, Cineworld completed the takeover of Cinema City International N.V. As of March 2015, the Greidinger family (who owned a controlling 54% stake in Cinema City International) held a controlling bloc as the largest shareholder in the enlarged company. In May 2014, Mooky Greidinger joined the board of directors as CEO, having previously been CEO of Cinema City International.

In 2015, Picturehouse unveiled their new West End flagship site, ‘Picturehouse Central’, a 1,000-seat seven-screen cinema on Shaftesbury Avenue near Piccadilly Circus in central London. In August 2016, Cineworld acquired six cinemas from Empire Cinemas, including the Empire Theatre in London's West End, and 4 other locations in Basildon, Poole, Bromley and Hemel Hempstead. Empire Newcastle was also acquired by Cineworld the following year.

In November 2017, Cineworld began merger talks with the US cinema chain Regal Cinemas. On 5 December, it was officially announced that Cineworld would buy Regal for US$3.6 billion (£2.7 billion), creating the world's second-largest cinema group. It would also allow Cineworld access to the US market, the largest in the world. The acquisition was completed in 2018. In March 2019, Cineworld and Eagle Pictures invested in Spyglass Media Group.

On 16 December 2019, Cineworld announced its proposed acquisition of Cineplex Entertainment—Canada's largest cinema chain—for approximately US$2.1 billion. Cineworld planned to integrate its operations with Regal to achieve cost and revenue synergies and maintain the Cineplex branding for the Canadian operations. This would have made it North America's largest cinema chain. The deal was approved by shareholders in February 2020. However, Cineworld would terminate the purchase agreement due to alleged "material adverse effect and breaches" by Cineplex. The company subsequently sued Cineworld over the aborted purchase. In December 2021, the Ontario Superior Court of Justice ordered Cineworld to pay damages of C$1.23 billion for pulling out of the acquisition of Cineplex. This decision caused the Cineworld share price to fall by nearly 30% overnight on the London Stock Exchange. Cineworld said it would appeal the decision.

=== Closure during the COVID-19 pandemic ===
On 17 March 2020, Cineworld and all other cinema companies in the UK temporarily closed all their UK cinemas due to the COVID-19 pandemic. Some 800 staff at Cineworld Group PLC wrote to chief executive Moshe Greidinger requesting their jobs back after many were made redundant "with immediate effect". Employees with over three years of service were told they would be retained with 40% of their salary or average pay. The letter said the move would leave many of the affected unable to afford essentials such as housing and food. In late May 2020, Cineworld announced it planned to reopen all its UK cinemas in July. On 14 August 2020, it announced a new reopening schedule, in which their Welsh cinemas would open on 14 August, whereas their Irish, Scottish and Jersey screens would open on 26 August. Their English cinemas had been open since 31 July.

In May 2020, Alicja Kornasiewicz became chair, having been a non-executive director since May 2015. On 5 October 2020, Cineworld announced the indefinite re-closure of all owned cinemas in the UK, Ireland, and United States from 8 October, citing the delay of major tentpole Hollywood films due to the wider impact of the COVID-19 pandemic on cinema, and its continued inability to reopen cinemas in the key U.S. market of New York (which CEO Mooky Greidinger cited as having resulted in the delays). The decision followed the delay of the James Bond film No Time to Die from November 2020 to 2 April 2021. Greidinger said the delay was the "last straw" for Cineworld following a string of other film delays and cancellations. Cineworld said that its decision would affect 45,000 workers, 5,500 of them in the UK, and 20,000 in the US. Later that month, it hired FTI Consulting, Houlihan Lokey, and AlixPartners to help refinance the company's $8 billion debt.

Greidinger said that Cineworld would reopen the cinemas once there was a "solid lineup of releases" ahead. He also said that its Central European operations would remain active on a case-by-case basis, as they have a stronger dependency on domestic productions than Hollywood productions. Cineworld cinemas reopened in May 2021.

=== Bankruptcy ===
The release of No Time to Die in October 2021 took Cineworld's monthly revenues in the UK and Ireland up to 127% of October 2019's levels. In December, Cineworld's 2021 global revenue reached 88% of 2019's yearly intake. Cineworld credited this to the success of Spider-Man: No Way Home, the only film to have made more than $1.5 billion globally since the pandemic began.

Before the pandemic, Cineworld had a share price of £1.97, which had fallen to 20p by mid-August 2022. That August, the Wall Street Journal reported that Cineworld was considering filing insolvency proceedings in the UK after struggling to rebuild attendance and incurring debts of more than $4.8 billion (£4 billion) following the pandemic. On 7 September 2022, Cineworld filed for Chapter 11 bankruptcy.

In April 2023, Cineworld's stock price dropped 30% due to their plan to discontinue the sale of their business in the UK, US, and Ireland. This decision was made because of the company's inability to find a buyer. Cineworld said it was also open to offers for the purchase of its business in regions other than the aforementioned areas. It announced that it plans to secure funding of $2.26 billion and that it had entered into an agreement with its creditors to restructure its debt and come up with strategies to exit bankruptcy.

In July 2023, Cineworld announced that its chief executive, Mooky Greidinger, would be stepping down. The company's lenders appointed Eduardo Acuna, an executive at Cinépolis, to take his place. On 31 July 2023, Cineworld entered administration in the UK. That same day, Cineworld emerged from Chapter 11 bankruptcy after slashing billions of dollars in debt and the much-needed boost from the Barbenheimer box office success. The company moved operations from the bankrupt Cineworld Group plc corporate entity to a newly created group named Cineworld Parent Limited.

=== Post-bankruptcy ===
In July 2024, Cineworld announced it would close six of its cinemas (later five) across the UK as part of a restructuring plan to bring the company back into profitability. These included Glasgow Parkhead, Bedford, Hinckley, Loughborough, Yate and Swindon Regent Circus. In October 2024, Cineworld canceled plans to open a cinema in Colchester as part of the same restructuring. In October 2024, the closure of the site at Hinckley was reversed as a deal was reached with Hinckley and Bosworth Borough Council to ensure the site stayed open as the town's only cinema.

In December 2024, Cineworld confirmed that it had secured a $1.9 billion debt facility and had adopted the name Regal Cineworld Group. It also announced that it would close another six cinemas, including Castleford, Leigh, Northampton, Middlesbrough, Poole and Weymouth. In May 2025, Omniplex Cinemas acquired Cineworld's Glasgow Renfew Street cinema and evicted Cineworld.

In May 2026, American media executive Brian McAndrews became the new chairman of the company, replacing the outgoing Eric Foss. Concurrently, the company was renamed Regal Global Entertainment.

== Cinemas ==
Across the Cineworld estate there are six different ways in which their customers can watch a movie: 2D, 3D, 4DX, Superscreen, IMAX, and ScreenX. Prices are set according to the format the customer chooses, and not the movie they choose. Across the European estate there are 38 4DX screens and 35 IMAX screens. Out of 45 cinemas in the world that are fitted with IMAX with Laser projection systems, two are in the UK, both belonging to Cineworld, located in Leicester Square and Sheffield. In April 2018, IMAX and Cineworld Group signed an agreement to install 55 new IMAX with Laser experience in Cineworld and Regal IMAX locations.

In 2012, Cineworld began a trial of a premium service, the Screening Rooms. Located next to the Cheltenham cinema, The Screening Rooms offers considerably larger, leather seating, premium food, and 'table' service. The Screening Rooms was later converted into an extended Cineworld in Cheltenham when it was refurbished to become the second Cineworld in the country to offer the new premium VIP format. Sheffield was the first to offer it.

Cineworld was the only cinema chain in the United Kingdom to forbid customers from bringing food and drink bought elsewhere into the cinema. In November 2012, the policy was changed and now states that "neither alcohol nor hot food may be brought onto the premises". In early 2014, Cineworld introduced an allocated seating system, starting as a trial in selected sites including Wembley and rolling out to all their cinemas by the summer. The move was controversial and a Twitter campaign was created against this policy. Cineworld has responded to the criticism stating that it gives customers peace of mind along with other benefits.

In 2017, the company opened nine new cinema locations with a total of 109 screens; four of which were in the UK and five in the rest of Europe. A further 75 screens were scheduled to open in 2018 in addition. Throughout 2018, the company opened 13 new locations with 108 screens in total, six in the United States, six in the United Kingdom and one in Romania.
