= Savoy Cinema =

Cinema in Dublin, Ireland

- IMC Savoy, Savoy Dublin
- The Savoy during the 2006 Jameson Dublin International Film Festival

- Location within Central Dublin
- Address: 16-19 Upper O'Connell Street; Dublin; Ireland
- Coordinates: 53°21′04″N 6°15′38″W
- Owner: IMC Cinema Group
- Capacity: With screen one being split into five the current capacity is unknown (originally 2,789)
- Type: Cinema
- Screen: 13 (originally 1)

Construction
- Opened: 29 November 1929
- Rebuilt: 1969; 1975; 1979; 1988
- Architects: C.F. Mitchell and W.E. Greenwood
- Builders: Meagher & Hayes

Website
- www.imccinemas.ie/Whats-On/Savoy-Dublin

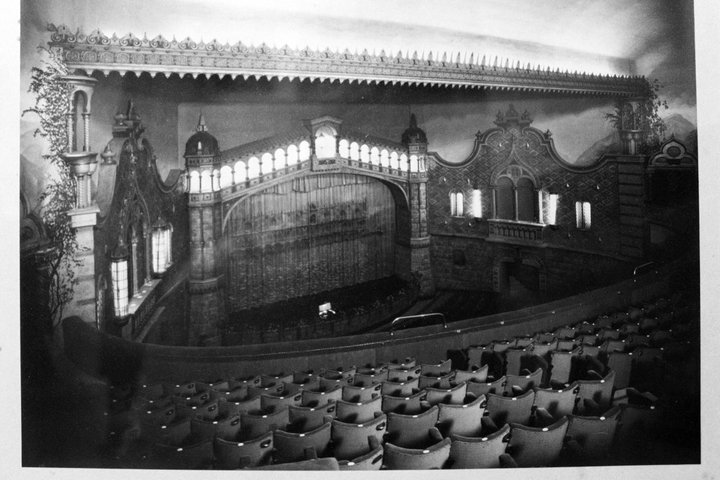
Savoy Cinema auditorium in 1929

The Savoy Cinema on the east side of Upper O'Connell Street in Dublin, Ireland is the oldest operational cinema in Dublin and is the preferred cinema in Ireland for film premières.

== History ==
The cinema was built in 1929 by Meagher & Hayes, on the site of the old Granville Hotel. The luxurious auditorium, housing 2,789 seats, opened to the public with the American colour talkie On with the Show. It was altered in 1954 to incorporate a large CinemaScope screen, and showed Ireland's first widescreen feature, The Robe, at the time owned by Odeon Ireland Ltd.

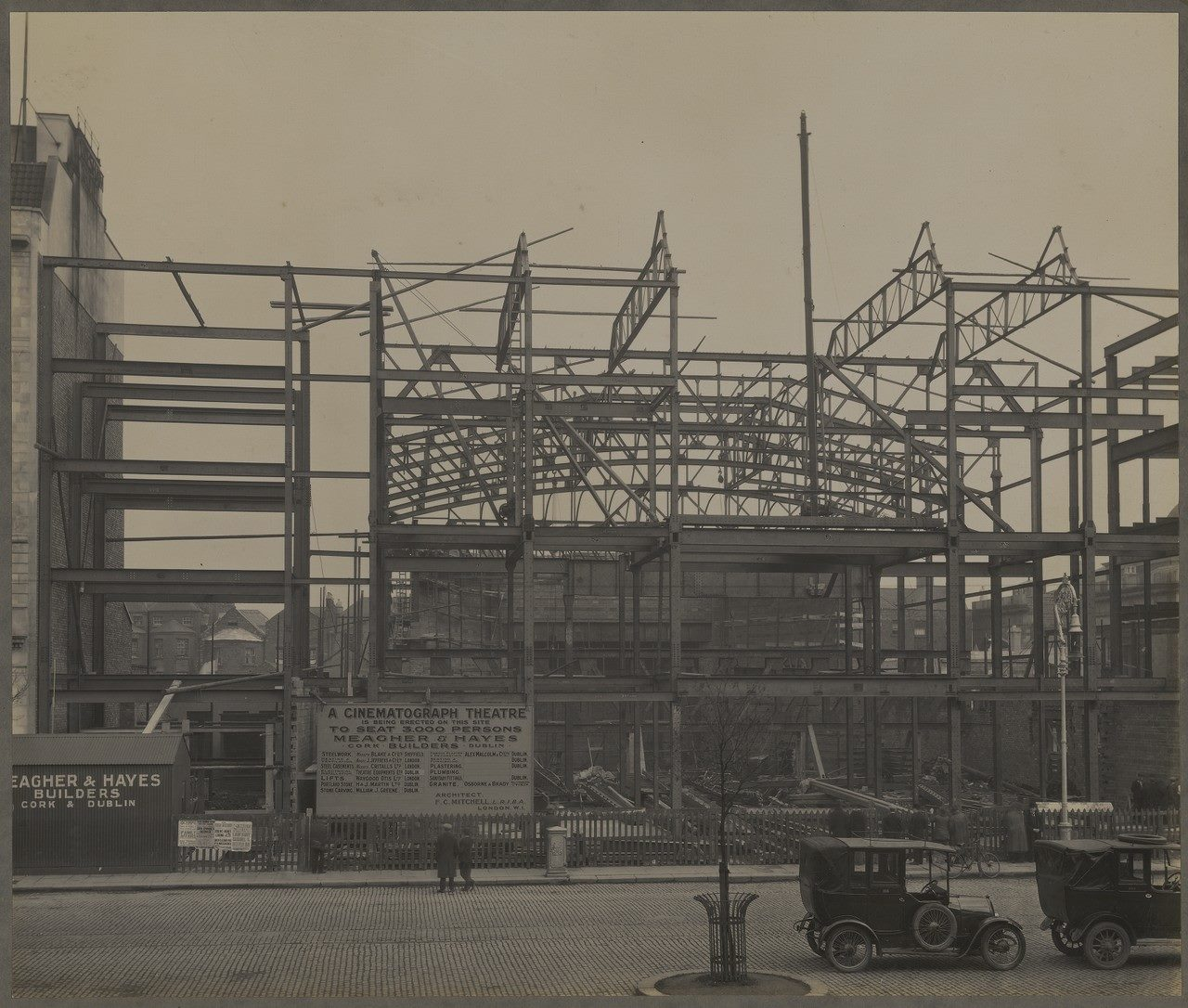
Savoy Cinema Dublin, during construction by Meagher & Hayes, pre-1929

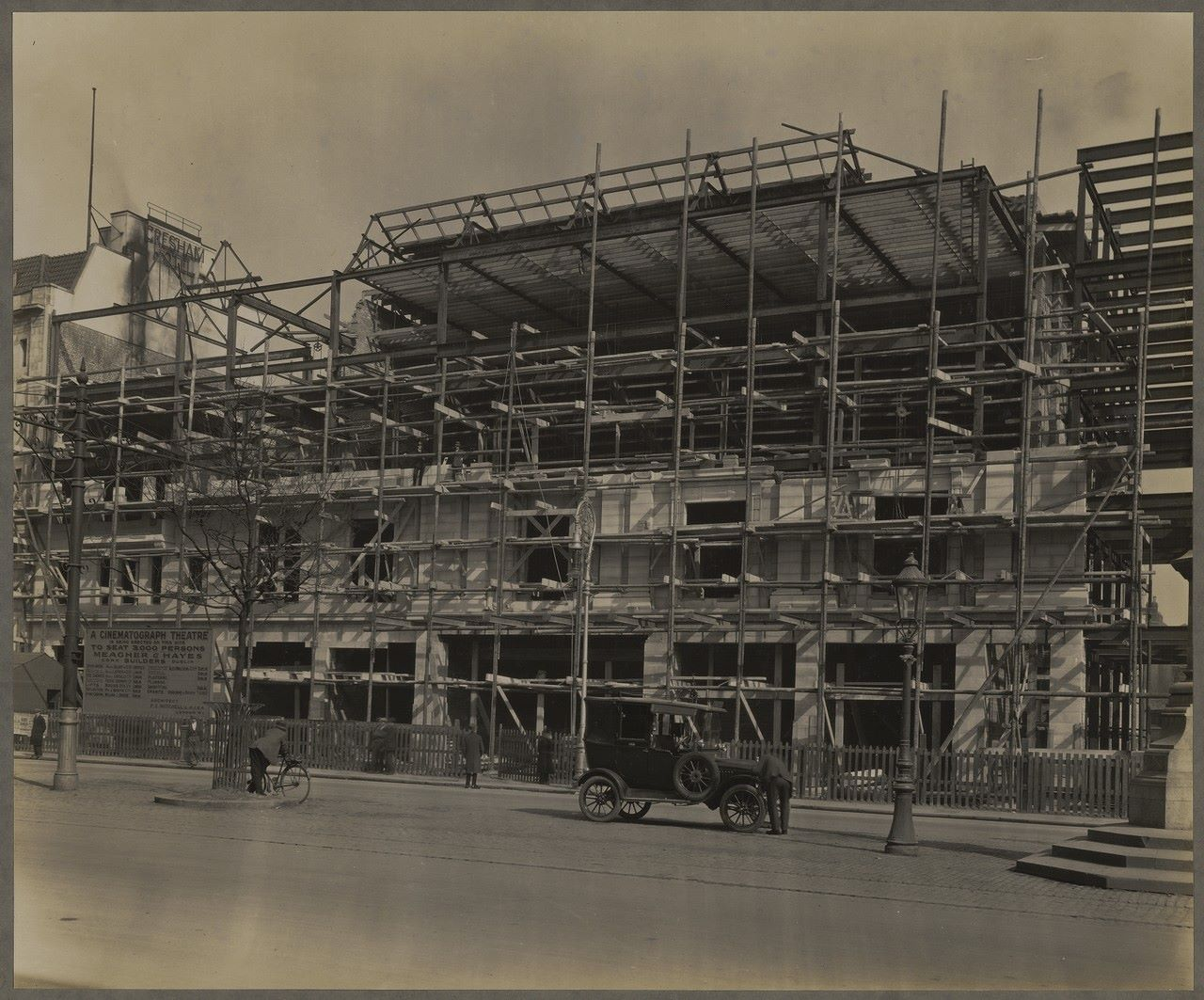
Savoy Cinema Dublin, during construction by Meagher & Hayes, pre-1929 (image 2)

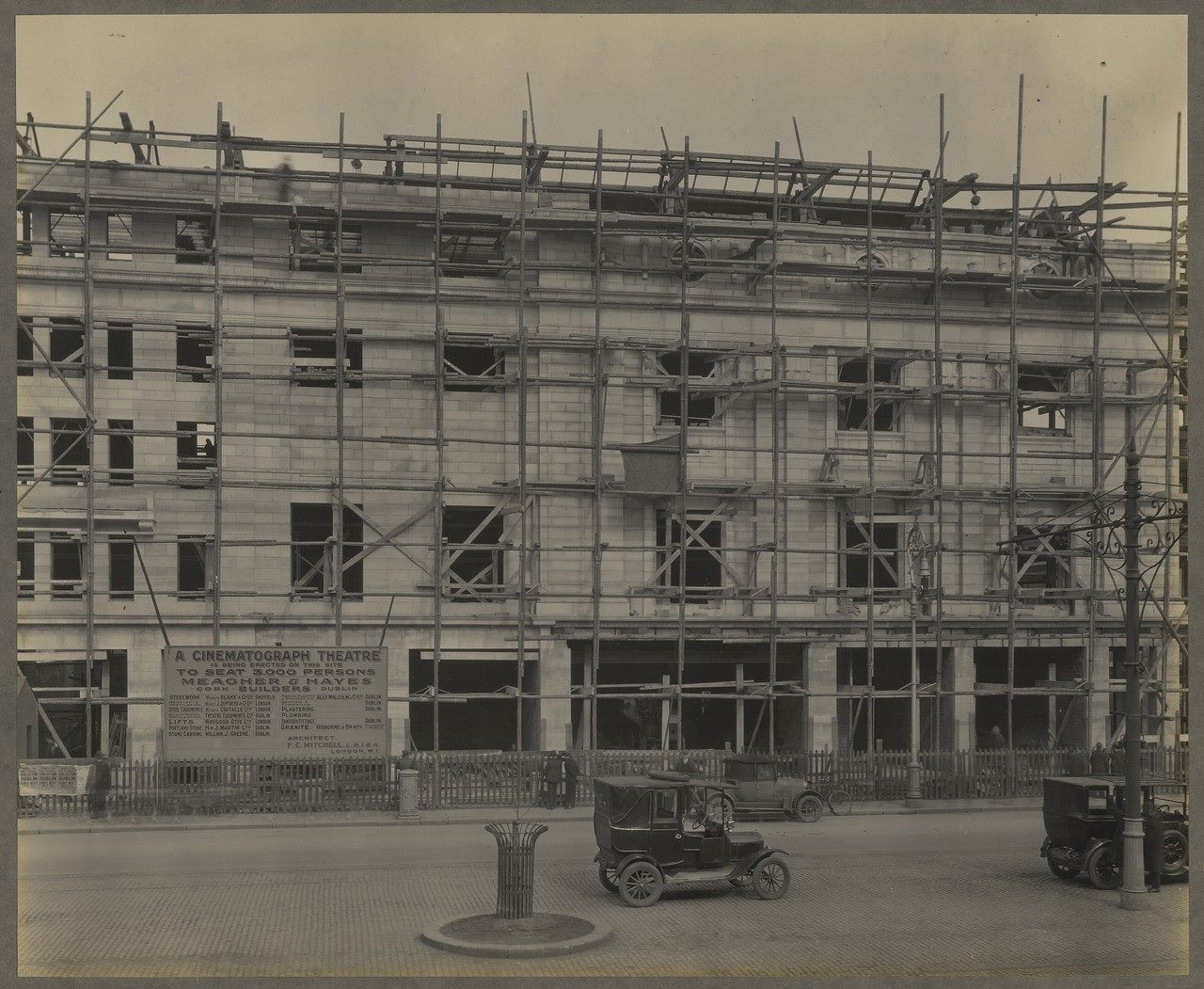
Savoy Cinema Dublin, nearing completion, 1928 or 1929

It was reported in February 2012 that the cinema was in danger of closing. In the previous decade, audience numbers fell from 740,000 to 250,000 per annum.

== Screens ==
The Savoy is the most altered cinema in Dublin's history, and in 1969 the cinema was converted into a twin cinema. In 1975, the Savoy's restaurant was converted into a third screen, holding 200 seats, followed in 1979 by further sub-divisions, creating five screens in all. In 1988, the cinema was given its sixth screen. In the process, the Savoy had lost a third of its capacity.

In 2004, renovation work was carried out, moving the box office from the two booths located on either side of the entrance to what used to be an adjoining shop. The confectionery counter has also been moved many times, it is now in a room to the left of the main entrance.

The Advance Screening Room became the seventh screen in 2014 it is now screen 13.

In 2016, the old Screen 2 (500 seats) was converted into three smaller screens and the Savoy became a 9 screen cinema in Dublin City Centre.

In January 2018, the "iconic" Screen 1 which held 750 was closed for work to split it into multiple screens.

== Premières ==
The cinema has hosted the Irish premières of many films, most of them having an Irish connection. Films shown here have included Alexander, Once and The Man in the Iron Mask. The cinema was used until 2017 during the Dublin International Film Festival, primarily for big-event screenings such as opening and closing night premiers. It also hosts the surprise film, which in 2006 was the first Irish screening of the film, 300.

== Controversy ==
In December 1934, Republicans demonstrated against the screening at the cinema of a newsreel of the marriage of Prince George, Duke of Kent, to Princess Marina.
