= List of shopping malls in the Czech Republic =

Shopping malls in the Czech Republic are listed in this article.

Name	Location	Opened	Note
Avion Shopping Park Brno	Brno	1998	
Olympia Brno	Brno	1999	
Obchodní centrum Futurum Brno	Brno	2001	
Velký Špalíček	Brno	2001	
Nákupní centrum Královo Pole	Brno	2004	
Galerie Vaňkovka	Brno	2005	
Obchodní centrum Letmo	Brno	2013	
OC Futurum Hradec Králové	Hradec Králové	2000	
Fontana Tesco	Karlovy Vary	2003	
Galerie Liberec Plaza	Liberec	2008	
Nisa Centrum	Liberec	2008	
Bondy centrum	Mladá Boleslav	2007	
Olympia Mladá Boleslav	Mladá Boleslav	2001	
Olympia Olomouc	Olomouc	2004	
Olomouc City	Olomouc	2003	
Futurum Ostrava	Ostrava	2000	
Avion Shopping Park Ostrava	Ostrava	2001	
Forum Nová Karolina	Ostrava	2012	
Outlet Arena Moravia	Ostrava	2018	
Pilsen Plaza	Plzeň	2007	
Olympia Plzeň	Plzeň	2004	
Centrum Borská Pole	Plzeň	1999	
Bílá labuť	Prague	1939	
Kotva Department Store	Prague	1975	
Westfield Černý Most	Prague	1997	
Obchodní centrum Letňany	Prague	1999	
Nový Smíchov	Prague	2001	
Obchodní centrum Europark Praha	Prague	2002	
Metropole Zlicin	Prague	2002	
Atrium Flora	Prague	2002	
Galerie Butovice	Prague	2005	
Nákupní centrum Eden	Prague	2005	
Westfield Chodov	Prague	2005	
Šestka	Prague	2006	
Palladium	Prague	2007	
Arkády Pankrác	Prague	2008	
Nákupní centrum Fénix	Prague	2008	
Galerie Harfa	Prague	2010	
Quadrio	Prague	2014	
