= Arkády Pankrác =

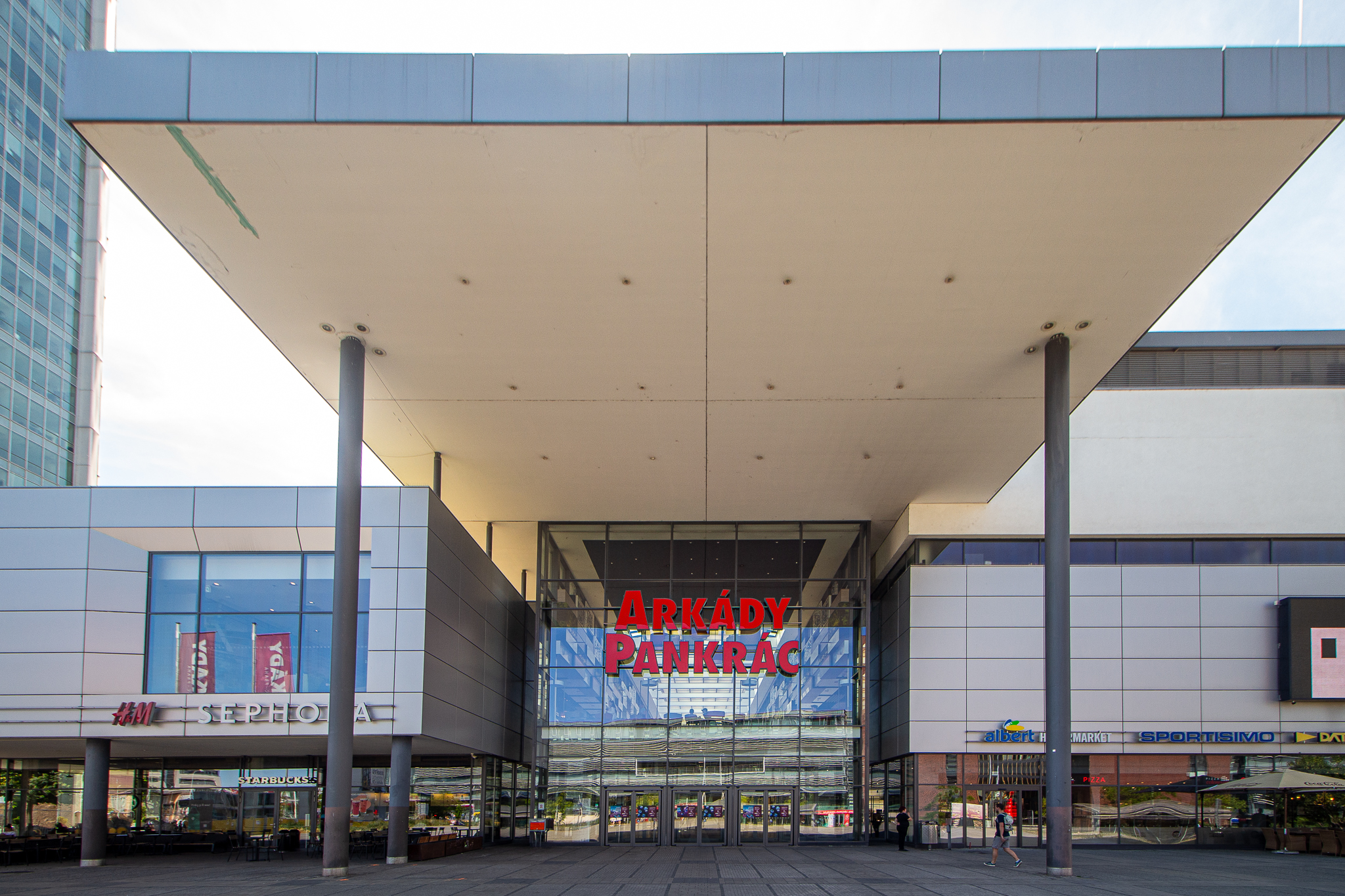
- Location: Na Pankráci 1727/86, Prague, Czech Republic, 140 00
- Coordinates: 50°3′3.46″N 14°26′14.61″E
- Opened: 14 November 2008
- Num. of stores: 140
- Floor area: 45,000 square metres (484,000 sq ft)
- Website: www.arkady-pankrac.cz

Arkády Pankrác is a shopping mall located in the Nusle district of Prague, Czech Republic. It has around 140 shops and an area of 45,000 square metres (484,000 sq ft).

== History ==
Arkády Pankrác opened on 14 November 2008 under the ownership of Unibail-Rodamco and at a cost of around 3 billion Czech koruna. Two thousand jobs were created within the shopping centre. In 2015 the firm Atrium European Real Estate bought a 75% share of the shopping centre for 162 million Euros.

== Tenants ==
Arkády Pankrác opened with a range of fashion brands including Peek & Cloppenburg, H&M, New Yorker, Zara, Stradivarius, and Bershka. There is a food court on the top floor of the shopping centre and an Albert hypermarket on the basement level.

== Events ==
Arkády Pankrác has hosted Downmall, an untraditional mountain bike race event within the shopping centre. In 2009 the centre held an exhibition of Formula One cars. A year later, the venue hosted an international competition called Iron Fireman, where 80 participants undertook various physical challenges. In 2018, the Gravity dance festival, headlined by American act Ephwurd, was held in the same place.

== Transport ==
The centre is directly connected to the Pankrác metro station on Prague Metro's Line C. It is also served by local bus services. The tram stop Pankrác opened in 2020 to connect the centre with the Prague tram network as well. With the construction of Line D of Prague Metro, Arkády Pankrác is due to become the first shopping centre directly connected to two metro lines.

== See also ==
- List of shopping malls in the Czech Republic
