= Cuvillier =

Cuvillier is a surname of French origin.

== Persons ==
Notable people with the surname include:

- Alexandre Cuvillier (born 1986), French footballer.
- Alfred-Auguste Cuvillier-Fleury (1802–1887), French historian and literary critic.
- Armand Cuvillier (1887–1973), French intellectual.
- Austin Cuvillier (1779–1849), Canadian businessman and politician.
- Charles Cuvillier (1877–1955), French operetta composer.
- Christophe Cuvillier (born 1962), French businessman, CEO of Unibail-Rodamco.
- Elian Cuvillier (born 1960), exegete and theologian Protestant French.
- Frédéric Cuvillier (born 1968), French politician.
- Jacques Philippe Cuvillier (1774–1857), admiral and French colonial governor.
- Louis A. Cuvillier (1871–1935), New York politician.
- Maurice Cuvillier (1897–1956), French comic book author.
- Philippe Cuvillier (1930–2015), French diplomat, ambassador of France.
- Roger Cuvillier (1922–2019), French engineer.

== Toponyms ==
- Cuvillier River, a river in Québec, Canada
