= Palladium (Prague) =

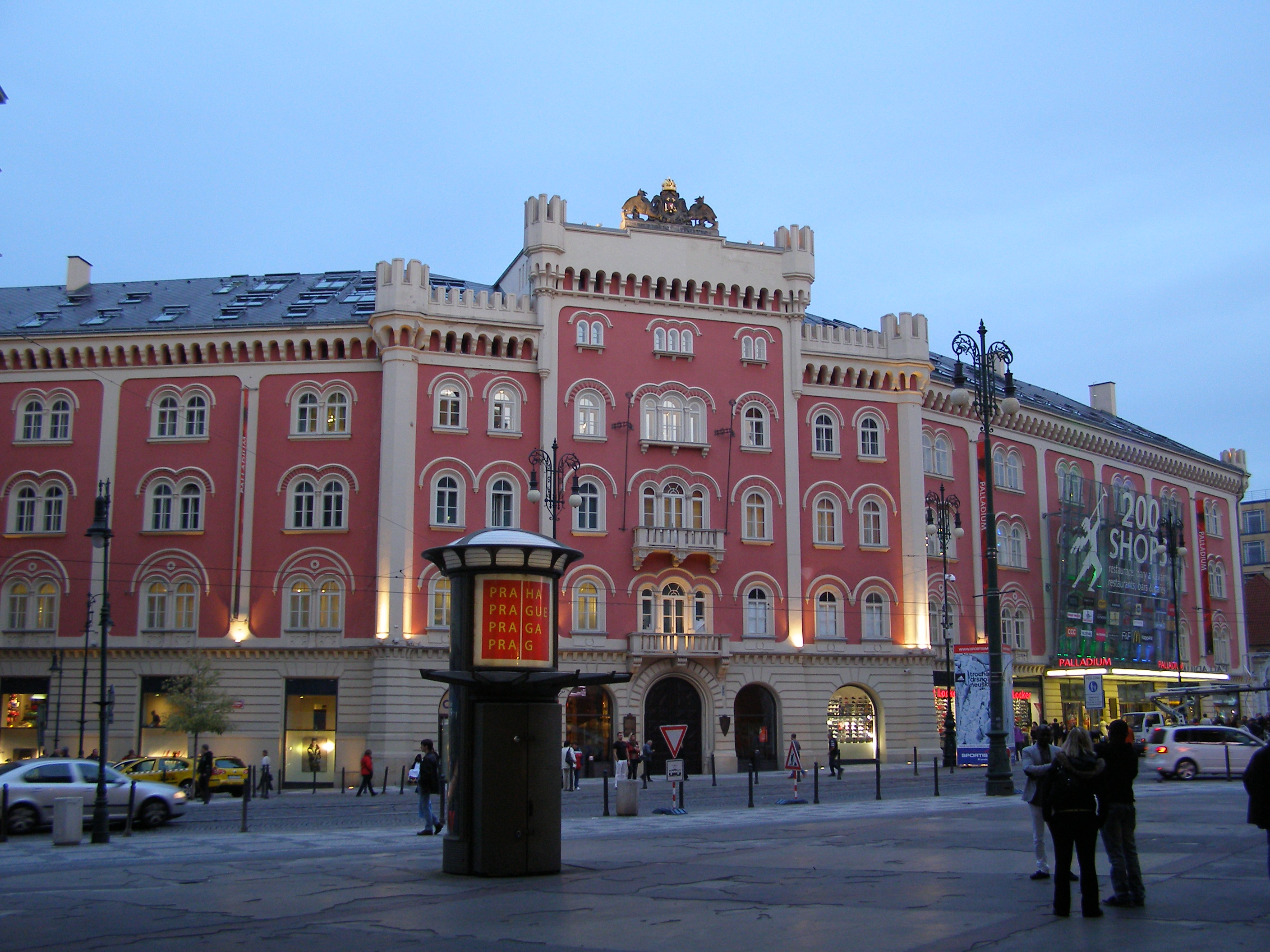
- Location: Náměstí Republiky, Prague
- Coordinates: 50°5′21.17″N 14°25′45.86″E
- Opened: October 2007
- Floor area: 39,000 square metres (420,000 sq ft)
- Floors: 11 (5 retail)
- Parking: 900 spaces
- Website: www.palladiumpraha.cz/en/

Palladium is a shopping mall located in the centre of Prague in the Czech Republic. It opened in 2007. The mall contains 170 shops and 30 restaurants, with a retail area of 39,000 square metres (420,000 sq ft). There is also designated office space in the building totalling 19,500 square metres (210,000 sq ft). It is one of the biggest shopping centres in the Czech Republic. It is directly opposite another shopping centre, Kotva Department Store.

== History ==
The site where Palladium stands was under control of the Army until being sold in the 1990s. Construction on Palladium was announced in June 2005, with a projected completion date of autumn 2007. The new design has retained the facade of the previous Josef Barracks building. During the construction process, a number of medieval ruins were found underneath the construction site in an archaeological excavation. The remains were removed but not before they were recorded and photographed.

The mall was opened by television personality Leoš Mareš in October 2007, becoming one of the biggest shopping centres in the Czech Republic. The mall closed for three days in February 2008 following a fire. Another fire, in August 2011, caused the evacuation of two floors of the mall, but it was smaller than the 2008 fire. Palladium was the only shopping mall in Prague to be open on Christmas Day 2007, and New Year's Day 2008.

Palladium Praha, the company which operates the centre, announced losses of over 700 million CZK in 2008. The following year, losses were over 2 billion CZK. In 2010 however, the company recorded a profit of 155 million CZK.

== Security workers torturing people controversy ==
In September 2025, Police of the Czech Republic published an appeal to the public to help them identify multiple victims, whose faces were severaly injured in the published stills from video recordings. The case was opened when a young foreign national got into a verbal dispute with workers in the food court. Palladium's security workers then dragged the man into the generally unaccassible evacuation staircase, pepper sprayed him, stripped him, severely whipped his back with his own belt and then robbed him before throwing him out onto the street. The perpetrators recorded the whole torture on their mobile phones. The victim reported the attack. Police investigation led to confiscation of a mobile phone of one of the security workers, uncovering multiple older videos of people being brutally assaulted by the Palladium's security within the fire evacuation staircase. The victims, some of whom were probably homeless, were brutally kicked, beaten by fists as well as by collapsible batons. Some of the videos showed victims also being cut and stabbed by knives and scissors. Other videos showed the security members knocking out the victim's teeth with a collapsible baton, or forcing another victim to masturbate. A member of Palladium's security can be heard saying while torturing his victim: "See, another tooth fell out, you will have to clean this up."

In December 2025, the three men, two Palladium security workers and one security workers' friend, were indicted of crimes of causing bodily harm, robbery and criminal threats. Moreover, one of the three was also indicted of crime of expressions of sympathy for the Nazi movement. If convicted, the Palladium security workers may face up to ten years imprisonment. One of the alleged attackers is a Prague 15 vice-mayor's 19 year old son, who holds a title of a former deadlift teen champion in under 95kg category. During investigation, it became known that Palladium cleaning workers had repeatedly unsuccessfully complained about having to clean up blood left by security workers' "interventions", but to no avail.

== Tenants ==
Palladium contains 200 tenants, including 170 shops and 30 restaurants. Tenants at Palladium include Marks & Spencer, H&M, Albert, Esprit, Marc O'Polo, Starbucks, Pizza Hut and Topshop.

== Transport ==
Palladium houses parking for 900 vehicles. The building is directly connected to the western exit of the Náměstí Republiky metro station on Prague Metro's Line B. The mall is also served by the tram stop Náměstí Republiky for overground public transport.

== See also ==
- List of shopping malls in the Czech Republic
