= AAII =

AAII may refer to:

- Air Accidents Investigation Institute, a government agency in the Czech Republic
- American Association of Individual Investors, a non-profit organisation for private investors
- Australian Artificial Intelligence Institute, a defunct Australian company, in existence between 1988 and 1999
- Australian Artificial Intelligence Institute (UTS), a research institute at the University of Technology Sydney
- AutoAnalyzer II, a commercially-produced automated analyzer created by Technicon in 1970
