= Czech Ice Hockey Hall of Fame =

Coordinates: 50°6′17″N 14°29′31″E

The Czech Ice Hockey Hall of Fame (Czech: Síň slávy českého hokeje) was founded in 2008 and is located in Prague, Czech Republic. The Hall honors individuals that have contributed to the sport of ice hockey in the Czech Republic. It houses displays and a collection of memorabilia depicting the significant contributions of players, coaches, referees and other important figures in the sport. The physical hall of fame was located in Galerie Harfa from 2015 until 2023. In 2024 a physical location opened in New Town's Nekázanka street.

== National Hockey League 100th birthday celebration ==
In 2018, The National Hockey League (NHL) celebrated their 100th birthday. The National Hockey League had been featured by The Czech Hockey Hall of Fame, with the National Hockey League celebrating its 100th birthday.

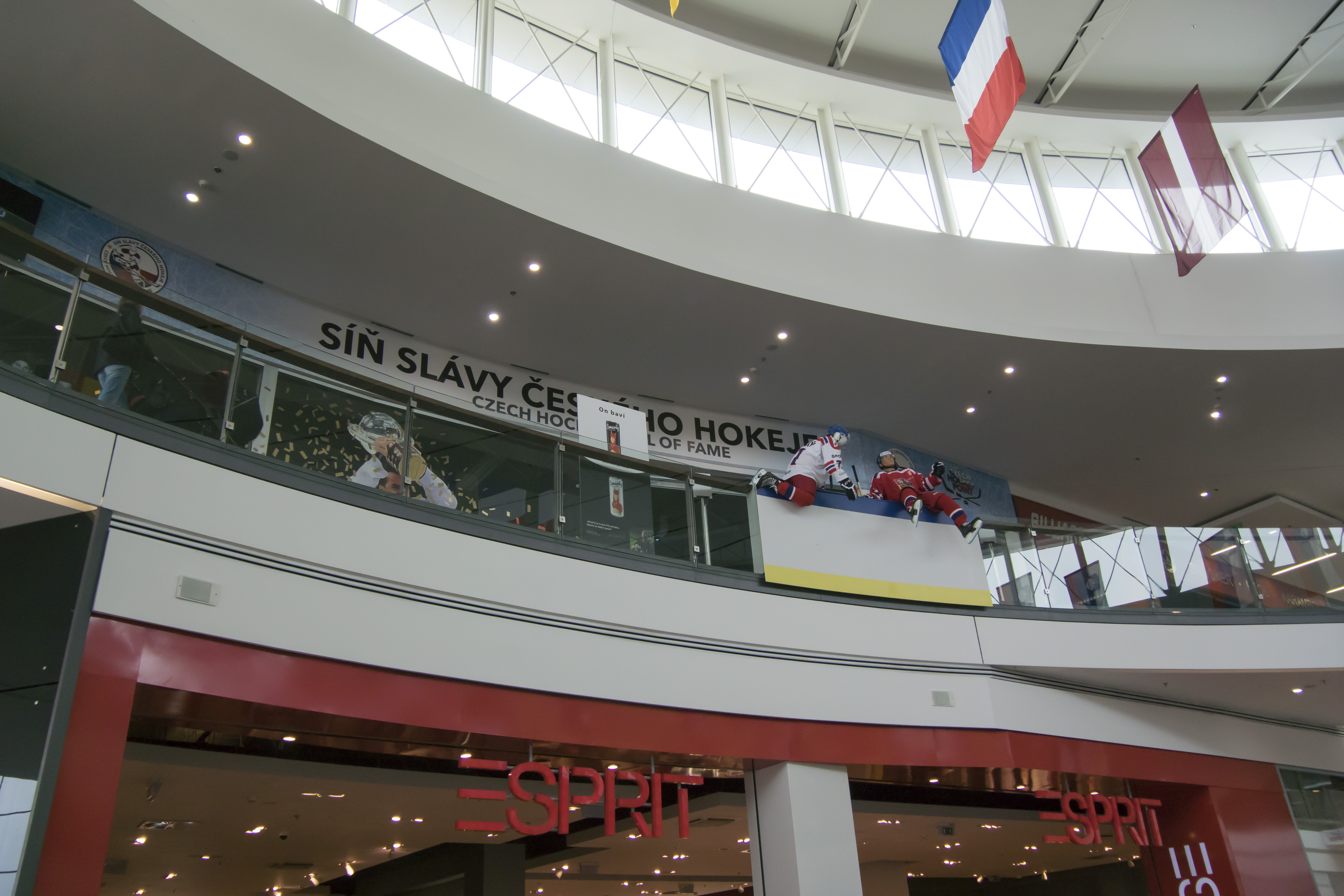
Former premises in Galerie Harfa

== See also ==
- IIHF Hall of Fame
