= Cinema City Czech Republic =

Brand of multiplex cinemas in Europe

Cinema City Czech s.r.o
- Type: Corp.
- Industry: Cinemas
- Headquarters: Prague, Czech Republic
- Website: www.cinemacity.cz

Cinema City is a brand of multiplex cinemas in eastern and central Europe, run by the Israeli company Cinema City International (CCI). In Europe it has cinemas in Bulgaria, Czech Republic, Hungary, Poland, Romania, and Slovakia. CCI also runs a chain of Israeli multiplexes under the name of Rav-Hen.

On 19 January 2011, as a part of a bigger European deal, Cinema City acquired 8 multiplexes (4 of them in Prague) from Palace Cinemas with 65 screens.

== Current multiplex locations ==
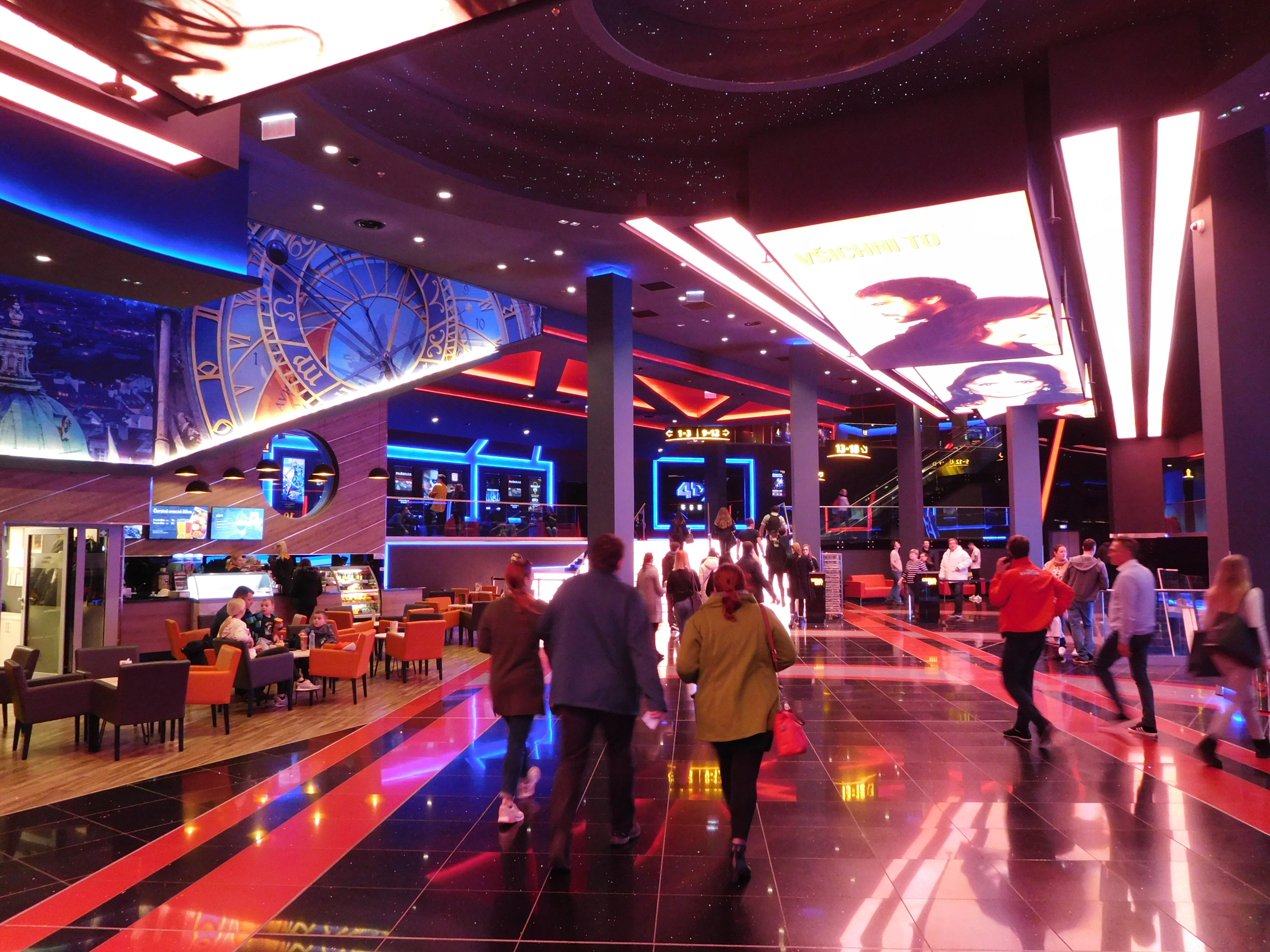
Cinema City Megaplex in Westfield Chodov, Prague

Active cinemas:

- Brno
  - Olympia - 10 screens, opened October 1999
  - Velký Špalíček - 1413 seats, 7 screens, opened August 2001
- Prague
  - Slovanský dům - 10 screens, opened 2000
  - Nový Smíchov - 11 screens + 4DX, opened November 2001
  - Obchodní centrum Letňany - 12 screens, opened October 2002
  - Metropole Zličin - 1841 seats, 10 screens, opened December 2002
  - Palac Flora - 2150 seats, 8 screens + IMAX, One of the three 70mm IMAX in mainland Europe, opened March 2003
  - Westfield Chodov - 18 screens - 1 4DX - 3 VIP, opened October 2017
- Other
  - Pilsen Plaza/Plzeň Plaza (Plzeň) - 1720 seats, 10 screens + 4DX, opened 2008
  - AFI Palace (Pardubice) - 988 seats, 8 screens, opened January 2009
  - Forum Liberec (Liberec) - 5 screens, opened September 2010
  - OC Forum (Ústí nad Labem) - opened 2010
  - Forum Nová Karolina (Ostrava) - 8 screens

Former cinemas:

- Novodvorská Plaza (Prague) - 848 seats, 5 screens, opened March 2006 and ceased operation in December 2008 due to low visit rate
- Galaxie (Prague) - 1728 seats, 9 screens, opened April 1996 as the first multiplex cinema in the Czech Republic and ceased operation in September 2019.

== Current IMAX locations ==
Outside Poland CCI runs one IMAX cinema in Prague, alongside Flora multiplex.

== Corporate governance ==
The board of directors has three members:

- Mooky Greidinger (CEO)
- Amos Weltsch (COO)
- Israel Greidinger (CFO)

== See also ==
- Cinema City Hungary
- Cinema City Poland
- Rav-Hen
