= AGF (company) =

French insurance company

Assurances Générales de France
- Company type: Subsidiary
- Industry: Insurance
- Founded: 1818; 208 years ago
- Headquarters: Paris, France
- Area served: France and 20+ other countries (2007)
- Key people: Jacques Richier (CEO)
- Products: Life insurance; Insurance; Investment management
- Revenue: €17,300,000,000 (2004)
- Net income: ▲US$2,000,000,000 (2005); ▲US$1,500,000,000 (2004)
- Number of employees: 30,585 (2007)
- Parent: Allianz
- Website: www.allianz.fr
- Footnotes / references Net income data

Allianz France is a French insurance company, headquartered in Rue de Richelieu, Paris.

Assurances Générales de France (the company only refers to itself as AGF) is a majority-owned subsidiary of the German multinational Allianz SE. The company provides insurance and financial services in France and internationally.

== History ==
In 1990, AGF was 72% state owned by the French government. Thus, AGF was among those companies owned in large part by the government in 1993 when passage of a French "denationalization law" took place. AGF was privatized as part of the law's implementation in 1996, though the French government retained a 57% ownership stake. This level of ownership is consistent with the company remaining a part of French economic infrastructure in a crossed share holding set of relationships with Société Générale and Alcatel-Alsthom. A second such "pole" at the time (1996) consisted of Banque Nationale de Paris, Union des Assurances de Paris and Suez.

The year after privatization, in 1997, AGF was purchased by Allianz of Germany, part of a period of acquisitions for Allianz from 1992 to 1999 during which it purchased 11 companies.

As of 2007, AGF was traded on the Euronext stock exchange under the symbol "AGF" and represented in the United States under the symbol "ASGFF".

== Operations ==
As of 2007, AGF employed 30,585 personnel. Also as of 2007, the company derived 62% of its revenue from activities in France.

== Corporate governance ==
As of 2007, Jean-Philippe Thierry held the posts of chief executive officer and chairman of the board, Patrick Dixneuf was both chief operating officer and chief financial officer, and Francois Thomazeau was the chief investment officer.

== AGF Subsidiaries ==
- Euler Hermes
- AGF Private Bank, serving the companies "wealthiest clients"
- AGF France, formed in 2006, contains all French activities outside of Euler Hermes and Mondial Assistance
- Mondial Assistance
