= Forum Nová Karolina =

Shopping centre in Ostrava, Czech Republic

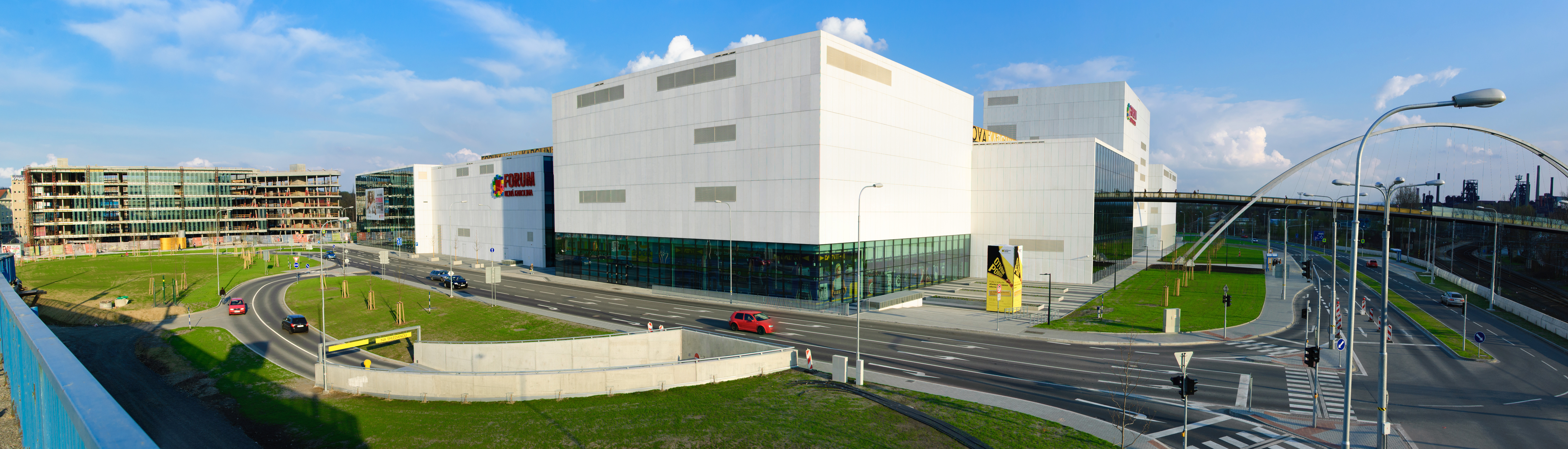
General view

Albert Hypermarket on the lowest floor of the centre

Forum Nová Karolina is a shopping centre in Ostrava, Czech Republic. Construction of the centre began in 2008 and was completed in 2012, when the centre opened. The centre covers an area of approximately 58,000 m^{2} (620,000 sq ft) and features around 220 stores, a Cinema City multiplex, and a food court with over 20 restaurants and fast-food outlets.

The shopping centre was developed by the Dutch real estate company Multi Development for a cost of approximately CZK 4 billion (€160 million). In 2011, Multi Development sold the centre, together with Forum Ústí nad Labem, to a joint venture between Meyer Bergman and the Canadian pension fund Healthcare of Ontario Pension Plan (HOOPP) for approximately CZK 7.35 billion (€300 million). In 2018, the shopping centre was sold for CZK 5.4 billion (approximately €208 million) to REICO, an investment company within the Erste Group.
