= Westfield Chodov =

Shopping mall in Prague, Czechia

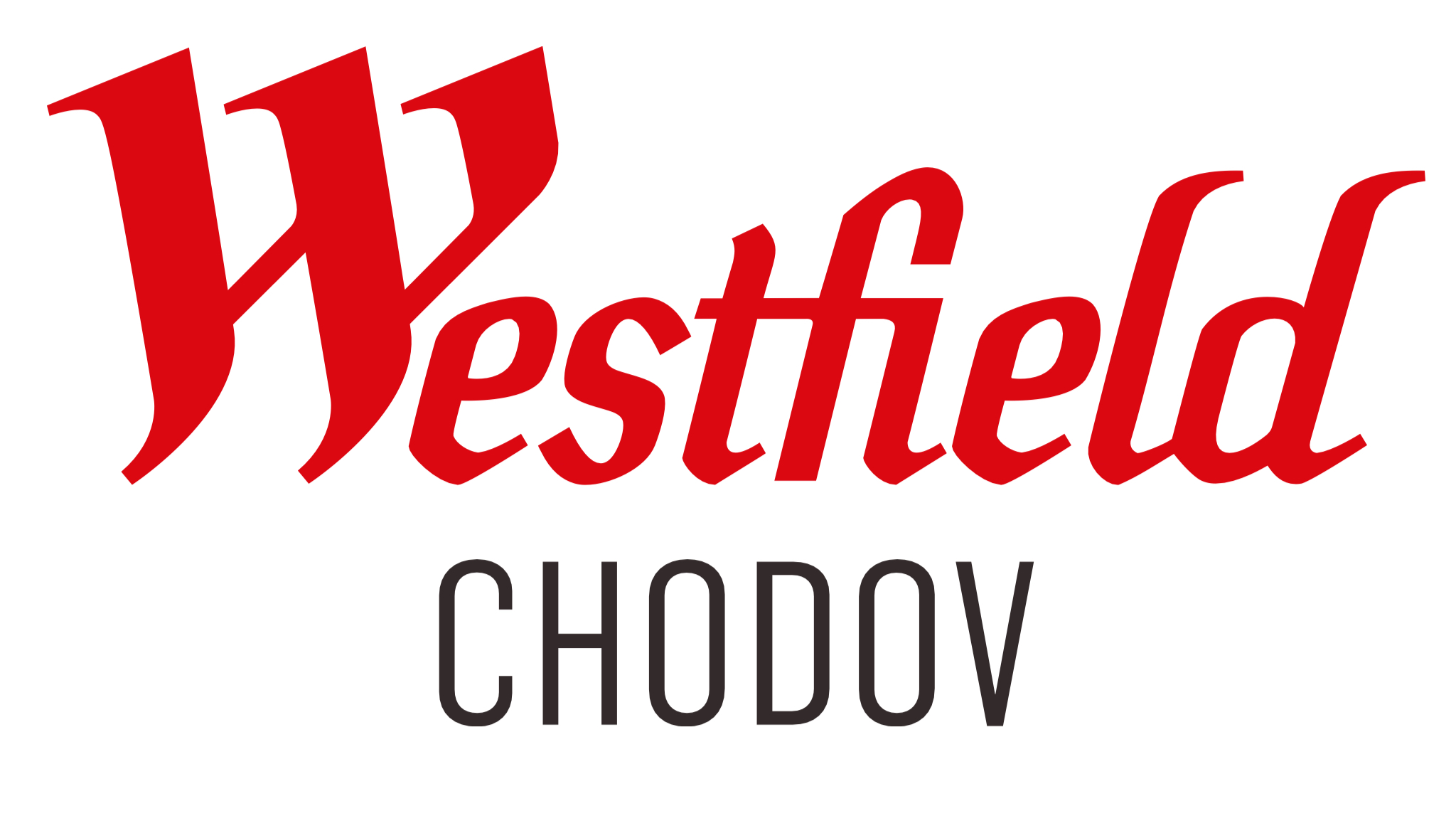

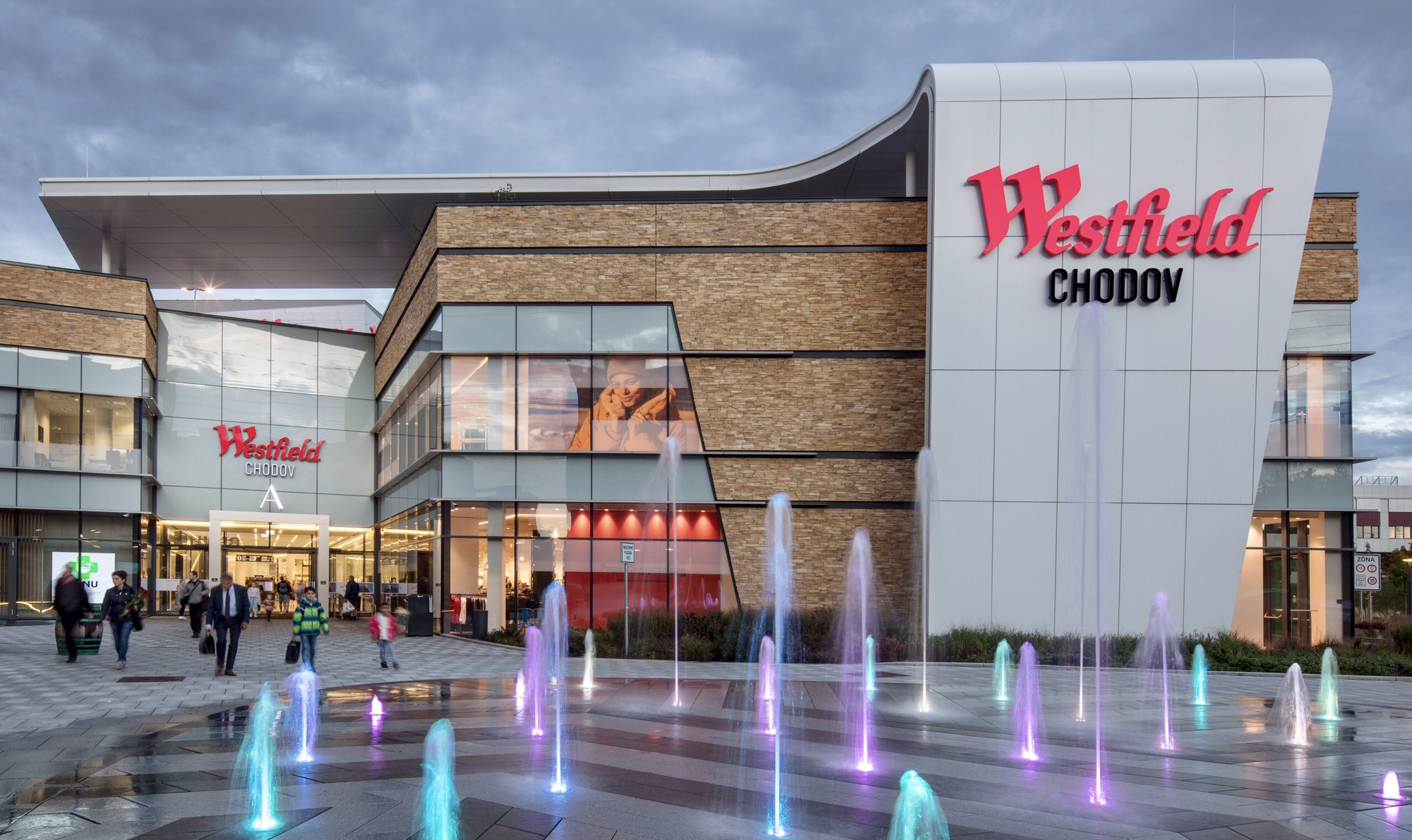
- Exterior view (September 2021)
- Coordinates: 50.0306°N 14.4906°E
- Address: Roztylská 2321/19, Chodov, Prague, Czech Republic, 148 00
- Opened: 9. November 2005
- Owner: Unibail-Rodamco-Westfield
- Num. of stores: 300
- Floor area: 100,000 m^{2}
- Floors: 4 (6 with parking floors)
- Parking: 2,014 spaces plus 653 park and ride
- Public transit: Chodov, Line C, Prague Metro
- Website: www.westfield.com/czech-republic/chodov

Westfield Chodov, previously known as Centrum Chodov, is a shopping center in the Chodov district of Prague, Czech Republic. It is located near the metro station of the same name, between the streets U Kunratického lesa, Roztylská and the D1 motorway towards Brno. Westfield Chodov is the largest shopping center in the Czech Republic with 300 shops, and the retail floor area is 100.000 m^{2}, the second largest in the country behind shopping centre Letňany. The owner of Westfield Chodov is the company Unibail-Rodamco-Westfield. It was built in 2005, with a major expansion occurred in 2017. It receives 13 million customers annually, employing approximately 8,000 people.

There is free WiFi throughout Westfield Chodov. It houses fashion shops, a Cinema City multiplex cinema, perfume and makeup boutiques, fast-food restaurants, cafes, restaurants, flower shops, bookstores, jewellery boutiques, electronic shops, sporting goods, dry cleaners, and shoe repair services. There are also banks, travel agencies, mobile phone operators, children's corners, and hairdressers.

== History ==
=== Plans ===
Until the 1950s the site was a field known as Chodov field. After Chodov became part of Prague in 1968, construction began in the area. On 12 July 1971 the D1 motorway was completed and on 7 November 1980 the Budovatelů metro station (today Chodov) was opened, and a new bus terminal was built there. Construction of the adjoining settlement of Jižní Město II began in 1979.

The first plans for the construction of this large area included building up to fifteen-story hotels. At the end of the 1980s, construction of the Růže shopping center began. It was completed in 1991 after the Velvet Revolution, but demolished in 2015. Around the same time, the Devětsil cultural house on Roztylská Street began to be built, but due to changes to the original socialist concept and a lack of finance, the construction was soon stopped, with only a part of the foundation built. Until 2004, the site currently occupied by Westfield Chodov was an undeveloped area aside from these unfinished constructions.

=== Construction ===
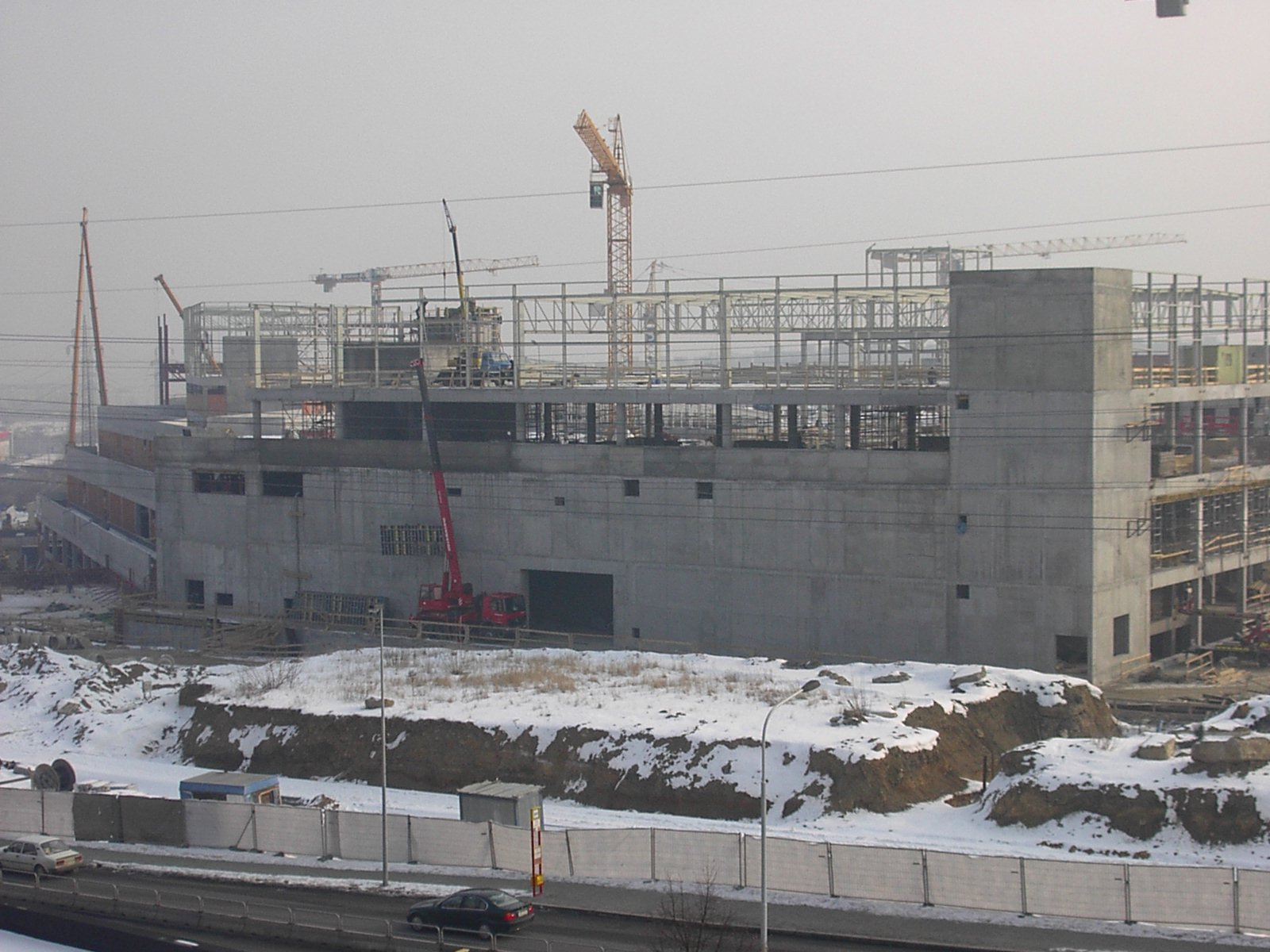
Construction of Westfield Chodov in 2005

Construction of the center began in May 2004, despite protests from some local citizens. The construction ran according to schedule, but aggravated the surrounding environment with increased noise, dirt, and dust, with work often continuing overnight. Another problem was the re-routing of pedestrian walkways in the vicinity, which extended the journeys of residents to the metro and for shopping. The project also included a total reconstruction of parts of U Kunratického lesa, Roztylská, Pod Chodov and Brněnská (D1 motorway), which mostly meant repair of road surfaces and preparation of branches for planned parking space. A new downhill ramp from the D1 motorway was also built, at the junction with Pod Chodov street.

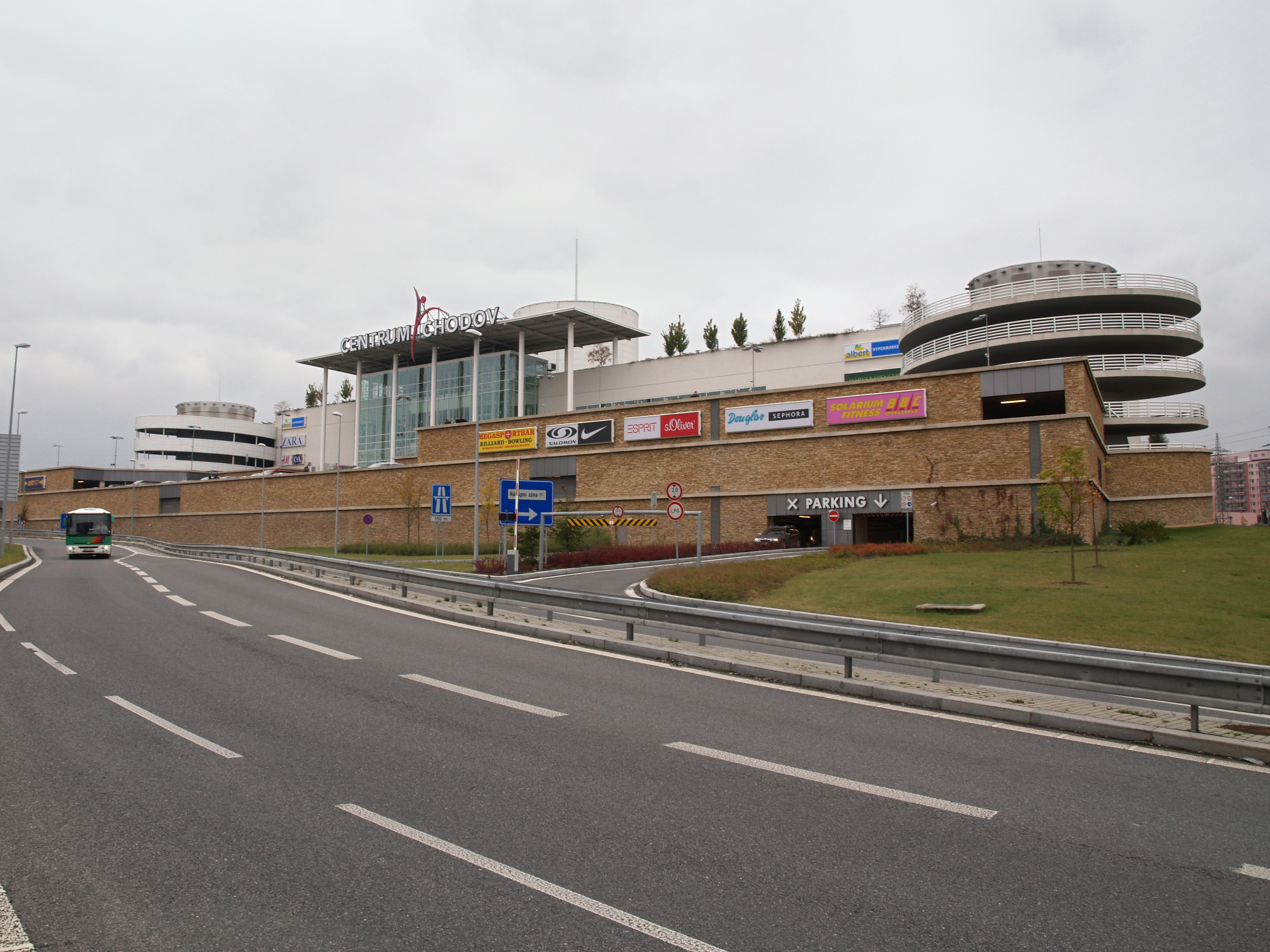
Westfield Chodov viewed from D1 motorway

The overground sections of Chodov metro station were completely rebuilt. The old shelters and backgrounds from the 1980s were gradually dismantled and replaced with new exits, which were integrated with the main pavements being redesigned as part of the construction of the shopping center. The bridge over the D1 motorway was also completely rebuilt.

The complex was designed by the German architectural studio Obermeyer Helika. The total area was 55 500m^{2}, and the construction lasted 19 months. The primary investor for the project was the French company Unibail-Rodamco, the developer of AM Development; about four billion crowns were invested in the construction. Several companies, including Skanska and APB Plzeň, participated in their own construction.

The opening ceremony took place on 9 November 2005, attended by Pavel Bém, the Mayor of Prague, and Marta Šorfová, the Mayor of Prague 11. Large numbers of shoppers went to the center from early in the morning to buy goods in the various promotional offers.

=== Extension ===
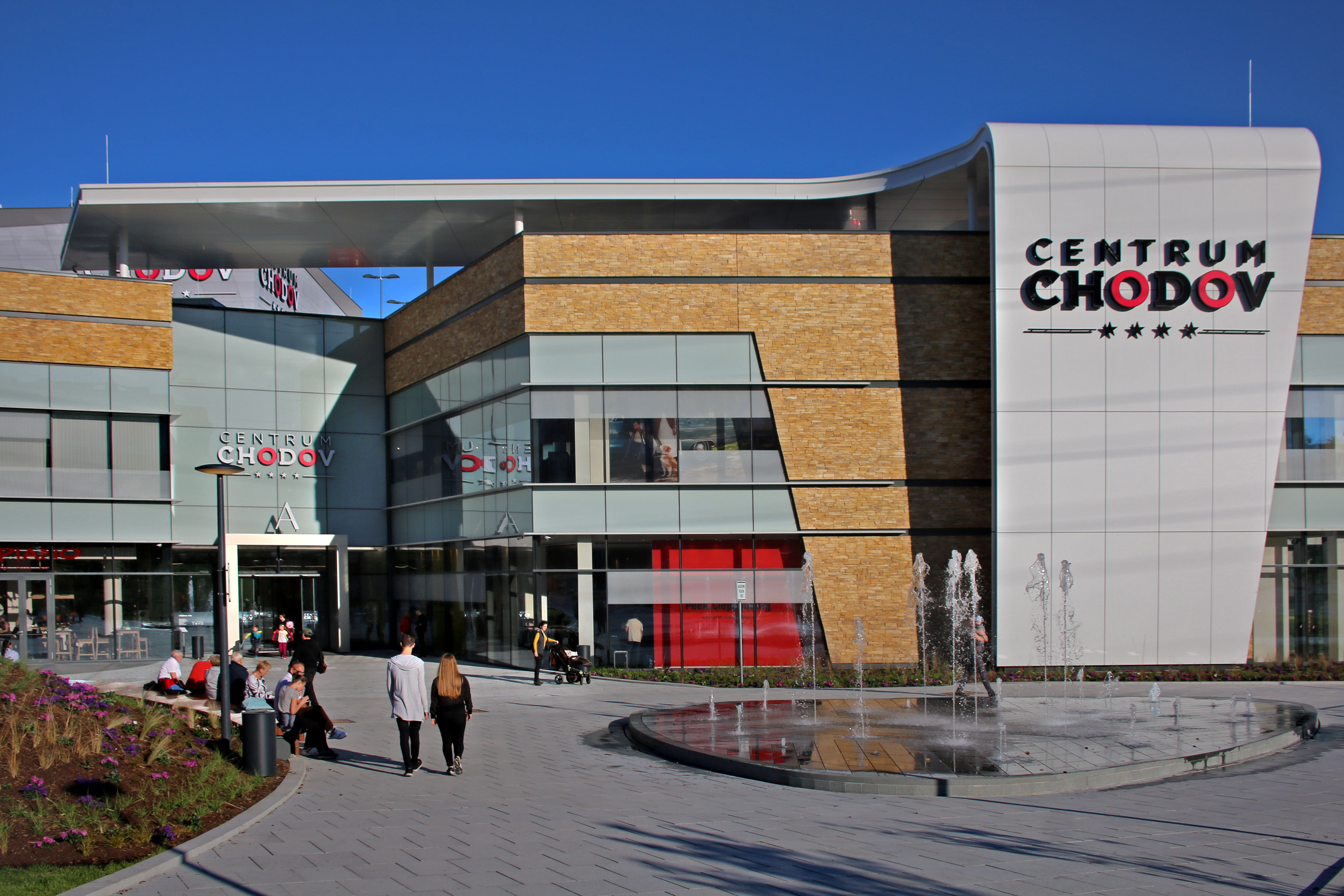
Part of Westfield Chodov built between 2015 and 2017

In the second half of 2014, new office space was built, which subsequently housed Unibail-Rodamco's Czech Republic headquarters. Several retail outlets were also created.

Further expansion of the complex took place between 2015 and 2017. First, at the beginning of 2015, the old shopping center Růže and the temporary parking lot of the Chodov Center were demolished, to make way for expansion. In 2016, the construction of a new part of the complex started, while the existing premises were renovated. The developer Unibail-Rodamco invested 4.4 billion crowns into the project, making it one of the largest retail project investments in the Czech Republic.

A new section opened on 11 October 2017, expanding the complex by about one-third. Over 40,000 m^{2} of commercial space was added to the existing 58,600 m^{2}, giving the center a total area of 102.266 m^{2}. The expansion includes a new food court, called "Grand Kitchen", and the largest branch of the Cinema City chain, with 18 screens and a total area of 5,783 m^{2}, including a VIP screening room and 4DX cinema. The expansion also includes a sauna world, relaxation zones, children's corners and "The Designer Gallery" presenting Czech and foreign design brands. The renovated building is more colourful and has more complex architectural elements. At the time of opening, all retail units were leased.

In 2017 Westfield Chodov won the "Best of Realty" competition in the category of shopping malls in the Czech Republic.

=== Rebranding ===
The shopping center was officially known as Centrum Chodov (sometimes referred to as OC Chodov) until September 26, 2019, when the center has been rebranded as Westfield Chodov to match the global brand of flagship shopping centers of Unibail-Rodamco-Westfield, joining numerous centers in France, UK, Poland, Sweden and the USA.

== Design ==
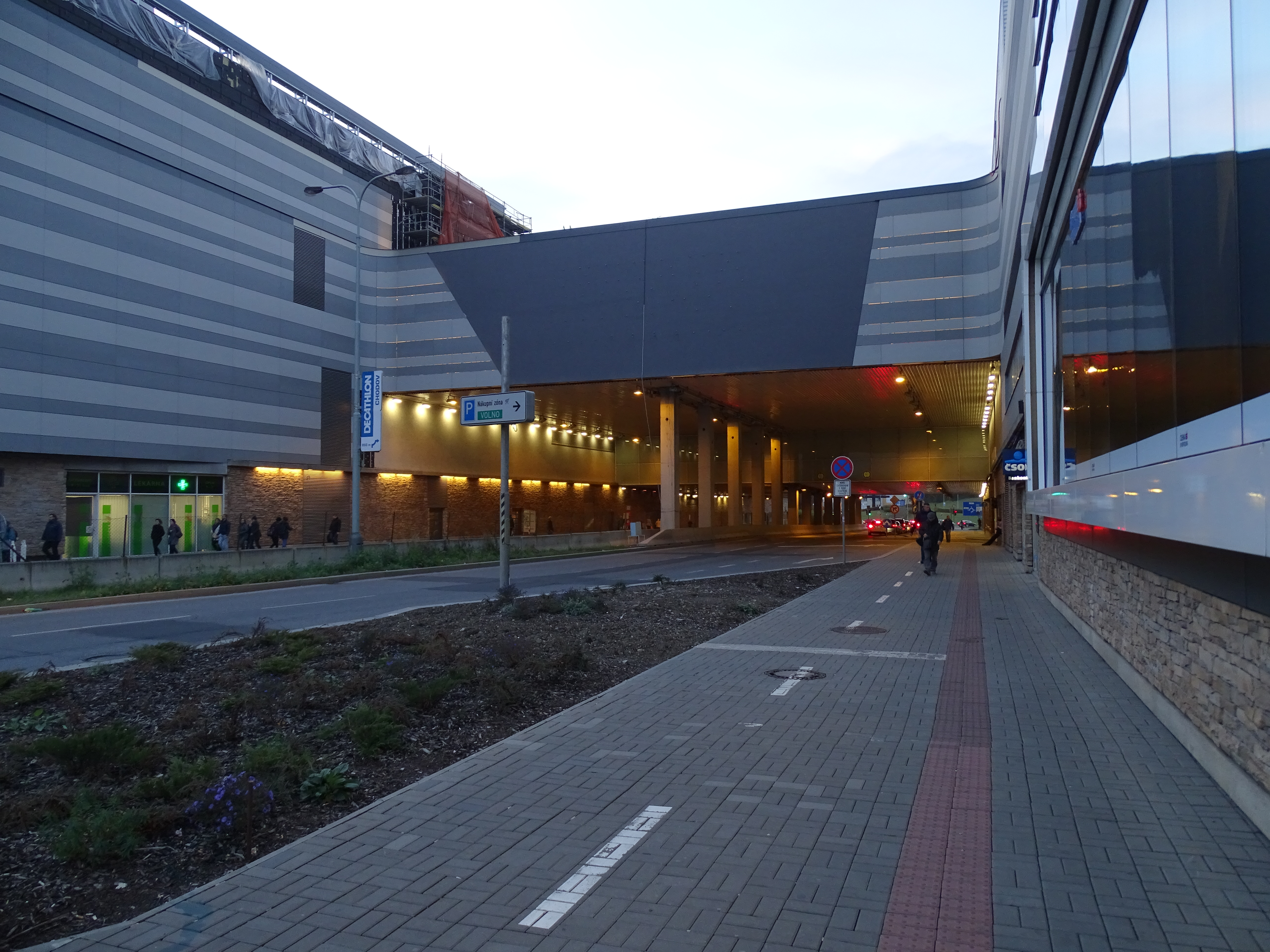
Four-lane road leading under the Westfield Chodov, with two sidewalks and cycle path

The reconstructed center completed in 2017 resembled two large concrete blocks without windows, with a large gate for cars (underpass Roztylská street). In 2017, the center was extended to the west. In total, the building has seven floors (marked -4 to 2), of which shops occupy floors -2, 0 and 1. Floors -4, -3, -2 and -1 serve as an underground car park and 2 floors are reserved for the car park of the park and ride system connecting to metro C at Chodov, one of the largest in Prague with a capacity of over 600 cars. On the roof (floor 2) there is a fitness center, a café, office space, engine rooms and more parking spaces. Various types of marble and decorative stone are often used in the interior of the business section.

Floors 0 and 1 are divided into pedestrian "streets" that connect similar "squares". The southern section of the center features a "turret", which extends into three floors and darkens in the dark. In the second part of the center there is a monumental circular area, whose walls are plastered with a brick decoration. Long ropes planted with bulbs hang From the ceiling of this space.

Close to the hypermarket on floor -2 is a glass chandelier by artist Bořek Šípek, entitled Reversed Tree, from Skláren Nový Bor in the past.

== Shops ==
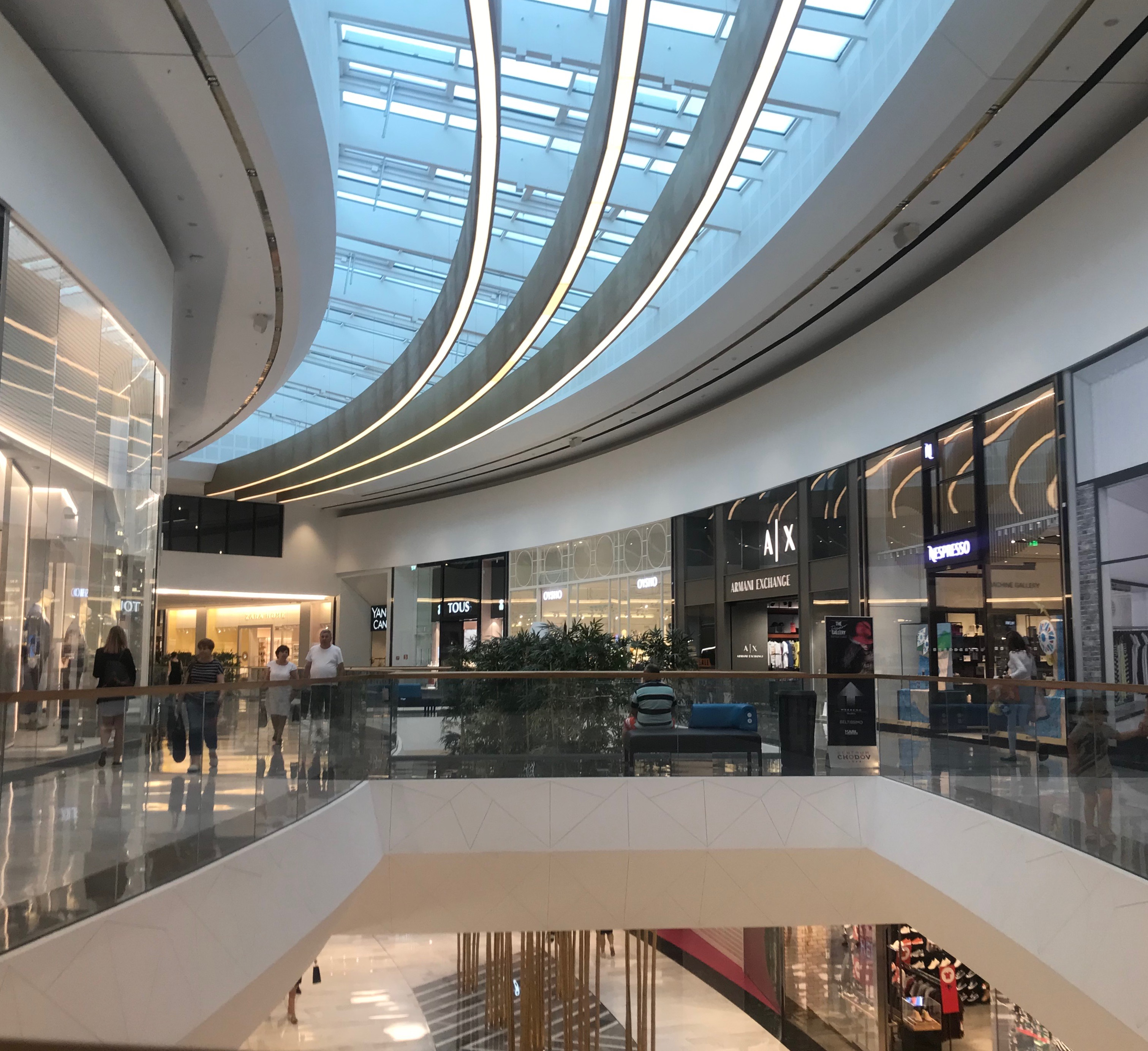
Interior of Westfield Chodov

There are 272 classical shops and 42 restaurants (2019), including fashion shops, perfume and makeup boutiques, flower shops, bookstores, jewellery boutiques, electronic shops, sporting goods, dry cleaners, and shoe repair services, as well as banks, travel agencies, mobile phone operators, hairdressers, and cafes.

The biggest sales area is Albert hypermarket in the center of the building (floor -2) with a sales area of 13,000 m^{2}. Retailers with branches in the shopping center include Tommy Hilfiger, H&M, Zara, Promod, Swarovski, Sephora, MAC, Crabtree & Evelyn, Nike, and Foot Locker.

Cafes and restaurants are situated throughout the center, with a dedicated fast food area in the first and second floor of the south-western part of the center. Before the reconstruction of 2017, this zone was located on the first floor of the northern part of the building overlooking the D1 and old Chodov.

== Traffic availability ==
Westfield Chodov is served by the Prague Metro C station Chodov. There is a large bus stop on Roztylská Street served by bus lines 115, 135, 154, 177 and 197, as of January 2017. It is next to the Czech D1 motorway leading to the center of Prague and Brno and Ostrava. Under the center there are three floors of underground car parks with 2,667 parking spaces (including park and ride). Bicycle parking spaces are also available – stands or paid boxes.
