= Galerie Harfa =

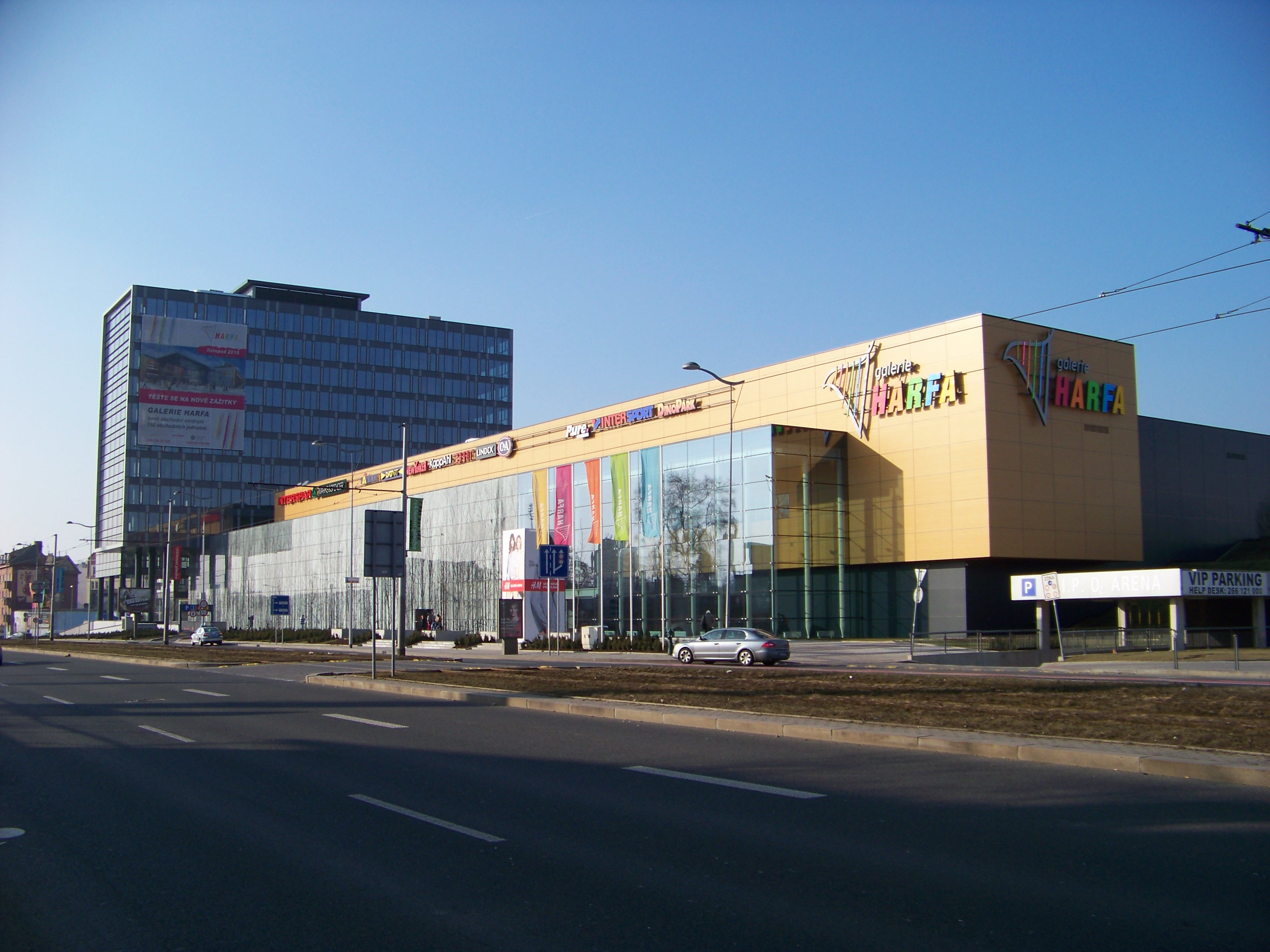
- Location: Českomoravská 2420/15a, Prague, Czech Republic, 190 00
- Coordinates: 50°6′15.48″N 14°29′27.24″E
- Opened: 11 November 2010
- Num. of stores: 160
- Floor area: 49,000 square metres (527,000 sq ft)
- Parking: 1,600 spaces
- Website: www.galerieharfa.cz

Galerie Harfa is a shopping mall located in the Libeň district of Prague, Czech Republic. It has around 160 shops and an area of 49,000 square metres (527,000 sq ft). The centre has a distinctive dinosaur-themed amusement park on the roof, which opened a year after the shopping centre itself.

== History ==
Galerie Harfa opened on 11 November 2010 as the only shopping centre to open in Prague that year. The following year a dinosaur-themed amusement park on the roof, DinoPark Praha, opened.

== Tenants ==
Galerie Harfa opened with an ice rink on its roof as well as various services including dry cleaning, hairdressing, and banking. There is also a food court with cafes and restaurants, as well as a gym.

The Czech Ice Hockey Hall of Fame was housed at Galerie Harfa for eight years until it closed in May 2023.

== Events ==
Harfa was home to an exhibition of Czech athletics history from December 2014 leading up to the 2015 European Athletics Indoor Championships, which were held in the adjacent O2 Arena. Harfa hosted a fanzone for the 2015 IIHF World Championship, which was held in Prague and Ostrava. In 2023 it co-hosted the Czech Republic Squash Championship. The centre has hosted an annual chocolate festival dating back to at least 2013.

== Transport ==
The centre is served by the Českomoravská metro station on Prague Metro's Line B, which also provides local bus services. Tram stops Divadlo Gong and Ocelářska are also close to Harfa. The Praha-Libeň railway station is a short distance from the shopping centre too.

== See also ==
- List of shopping malls in the Czech Republic
