= Nový Smíchov =

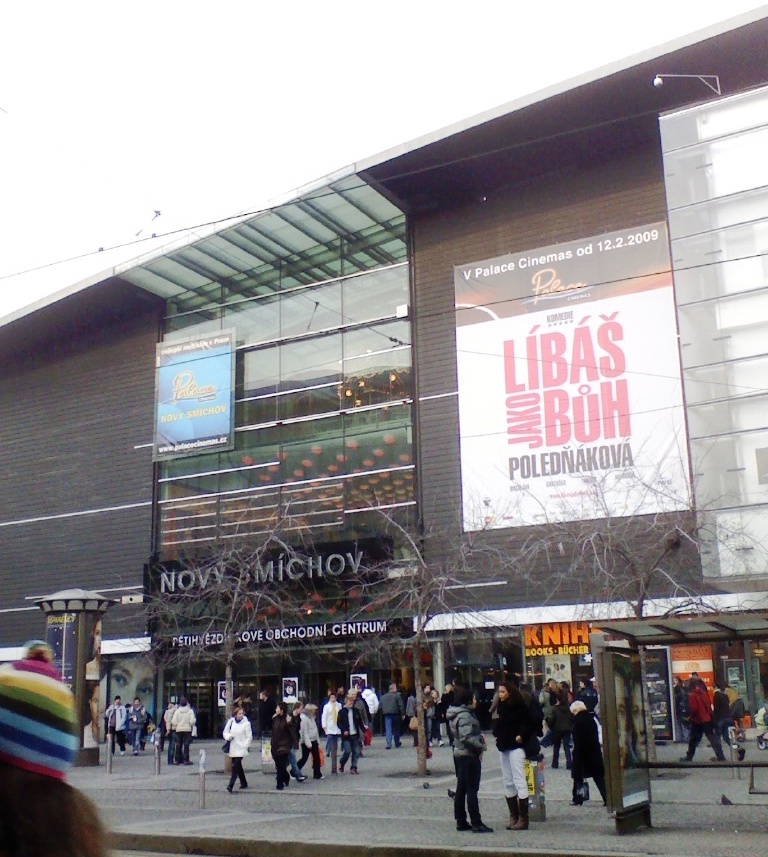
- Location: Plzeňská, Prague
- Coordinates: 50°4′22.45″N 14°24′7.4″E
- Opened: November 2001
- Floor area: 60,000 square metres (650,000 sq ft)
- Floors: 3
- Parking: 2,000 spaces
- Website: cz.club-onlyou.com/Novy-Smichov

Nový Smíchov is a shopping mall located west of the centre of Prague in the Czech Republic. It opened in 2001. The mall has a retail area of 60,000 square metres (650,000 sq ft). It is one of the biggest shopping centres in the Czech Republic.

== History ==
The centre was developed by French firm Delcis, in an area previously described as "bleak and unpromising." It opened in 2001, becoming the largest such building in central Europe. It was soon given recognition in The Construction Journal's first annual property awards. In 2006 there was a fire in the mall, specifically in the Vodafone store. Nový Smíchov underwent some redevelopment in 2011, with features such as relaxation zones being added.

== Tenants ==
Nový Smíchov opened with main tenants including Carrefour's flagship store. However Carrefour ceased operations in Prague in 2006 and the hypermarket was taken over by Tesco. Other tenants, spanning the three floors of the centre, include a multiplex cinema, currently branded as Cinema City. In addition to the big name tenants, the centre also features smaller, niche shops. There is a food court with restaurants offering various types of cuisine, with segregated seating.

== Events ==
Nový Smíchov has hosted numerous events including music performances, fashion shows and rock climbing. Additionally the centre hosted an exhibition of monochrome photographs by František Dostál in 2008.

== Transport ==
Nový Smíchov houses parking for 2,000 vehicles. The building is located close to the northern exit of the Anděl metro station on Prague Metro's Line B. The mall is also served by the tram stop Anděl for overground public transport.

== See also ==
- List of shopping malls in the Czech Republic
