= Plzeň Plaza =

- Plzeň Plaza before its grand opening on 5 December 2007
- Location: Plzeň, Czech Republic
- Coordinates: 49°44′58.14″N 13°22′10.17″E
- Opened: 5 December 2007
- Developer: Plaza Center
- Owner: Klépierre Plzeň, s.r.o.
- Floor area: 20,000 square metres (220,000 square feet)
- Website: plzen-plaza.klepierre.cz

Plzeň Plaza is a 20,000-square-metre (220,000-square-foot) shopping mall and entertainment centre in Plzeň, Czech Republic.

== History ==
The facility was built by Israeli mall developer Plaza Centers. It opened on 5 December 2007, on the former land of Ex Plzeň, gastronomical exhibitions located just 250 metres (820 feet) from the central Náměstí Republiky.

== Features ==
Since 2008, it has hosted a 1,720-seat, ten-screen multiplex cinema operated by Cinema City Czech Republic.

== See also ==
- List of shopping malls in the Czech Republic
