= Unibail-Rodamco-Westfield =

French real estate company

Unibail-Rodamco-Westfield SE

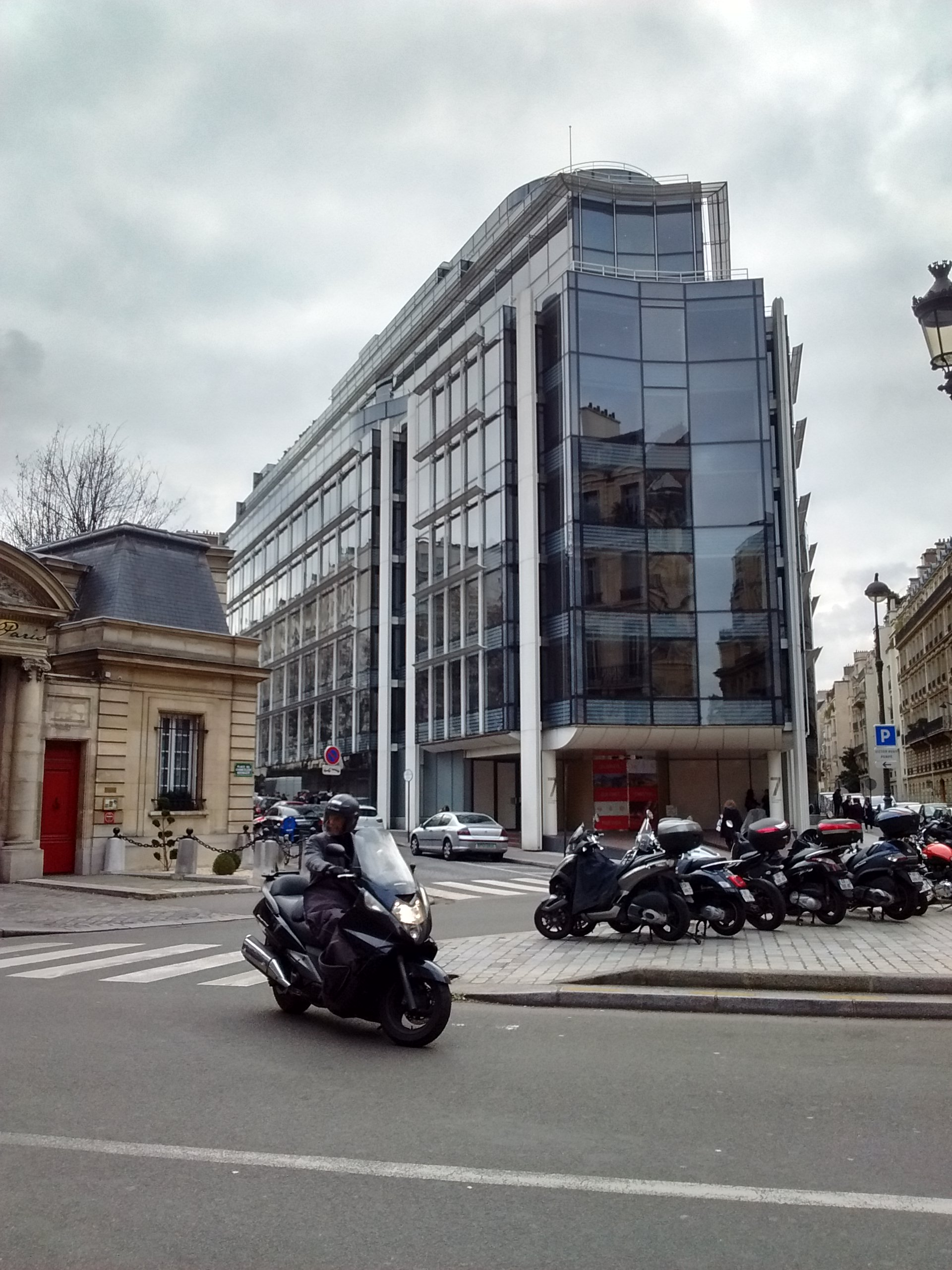
- Headquarters in Paris, France
- Type: Public (Societas Europaea)
- Traded as: Euronext Amsterdam: URW; AEX Component; CAC 40 Component
- ISIN: FR0013326246
- Industry: Commercial real estate
- Genre: Shopping centres; office buildings; convention centers
- Predecessors: Unibail (1968), Rodamco Europe (1999)
- Founded: 27 June 2007; 19 years ago
- Headquarters: Paris, France
- Area served: Austria; Czech Republic; France; Germany; Netherlands; Poland; Spain; Sweden; United Kingdom; United States
- Key people: Vincent Rouget (CEO and chairman of the management board); Jacques Richier (chairman of the supervisory board)
- Net income: €1.27 billion (2025)
- Total assets: €49 billion (portfolio value) (2026)
- Owner: Xavier Niel family (25.5%)
- Number of employees: 1,600 (2026)
- Website: www.urw.com

Unibail-Rodamco-Westfield SE (URW, previously Unibail-Rodamco SE) is a multinational commercial real estate company headquartered in Paris, France. It owns, develops and operates large shopping centres in Europe and the United States, most of them under the Westfield brand, together with office buildings in Paris and, through Viparis, the main convention and exhibition centres of the Paris region.

The group was formed by the 2007 merger of the French company Unibail (founded in 1968) and the Dutch Rodamco Europe (founded in 1999), which became Unibail-Rodamco. In 2018, Unibail-Rodamco acquired the US and UK operations of the Australian shopping centre operator Westfield Corporation to form the current company. Many of its shopping centres use the Westfield brand launched by the Australian Westfield Group in 1960 and shared with Scentre Group for properties in Australia and New Zealand since 2014.

The acquisition of Westfield, made at the top of the market and followed by the COVID-19 pandemic, plunged the heavily indebted group into a financial crisis that led to a shareholder revolt in 2020. Since 2021 it has been reducing its debt through asset sales. Its largest shareholder is the family of the French businessman Xavier Niel, with about a quarter of the capital. As of June 2026, the group owned 66 shopping centres in the US and Europe, representing around 88% of its €49 billion portfolio, 41 of them operating under the Westfield brand.

== History ==
=== Unibail: from leasing to property ownership ===
Unibail was founded in 1968 by the bank Worms & Cie as a Sicomi, a French real estate company that financed shops and industrial premises through finance leases. In the early 1990s, under Léon Bressler, chairman from 1992 to 2006, Unibail moved out of lease financing and became the owner, developer and operator of large, hard-to-replicate assets. It built a portfolio of close to 30 shopping centres across France, including the Forum des Halles and the arcade within the CNIT, and substantial office properties in Paris and La Défense, including the Tour Ariane. In 2000 it took control of Paris Expo, the operator of the city's exhibition centres. Unibail joined the CAC 40 index in June 2007.

Rodamco Europe was formed in 1999 when Rodamco, a property investment fund set up by the Dutch asset management group Robeco in 1979, broke up into several independent listed companies covering different parts of the world. Rodamco Europe built a portfolio consisting mainly of shopping centres and other retail space across 14 European countries, along with some office property in France and the Netherlands, acquiring smaller European rivals in the process.

=== 2007–2017: Unibail-Rodamco ===
Unibail-Rodamco logo, used until 2018

On 10 April 2007, Rodamco Europe announced a merger of equals with Unibail to create the largest publicly traded property company in Europe. The merger was confirmed on 21 June 2007, after Unibail announced the acquisition of 80% of Rodamco's shares, making its offer for the remainder unconditional. The merged entity took effect as a société anonyme under the name Unibail-Rodamco on 25 June 2007.

In January 2008, the group merged its convention and exhibition business with that of the Paris Chamber of Commerce and Industry, creating Viparis, a 50/50 joint venture that operates venues such as the Paris Expo Porte de Versailles, the Palais des congrès de Paris and Paris Nord Villepinte. In May 2009, Unibail-Rodamco became a Societas Europaea, the first CAC 40 company to adopt this status.

On 1 June 2011, Unibail-Rodamco hired former Fnac CEO Christophe Cuvillier as chief operating officer. Working with Guillaume Poitrinal, chief executive and chairman of the management board, he led the company through five years of growth despite difficult economic conditions, and succeeded Poitrinal as chief executive in 2013. The group concentrated on large shopping centres in the main European cities and sold smaller assets. In May 2015, it agreed to sell its 46.1% stake in German shopping mall operator MFI AG to the Canada Pension Plan Investment Board for €394 million.

=== 2018–2019: Acquisition of Westfield ===
Westfield logo, in use from 1960 to present

In December 2017, Unibail-Rodamco agreed to take over Westfield Corporation, which operated 35 shopping centres in the US and the UK, for a reported US$24.8 billion, paid two-thirds in shares. The shopping centres in Australia and New Zealand branded as Westfield and held by Scentre Group were not part of the deal. The deal was completed in June 2018, and a number of shopping centres owned by Unibail-Rodamco before the merger were rebranded as Westfield, with 10 flagships rebranding from September 2019. With the acquisition, URW also took over Westfield's long-planned shopping centre project in Segrate, near Milan, Italy (see below).

=== 2020: Pandemic and shareholder revolt ===
The COVID-19 pandemic hit an already heavily indebted group hard: its centres were closed for months, rents were cut and many retailers went bankrupt. URW reported a net loss of more than €7.6 billion for 2020, mainly due to writedowns on the value of its properties.

To shore up its balance sheet, the management proposed a €3.5 billion rights issue. Léon Bressler, Unibail's former chairman, and Xavier Niel, who had built a stake of more than 5%, opposed the plan and called for the group to focus on its best European assets and exit the US. On 10 November 2020, the capital increase received only 61.6% of the votes, short of the two-thirds majority required, and shareholders elected Bressler, Niel and the Spanish businesswoman Susana Gallardo to the supervisory board. Colin Dyer resigned as supervisory board chairman but remained on the board, and was replaced by Bressler. Christophe Cuvillier stepped down, and in January 2021 Jean-Marie Tritant became chairman of the management board and chief executive officer.

=== 2021–2025: Deleveraging ===
The new management suspended the dividend for three years and announced a radical reduction of the group's presence in the United States, while keeping its two London centres. URW stepped up the sale of offices and of shopping centres considered non-core. Xavier Niel raised his stake to more than 23% of the capital in October 2021, and in 2024 transferred his shares to his children, the family then holding 25.5%.

In March 2021, URW opened Westfield Mall of the Netherlands in Leidschendam. In 2022 it launched Westfield Rise, an in-house media, brand experience and data partnerships agency. Its largest European project, Westfield Hamburg-Überseequartier in the HafenCity district of Hamburg, opened in April 2025 with 170 shops and restaurants, although its cost had risen from €1.64 billion to €2.16 billion. The same year, URW launched a licensing business: Cenomi Centers agreed to use the Westfield name for up to eight of its shopping centres in Saudi Arabia, with URW providing support in leasing, operations, marketing and retail media.

In 2025, footfall in its centres rose by 1.9% and tenant sales by 3.9%. Adjusted recurring earnings reached €1.45 billion, the loan-to-value ratio fell to 42% and the dividend was raised by 30%. By June 2026, a total of 21 centres in Europe had been rebranded as Westfield.

=== Since 2026: New management ===
In October 2025, URW announced the departure of Jean-Marie Tritant. In January 2026 he was succeeded as CEO and chairman of the management board by Vincent Rouget, a former partner at the investment firm Aermont Capital, who had joined URW in 2023 as chief strategy and investment officer and was acting COO for Europe.

Rouget adjusted the strategy in the United States. In February 2026 the group ended its programme of large-scale US disposals while continuing selective sales, and in June it agreed to buy the 50% of Westfield UTC in San Diego that it did not already own, for $705 million. By June 2026 its €2.2 billion disposal plan had been completed and its loan-to-value ratio had fallen to 41.9%; the group aims to bring it down to 40% by 2028.

== Operations ==
=== Shopping centres ===
Shopping centres account for around 88% of the group's portfolio. As of June 2026 it owned 66 centres in Europe and the United States, 41 of them under the Westfield brand. In the first half of 2026, tenant sales rose by 5.2% and footfall by 2.1%, while vacancy in its shopping centres fell to a record low of 4.1%.

Main shopping centres owned by the group in 2026
Country	Main centres
France	Forum des Halles, Carrousel du Louvre (Paris); Les Quatre Temps, CNIT (La Défense); Parly 2, Vélizy 2, Rosny 2, Carré Sénart, So Ouest, Aéroville (Île-de-France); La Part-Dieu, Confluence (Lyon)
Spain	La Maquinista, Glòries (Barcelona); Parquesur, La Vaguada (Madrid)
United Kingdom	Westfield London, Westfield Stratford City (London), Westfield St James Quarter (Edinburgh)
Germany	Westfield Hamburg-Überseequartier (Hamburg); CentrO (Oberhausen); Ruhr Park (Bochum)
Netherlands	Westfield Mall of the Netherlands (Leidschendam)
Sweden	Westfield Mall of Scandinavia, Täby Centrum (Stockholm)
Austria	Donau Zentrum (Vienna)
Poland	Arkadia, Mokotów, Złote Tarasy (Warsaw)
Czech Republic	Chodov, Černý Most (Prague)
United States	Century City, Topanga (Los Angeles); Valley Fair (Santa Clara); UTC (San Diego); Garden State Plaza (New Jersey); World Trade Center (New York)

=== Westfield Milan project ===
In 2011, Westfield formed a joint venture with Stilo Immobiliare Finanziaria, part of the Percassi group of Bergamo, to build a large shopping centre on a site of about 60 hectares in Segrate, next to Milan Linate Airport. The opening, initially planned for 2018, has been postponed several times; in 2019, URW's country manager put the total investment, including road works, at around €1.4 billion. After being frozen for several years, the project was relaunched in 2023. In November 2025, the Lombardy region, the city of Milan, Segrate, the Italian rail network operator Rete Ferroviaria Italiana and the joint venture signed an agreement for "Milano Porta Est", an intermodal hub next to the centre with a new railway station served by high-speed trains and an extension of the M4 metro line. No opening date has been announced.

=== Offices and conventions ===
The group develops and owns office buildings in Paris and La Défense, which it sells periodically. Through Viparis it operates the main convention and exhibition centres of the Paris region.

Unibail-Rodamco-Westfield has worked with architectural firms such as Thomas Mayne of Morphosis, Herzog & de Meuron, RIADH group (De La Hoz, Cottrell, Michelangeli), Farshid Moussavi Architecture, Cuno & Jean Brullmann Crochon-Luc, and Jean-Paul Viguier.

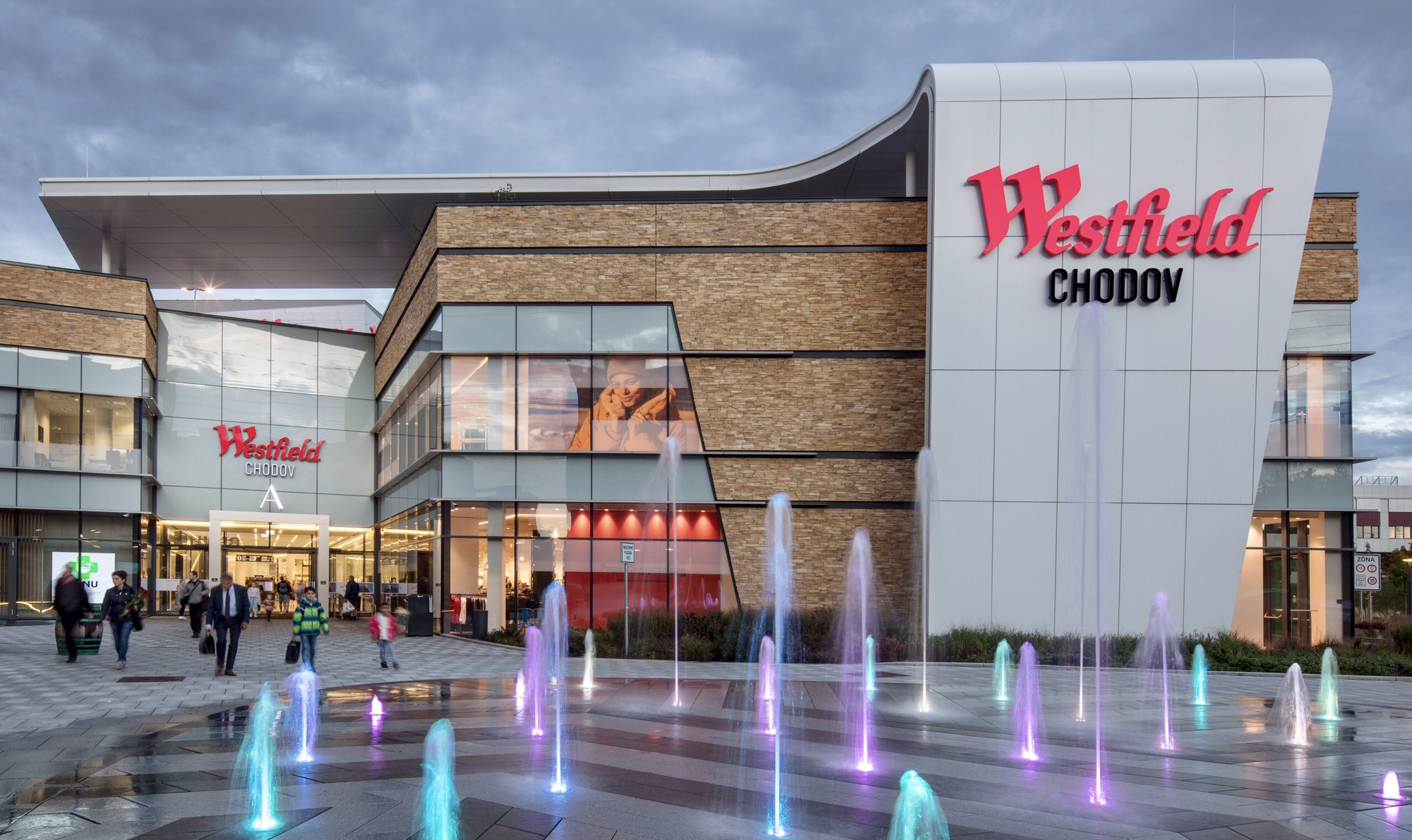
Westfield Chodov, the largest shopping mall in Prague, owned by Unibail-Rodamco-Westfield

== Sustainability ==
URW's sustainability performance has been widely recognised. The group ranked 24th in Corporate Knights' 2025 Global 100 list of the world's most sustainable companies, and first in the real estate category. For seven consecutive years it has received CDP's top "A" rating for climate change, and in the 2024 GRESB assessment it ranked second among European listed retail real estate companies, with an overall score of 92 out of 100. Time named it one of the world's 100 most sustainable companies in 2025. In 2015, Standard Ethics Aei included the group in its Standard Ethics French Index.

== Corporate affairs ==
=== Governance ===
URW is a Societas Europaea with a two-tier structure of a management board and a supervisory board. As of 2026, the management board consists of:

- Vincent Rouget – Group Chief Executive Officer and chairman of the management board
- Anne-Sophie Sancerre – Chief Customer and Retail Officer, COO Europe
- Kathleen Verelst – Chief Investment Officer
- Fabrice Mouchel – Group Chief Financial Officer
- Sylvain Montcouquiol – Chief Resources and Sustainability Officer

The supervisory board is chaired by Jacques Richier.

=== Shareholders ===
The largest shareholder is the family holding group of Xavier Niel, which owns 25.5% of the capital and voting rights, mainly through the company Rock Investment. Niel sat on the supervisory board from 2020 until October 2024, when he resigned following his appointment to the board of ByteDance, and returned to it on 29 April 2025. His son Jules Niel joined the supervisory board in August 2025. The rest of the capital is widely held, mainly by institutional investors.

=== Stapled shares ===
URW shares are "stapled": each consists of one share of Unibail-Rodamco-Westfield SE and one share of the Dutch company Unibail-Rodamco-Westfield N.V. They are listed on Euronext Amsterdam and Euronext Paris, with a secondary listing on the Australian Securities Exchange in the form of CHESS Depositary Interests, allowing former Westfield securityholders to trade them locally.
