= Letňany =

Municipal area of Prague, Czech Republic

- Cadastral Area of Prague
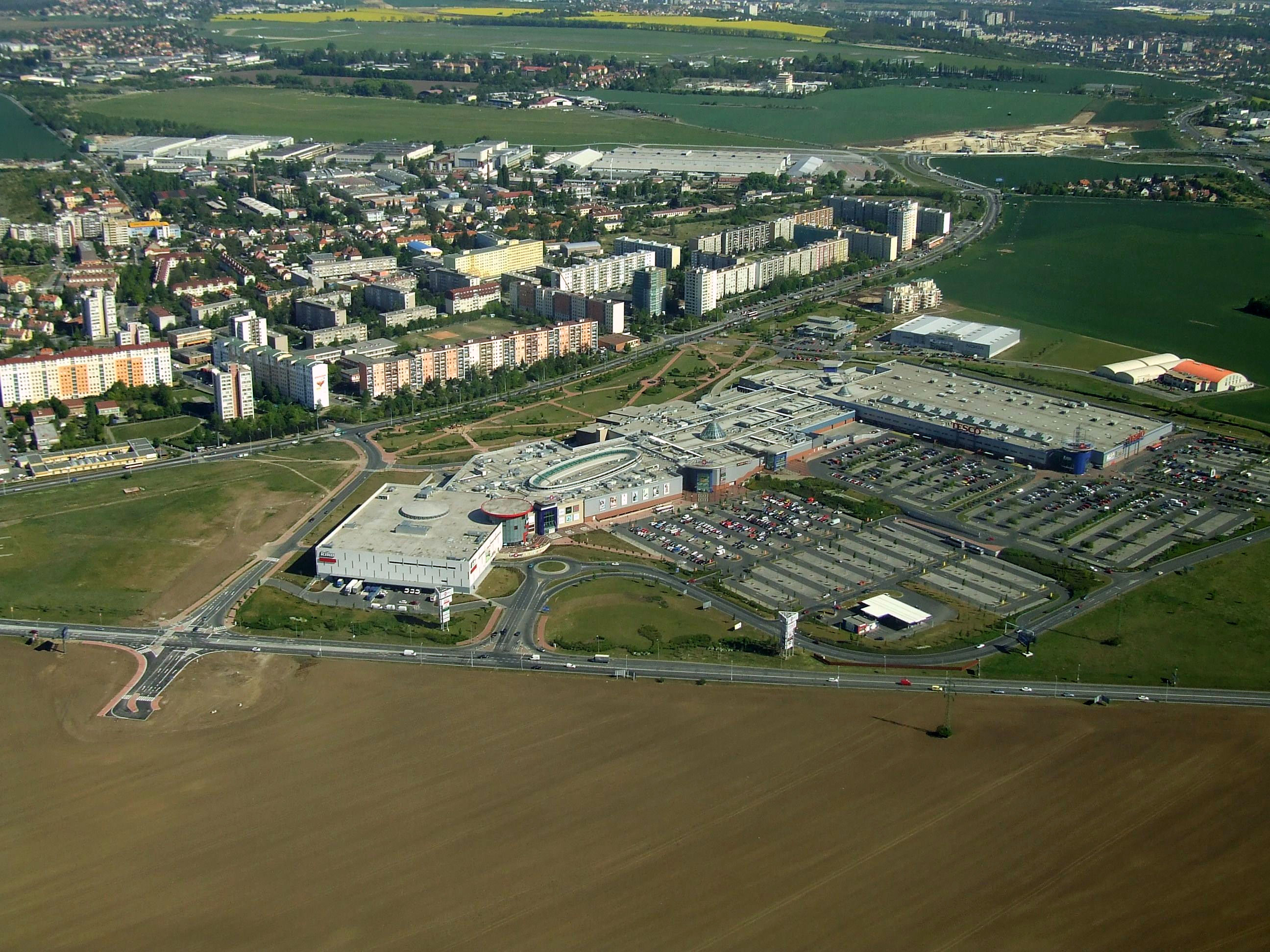
- Aerial view of Letňany

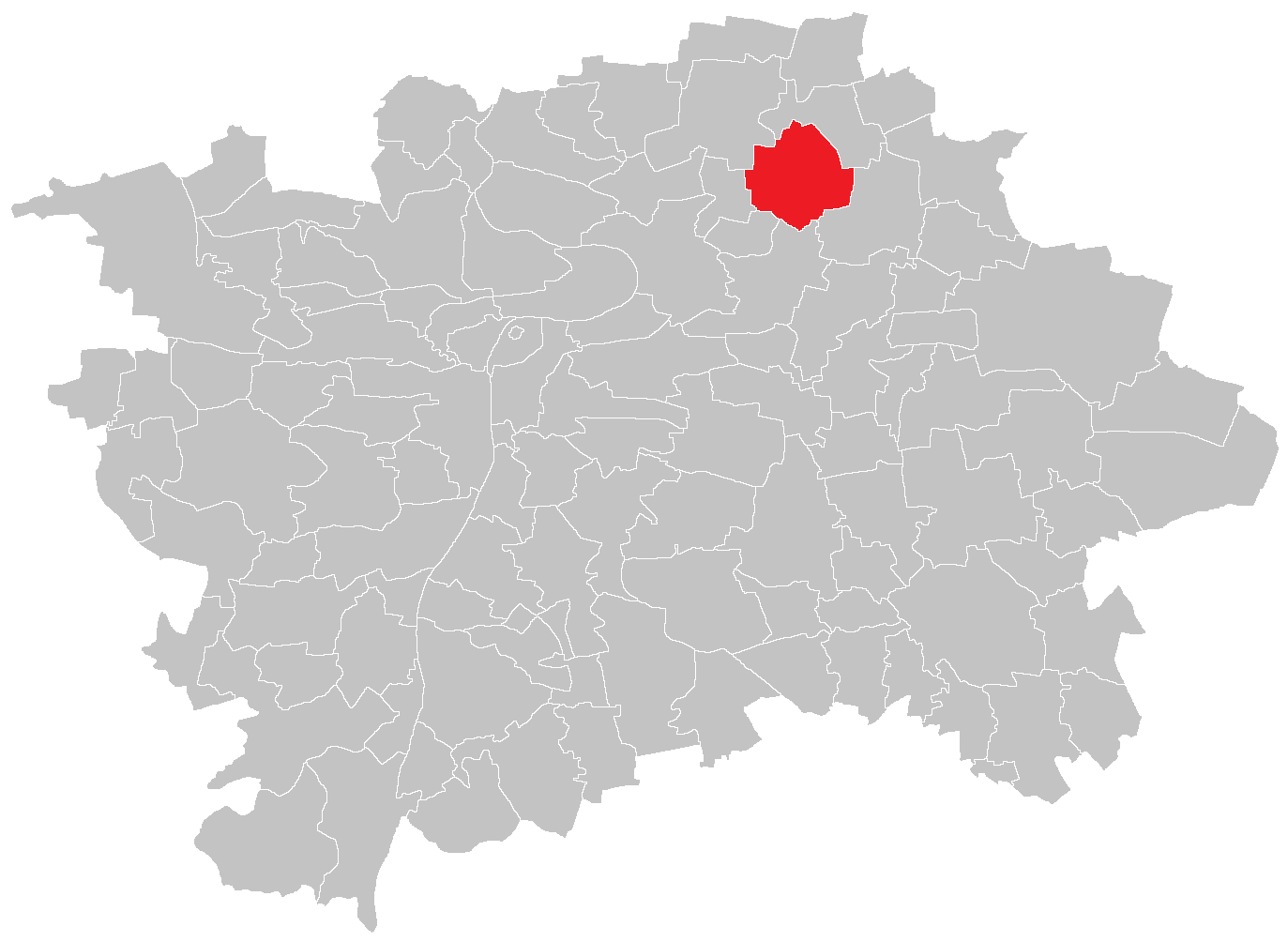
- Location of Letňany in Prague
- Coordinates: 50°08′13″N 14°30′52″E
- Country: Czech Republic
- Region: Prague
- District: Prague 18

Area
  - Total: 5.61 km^{2} (2.17 sq mi)

Population (2021)
  - Total: 21,702
  - Density: 3,870/km^{2} (10,000/sq mi)
- Time zone: UTC+1 (CET)
  - Summer (DST): UTC+2 (CEST)
- Postal code: 199 00
- Website: letnany.cz

Letňany is a neighbourhood and cadastral territory in northeastern Prague, Czechia. It forms the municipal district of Prague 18 and became part of the city in 1968. Extensive housing estates were built during the 1970s and 1980s.

During the interwar period, aircraft manufacturers such as Avia and Letov established factories in Letňany. Aerospace manufacturing and research continue in the area, which is home to VZLU Aerospace.

The area has two neighbouring airports, Letňany Airport and Kbely military airport. Letňany metro station, the northern terminus of Line C, opened in May 2008.

Letňany also contains the PVA EXPO PRAHA exhibition grounds and Letňany shopping centre.

== Government ==
The Air Accidents Investigation Institute has its head office in Letňany.

== Demographics ==
Historical population

Year	Pop.	±%
1869	395	—
1880	440	+11.4%
1890	606	+37.7%
1900	707	+16.7%
1910	754	+6.6%
1921	718	−4.8%
1930	1,527	+112.7%
1950	2,040	+33.6%

Year	Pop.	±%
1961	2,550	+25.0%
1970	3,619	+41.9%
1980	10,666	+194.7%
1991	14,432	+35.3%
2001	14,275	−1.1%
2011	16,996	+19.1%
2021	21,702	+27.7%

Source: Censuses

== Aerospace industry and research ==
During the interwar period, Letov, Avia, and the aviation division of ČKD built aircraft in Letňany. The predecessor of VZLU Aerospace, the aeronautical research and testing establishment, moved to Letňany in 1927.

Groupe Latécoère makes aircraft doors and other components at the former Letov factory. Avia Propeller manufactures aircraft propellers near Letňany Airport.

VZLU Aerospace maintains its research, development, and testing centre in Letňany. Its campus also includes a science and technology park focused primarily on aerospace, defence, and security industries.

== Concerts ==
Major outdoor concerts have been held at Letňany Airport since 2015, when Kabát played there. Performers have included the Rolling Stones, Metallica, and Ed Sheeran. The events generate municipal revenue but have also prompted complaints about noise and parking disruption.

Date	Performer(s)	Tour or festival	Reported attendance
23 June 2015	Kabát	Open Air Tour 2015	—
12 September 2015	Daniel Landa	Velekoncert	—
22 May 2016	AC/DC	Rock or Bust World Tour	Approximately 60,000
11 June 2017	Linkin Park	Aerodrome Festival	Approximately 25,000
4 July 2017	Guns N' Roses	Not in This Lifetime... Tour	Nearly 50,000
19 August 2017	Robbie Williams	The Heavy Entertainment Show Tour	—
13 June 2018	Ozzy Osbourne	Prague Rocks	Approximately 35,000
20 June 2018	Iron Maiden	Legacy of the Beast World Tour	Approximately 30,000
4 July 2018	The Rolling Stones	No Filter Tour	65,250 tickets sold
26 May 2019	Muse	Simulation Theory World Tour	—
7–8 July 2019	Ed Sheeran	÷ Tour	Approximately 150,000 combined
18 August 2019	Metallica	WorldWired Tour	Approximately 70,000
15–16 May 2022	Rammstein	Rammstein Stadium Tour	—
5–6 June 2022	Imagine Dragons	Mercury Tour	—
18 June 2022	Guns N' Roses	Guns N' Roses 2020 Tour	Approximately 35,000
22 June 2022	Metallica	Prague Rocks	—
2 June 2023	Def Leppard and Mötley Crüe	Prague Rocks	—
21 June 2023	Maroon 5 and Gwen Stefani	Prague Rocks	—
30 July 2023	Depeche Mode	Memento Mori World Tour	Approximately 60,000
6 August 2023	The Weeknd	After Hours til Dawn Tour	Approximately 60,000
11–12 May 2024	Rammstein	Rammstein Stadium Tour	Approximately 120,000 combined
31 May 2025	Iron Maiden	Run for Your Lives World Tour	Approximately 60,000
9 and 11 June 2025	Imagine Dragons	Loom World Tour	—
15 June 2025	Bruce Springsteen and the E Street Band	The Land of Hope & Dreams Tour	Approximately 60,000
26 June 2025	AC/DC	Power Up Tour	Approximately 60,000
12 August 2025	Post Malone	The Big Ass World Tour	—
