= Air Accidents Investigation Institute =

Government agency investigating aviation accidents and incidents in Prague

- Ústav pro odborné zjišťování příčin leteckých nehod

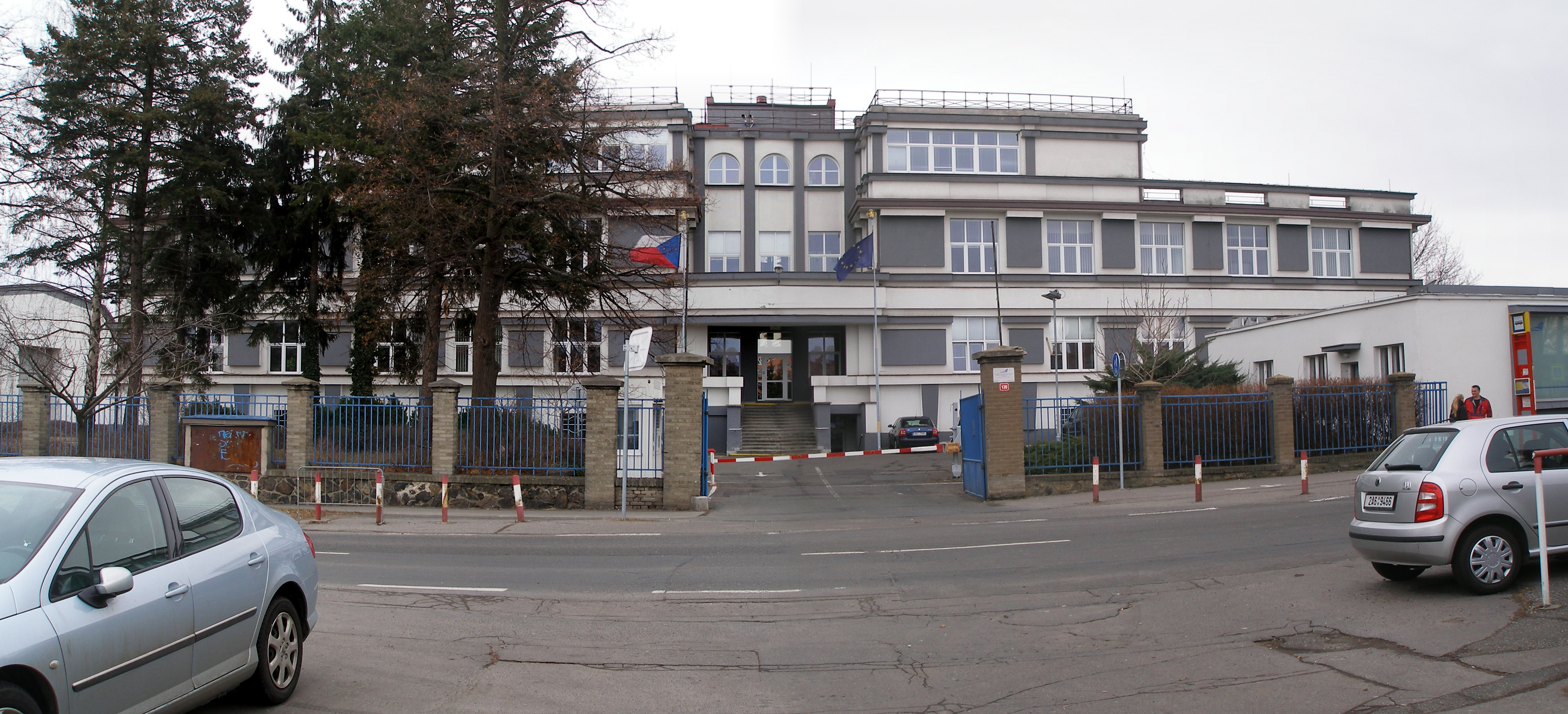
- AAII headquarters in the building of Aerospace Research and Test Establishment (VZLÚ)
- Abbreviation: AAII
- Formation: 2003; 23 years ago
- Type: Government agency
- Location: Prague 18, Czech Republic
- Coordinates: 50°7′59″N 14°30′51″E
- Website: uzpln.cz/en

Air Accidents Investigation Institute (AAII, Czech: Ústav pro odborné zjišťování příčin leteckých nehod, ÚZPLN) is the Czech Republic government agency investigating aviation accidents and incidents. It is headquartered in Letňany, 18th district, Prague.

== History ==
On 14 October 2002, the Czech government passed resolution no.1006, which approved the statutes of the AAII and appointed Pavel Štrůbl as the agency's first managing director. The AAII began on 1 January 2003. Formerly the Civil Aviation Authority had the accident investigation competencies of the current AAII.

The AAII was established with the Czech name originally being Ústav pro odborně technické zjišťování příčin leteckých nehod since January 2003. In July 2006, was renamed ("odborné" instead of "odborně technické") to its current Czech name. The organization has had the same English name, since its inception.
