= Prague 18 =

Prague 18 Praha 18
- Municipal District of Prague; Administrative District of Prague
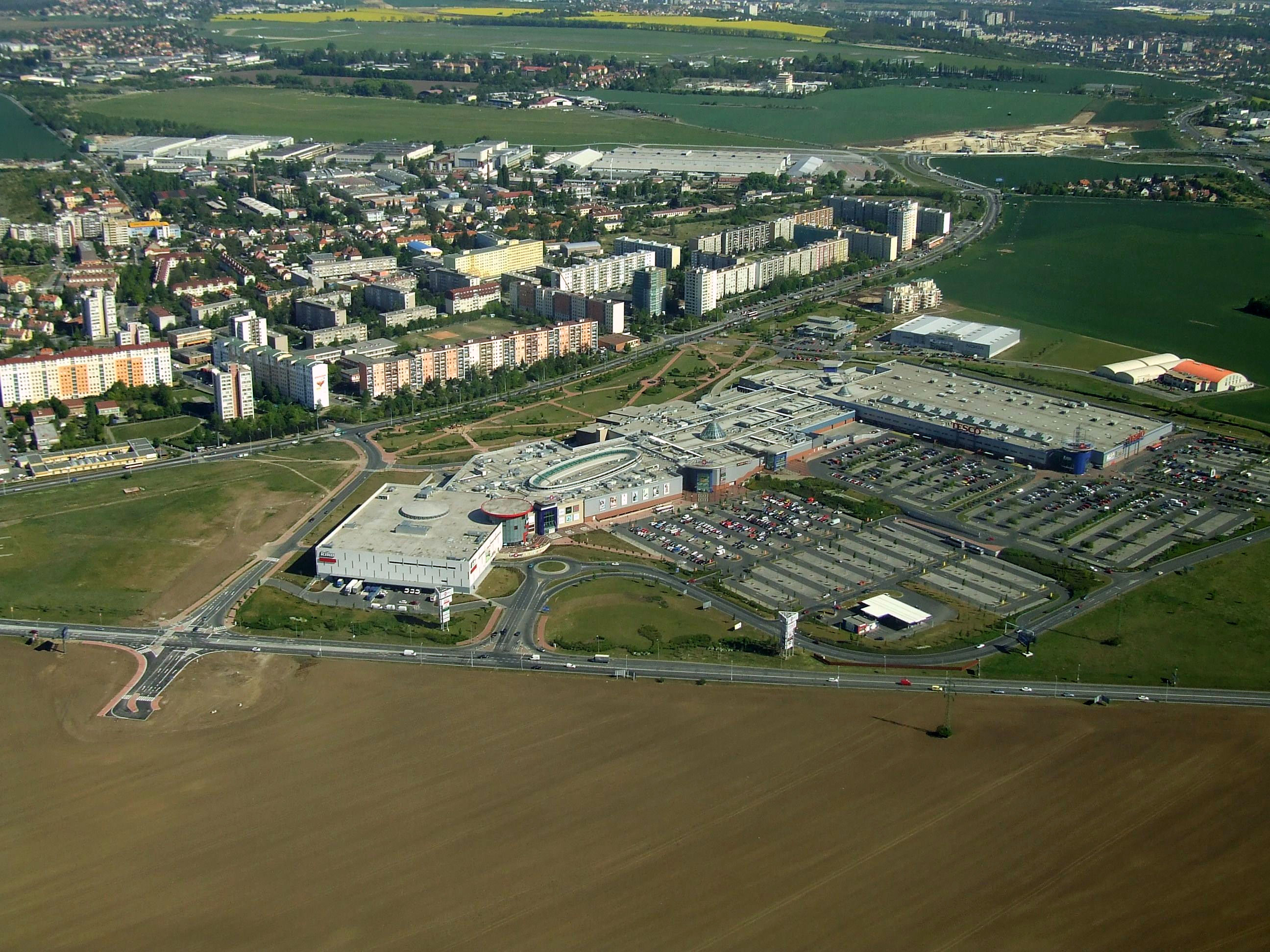
- Aerial view of Letňany

- Flag Coat of arms

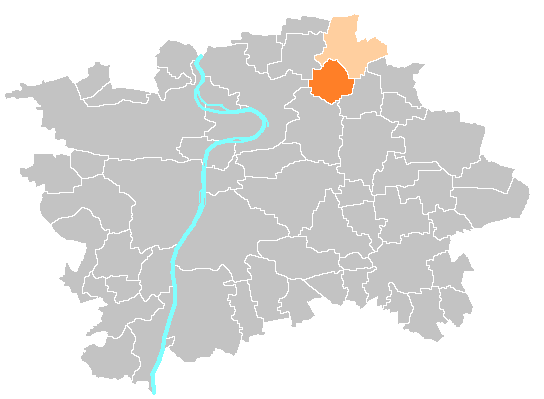
- Location of Prague 18 in Prague
- Coordinates: 50°8′10″N 14°30′36″E
- Country: Czech Republic
- Region: Prague

Government
  - Mayor: Zdeněk Kučera

Area
  - Total: 5.61 km^{2} (2.17 sq mi)

Population (2021)
  - Total: 21,702
  - Density: 3,870/km^{2} (10,000/sq mi)
- Time zone: UTC+1 (CET)
  - Summer (DST): UTC+2 (CEST)
- Postal code: 199 00
- Website: http://www.praha18.cz

Prague 18 is a municipal district (městská část) in Prague. It is located in the north-eastern part of the city. It is formed by one cadastre Letňany. Prague 18 has 21,702 inhabitants as of 2021.

The administrative district (správní obvod) of the same name consists of municipal districts Prague 18 and Čakovice.

== Demographics ==
Historical population
Year	Pop.	±%
1869	395	—
1880	440	+11.4%
1890	606	+37.7%
1900	707	+16.7%
1910	754	+6.6%
1921	718	−4.8%
1930	1,527	+112.7%
1950	2,040	+33.6%
1961	2,550	+25.0%
1970	3,619	+41.9%
1980	10,666	+194.7%
1991	14,432	+35.3%
2001	14,275	−1.1%
2011	16,996	+19.1%
2021	21,702	+27.7%
Source: Censuses
