= Obchodní centrum Letňany =

OC Letňany

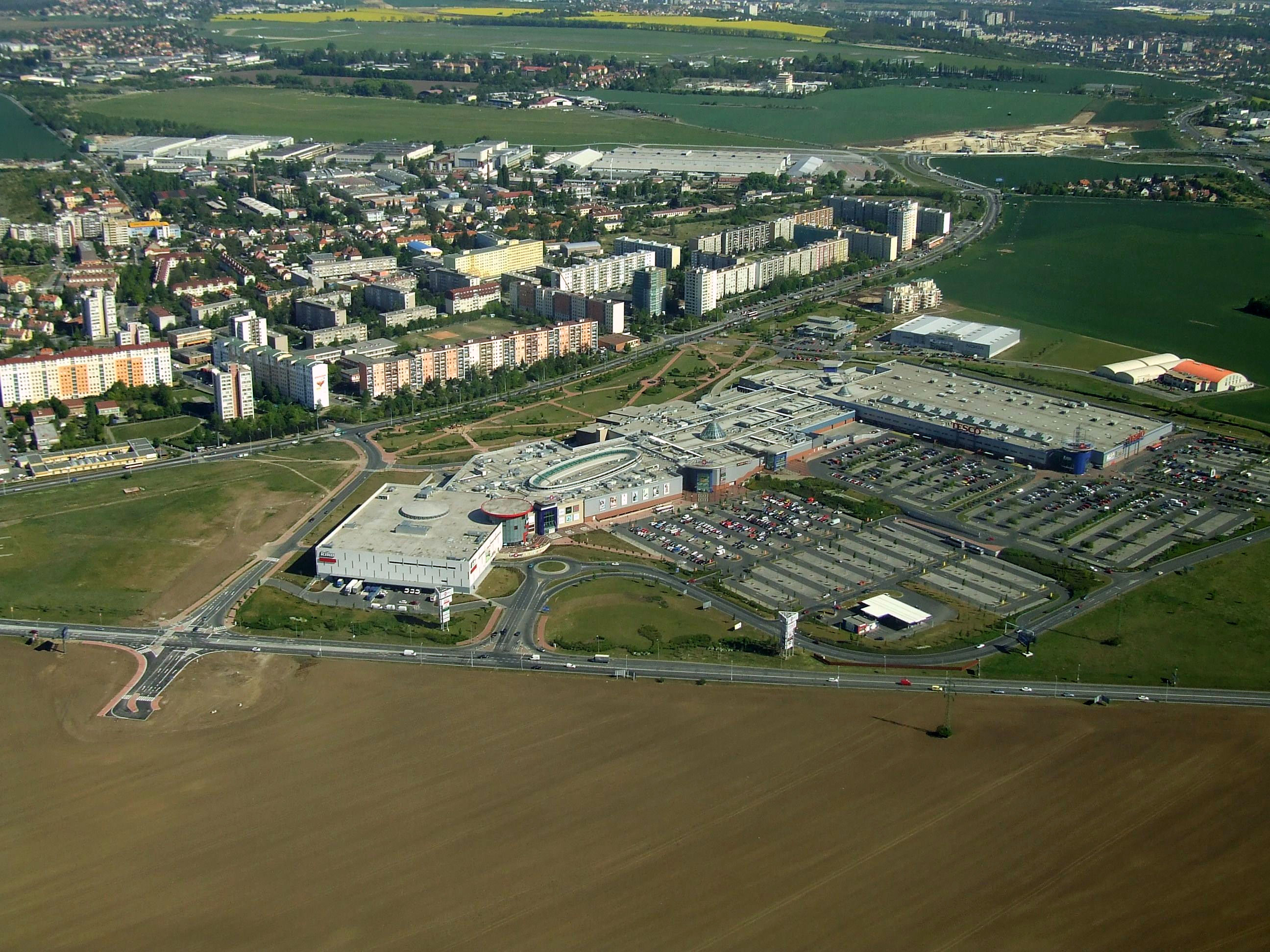
- Location: Veselská 663, Prague, Czech Republic, 199 00
- Coordinates: 50°8′11.47″N 14°30′6.41″E
- Num. of stores: 130
- Floor area: 125,000 square metres (1,350,000 sq ft)
- Parking: 3,200 spaces
- Website: www.oc-letnany.cz

Obchodní centrum Letňany, also known as OC Letňany, is a shopping mall located in the Letňany district of Prague, Czech Republic. With 130 shops and an area of 125,000 square metres (1,350,000 sq ft), it is the largest shopping centre in the Czech Republic. The complex was described by The Prague Post in 2001 as "one of the best malls in the city". According to OC Letňany's marketing manager, over 10 million customers visited the shopping centre in 2008.

== History ==
OC Letňany became the largest shopping centre in the Czech Republic in 2006, when its third phase of construction increased its area from 65,000 square metres (700,000 sq ft) to 125,000 square metres (1,350,000 sq ft).

== Tenants ==
One of the principal stores at OC Letňany is Tesco, which opened on the site in 1999. The store was remodelled in 2014, with its floor space decreasing from 11,000 to 8,000 square metres, owing to a new division between clothing and other products.

A Cinema City multiplex cinema, a babysitting service, and two indoor ice rinks, open throughout the year, are also located within the mall. Letnany's food court features a wide variety of international options including Thai, Japanese, Middle Eastern, Chinese, Indian, French and Czech cuisine. In 2011, plans were announced for a McDonald's as well as a car dealership to be added to the mall's facilities.

== Transport ==
Prior to the metro Line C extension in 2008, the centre was served with regular bus services from the Nádraží Holešovice metro station, with the closest bus stop being the stop Tupolevova, located in close proximity to the mall.

On 25 November 2002, a free bus service was set up to transport passengers to the shopping center. Originally serving the route from the Nádraží Holešovice metro station, the line was then shrunk with each extension of the metro line C to Ládví in 2004, and finally to the Letňany metro station on 10 May 2008.

The free bus service was eventually cancelled on 31 May 2017, as it was underutilized and did not serve any extra purpose from the regular bus services provided by the PID lines serving the area.

== See also ==
- List of shopping malls in the Czech Republic
