= Christophe Cuvillier =

French businessman

- Born: 5 December 1962 (age 63); Etterbeek, Belgium
- Education: HEC Paris
- Occupation: CEO of Unibail-Rodamco-Westfield
- Employer: Unibail-Rodamco-Westfield

Christophe Cuvillier (born 5 December 1962) is a French businessman and current chief executive officer of the European real-estate group Unibail-Rodamco-Westfield.

== Education ==
Cuvillier studied at the ESADE business school in Barcelona, Spain and then the University of California, Berkeley. He completed his studies at HEC Paris, where he received his diploma in international business management in 1984.

== Career ==
=== 1986–2000: Lancome, L'Oreal Group ===
Cullivier began his business career as a sales trainee at the luxury cosmetics brand Lancôme, part of L’Oreal, in 1986. At Lancôme, he rose through the ranks to managing director of the company’s United Kingdom branch in 1992, before moving to Sydney as director of L’Oreal’s Australian Luxury Products division in 1993.

In 1995, Cuvillier returned to Lancôme as the managing director of its operations in France, and in 1998 he became director of L’Oreal’s Luxury Products Division in France.

=== 2000–2011: Kering Group ===
In 2000, Cuvillier left L’Oreâl to join the Kering Group (formerly PPR) as chief operating officer of Marketing and Products at Fnac, one of its subsidiaries. In 2003, he was named Fnac’s chief operating officer of International and development, and in 2005 he became chief executive officer of Conforama, another Kering brand. In 2008, he was appointed chairman and chief executive officer of Fnac, a post he served until 2011.

=== 2011–present: Unibail-Rodamco ===
Cuvillier left the luxury sector in 2011, joining real-estate group Unibail-Rodamco (Unibail-Rodamco-Westfield since 2018) as chief operating officer and a member of its Management Board. In April 2013, he succeeded Guillaume Poitrinal as chairman and CEO of the company, a position Poitrinal had held since 2005.

== Personal life ==
Christophe Cuvillier is married to Kateri Loeb, and together they have three children. He also holds the Knight insignia of the French Legion of Honor.

Business positions
Preceded by Guillaume Poitrinal	CEO of Unibail-Rodamco-Westfield; 2013–present	Succeeded by Incumbent
