= Jacques Richier =

- Born: February 12, 1955; Morocco
- Education: INSA Lyon; HEC Paris
- Occupations: Chairman and CEO of Allianz France
- Known for: CEO of Allianz France 2010-
- Children: 4

Jacques Richier (born in 1955 in Morocco) is a French business executive in the insurance industry who is the CEO of Allianz France as of 2010.

== Early life and education ==
Jacques Richier obtained a postgraduate degree in Physics from INSA Lyon. After being offered a visiting scholar position by the Lawrence Berkeley National Laboratory in Biophysics, California (USA), he took an MBA course in HEC Paris in 1984.

== Career ==
Jacques Richier spent the early years of his career in the oil industry. He then came to the insurance business in 1985, joining AZUR, a Mutual Insurance Company. There, he was IT and Organization Manager before being appointed CEO and both chairman and CEO as of 1998.

In 2000, he joined Swiss Life France as CEO, becoming chairman and CEO three years later. In 2008, Jacques Richier was offered the position of CEO of AGF (Assurances Générales de France), with the mission to conduct the integration of AGF into the European group Allianz. He was nominated in 2010 Chairman and CEO of Allianz France. As of 2014, he also took over responsibilities as chairman of the newly created Allianz Worldwide Partners, a business unit dedicated to B2B2C activities (business-to-business-to-consumer).

== Personal life ==
Married, and father of 4 children, Jacques Richier received the title of Chevalier in the National Order of Merit (France).
