= Roger Cuvillier =

French inventor and engineer (1922–2019)

- Born: July 2, 1922; Lille, France
- Died: January 14, 2019 (aged 96)
- Education: École Centrale Paris, École supérieure d'optique
- Occupation(s): Inventor, engineer
- Known for: Optical compensation zoom lens

Roger Cuvillier (French: [ʁɔʒe kyvilje]; July 2, 1922 – January 14, 2019) was a French inventor and engineer, who invented the Pan Cinor, the first optical compensation zoom lens.

== Early life and education ==
Roger Cuvilier was born in Lille, in the Nord department of France. He studied at Centrale, graduating in 1947, and at the École supérieure d'optique, graduating in 1949. He then went to work for SOM-Berthiot, and stayed there until retirement as head of that company's main factory in Dijon.

== The Pan Cinor ==
Rule at SOM-Berthiot was for new recruits to tour the various departments of that company as trainees. This was a time of relative freedom, which he used to work on a problem a friend working for film industry, Roger Cornu, had suggested: creating a single camera lens to replace the three ones used on movie cameras. Working on a device based on four lenses and two sliding tubes, Roger Cuvillier and his team developed the prototype of a zoom lens which was optically corrected, enabling its focal length to be tripled without moving the focal plane. It was patented on January 28, 1949, as French patent No.983.129. Sales started in 1950, under the name Pan Cinor, "Cinor" being the brand name of SOM-Berthiot film lenses. The Pan Cinor was made in the SOM-Berthiot factory in Dijon, under the direction of Cuvillier, up to circa 1970.
