= Avion Shopping Park Ostrava =

Shopping centre in Ostrava, Czech Republic

Entrance to the centre (2009)

Avion Shopping Park Ostrava is a shopping centre in Ostrava, Czech Republic. The centre opened in December 2001 and underwent a major expansion in 2008, adding new retail space and an underground car park with 600 parking spaces. Between 2012 and 2013, the oldest section of the centre was extensively reconstructed.

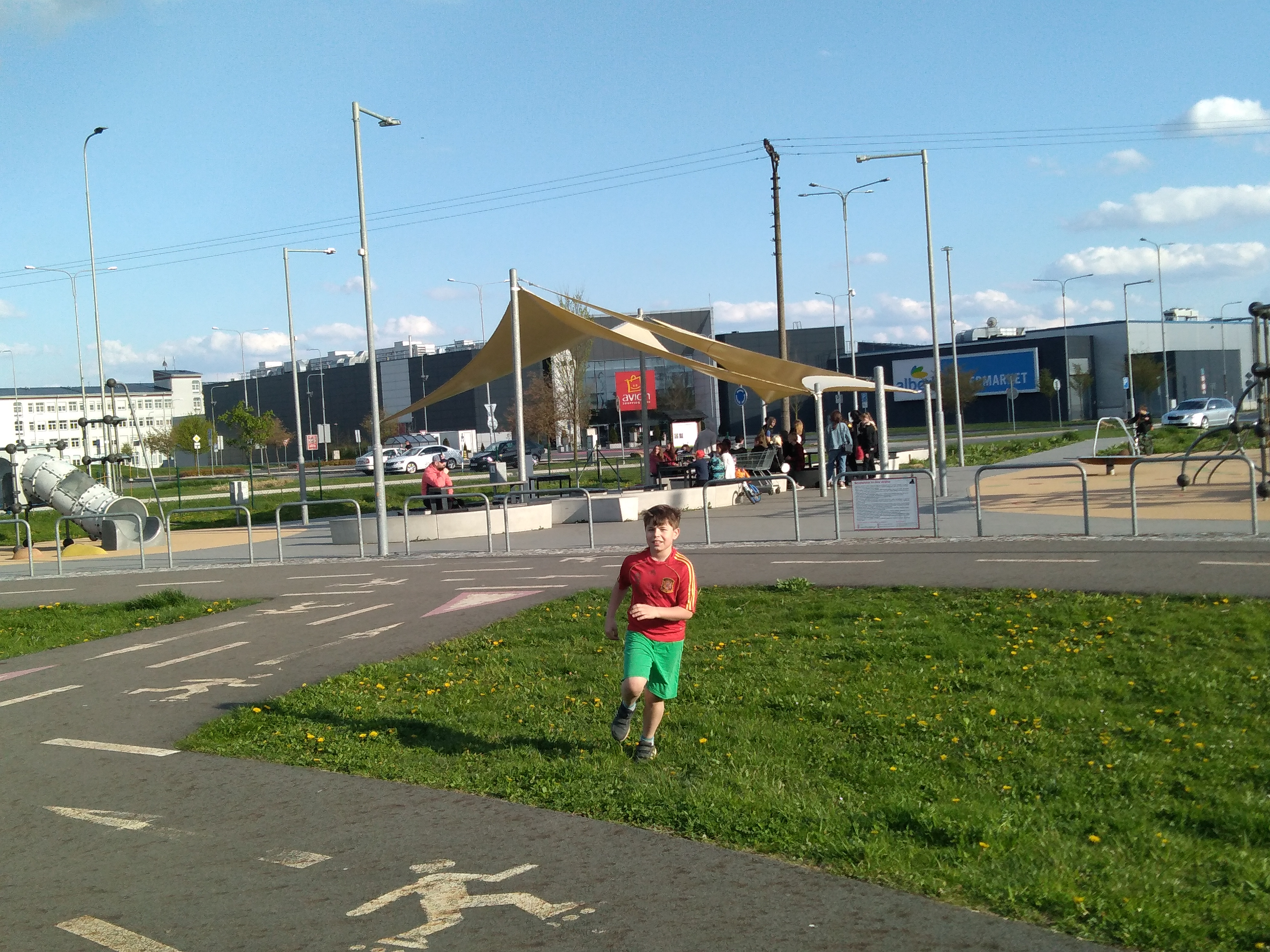
Nearby sports park with the centre in the background (2021)

The shopping centre has approximately 110,000 m² (1,184,000 sq ft) of leasable space and contains more than 150 stores. It is owned and managed by INGKA Centres and includes an IKEA store.
