= Albert Czech Republic =

Czech supermarket chain owned by Ahold Delhaize

Albert Česká republika

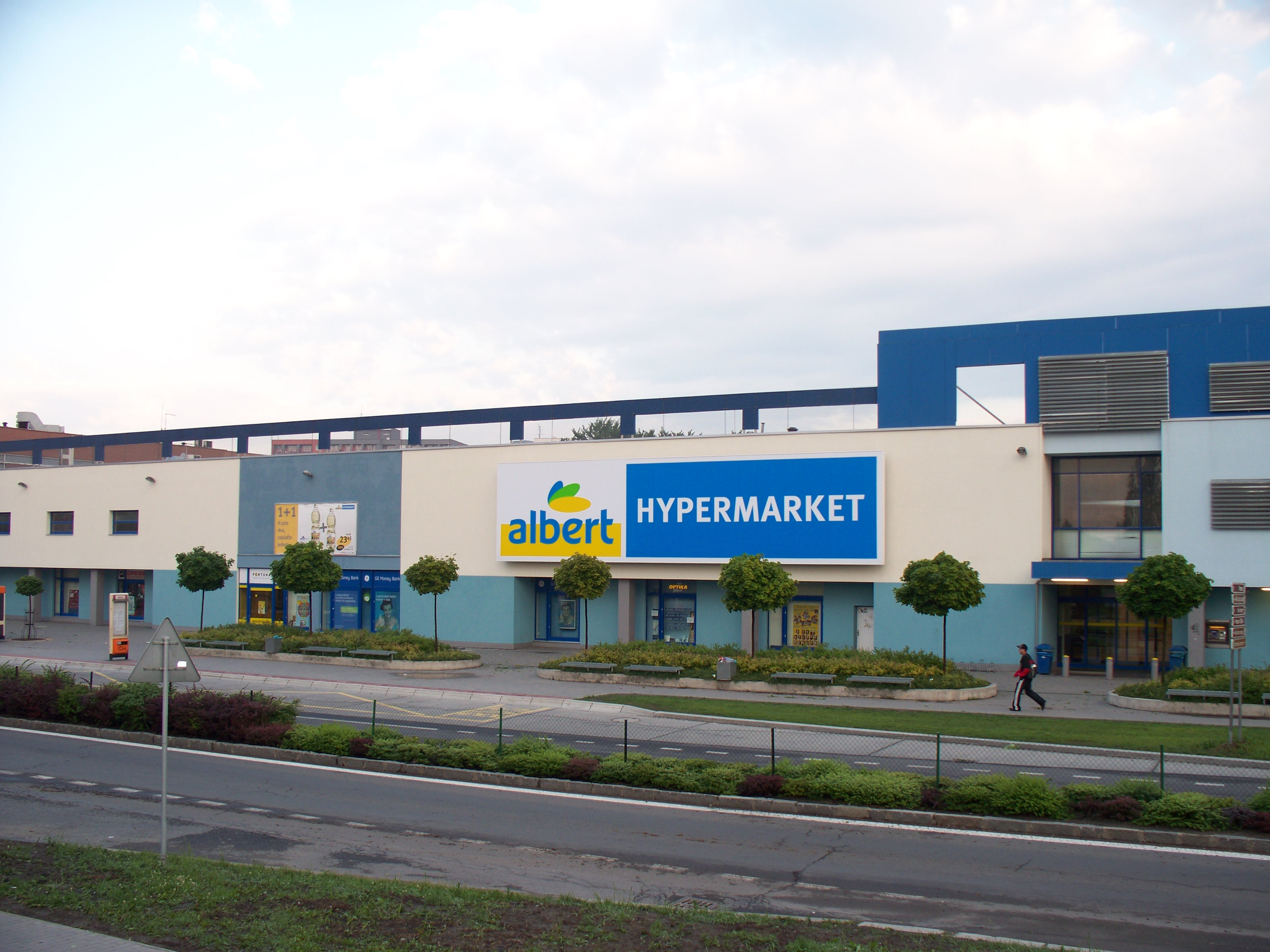
- An Albert hypermarket in Orlová, Czech Republic
- Trade name: Albert
- Industry: Retail
- Founded: Prague, Czech Republic (30 July 1991); First founded 1990
- Headquarters: Prague, Czech Republic
- Number of locations: 335 (2023)
- Area served: Czech Republic
- Services: Retail grocery: hypermarkets, supermarkets, convenience stores
- Revenue: 75,607,658,000 Czech koruna (2024)
- Operating income: 2,900,760,000 Czech koruna (2024)
- Net income: 2,022,584,000 Czech koruna (2024)
- Total assets: 23,240,176,000 Czech koruna (2024)
- Number of employees: 10,605 (2016)
- Parent: Ahold Delhaize
- Website: www.albert.cz

Albert Česká republika, s.r.o., is a subsidiary of the Netherlands-based Ahold Delhaize group, operating in the Czech Republic. The company (then known as Euronova a.s.) began trading in Czechoslovakia in 1990. Up until 2023 it operates the approximately 335 outlets forming the supermarket chain Albert.

== History ==
The company opened its first store in 1991, under the brand name Mana. This outlet, in Jihlava, was Czechoslovakia's first supermarket. One Albert store operated in Bratislava/Petržalka, Slovakia.

In 2005, Ahold took over 56 outlets of the Austrian-based Julius Meinl supermarket when the latter company left the Czech market, and remodelled them to conform to their Albert brand. In 2009, the company dropped the Hypernova brand, re-branding all hypermarket operations to the name Albert Hypermarket.

In March 2014 Ahold Czech Republic a.s. acquired 35 hypermarkets and 14 supermarkets from Spar for more than 5.2 billion Czech koruna. With this move Albert became and remains the Czech Republic's biggest supermarket chain in terms of outlets, with some 330 stores. The Prague TV guide mentioned in 2015 both the original pioneering and current outdatedness of the Albert stores.
