= Districts of Prague =

Administrative subdivisions of the Czech capital

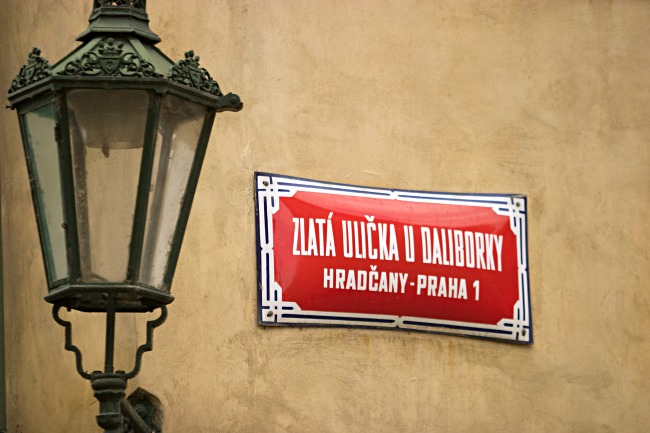
The writing on this Prague street sign indicates it is in the Hradčany cadastral area and in the municipal district Prague 1.

Prague has a local-government structure made up of two or three tiers, depending on the area of the city. At the top tier is the city hall of the capital city of Prague (Czech: Magistrát hlavního města Prahy), responsible for public transport, waste collection, municipal police, firefighting, ambulance services, cultural activities, care of historical sites, the Prague Zoo, and other activities of citywide significance.

Prague is divided into 10 municipal districts (1‍–‍10), 22 administrative districts (1‍–‍22), 57 municipal parts, or 112 cadastral areas.

Since 1992, the city has been divided into 57 (initially 56, from 1990) self-governing municipal parts (Czech: městské části). The parts are responsible for parks and environmental protection; ordering equipment for schools and volunteer firefighters; some cultural and sports activities; activities for seniors; some social and health programs; cemeteries; and collection of fees for dog tags and the like. Another important activity of the municipal parts is the ownership, maintenance and, sometimes, sale of public property, especially public housing.

Since 2001, the 57 municipal parts have been grouped into 22 numbered administrative districts (Czech: správní obvody) for national-government purposes. Each administrative district has responsibility for providing certain services for its municipal parts. Those services include providing business licenses, identity cards and passports. Some of the administrative districts with these responsibilities share their names with the municipal parts they serve; for example, the administrative district of Prague 19 provides these services to the municipal parts of Prague 19 (Kbely), Prague-Satalice and Prague-Vinoř. Residents of Satalice can get dog tags in their own neighborhood but must go to Kbely, home of the Prague 19 government, to get an identity card.

Both the citywide government and the municipal districts have elected councils and mayors. The mayor of the capital city of Prague (Czech: primátor) is sometimes translated into English as "lord mayor", although the title in Czech carries no connotations of nobility.

Since 1960, Prague has been divided into 10 municipal districts. Those 10 districts are still used for addresses and transportation purposes and, for example, the organisation of courts and prosecutions. Street name signs usually reflect the name of the municipal district, with the name of the cadastral area (Czech: katastrální území) appended. Thus, a sign in Kbely will say "Praha 9-Kbely," not "Praha 19". Prague residents are much more likely to use the name of a cadastral area in everyday communication, rather than the name of the administrative district.

== Administrative and municipal districts ==
Administrative districts and municipal parts of Prague

Municipal district	Administrative district	Municipal parts
Prague 1	Prague 1	Prague 1
Prague 2	Prague 2	Prague 2
Prague 3	Prague 3	Prague 3
Prague 4	Prague 4	Prague 4, Kunratice
Prague 4	Prague 11 (part)	Prague 11, Šeberov, Újezd u Průhonic
Prague 4	Prague 12	Prague 12, Libuš
Prague 5	Prague 5	Prague 5, Slivenec
Prague 5	Prague 13	Prague 13, Řeporyje
Prague 5	Prague 16	Prague 16 (formerly Radotín), Lipence, Lochkov, Velká Chuchle, Zbraslav
Prague 5	Prague 17 (part)	Zličín
Prague 6	Prague 6	Prague 6, Lysolaje, Nebušice, Přední Kopanina, Suchdol
Prague 6	Prague 17 (part)	Prague 17 (formerly Řepy)
Prague 7	Prague 7	Prague 7, Troja (has been a separate municipal district since 1 January 1992)
Prague 8	Prague 8	Prague 8, Březiněves, Dolní Chabry, Ďáblice
Prague 9	Prague 9	Prague 9
Prague 9	Prague 14	Prague 14, Dolní Počernice
Prague 9	Prague 18	Prague 18 (formerly Letňany), Čakovice (has been part of administrative district 18 since 2007)
Prague 9	Prague 19	Prague 19 (formerly Kbely), Satalice, Vinoř,
Prague 9	Prague 20	Prague 20 (formerly Horní Počernice)
Prague 9	Prague 21	Prague 21 (formerly Újezd nad Lesy), Běchovice, Klánovice, Koloděje
Prague 10	Prague 10	Prague 10
Prague 10	Prague 11 (part)	Křeslice
Prague 10	Prague 15	Prague 15, Dolní Měcholupy, Dubeč, Petrovice, Štěrboholy
Prague 10	Prague 22	Prague 22 (formerly Uhříněves), Benice, Kolovraty, Královice, Nedvězí

Notes:

- In 2001, the Czech government ordered that every municipal district that serves an entire administrative district should be named for the administrative district that it serves. Thus, the municipal districts of Radotín, Řepy, Letňany, Kbely, Horní Počernice, Újezd nad Lesy and Uhříněves are now Prague 16 through 22, respectively. The old names remain as the names of cadastral areas.
- All named districts officially begin with "Prague-", or "Praha-" in Czech. Thus, for example, the official name of Kunratice is "Prague-Kunratice" or "Praha-Kunratice".

== Cadastral areas ==
Map of administrative districts, municipal parts and cadastral areas

Name	Municipal district	Population	Area (km^{2)}	Density (per km^{2)}
Stodůlky	Prague 13, Prague-Řeporyje	60,758	9.62	6,315
Žižkov	Prague 3, Prague 8, Prague 10	58,267	5.44	10,710
Chodov	Prague 11	50,043	7.43	6,735
Vinohrady	Prague 1, Prague 2, Prague 3, Prague 4, Prague 10	48,805	3.79	12,877
Strašnice	Prague 3, Prague 10	37,665	6.18	6,094
Holešovice	Prague 1, Prague 7	37,664	4.69	8,030
Vršovice	Prague 10	36,836	2.93	12,572
Libeň	Prague 7, Prague 8, Prague 9	36,151	7.38	4,898
Záběhlice	Prague 4, Prague 10	35,228	5.69	6,202
Nusle	Prague 2, Prague 4	35,150	2.85	12,333
Smíchov	Prague 5	34,987	7.05	4,962
Modřany	Prague 12	33,574	7.69	4,365
Krč	Prague 4	27,344	5.21	5,248
Kobylisy	Prague 8	27,030	3.23	8,368
Břevnov	Prague 5, Prague 6	25,756	5.24	4,915
Hlubočepy	Prague 5	23,461	6.07	3,865
Dejvice	Prague 6	23,401	7.39	3,166
Černý Most	Prague 14	22,466	2.10	10,698
Řepy	Prague 17	22,461	3.25	6,889
Háje	Prague 11	22,059	2.36	9,347
Bubeneč	Prague 6, Prague 7	21,989	4.44	4,952
New Town	Prague 1, Prague 2, Prague 8	21,941	3.34	6,569
Letňany	Prague 18	21,702	5.61	3,868
Michle	Prague 4, Prague 10	21,402	5.51	3,884
Hostivař	Prague 15	19,161	8.00	2,395
Kamýk	Prague 12	19,129	2.54	7,531
Braník	Prague 4	17,777	4.40	4,040
Vysočany	Prague 3, Prague 9	17,465	6.07	2,877
Prosek	Prague 9	16,850	1.68	10,029
Bohnice	Prague 8	16,444	4.66	3,528
Košíře	Prague 5	16,145	3.23	4,998
Horní Měcholupy	Prague 15	16,006	2.25	7,113
Střížkov	Prague 8, Prague 9	15,705	2.03	7,736
Horní Počernice	Prague 20	15,303	16.94	902
Troja	Prague 7, Prague-Troja	14,304	5.43	2,634
Hloubětín	Prague 9, Prague 10, Prague 14	14,074	5.44	2,587
Podolí	Prague 4	13,611	2.38	5,718
Karlín	Prague 8	12,261	2.16	5,676
Malešice	Prague 9, Prague 10	11,237	3.82	2,941
Vokovice	Prague 6	11,083	3.52	3,148
Uhříněves	Prague 22	10,992	10.28	1,069
Újezd nad Lesy	Prague 21	10,429	10.15	1,027
Kunratice	Prague-Kunratice, Prague-Šeberov	10,091	8.10	1,245
Kyje	Prague 14	10,031	5.69	1,762
Zbraslav	Prague-Zbraslav	9,759	7.83	1,247
Čakovice	Prague-Čakovice	8,807	3.83	2,299
Radotín	Prague 16	8,462	9.30	908
Ruzyně	Prague 6	8,188	15.00	545
Zličín	Prague-Zličín	7,579	3.18	2,383
Jinonice	Prague 5, Prague 13	7,556	6.17	1,224
Kbely	Prague 19	7,216	6.00	1,204
Veleslavín	Prague 6	6,614	1.31	5,048
Střešovice	Prague 6	6,592	1.55	4,252
Čimice	Prague 8	6,586	2.58	2,552
Old Town	Prague 1	6,272	1.29	4,862
Suchdol	Prague-Suchdol	6,270	4.31	1,586
Petrovice	Prague-Petrovice	5,753	1.79	3,213
Lhotka	Prague 4	5,692	1.05	5,420
Libuš	Prague-Libuš	5,540	1.58	3,506
Dolní Chabry	Prague-Dolní Chabry	5,035	4.99	1,009
Liboc	Prague 6	4,980	4.25	1,171
Řeporyje	Prague 13, Prague-Řeporyje	4,729	5.66	835
Malá Strana	Prague 1, Prague 5	4,584	1.37	3,345
Vinoř	Prague-Vinoř	4,528	6.00	754
Písnice	Prague-Libuš	4,497	3.66	1,228
Dubeč	Prague-Dubeč	4,175	8.60	485
Dolní Měcholupy	Prague-Dolní Měcholupy	4,132	4.66	886
Motol	Prague 5	3,973	3.19	1,245
Hodkovičky	Prague 4	3,956	2.08	1,901
Újezd u Průhonic	Prague-Újezd	3,829	3.70	1,034
Hostavice	Prague 14	3,800	1.98	1,919
Ďáblice	Prague-Ďáblice	3,750	7.38	508
Kolovraty	Prague-Kolovraty	3,643	5.92	606
Slivenec	Prague-Slivenec	3,536	5.66	706
Klánovice	Prague-Klánovice	3,511	5.89	902
Šeberov	Prague-Šeberov	3,179	5.00	635
Lipence	Prague-Lipence	2,970	8.25	360
Hrdlořezy	Prague 9, Prague 10	2,912	1.96	1,485
Dolní Počernice	Prague-Dolní Počernice	2,802	5.76	486
Nebušice	Prague-Nebušice	2,734	3.68	742
Velká Chuchle	Prague-Velká Chuchle	2,538	4.61	550
Štěrboholy	Prague-Štěrboholy	2,464	2.97	829
Běchovice	Prague-Běchovice	2,414	6.83	353
Satalice	Prague-Satalice	2,388	3.80	628
Pitkovice	Prague 22	2,208	2.40	920
Radlice	Prague 5	1,952	2.42	806
Komořany	Prague 12	1,885	2.08	906
Březiněves	Prague-Březiněves	1,821	3.38	537
Miškovice	Prague-Čakovice	1,786	2.67	668
Hradčany	Prague 1, Prague 6	1,774	1.51	1,174
Vyšehrad	Prague 2	1,651	0.36	4,586
Koloděje	Prague-Koloděje	1,626	3.76	434
Lysolaje	Prague-Lysolaje	1,484	2.48	598
Třeboradice	Prague-Čakovice	1,391	3.69	376
Křeslice	Prague-Křeslice	1,173	3.44	340
Cholupice	Prague 12	1,133	6.39	177
Josefov	Prague 1	977	0.09	10,855
Sedlec	Prague 6	895	1.46	613
Lochkov	Prague-Lochkov	874	2.72	321
Točná	Prague 12	870	4.63	187
Benice	Prague-Benice	729	2.77	263
Hájek u Uhříněvsi	Prague 22	703	2.95	238
Sobín	Prague-Zličín	677	3.02	224
Třebonice	Prague 13, Prague-Řeporyje, Prague-Zličín	651	4.58	142
Přední Kopanina	Prague-Přední Kopanina	628	3.27	192
Holyně	Prague-Slivenec	463	1.93	239
Královice	Prague-Královice	438	4.96	88
Lahovice	Prague-Zbraslav	381	2.03	187
Nedvězí u Říčan	Prague-Nedvězí	366	3.81	96
Lipany	Prague-Kolovraty	301	0.58	518
Malá Chuchle	Prague-Velká Chuchle	289	1.42	203
Zadní Kopanina	Prague-Řeporyje	123	3.50	35

== Other areas ==
Beyond the 111 cadastral areas named above, many other Prague settlements, quarters and housing estates are perceived as districts, although they do not constitute their own cadastral areas. Examples: Barrandov, Spořilov, Sídliště Košík, Zahradní Město, Pankrác, Letná, Bubny, Zlíchov, Klíčov, Butovice, Klukovice, Kačerov, Jenerálka, Šárka, Strahov, Chodovec, Litochleby, Dubeček, Lázeňka, Netluky, Zmrzlík, Cikánka, Kateřinky, Hrnčíře, Pitkovičky, Lahovičky, Dolní Černošice, Kazín, Závist, Baně, Strnady, and many others.

The biggest panelák complexes are Jižní Město ("South City"), Severní Město ("North City") and Jihozápadní Město ("Southwest City"), all of which consist of partial housing estates. Most of Prague's panelák estates that were built between the 1960s and 1980s have names that incorporate the Czech word sídliště, which refers to a post-World War 2 eastern bloc housing estate. Many local names originated from names of historic villages in today's Prague area.

== Symbols ==
=== Flags ===
Prague 1

Prague 2

Prague 3

Prague 4

Prague 5

Prague 6

Prague 7

Prague 8

Prague 9

Prague 10

Prague 11

Prague 12

Prague 13

Prague 14

Prague 15

Prague 16

Prague 17

Prague 18

Prague 19

Prague 20

Prague 21

Prague 22

=== Coats of arms ===
Prague 1

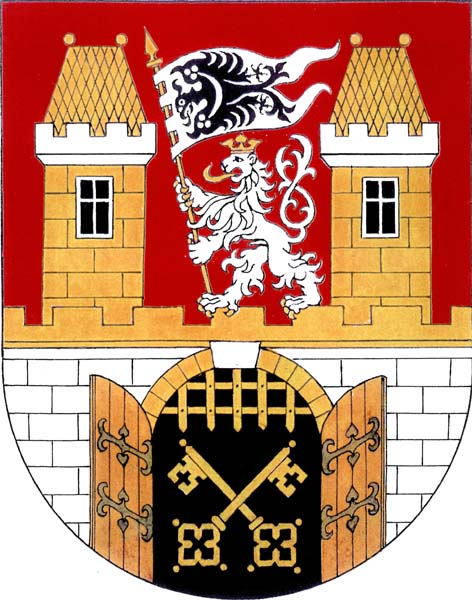
Prague 2

Prague 3

Prague 4

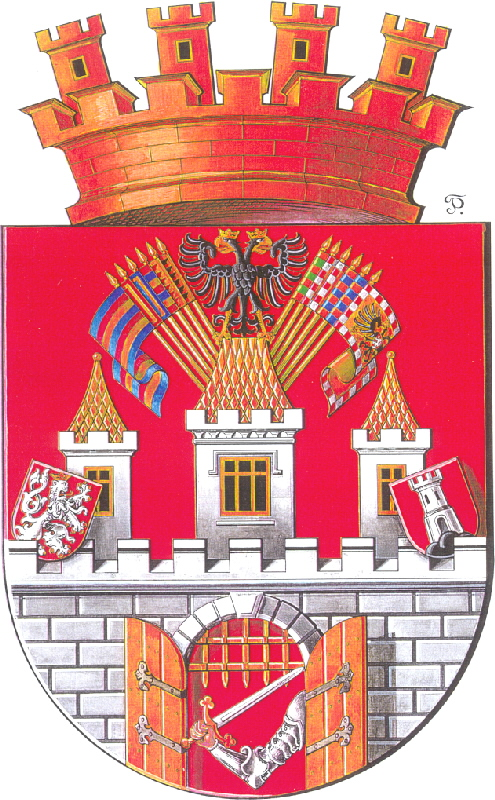
Prague 5

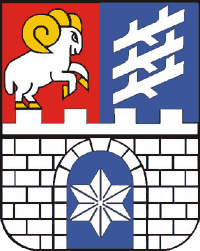
Prague 6

Prague 7

Prague 8

Prague 9

Prague 10

Prague 11

Prague 12

Prague 13

Prague 14

Prague 15

Prague 16

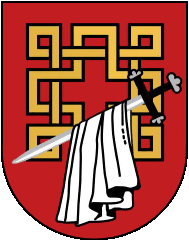
Prague 17

Prague 18

Prague 19

Prague 20

Prague 21

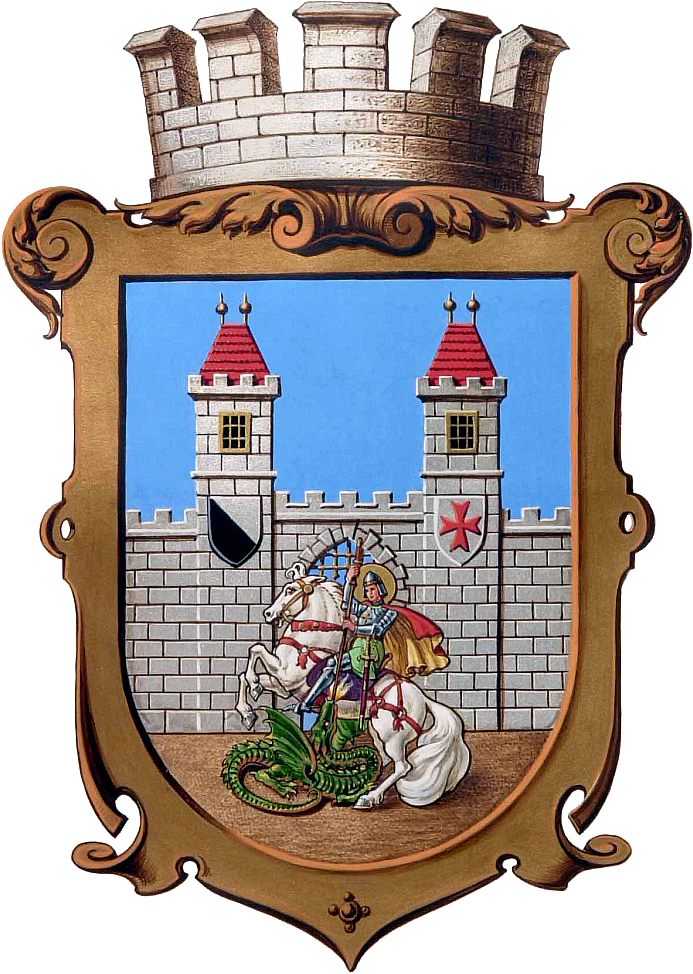
Prague 22

== See also ==
- ISO 3166-2:CZ, ISO subdivisions codes for the Czech Republic (include codes for districts of Prague)
