= Prague-Šeberov =

Praha-Šeberov
- Municipal District of Prague
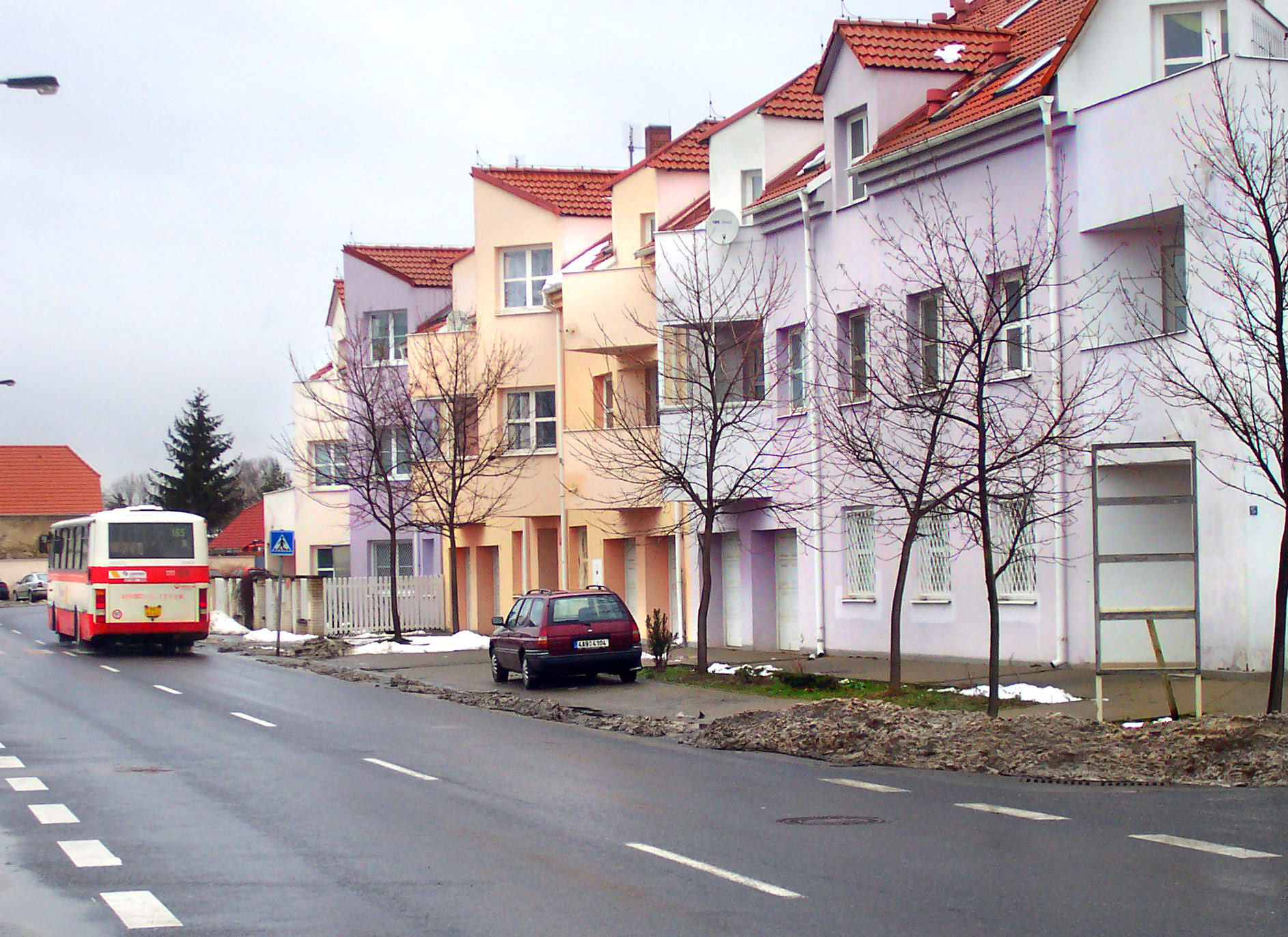
- Street in Prague-Šeberov

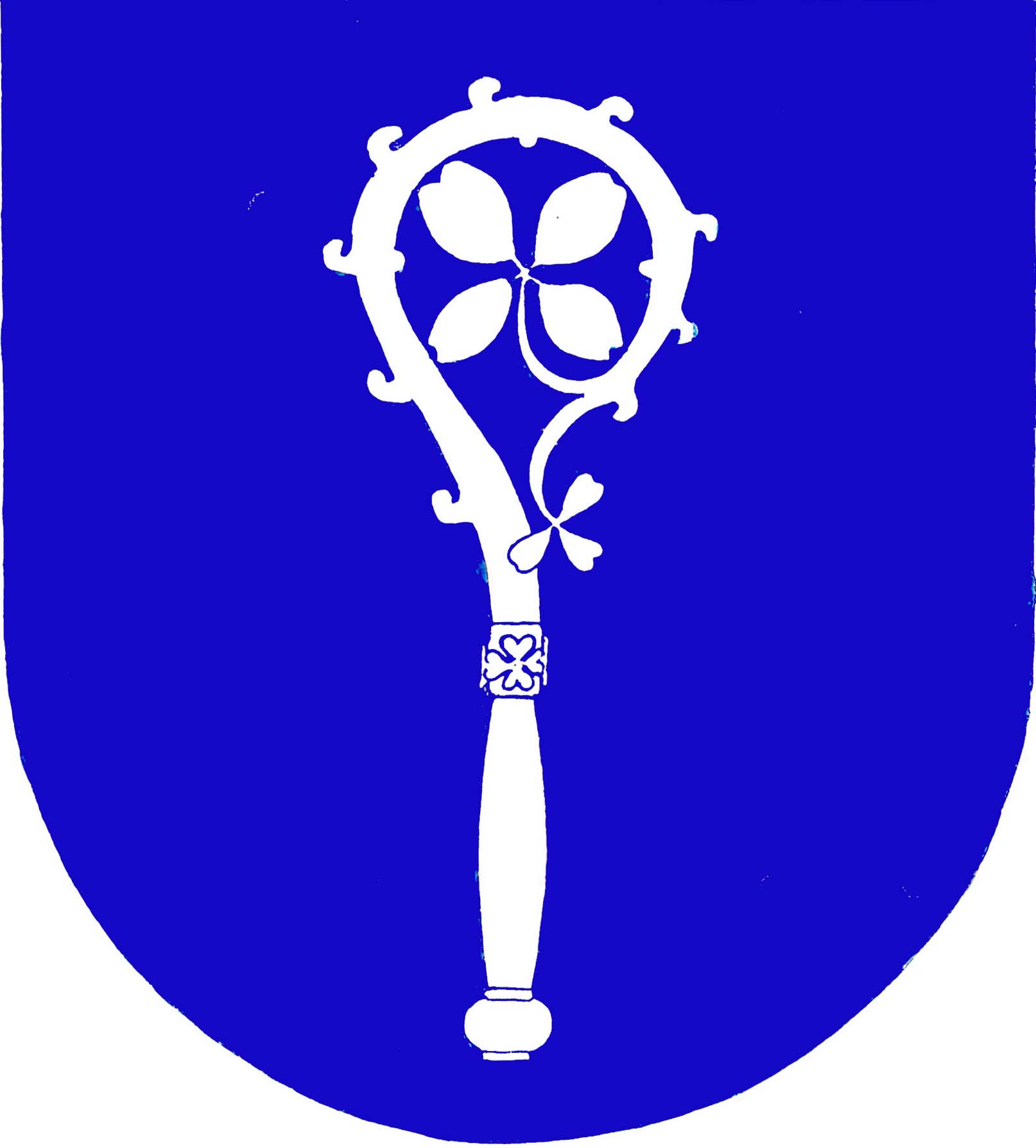
- Flag Coat of arms

- Location of Prague-Šeberov in Prague
- Coordinates: 50.007876°N 14.513987°E
- Country: Czech Republic
- Region: Prague
- Administrative district: Prague 11
- Municipal district: Prague 4

Area
  - Total: 4.99 km^{2} (1.93 sq mi)

Population (2021)
  - Total: 3,179
  - Density: 637/km^{2} (1,650/sq mi)
- Time zone: UTC+1 (CET)
  - Summer (DST): UTC+2 (CEST)
- Postal code: 149 00

Prague-Šeberov is a district in Prague, Czech Republic. It is situated in the southern part of the city, in the administrative district Prague 11. The cadastral area Šeberov is part of this district.
