= Třeboradice =

- Cadastral area of Prague
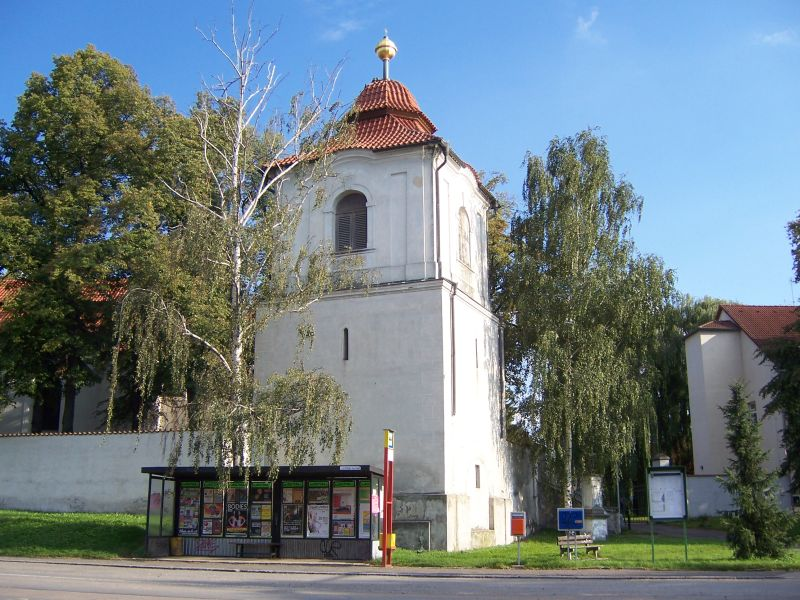
- Church of the Assumption of the Virgin Mary

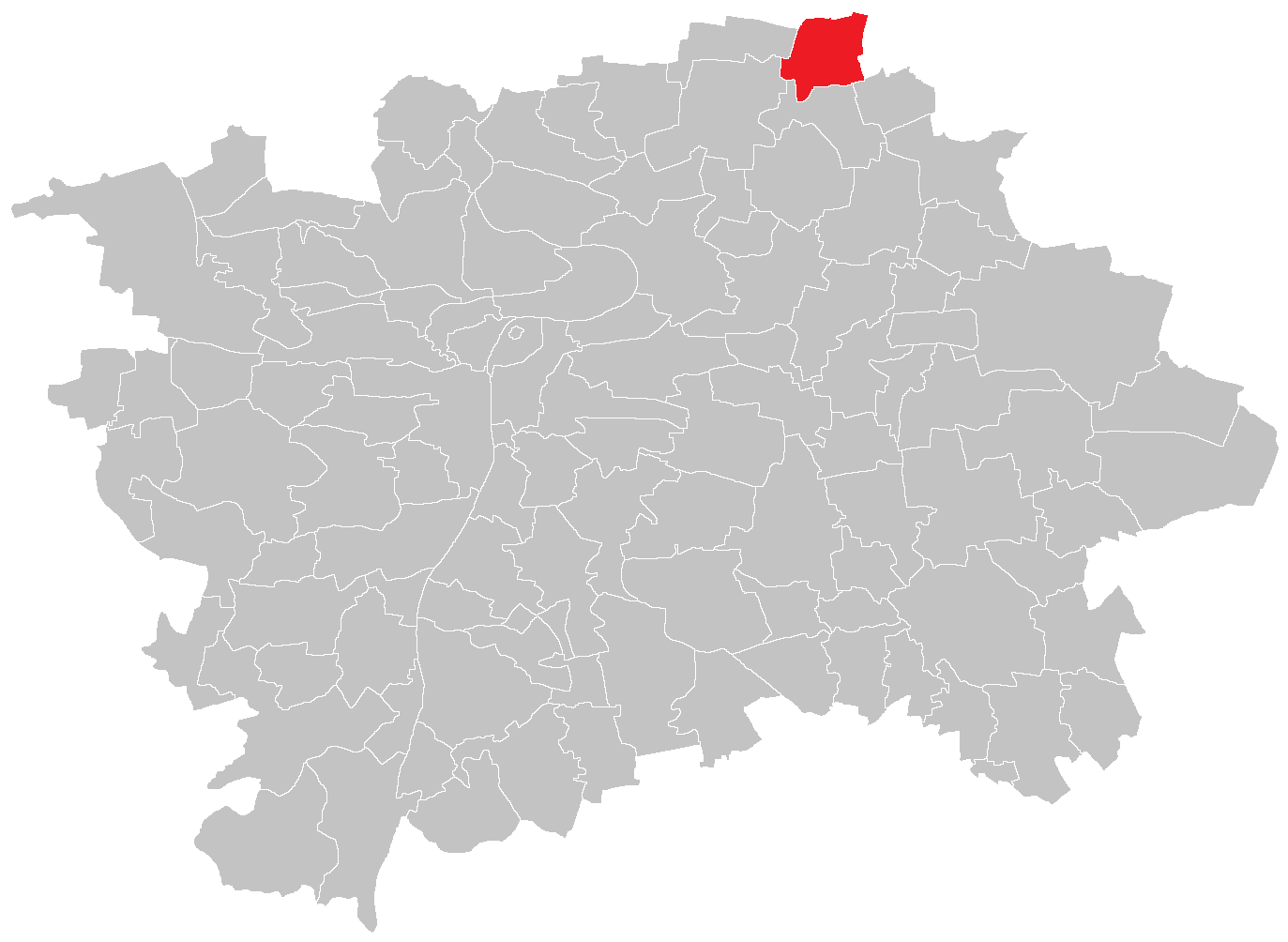
- Location of Třeboradice in Prague
- Coordinates: 50°09′46″N 14°31′28″E
- Country: Czech Republic
- Region: Prague
- District: Prague-Čakovice

Area
  - Total: 3.69 km^{2} (1.42 sq mi)

Population (2021)
  - Total: 1,391
  - Density: 377/km^{2} (976/sq mi)
- Time zone: UTC+1 (CET)
  - Summer (DST): UTC+2 (CEST)

Třeboradice is a cadastral district in the municipal part of Čakovice in the administrative district of Prague 18 in Prague, Czech Republic. It has about 1,400 inhabitants.

== Demographics ==
Historical population

Year	Pop.	±%
1869	229	—
1880	222	−3.1%
1890	280	+26.1%
1900	326	+16.4%
1910	323	−0.9%
1921	330	+2.2%
1930	578	+75.2%
1950	645	+11.6%

Year	Pop.	±%
1961	635	−1.6%
1970	787	+23.9%
1980	731	−7.1%
1991	675	−7.7%
2001	682	+1.0%
2011	1,061	+55.6%
2021	1,391	+31.1%

Source: Censuses

== Sport ==
SK Třeboradice - football club

== Timeline of important moments in Prague history ==
- 1120 Třeboradice founded as Třeboratice
- 1968 Třeboradice enclosed to Prague
- 2006 Started construction of urban settlement
- 2007 SK Třeboradice won Prague's league called "II. B třída"
