= Hodkovičky =

- Cadastral Area of Prague
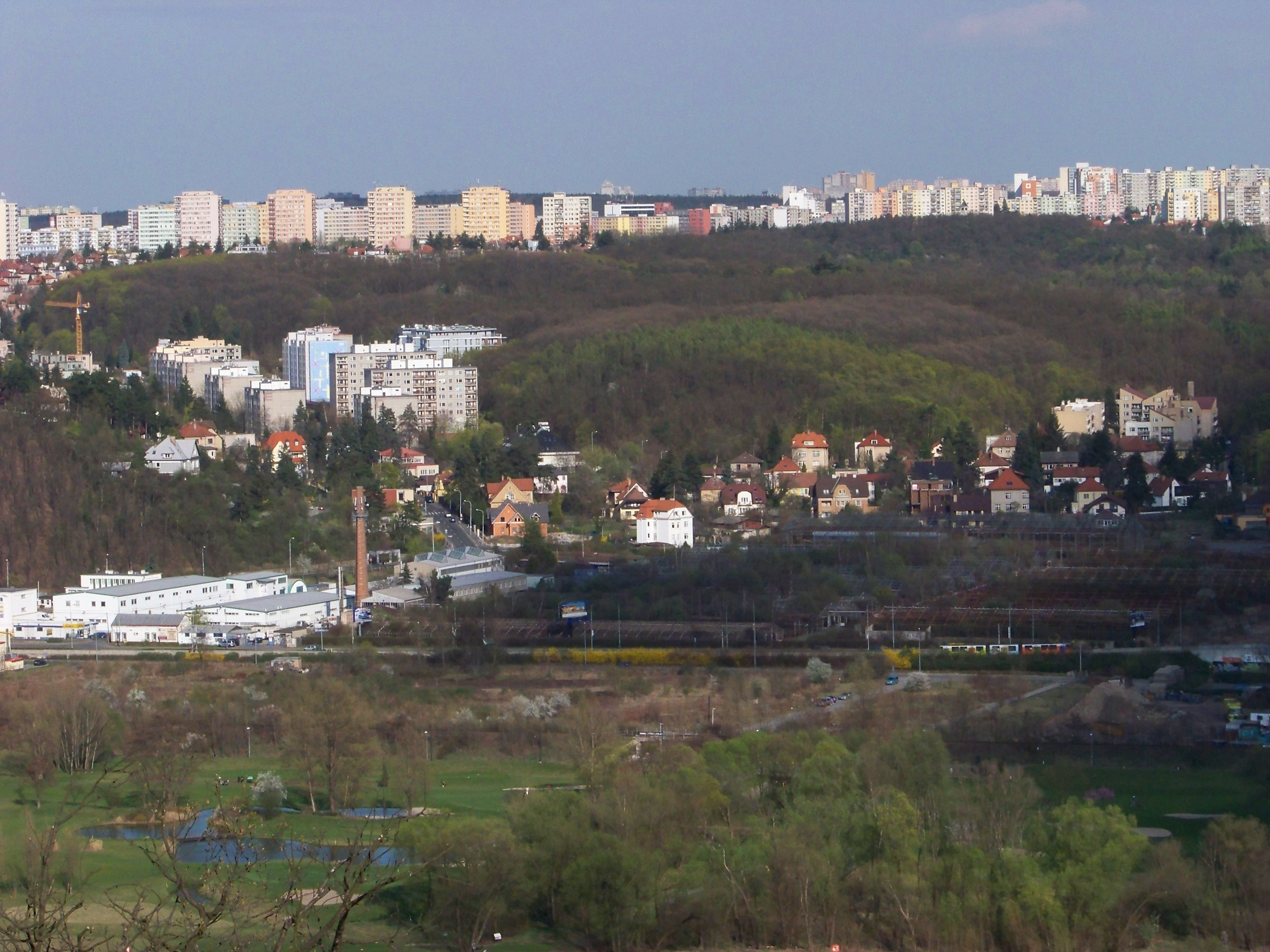
- View of Hodkovičky

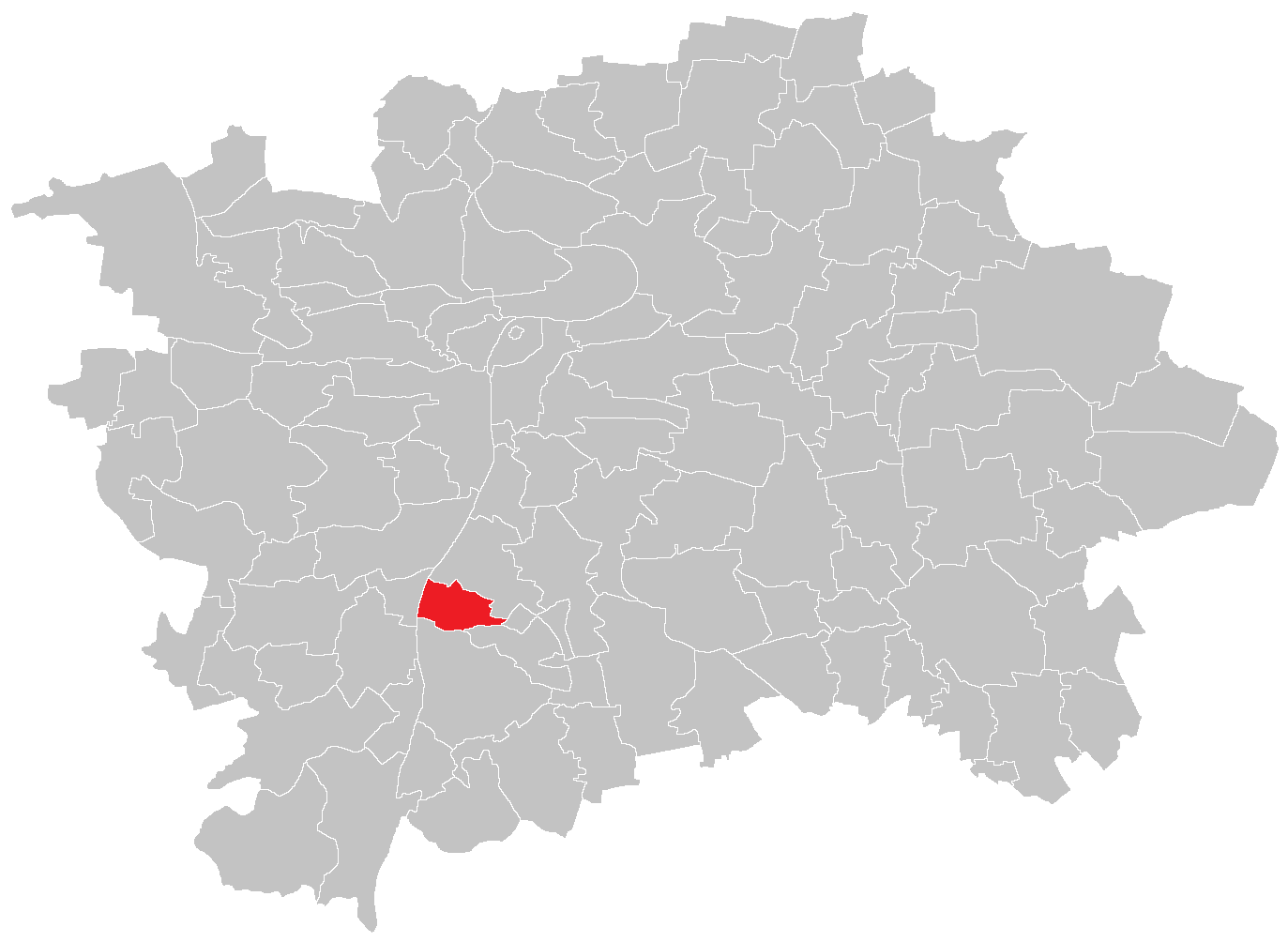
- Location of Hodkovičky in Prague
- Coordinates: 50°1′10″N 14°24′35″E
- Country: Czech Republic
- Region: Prague
- District: Prague 4

Area
  - Total: 2.08 km^{2} (0.80 sq mi)

Population (2021)
  - Total: 3,956
  - Density: 1,900/km^{2} (4,930/sq mi)
- Time zone: UTC+1 (CET)
  - Summer (DST): UTC+2 (CEST)
- Postal code: 155 00

Hodkovičky is a cadastral district of Prague, Czech Republic. It is located in the district of Prague 4. In 2021 it had 3,956 inhabitants.

== Demographics ==
Historical population

Year	Pop.	±%
1869	155	—
1880	194	+25.2%
1890	270	+39.2%
1900	346	+28.1%
1910	461	+33.2%
1921	711	+54.2%
1930	1,089	+53.2%
1950	2,224	+104.2%

Year	Pop.	±%
1961	2,176	−2.2%
1970	2,657	+22.1%
1980	2,766	+4.1%
1991	2,482	−10.3%
2001	3,366	+35.6%
2011	3,708	+10.2%
2021	3,956	+6.7%

Source: Censuses
