= Lipany (Prague) =

- Cadastral Area of Prague
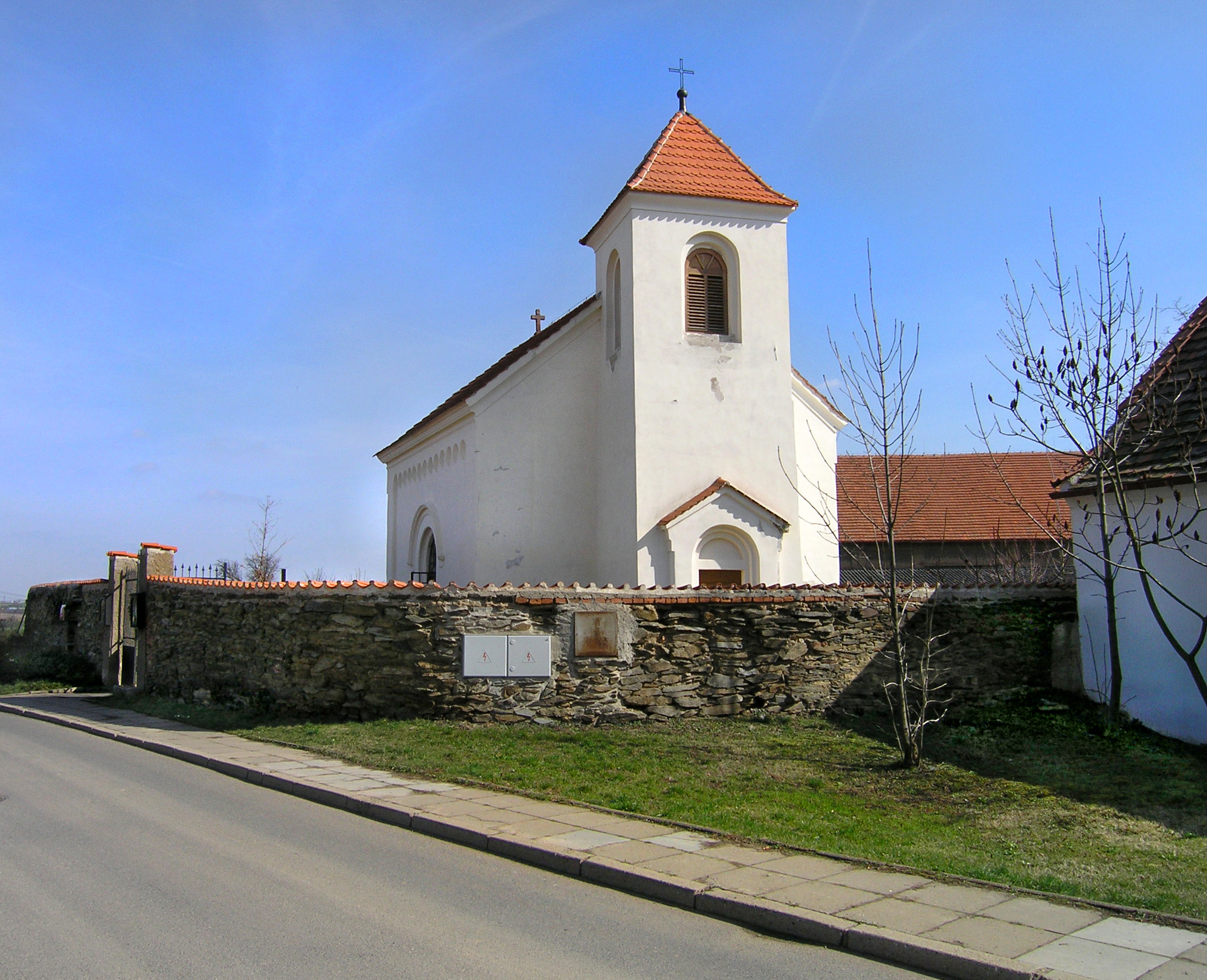
- Church in Lipany

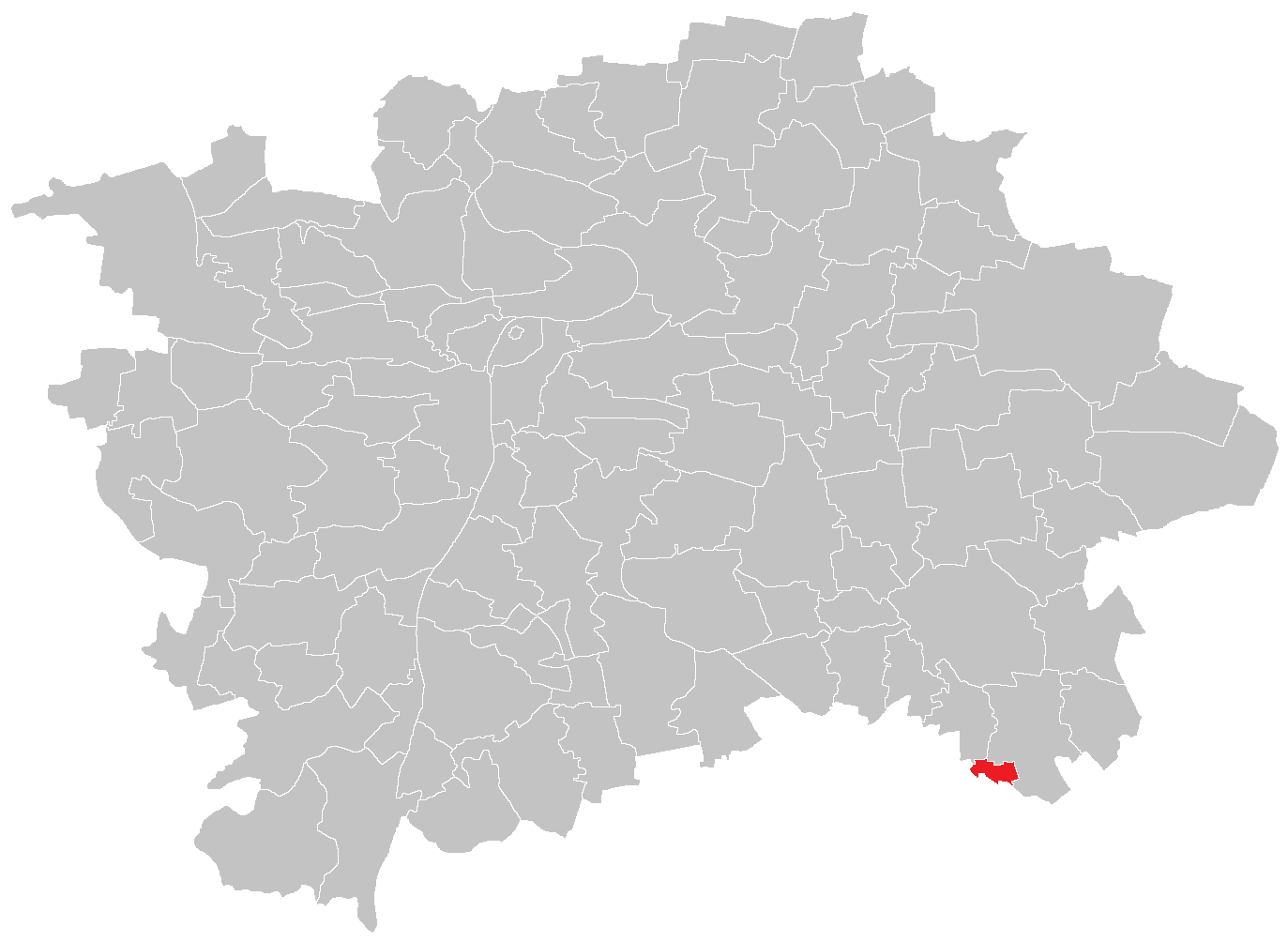
- Location of Lipany in Prague
- Coordinates: 49°59′57″N 14°37′3″E
- Country: Czech Republic
- Region: Prague
- District: Prague-Kolovraty

Area
  - Total: 0.58 km^{2} (0.22 sq mi)

Population (2021)
  - Total: 301
  - Density: 520/km^{2} (1,300/sq mi)
- Time zone: UTC+1 (CET)
  - Summer (DST): UTC+2 (CEST)
- Postal code: 103 00

Lipany is a cadastral district of Prague, Czech Republic. It has about 300 inhabitants.

== Demographics ==
Historical population

| Year | Pop. | ±% |
|---|---|---|
| 1869 | 58 | — |
| 1880 | 67 | +15.5% |
| 1890 | 76 | +13.4% |
| 1900 | 98 | +28.9% |
| 1910 | 113 | +15.3% |
| 1921 | 116 | +2.7% |
| 1930 | 233 | +100.9% |
| 1950 | 152 | −34.8% |

| Year | Pop. | ±% |
|---|---|---|
| 1961 | 140 | −7.9% |
| 1970 | 129 | −7.9% |
| 1980 | 102 | −20.9% |
| 1991 | 89 | −12.7% |
| 2001 | 92 | +3.4% |
| 2011 | 277 | +201.1% |
| 2021 | 301 | +8.7% |

Source: Censuses
