= Královice (Prague) =

Municipal District in Czechia

- Municipal District of Prague
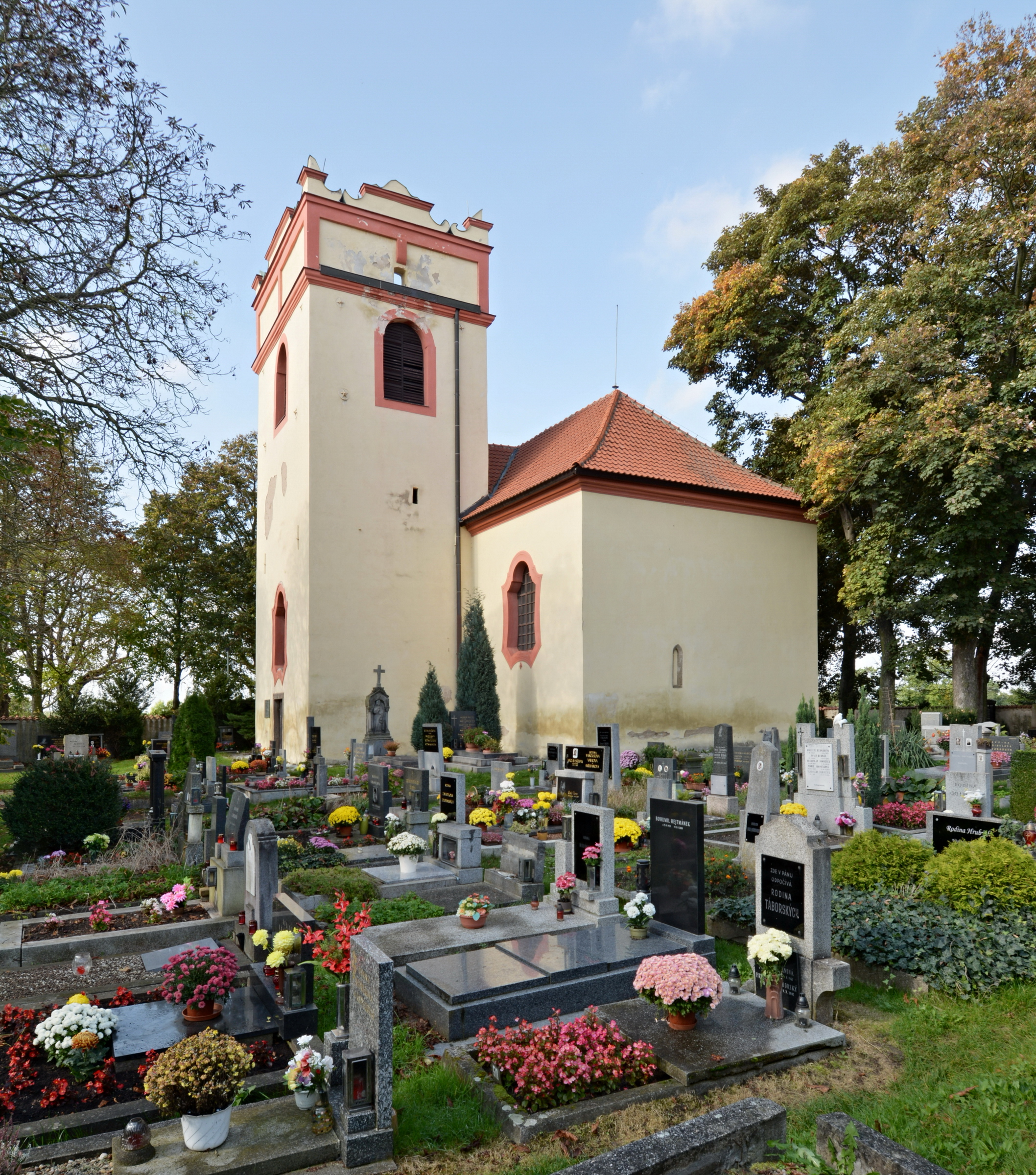
- Church of Saint Margaret

- Flag Coat of arms
- Interactive map of Královice
- Coordinates: 50°2′17.02″N 14°38′9.81″E
- Country: Czech Republic
- Region: Prague
- District: Prague 22

Population (2021)
  - Total: 438
- Time zone: UTC+1 (CET)
  - Summer (DST): UTC+2 (CEST)

Královice is a municipal district (městská část) in Prague, Czech Republic.

== Demographics ==
The population is 438 as of 2021, a 37% increase from 2011.

Historical population
| Year | Pop. | ±% |
|---|---|---|
| 1869 | 384 | — |
| 1880 | 409 | +6.5% |
| 1890 | 454 | +11.0% |
| 1900 | 452 | −0.4% |
| 1910 | 511 | +13.1% |
| 1921 | 494 | −3.3% |
| 1930 | 531 | +7.5% |
| 1950 | 395 | −25.6% |
| 1961 | 378 | −4.3% |
| 1970 | 347 | −8.2% |
| 1980 | 305 | −12.1% |
| 1991 | 290 | −4.9% |
| 2001 | 263 | −9.3% |
| 2011 | 318 | +20.9% |
| 2021 | 438 | +37.7% |
Source: Censuses
