= Hájek (Prague) =

- Cadastral Area of Prague
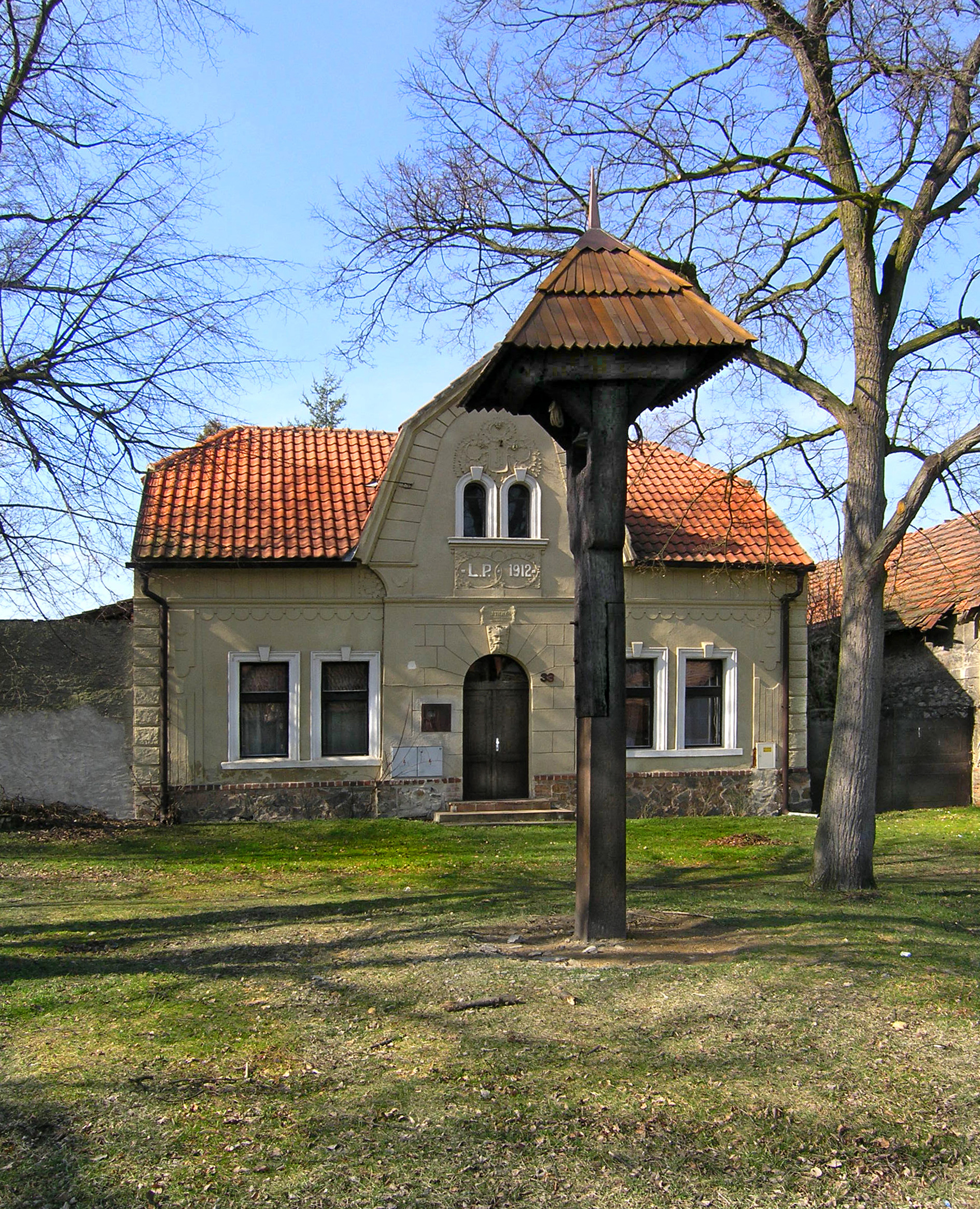
- Belfry in Hájek

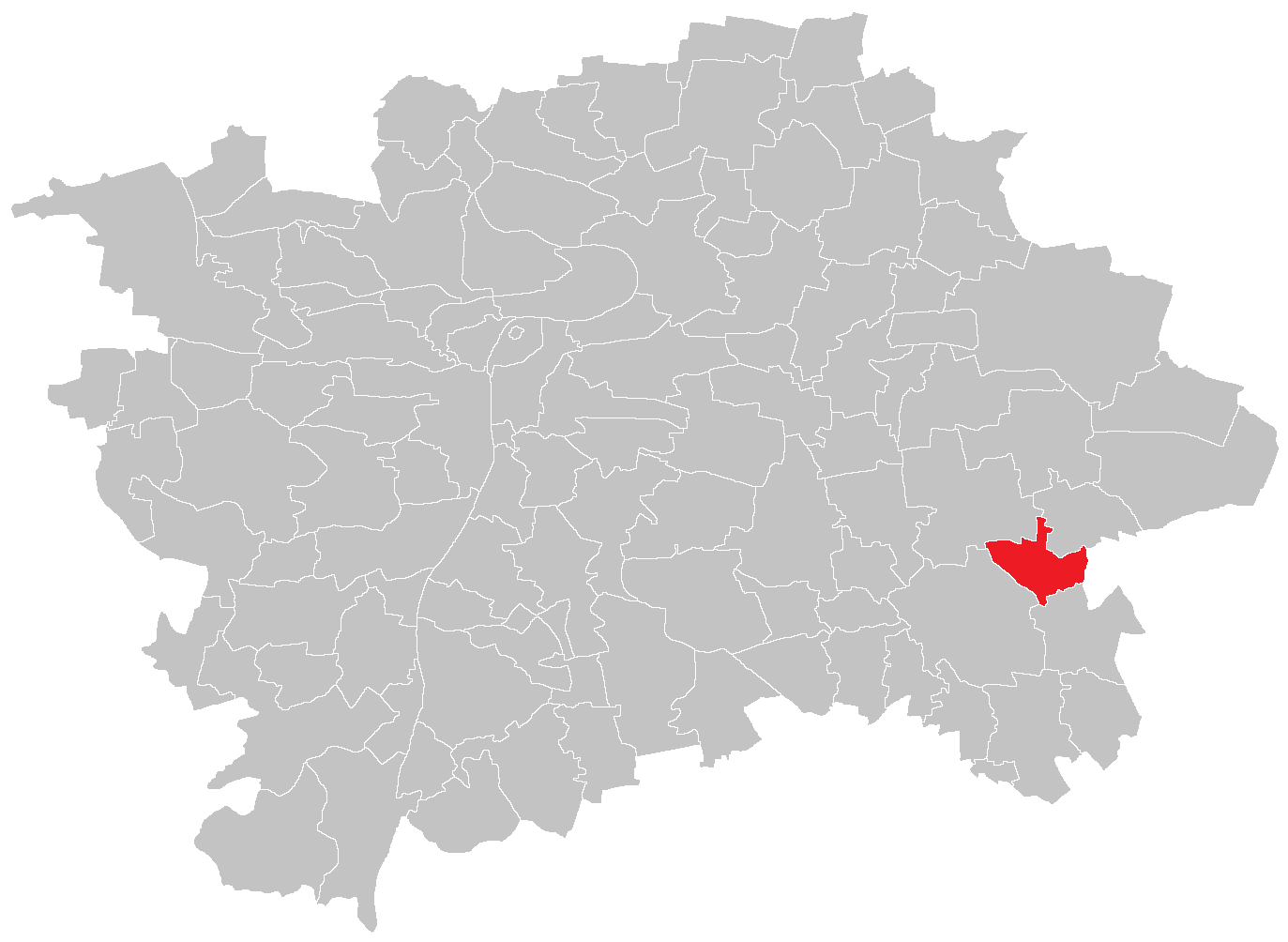
- Location of Hájek in Prague
- Coordinates: 50°3′6″N 14°37′40″E
- Country: Czech Republic
- Region: Prague
- District: Prague 22

Area
  - Total: 2.95 km^{2} (1.14 sq mi)

Population (2021)
  - Total: 703
  - Density: 238/km^{2} (617/sq mi)
- Time zone: UTC+1 (CET)
  - Summer (DST): UTC+2 (CEST)
- Postal code: 104 00

Hájek (full name Hájek u Uhřiněvsi) is a cadastral district of Prague, Czech Republic. It has about 700 inhabitants.

== Demographics ==
Historical population

Year	Pop.	±%
1869	148	—
1880	158	+6.8%
1890	180	+13.9%
1900	160	−11.1%
1910	193	+20.6%
1921	169	−12.4%
1930	235	+39.1%
1950	205	−12.8%

Year	Pop.	±%
1961	228	+11.2%
1970	241	+5.7%
1980	278	+15.4%
1991	245	−11.9%
2001	289	+18.0%
2011	463	+60.2%
2021	703	+51.8%

Source: Censuses
