= Prague-Zličín =

- Municipal District of Prague
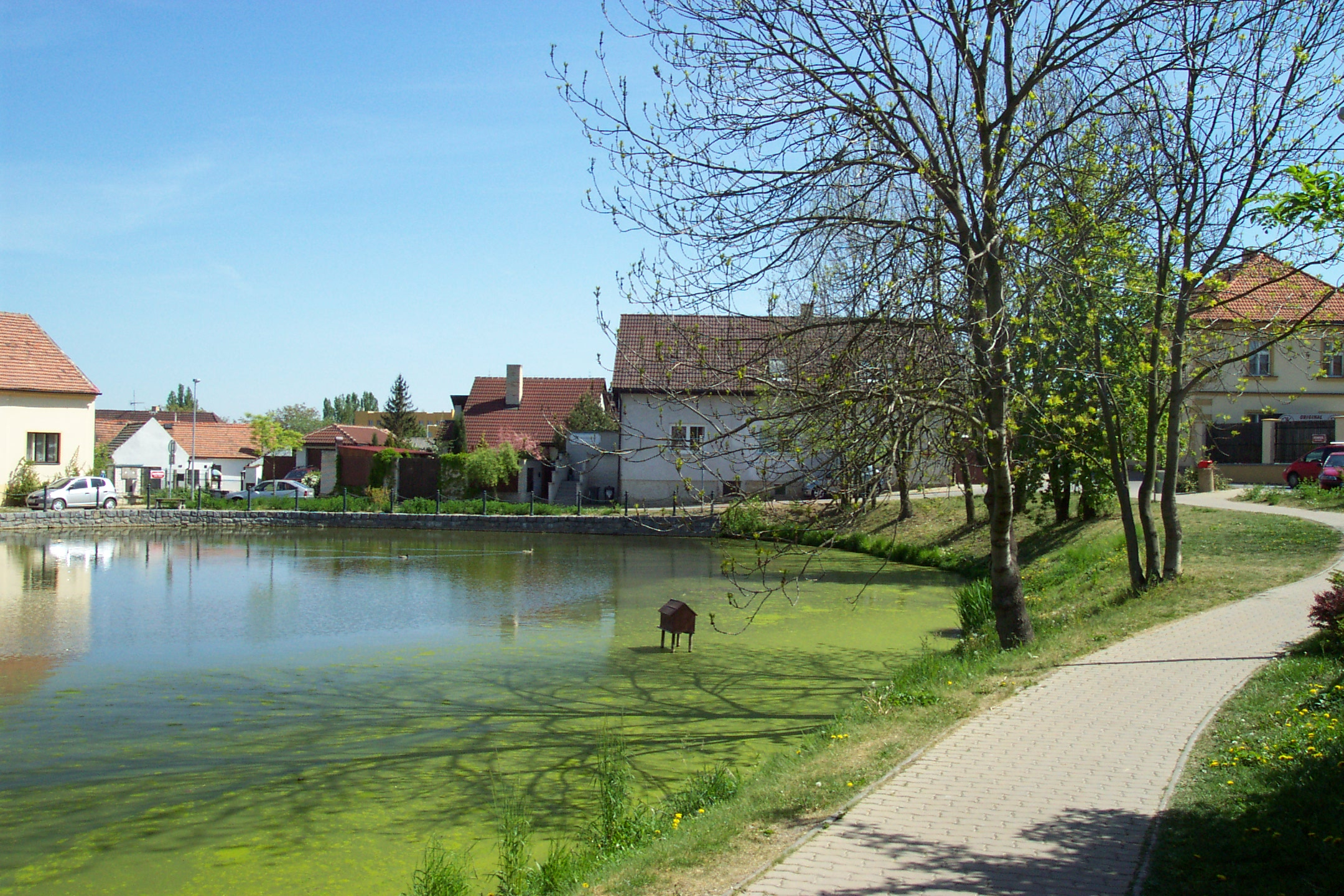
- Pond in Prague-Zličín

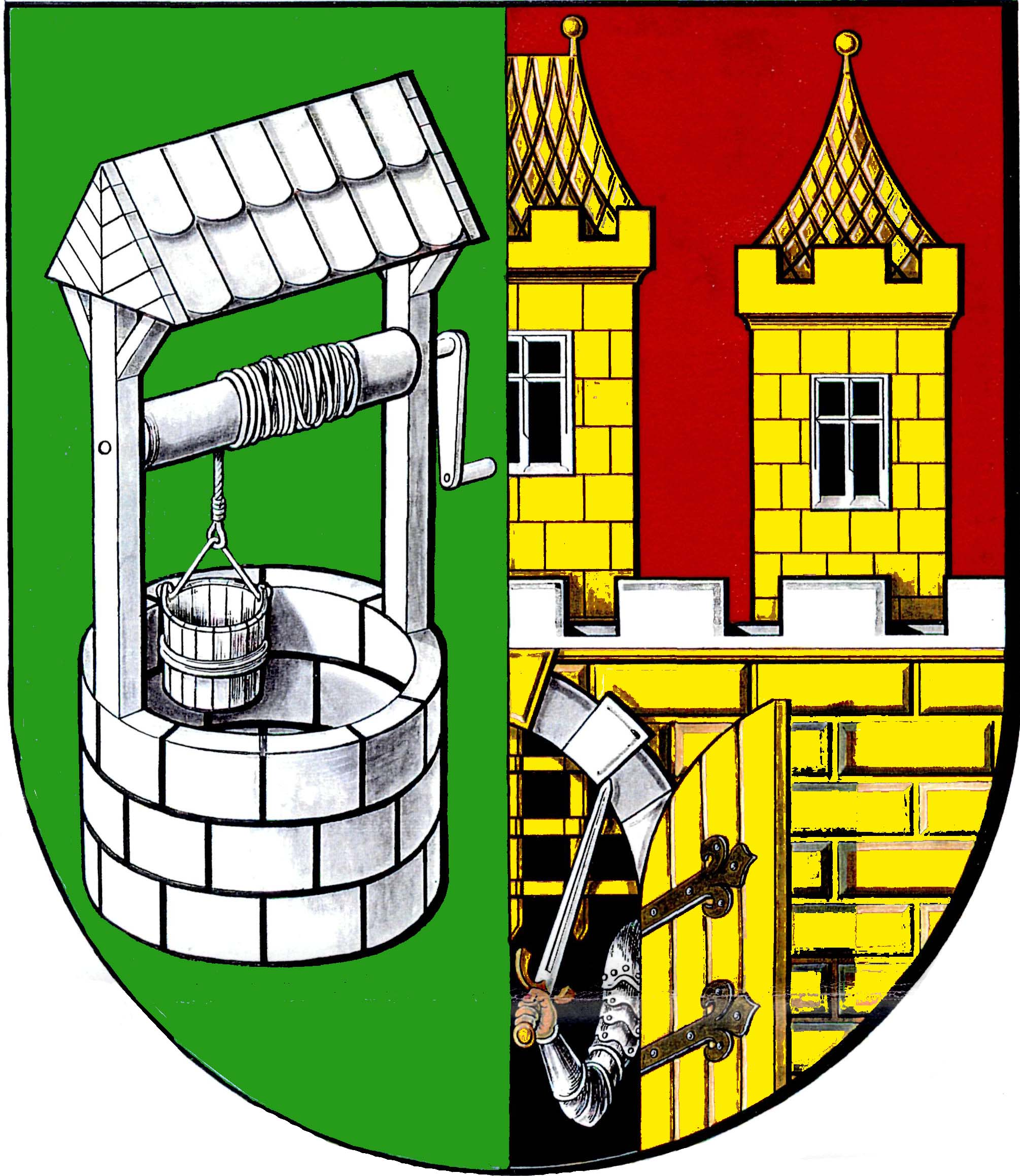
- Flag Coat of arms

- Location of Prague-Zličín in Prague
- Coordinates: 50.061667°N 14.278333°E
- Country: Czech Republic
- Region: Prague
- Administrative district: Prague 17
- Municipal district: Prague 5

Area
  - Total: 7.20 km^{2} (2.78 sq mi)

Population (2021)
  - Total: 8,398
  - Density: 1,170/km^{2} (3,020/sq mi)
- Time zone: UTC+1 (CET)
  - Summer (DST): UTC+2 (CEST)
- Postal code: 155 00

Prague-Zličín is a district in Prague, Czech Republic. It is situated in the southern part of the city, in the administrative district Prague 17. The cadastral area Zličín is part of this district.
