= Kolovraty =

- Municipal District of Prague
- Prague-Kolovraty
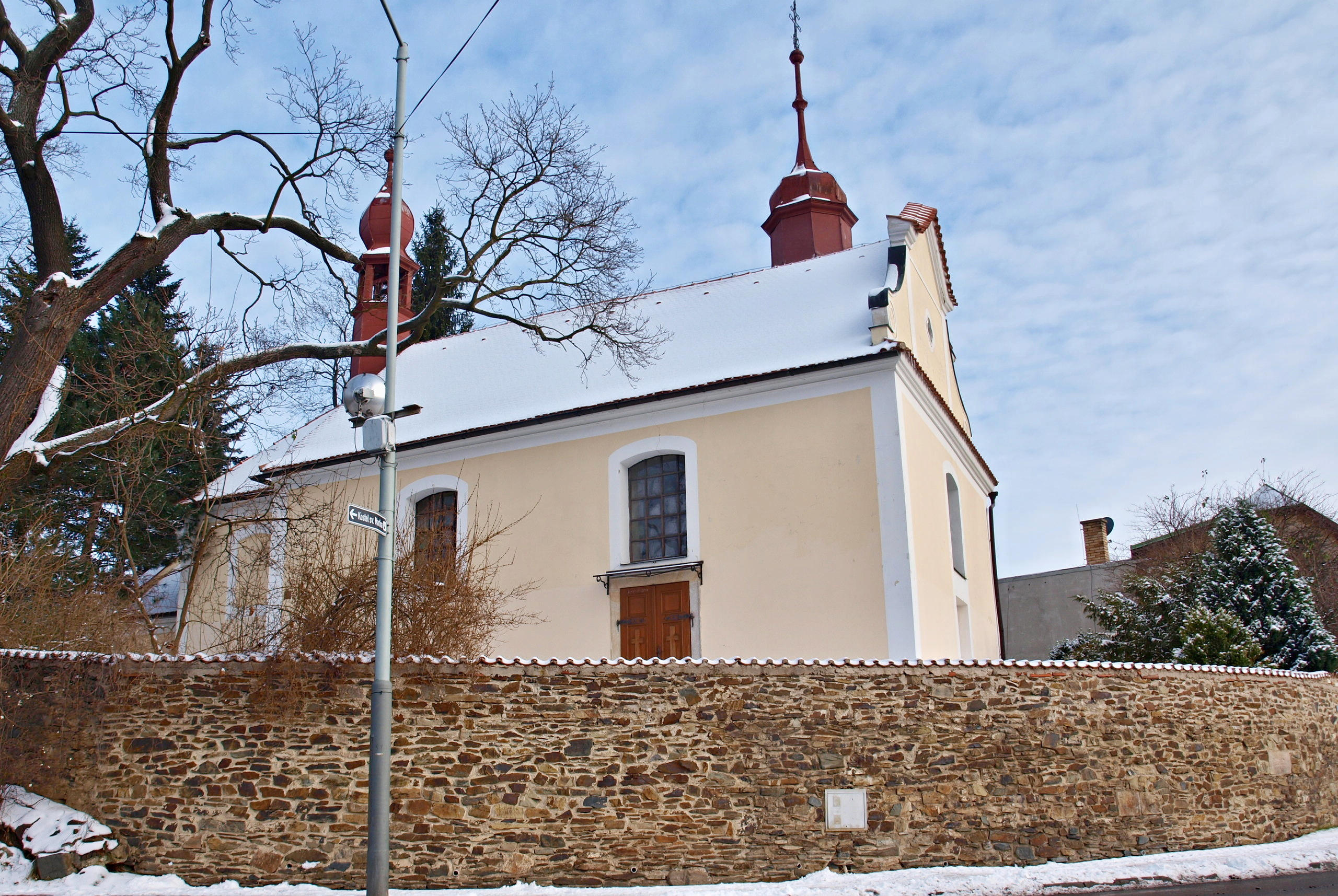
- Church of Saint Andrew

- Flag Coat of arms
- Interactive map of Kolovraty
- Coordinates: 50°0′40″N 14°37′38″E
- Country: Czech Republic
- Region: Prague
- District: Prague 22

Area
  - Total: 6.5 km^{2} (2.5 sq mi)

Population (2021)
  - Total: 3,944
  - Density: 610/km^{2} (1,600/sq mi)
- Time zone: UTC+1 (CET)
  - Summer (DST): UTC+2 (CEST)

Kolovraty, officially Prague-Kolovraty, is a municipal district (městská část) in Prague, Czech Republic.

== Demographics ==
Historical population
| Year | Pop. | ±% |
|---|---|---|
| 1869 | 548 | — |
| 1880 | 705 | +28.6% |
| 1890 | 728 | +3.3% |
| 1900 | 746 | +2.5% |
| 1910 | 785 | +5.2% |
| 1921 | 794 | +1.1% |
| 1930 | 1,773 | +123.3% |
| 1950 | 1,708 | −3.7% |
| 1961 | 1,740 | +1.9% |
| 1970 | 1,596 | −8.3% |
| 1980 | 1,478 | −7.4% |
| 1991 | 1,451 | −1.8% |
| 2001 | 1,756 | +21.0% |
| 2011 | 3,448 | +96.4% |
| 2021 | 3,944 | +14.4% |
Source: Censuses
