= Pitkovice =

- Municipal District of Prague; Cadastral Area of Prague
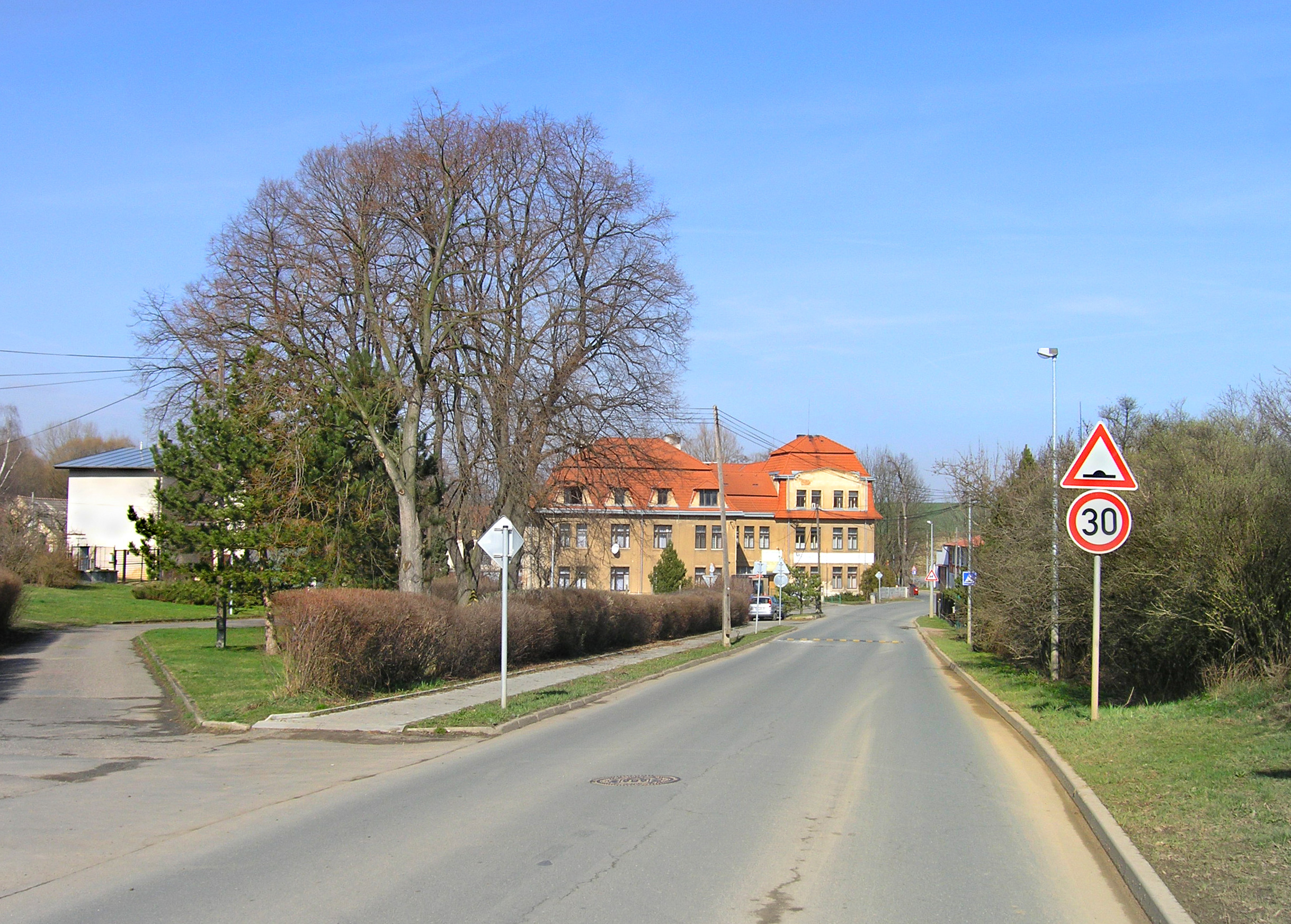
- Northern part of Pitkovice

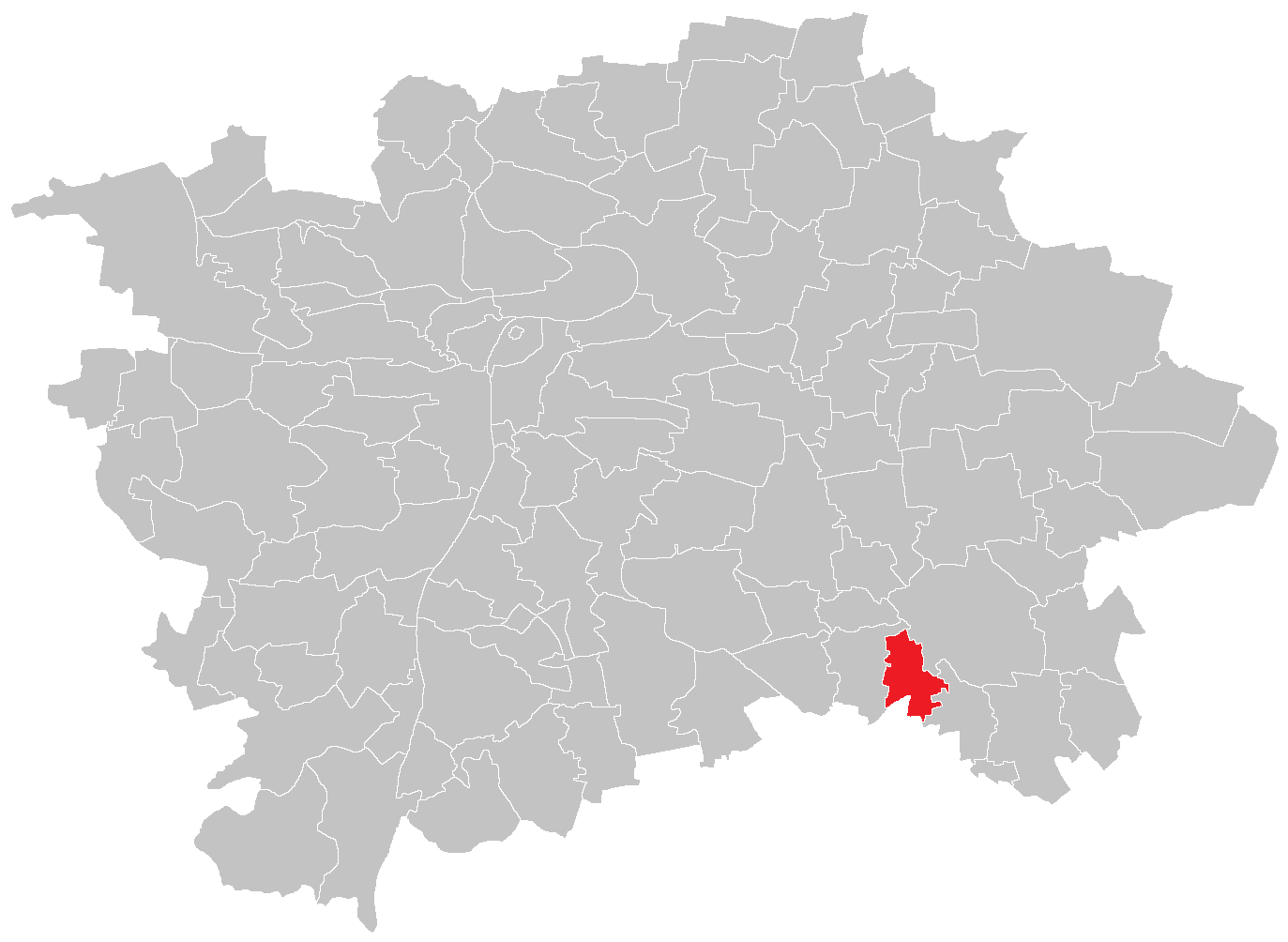
- Location of Pitkovice in Prague
- Coordinates: 50.0211°N 14.5792°E
- Country: Czech Republic
- Region: Prague, the Capital City
- Administrative district: Prague 22
- Municipal district: Prague 10

Area
  - Total: 2.40 km^{2} (0.93 sq mi)

Population (2021)
  - Total: 2,208
  - Density: 920/km^{2} (2,380/sq mi)
- Time zone: UTC+1 (CET)
  - Summer (DST): UTC+2 (CEST)
- Postal code: 104 00

Pitkovice is a city part and cadastral area in Prague, Czech Republic. It is situated in the south-eastern part of the city, and is part of the administrative district Prague 22 in the municipal district Prague 10. Pitkovice is named after Oto of Pitkov, a former owner of the local fortress.
