= Satalice =

- Municipal District of Prague
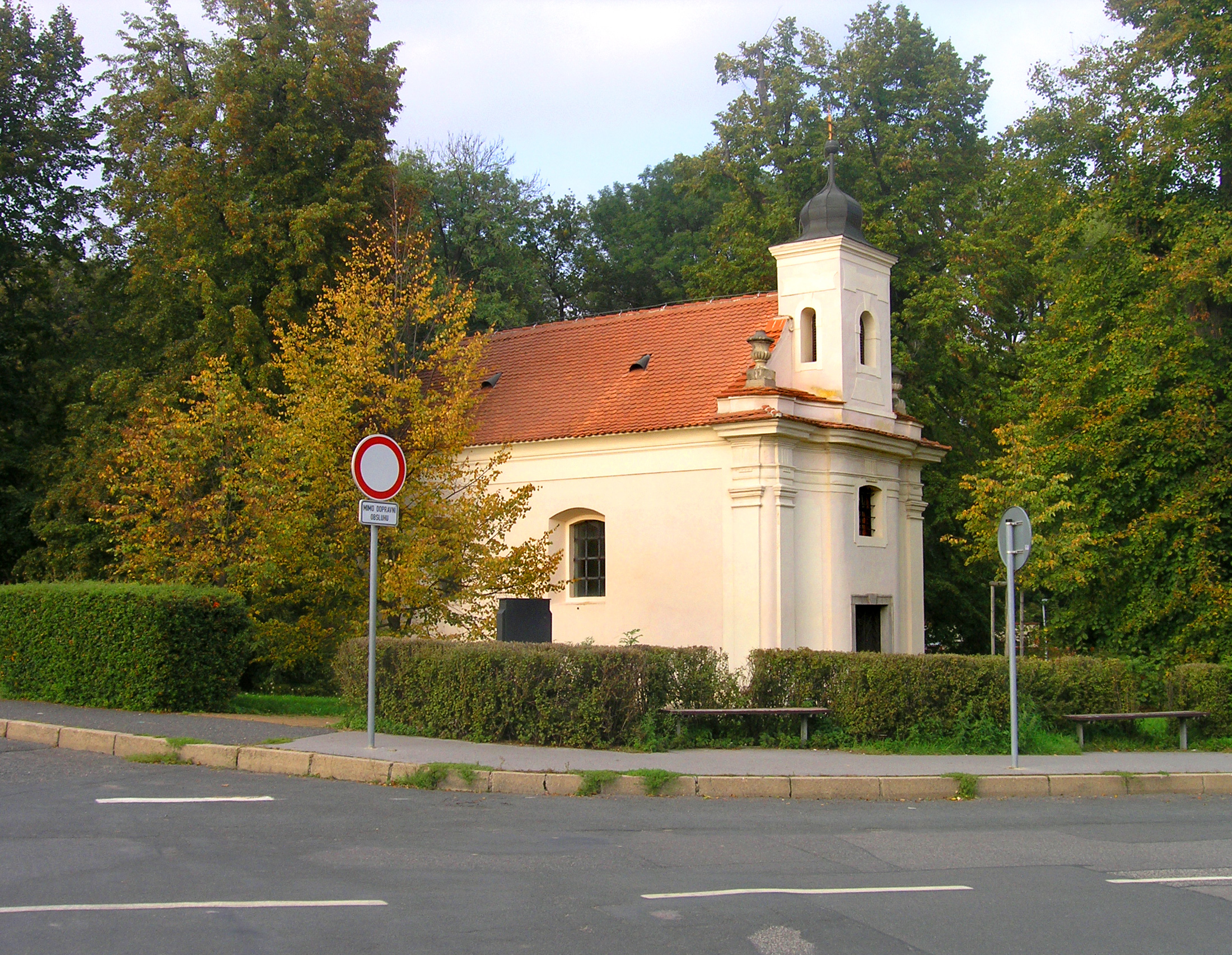
- Chapel of Saint Anne

- Flag Coat of arms
- Interactive map of Satalice
- Coordinates: 50°7′29″N 14°34′24″E
- Country: Czech Republic
- Region: Prague
- District: Prague 19
- Time zone: UTC+1 (CET)
  - Summer (DST): UTC+2 (CEST)

Satalice is a municipal district (městská část) in Prague, Czech Republic.
