= Křeslice =

- Municipal District of Prague
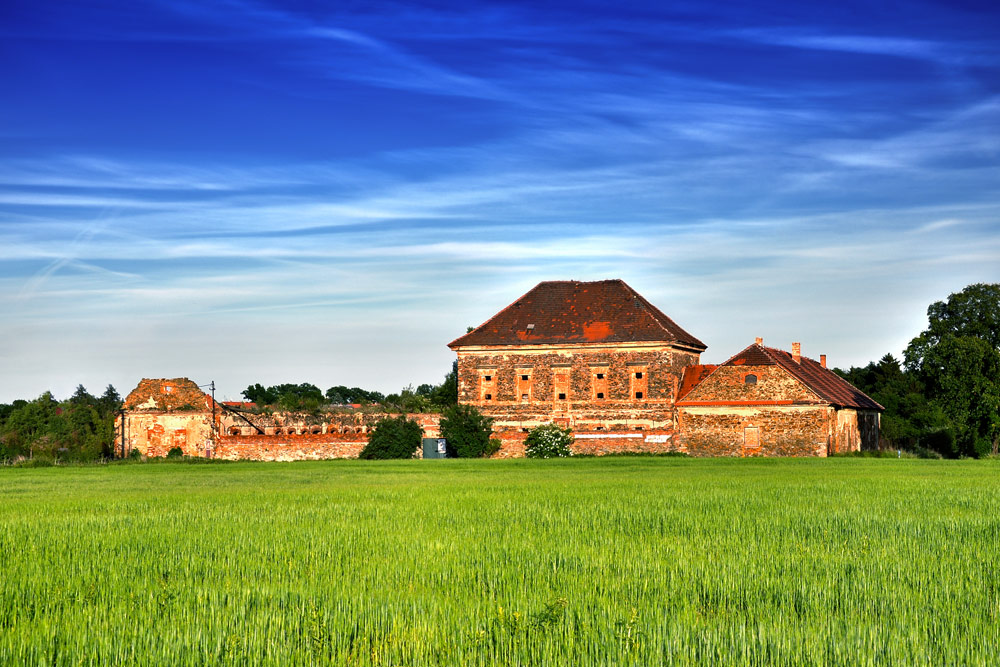
- Štít farmstead, formerly a fort

- Flag Coat of arms
- Interactive map of Křeslice
- Coordinates: 50°1′24″N 14°33′54″E
- Country: Czech Republic
- Region: Prague
- District: Prague 11
- Time zone: UTC+1 (CET)
  - Summer (DST): UTC+2 (CEST)

Křeslice is a municipal district (městská část) in Prague, Czech Republic.

== Demographics ==
Historical population
| Year | Pop. | ±% |
|---|---|---|
| 1869 | 202 | — |
| 1880 | 239 | +18.3% |
| 1890 | 205 | −14.2% |
| 1900 | 213 | +3.9% |
| 1910 | 204 | −4.2% |
| 1921 | 217 | +6.4% |
| 1930 | 232 | +6.9% |
| 1950 | 199 | −14.2% |
| 1961 | 234 | +17.6% |
| 1970 | 184 | −21.4% |
| 1980 | 214 | +16.3% |
| 1991 | 235 | +9.8% |
| 2001 | 343 | +46.0% |
| 2011 | 979 | +185.4% |
| 2021 | 1,173 | +19.8% |
Source: Censuses
