= Dolní Chabry =

Coordinates: 50°09′N 14°27′E

- Municipal District & Cadastral Area of Prague
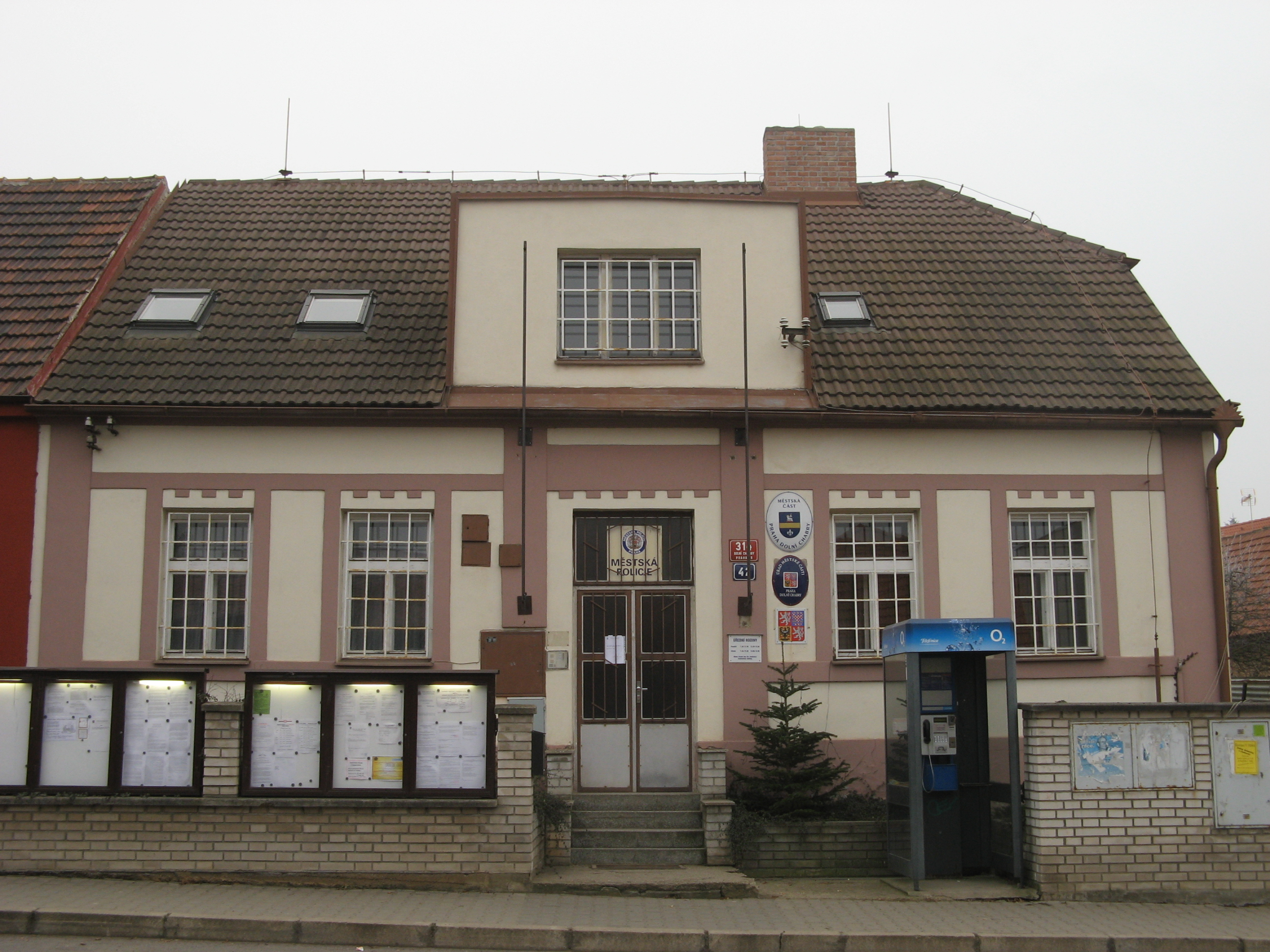
- Town Hall

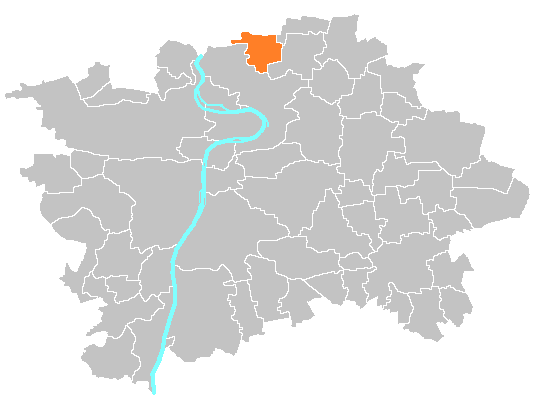
- Location of Dolní Chabry in Prague
- Country: Czechia
- Municipality: Prague

Area
  - Total: 4.49 km^{2} (1.73 sq mi)

Population
  - Total: 3,382
  - Density: 753/km^{2} (1,950/sq mi)

Dolní Chabry is a suburb of Prague in the Czech Republic. There are eight Menhirs located within this suburb, as well as a 12th-century Romanesque church.

== Demographics ==
Historical population
Year	Pop.	±%
1869	452	—
1880	531	+17.5%
1890	639	+20.3%
1900	700	+9.5%
1910	757	+8.1%
1921	734	−3.0%
1930	1,743	+137.5%
1950	2,469	+41.7%
1961	2,604	+5.5%
1970	2,383	−8.5%
1980	2,603	+9.2%
1991	2,269	−12.8%
2001	2,483	+9.4%
2011	4,006	+61.3%
2021	5,035	+25.7%
Source: Censuses
