= Lipence =

- Municipal District of Prague
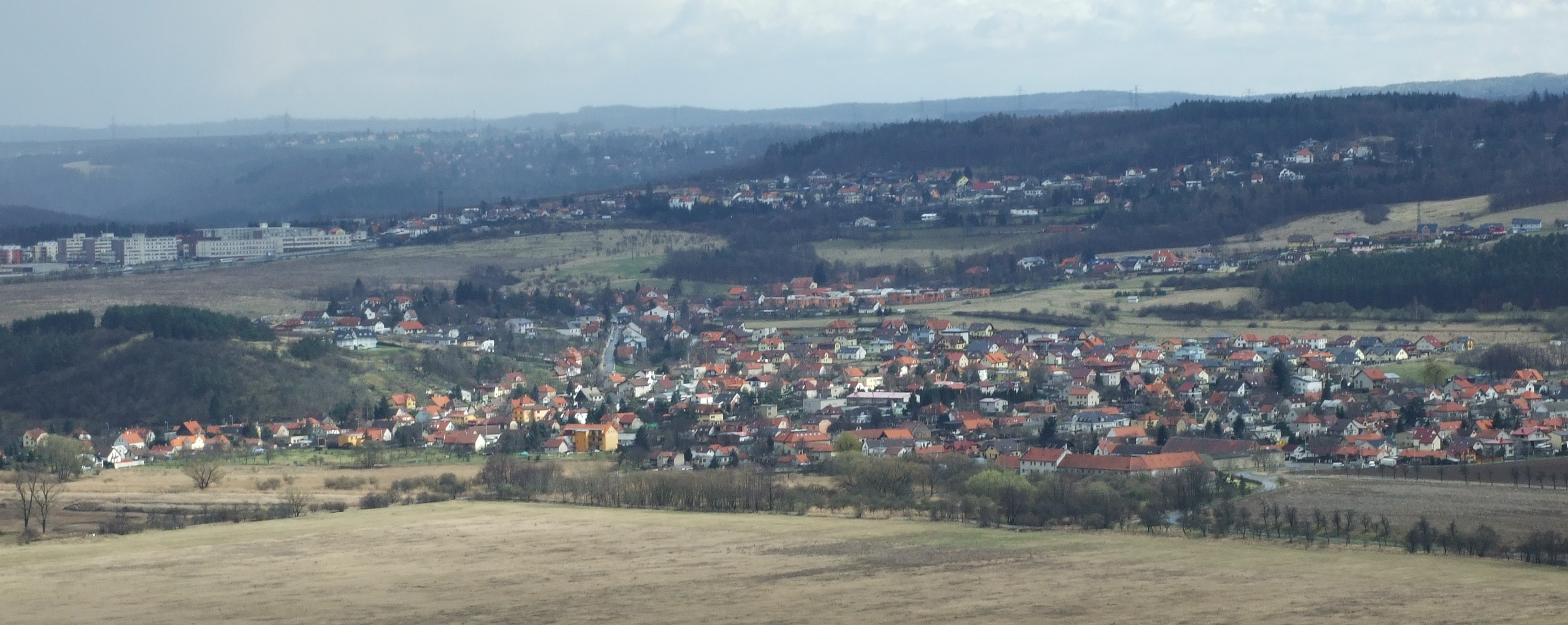
- Lipence seen from Černošice

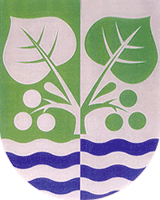
- Flag Coat of arms
- Interactive map of Lipence
- Coordinates: 49.9602778°N 14.3580556°E
- Country: Czech Republic
- Region: Prague
- District: Prague 16
- Time zone: UTC+1 (CET)
  - Summer (DST): UTC+2 (CEST)

Lipence is a municipal district (městská část) in Prague, Czech Republic.

There are 50 streets, around 900 house descriptive numbers and 950 registration numbers. Over 3000 people live here.

Lipence is located on the right bank of the river Berounka, in the southeast part of Prague. It is bordered by Zbraslav on the east and northeast. The river Berounka is the border between Lipence and Radotín on northwest and west.
