= Nedvězí u Říčan =

- Municipal district of Prague
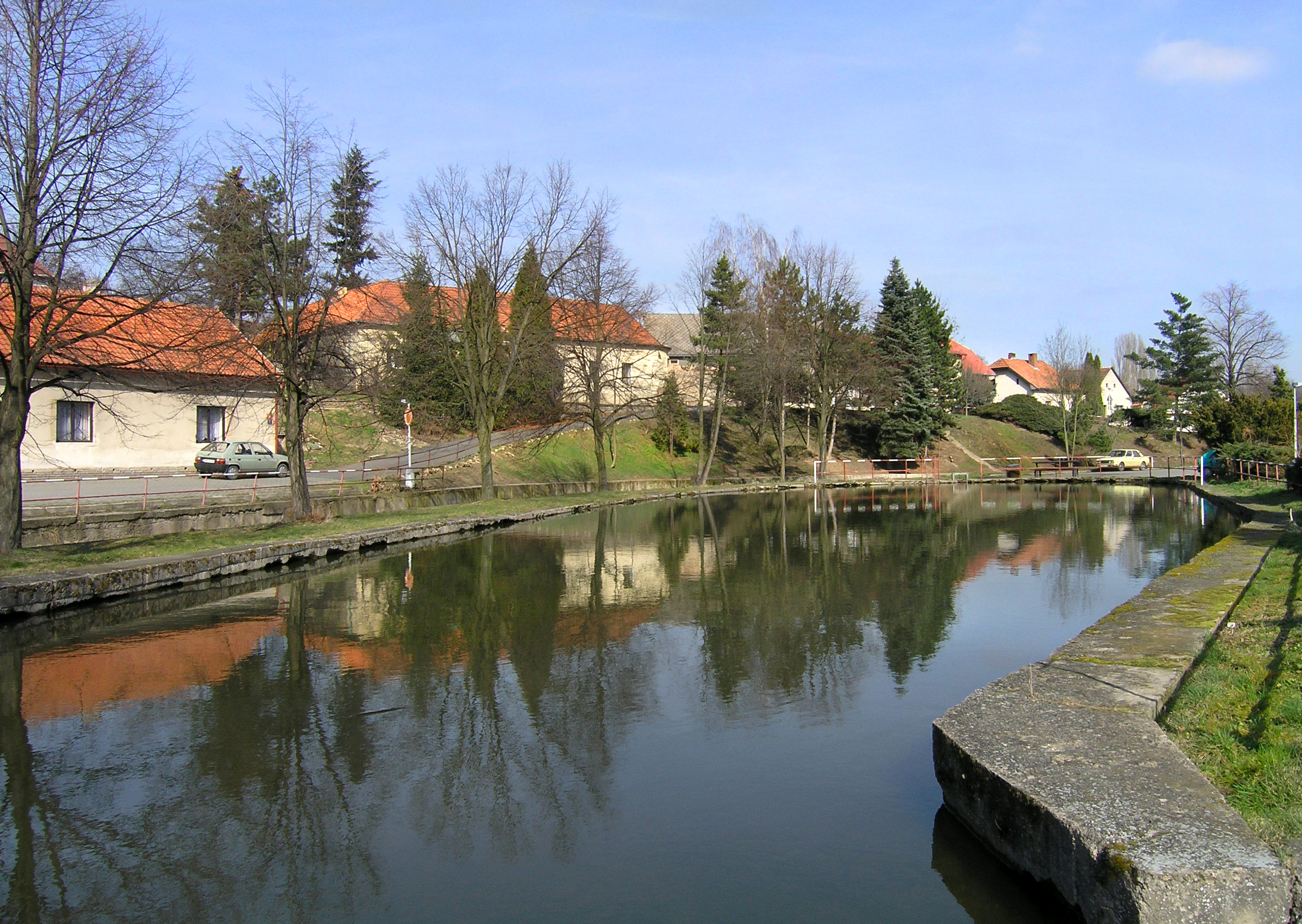

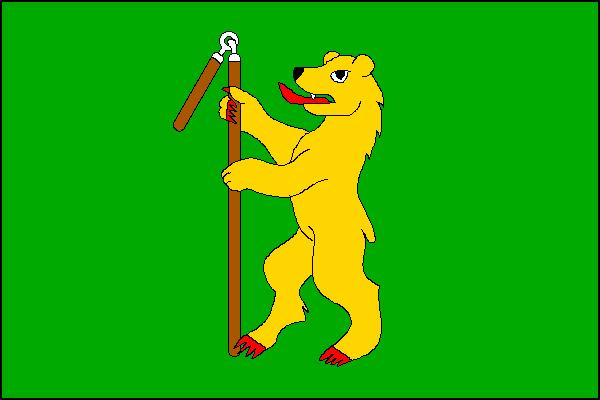
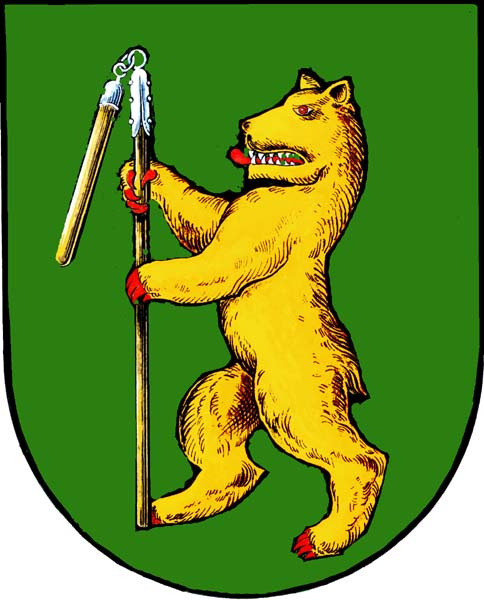
- Flag Coat of arms
- Interactive map of Nedvězí u Říčan
- Coordinates: 50°1′5″N 14°39′10″E
- Country: Czech Republic
- Region: Prague
- District: Prague 22

Area
  - Total: 3.81 km^{2} (1.47 sq mi)

Population (2021)
  - Total: 366
  - Density: 96.1/km^{2} (249/sq mi)
- Time zone: UTC+1 (CET)
  - Summer (DST): UTC+2 (CEST)

Nedvězí u Říčan is a municipal district (městská část) in Prague, Czech Republic.

== Demographics ==
Historical population
Year	Pop.	±%
1869	238	—
1880	275	+15.5%
1890	288	+4.7%
1900	287	−0.3%
1910	299	+4.2%
1921	313	+4.7%
1930	342	+9.3%
1950	210	−38.6%
1961	218	+3.8%
1970	201	−7.8%
1980	188	−6.5%
1991	218	+16.0%
2001	232	+6.4%
2011	320	+37.9%
2021	366	+14.4%
Source: Censuses
