= Zadní Kopanina =

- Cadastral district of Prague
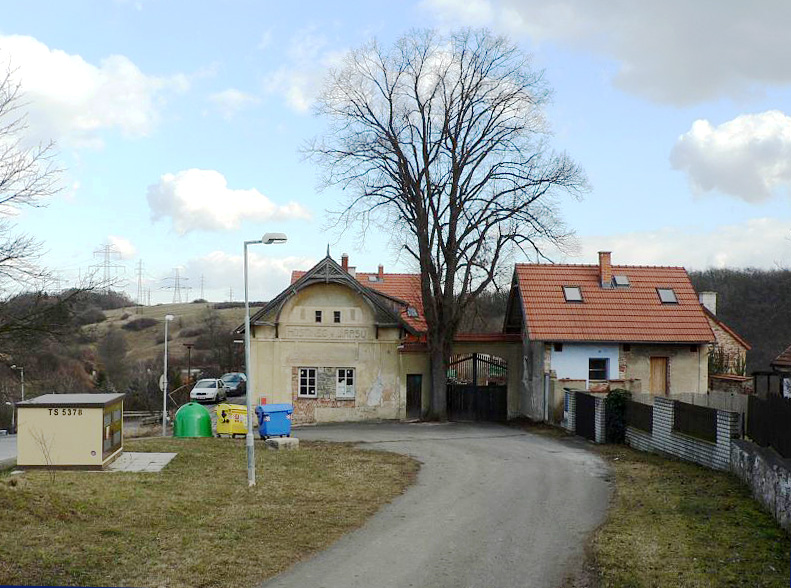
- Old inn of K Zadní Kopanině.

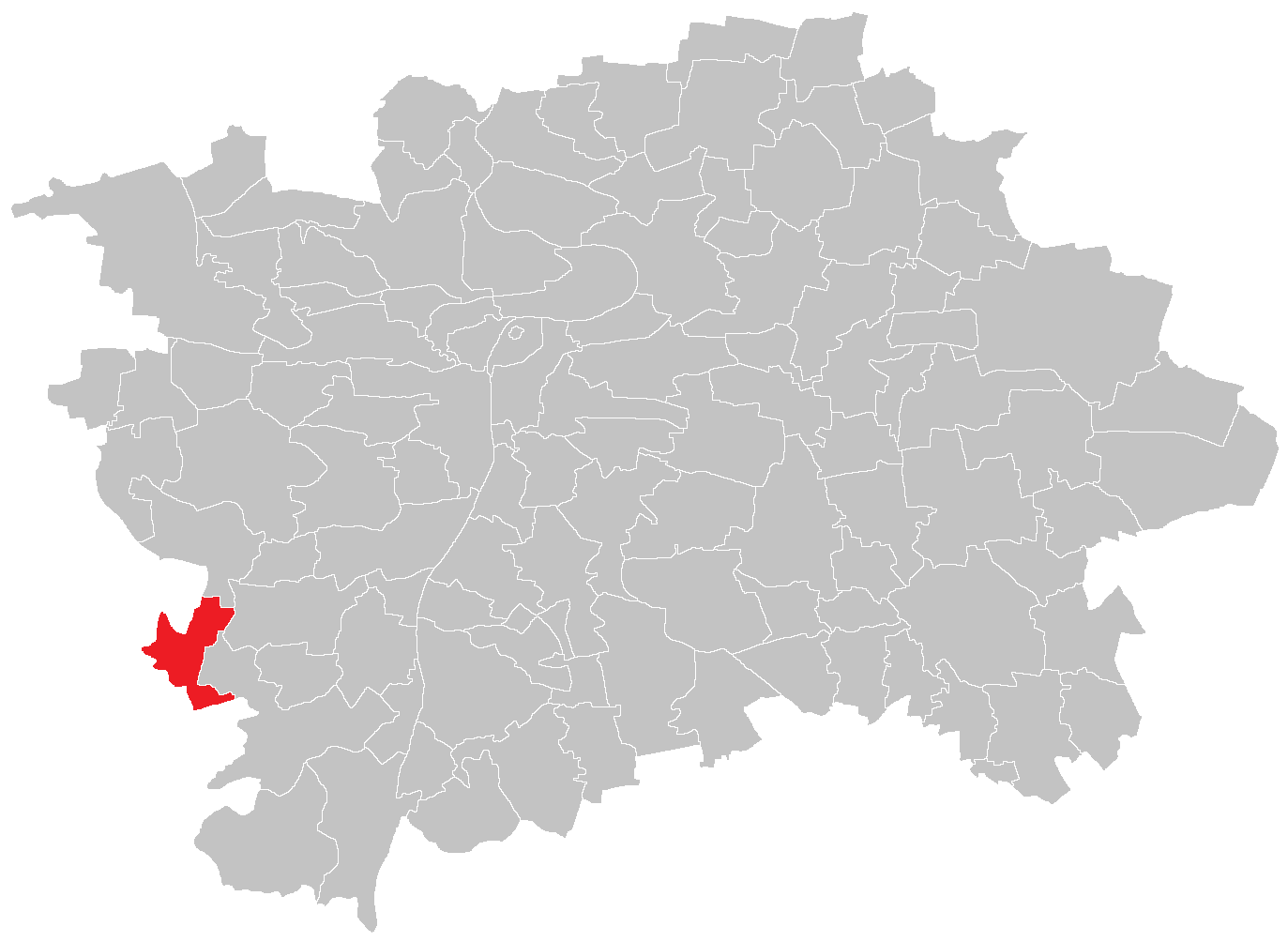
- Location of Zadní Kopanina within the City of Prague.
- Coordinates: 50°0′23.5″N 14°18′47.7″E
- Country: Czech Republic
- City: Prague
- District: Prague 13
- Incorporated into Prague: 1974

Area
  - Total: 3.5 km^{2} (1.4 sq mi)

Population (2021)
  - Total: 123
  - Density: 35/km^{2} (91/sq mi)
- Time zone: UTC+1 (CET)
  - Summer (DST): UTC+2 (CEST)

Zadní Kopanina (German: Hinter Kopanin) is a cadastral district of Prague, Czech Republic. It is the least populated cadastral area of Prague, with 110 inhabitants as of 31 December 2021.

== Demographics ==
Historical population

Year	Pop.	±%
1869	181	—
1880	166	−8.3%
1890	197	+18.7%
1900	193	−2.0%
1910	193	+0.0%
1921	195	+1.0%
1930	179	−8.2%
1950	119	−33.5%

Year	Pop.	±%
1961	112	−5.9%
1970	96	−14.3%
1980	78	−18.8%
1991	67	−14.1%
2001	71	+6.0%
2011	88	+23.9%
2021	123	+39.8%

Source: Censuses
