= Prague-Velká Chuchle =

- Municipal District of Prague
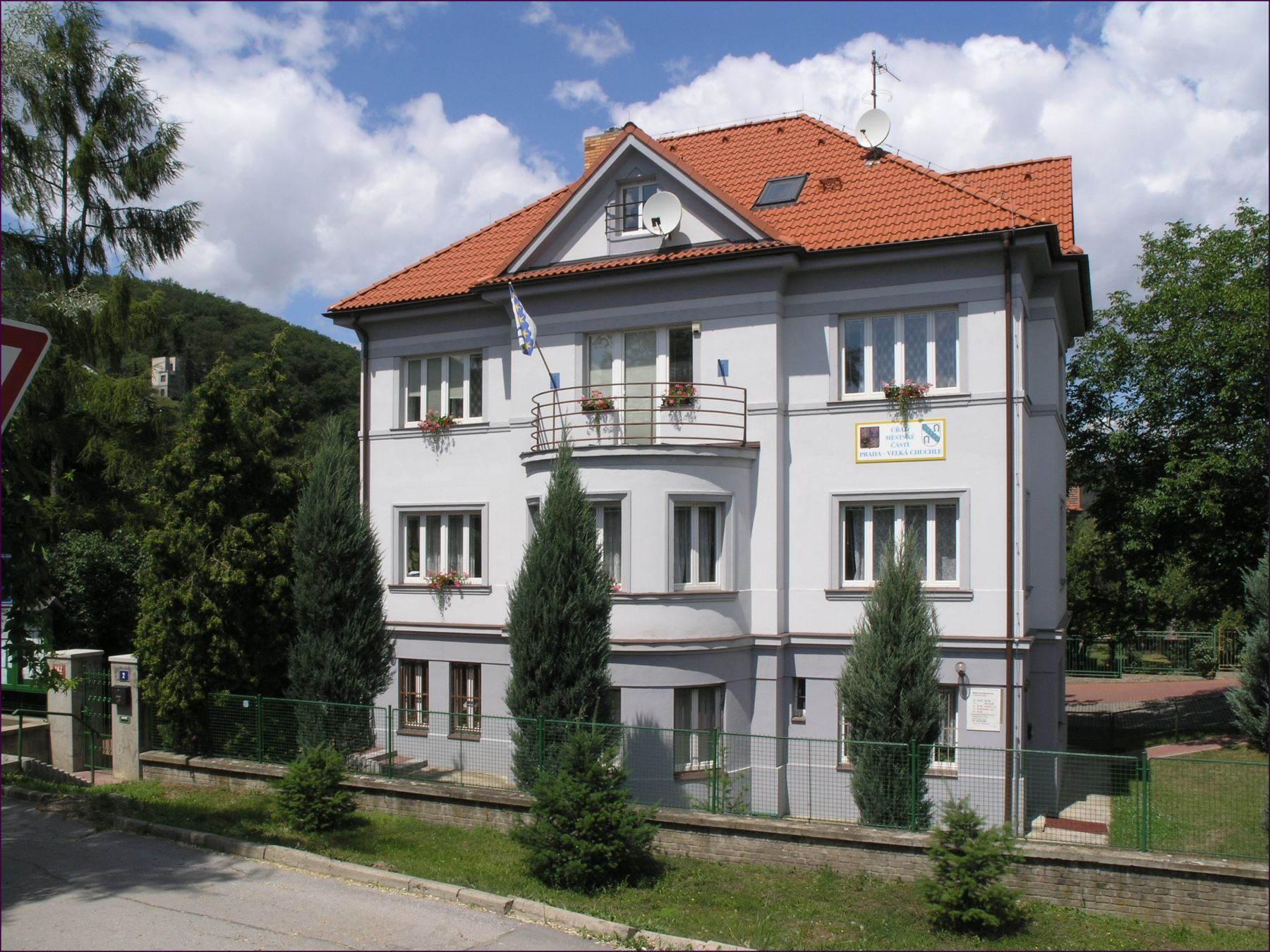
- District office in Prague-Velká Chuchle

- Flag Coat of arms

- Location of Prague-Velká Chuchle in Prague
- Coordinates: 50.01389°N 14.38833°E
- Country: Czech Republic
- Region: Prague
- Administrative district: Praha 16
- Municipal district: Praha 5

Area
  - Total: 6.03 km^{2} (2.33 sq mi)

Population (2021)
  - Total: 2,827
  - Density: 469/km^{2} (1,210/sq mi)
- Time zone: UTC+1 (CET)
  - Summer (DST): UTC+2 (CEST)
- Postal code: 159 00

Prague-Velká Chuchle is a district in Prague, Czech Republic. It is situated in the southern part of the city, in the administrative district Prague 16. The cadastral area Velká Chuchle is part of this district.
