= Šeberov =

- Municipal District of Prague
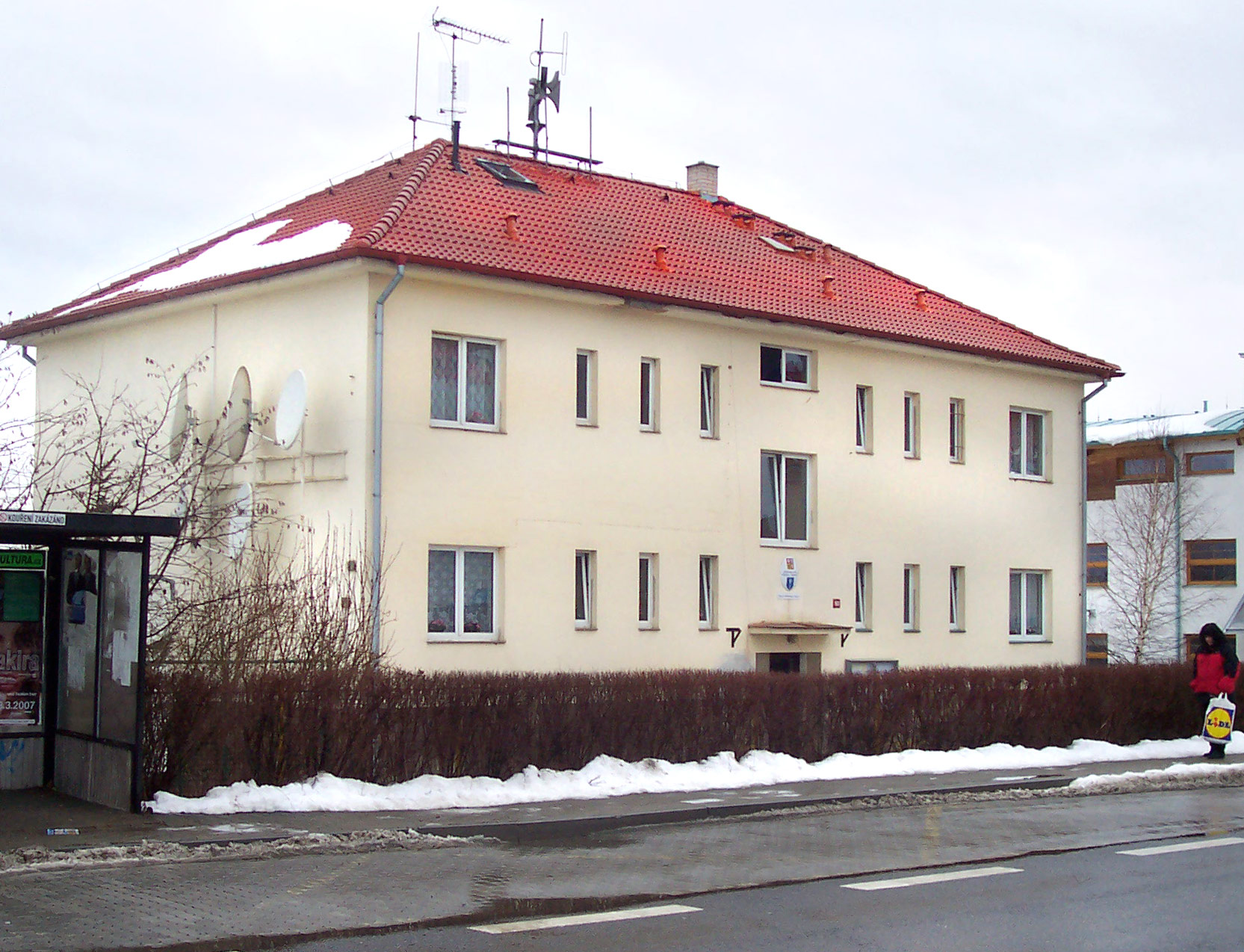
- Municipal office

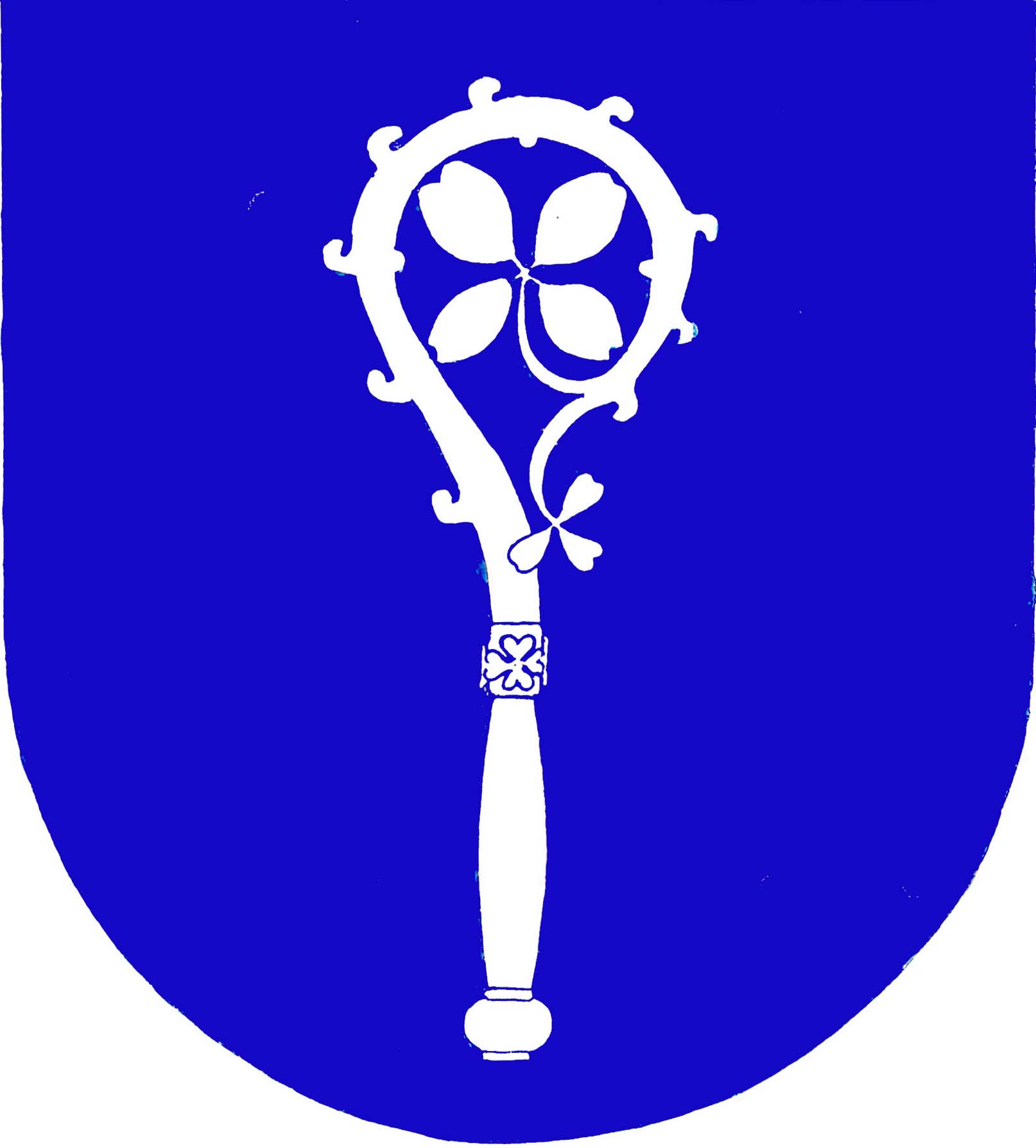
- Flag Coat of arms
- Interactive map of Šeberov
- Coordinates: 50°0′46″N 14°30′50″E
- Country: Czech Republic
- Region: Prague
- District: Prague 11
- Time zone: UTC+1 (CET)
  - Summer (DST): UTC+2 (CEST)

Šeberov is a municipal district (městská část) in Prague, Czech Republic.
