= Nebušice =

- Municipal District of Prague; Cadastral Area of Prague
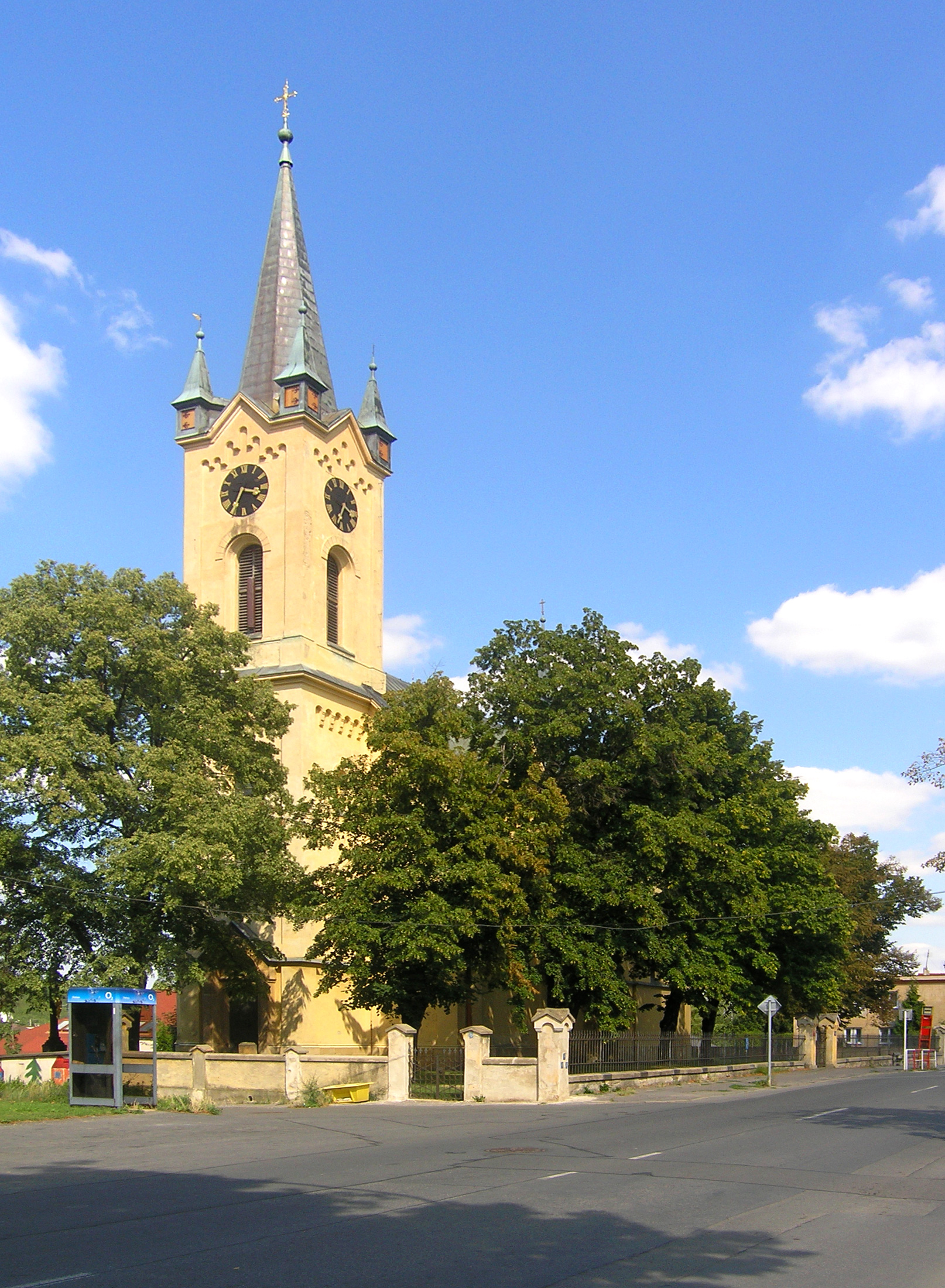
- Church in Nebušice

- Flag Coat of arms

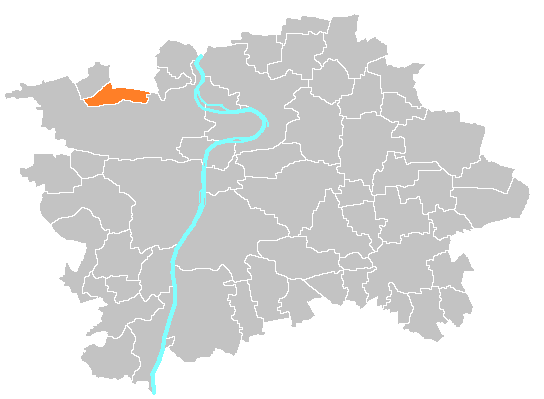
- Location of Nebušice in Prague
- Coordinates: 50°6′40.4″N 14°19′31.13″E
- Country: Czech Republic
- Region: Prague, the Capital City

Government
  - Mayor: Viktor Komárek

Area
  - Total: 3.68 km^{2} (1.42 sq mi)

Population (2015)
  - Total: 3,319
  - Density: 902/km^{2} (2,340/sq mi)
- Time zone: UTC+1 (CET)
  - Summer (DST): UTC+2 (CEST)
- Postal code: 164 00
- Website: http://www.prahanebusice.cz

Nebušice is a district of Prague 6. It is situated northwest of the city center. It is connected with the city center by four bus lines, from bus station Bořislavka 161 and 312.

== History ==
Nebušice was connected to Prague in 1968, before then it was a village.
