= Prague-Čakovice =

- Municipal District of Prague
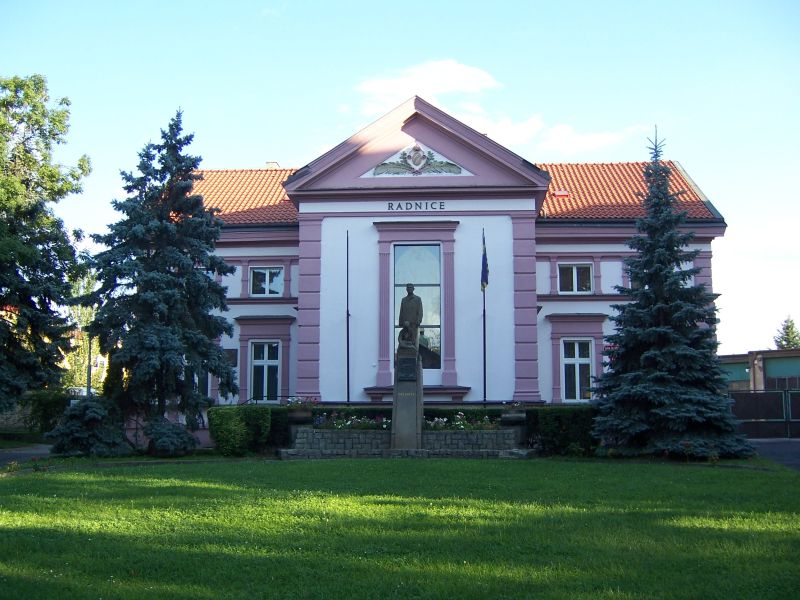
- Town hall in Prague-Čakovice

- Flag Coat of arms

- Location of Prague-Čakovice in Prague
- Coordinates: 50.1511°N 14.5247°E
- Country: Czech Republic
- Region: Prague
- Administrative district: Prague 18
- Municipal district: Prague 9

Area
  - Total: 10.18 km^{2} (3.93 sq mi)

Population (2021)
  - Total: 11,984
  - Density: 1,177/km^{2} (3,049/sq mi)
- Time zone: UTC+1 (CET)
  - Summer (DST): UTC+2 (CEST)
- Postal code: 196 00

Prague-Čakovice is a district in Prague, Czech Republic. It is situated in the southern part of the city, in the administrative district Prague 18. The cadastral area Čakovice is part of this district.
