= Benice (Prague) =

Benice Benice
- Municipal District of Prague; Cadastral Area of Prague
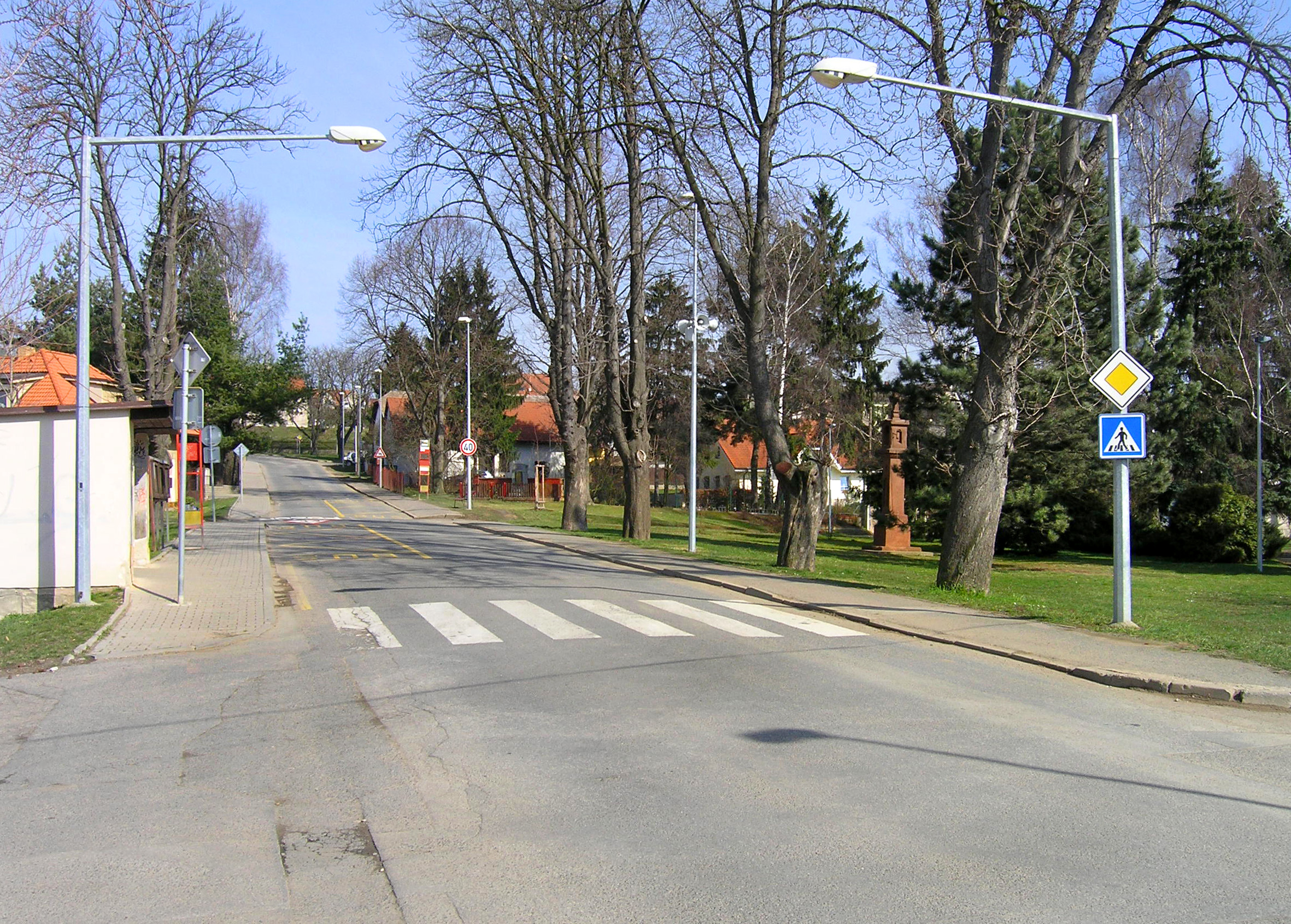
- Květnového povstání street in Benice

- Flag Coat of arms

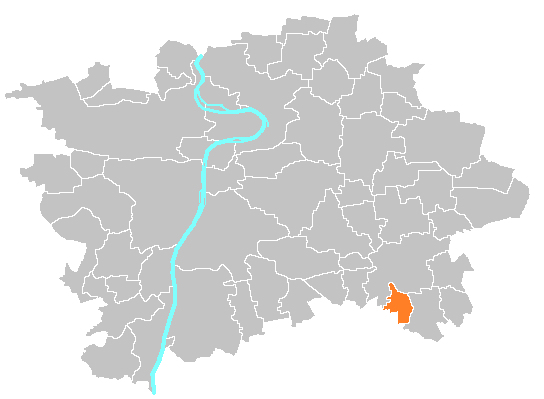
- Location of Benice in Prague
- Coordinates: 50°0′47″N 14°36′15″E
- Country: Czech Republic
- Region: Prague
- District: Prague 22

Government
  - Mayor: Hana Karasová

Area
  - Total: 2.77 km^{2} (1.07 sq mi)

Population (2021)
  - Total: 729
  - Density: 263/km^{2} (682/sq mi)
- Time zone: UTC+1 (CET)
  - Summer (DST): UTC+2 (CEST)
- Postal code: 103 00
- Website: http://www.praha-benice.cz

Benice is a municipal district (městská část) and cadastral area (katastrální území) in Prague. It is located in the south-eastern part of the city. As of 2021, there were 729 inhabitants living in Benice.

The first written record of Benice is from the 14th century. The village became part of Prague in 1974 with the last enlargement of the city.

== Demographics ==
Historical population
Year	Pop.	±%
1869	238	—
1880	248	+4.2%
1890	282	+13.7%
1900	275	−2.5%
1910	266	−3.3%
1921	286	+7.5%
1930	467	+63.3%
1950	328	−29.8%
1961	297	−9.5%
1970	337	+13.5%
1980	275	−18.4%
1991	256	−6.9%
2001	358	+39.8%
2011	552	+54.2%
2021	729	+32.1%
Source: Censuses
