= Březiněves =

Neighborhood of Prague 8

Březiněves Březiněves
- Municipal District of Prague; Cadastral Area of Prague
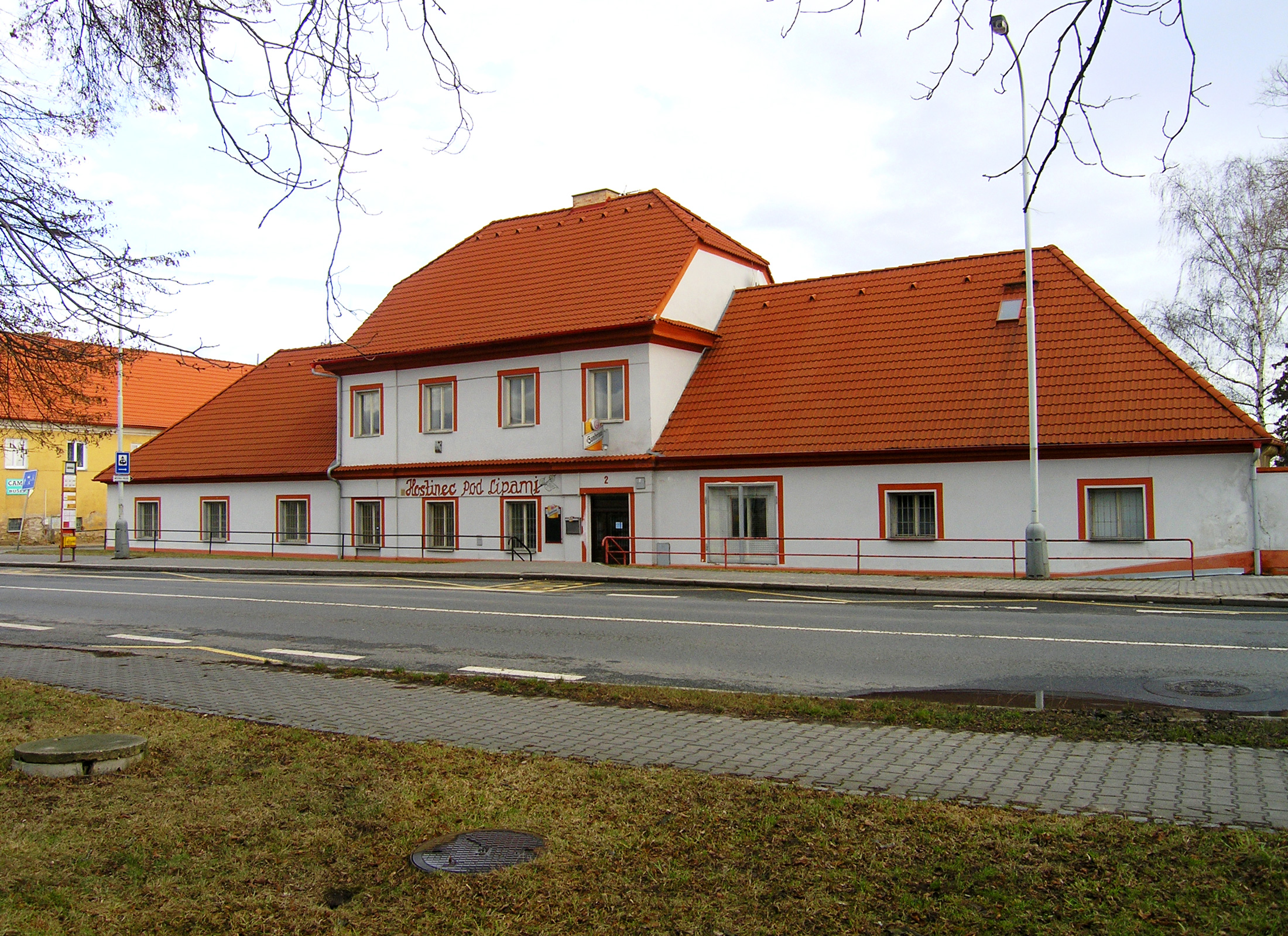
- Historical pub building in Březiněves

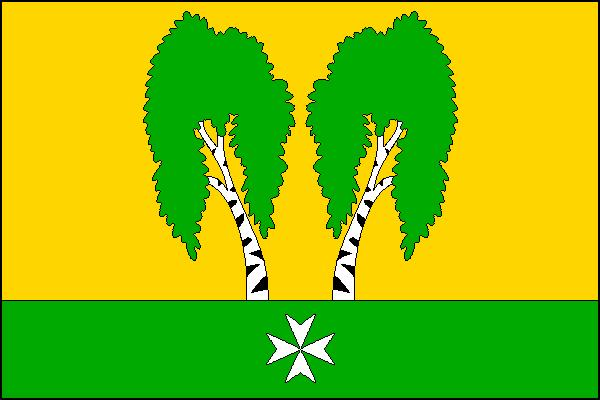
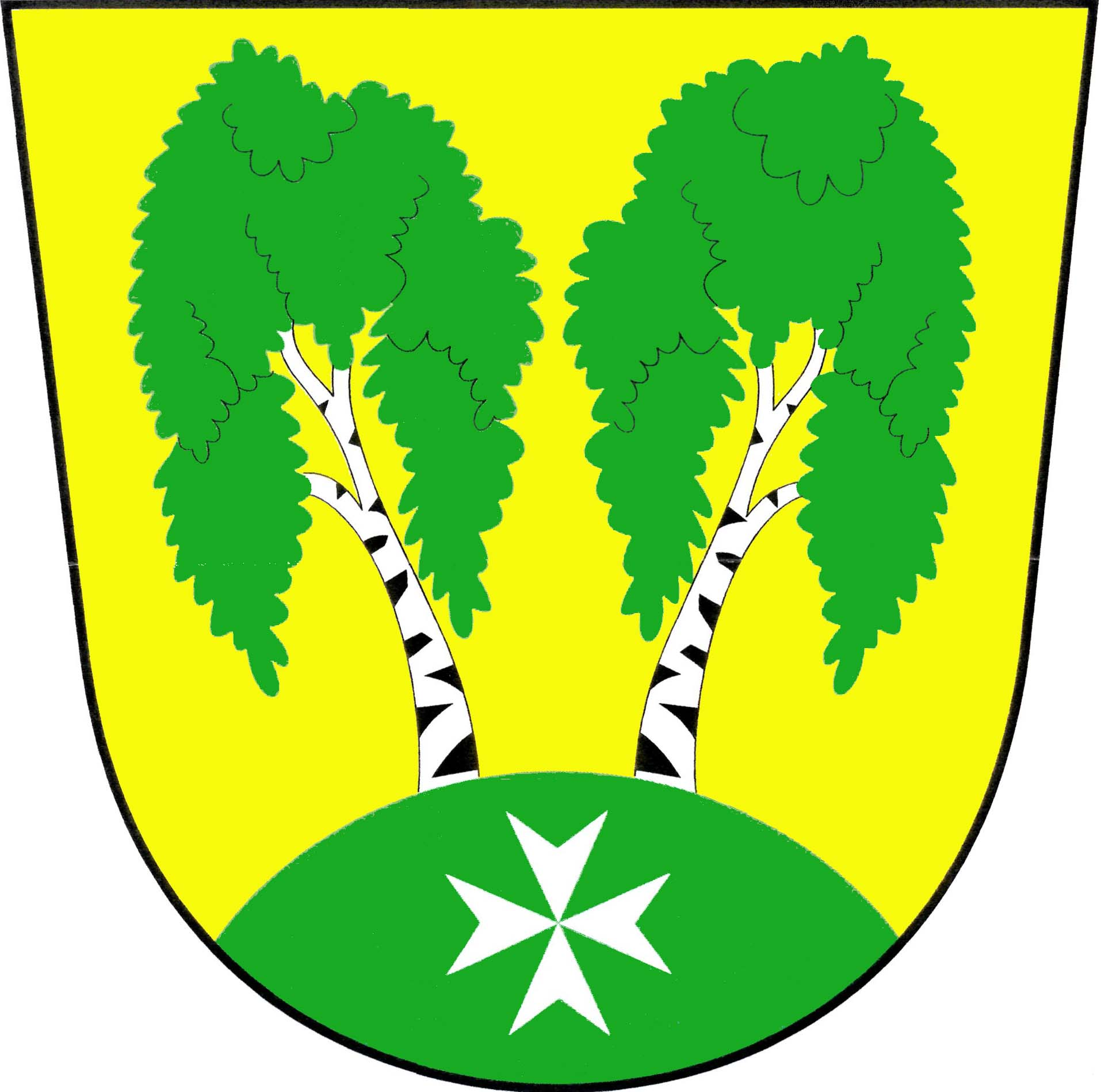
- Flag Coat of arms

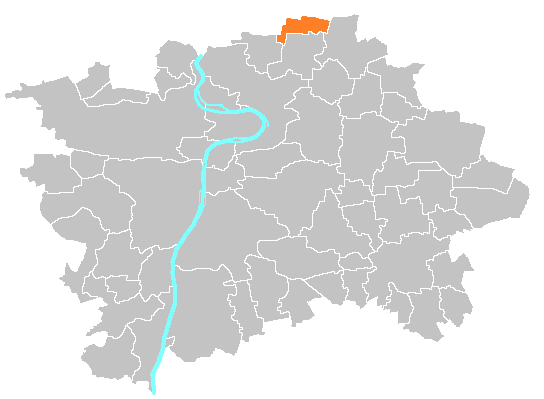
- Location of Březiněves in Prague
- Coordinates: 50°9′57″N 14°29′06″E
- Country: Czech Republic
- Region: Prague
- District: Prague 8

Government
  - Mayor: Jiří Haramul

Area
  - Total: 3.39 km^{2} (1.31 sq mi)

Population (2021)
  - Total: 1,821
  - Density: 537/km^{2} (1,390/sq mi)
- Time zone: UTC+1 (CET)
  - Summer (DST): UTC+2 (CEST)
- Postal code: 182 00
- Website: http://www.brezineves.com/

Březiněves is a municipal district (městská část) and cadastral area (katastrální území) in Prague. It is located in the northern part of the city. As of 2018, there were 1576 inhabitants living in Březiněves.

The first written record of Březiněves is from the 12th century. The village became part of Prague in 1974 with the last enlargement of the city.

== Demographics ==
Historical population
| Year | Pop. | ±% |
|---|---|---|
| 1869 | 208 | — |
| 1880 | 245 | +17.8% |
| 1890 | 287 | +17.1% |
| 1900 | 280 | −2.4% |
| 1910 | 265 | −5.4% |
| 1921 | 260 | −1.9% |
| 1930 | 384 | +47.7% |
| 1950 | 361 | −6.0% |
| 1961 | 412 | +14.1% |
| 1970 | 427 | +3.6% |
| 1980 | 516 | +20.8% |
| 1991 | 557 | +7.9% |
| 2001 | 667 | +19.7% |
| 2011 | 1,202 | +80.2% |
| 2021 | 1,821 | +51.5% |
Source: Censuses
