= Modřany Gully =

Protected area in the Czech Republic

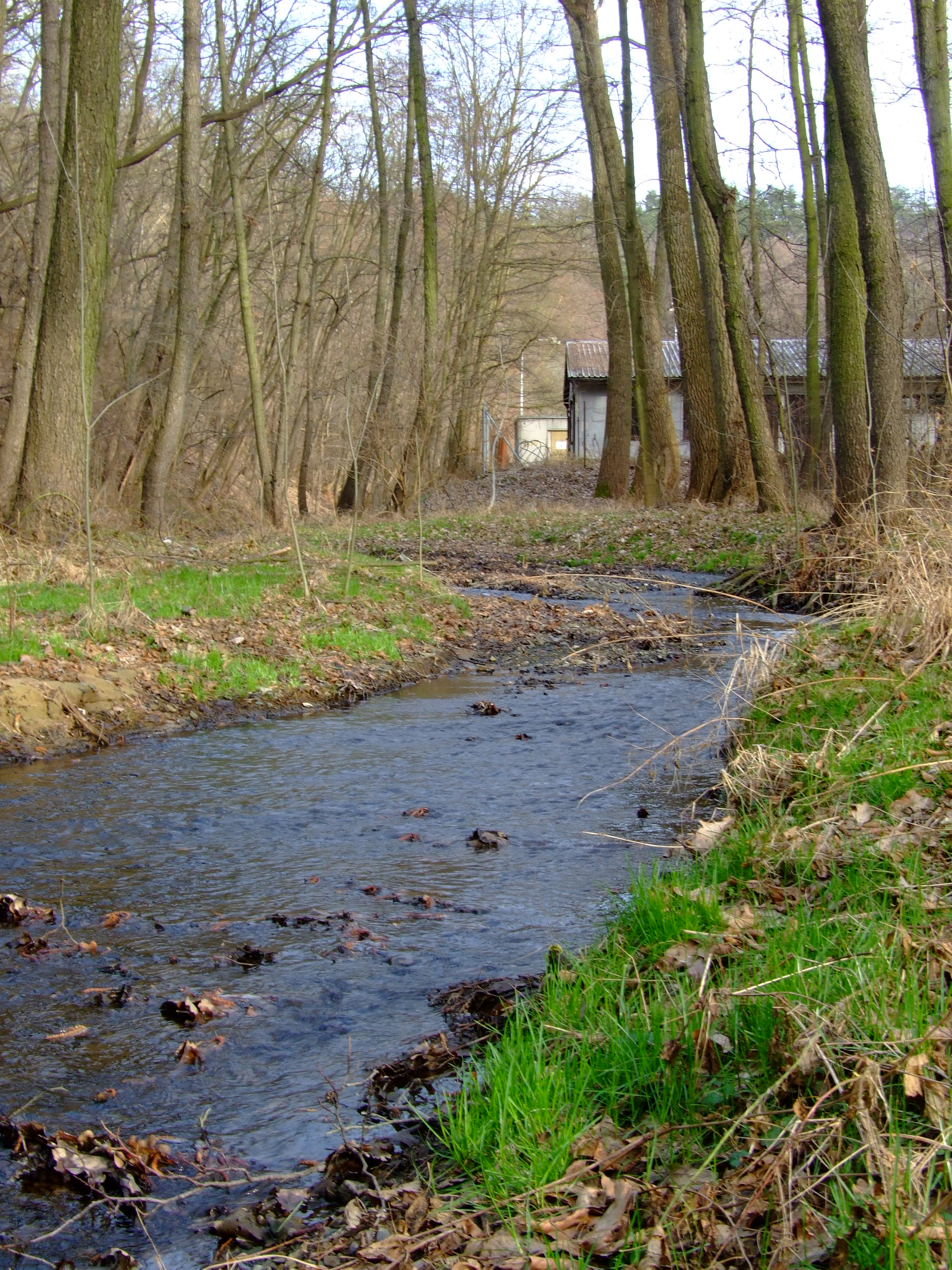

- Location within Prague
- Location: Czech Republic
- Coordinates: 50°0′6″N 14°26′35″E
- Area: 1.2488 km^{2} (0.4822 sq mi)
- Elevation: 214–300 m (702–984 ft)
- Established: 1988-09-01

The Modřany Gully nature reserve (Czech: Přírodní památka Modřanská rokle) is located in the districts of Modřany, Cholupice and Libuš of Prague, Czech Republic on the east side of the Vltava river. It was formed by erosion from the Libuš creek, which, in several places has exposed geologic profiles. It was granted protected status due to the riparian forest in the area near the creek, and the occurrence of thermophilic meadow ecologies on the slopes, but in recent years has suffered from encroachment of foreign flora, in particular the Black Locust tree. It is also an important recreational area between two housing estates, containing a nature trail and several cycling routes.

== Location ==
The reserve extends into four different cadastral districts of Prague 12: the western half lies in Modřany, the northeast corner and reservoir in Libuš, the area around a tributary to the south extends into Cholupice, and the extreme southeast headlands in Písnice.

== History ==
Until the 16th century, the territory around the gully belonged to the great estates of Komořany, Dolní Břežany and Kunratice. Around that time, it was mostly pastures and meadows, with a few oak shrubberies, and some rose alder and willow trees along the creek. In the year 1621, after the Battle of White Mountain, the land was confiscated from Stern von Hirschfeld, and assigned to the Zbraslav monastery. When the monastery was dissolved in 1785, the territory passed under the administration of state farms, and then in 1827 was purchased by Prince Frederick of Oettingen-Wallerstein, and then later was sold to the Albertan Knights. By the 20th century, most of the land was owned by the city of Modřany. At that time, the area started to be reforested, but unfortunately inappropriate species were used, especially black locust and black pine

== Nature ==
=== Geology ===
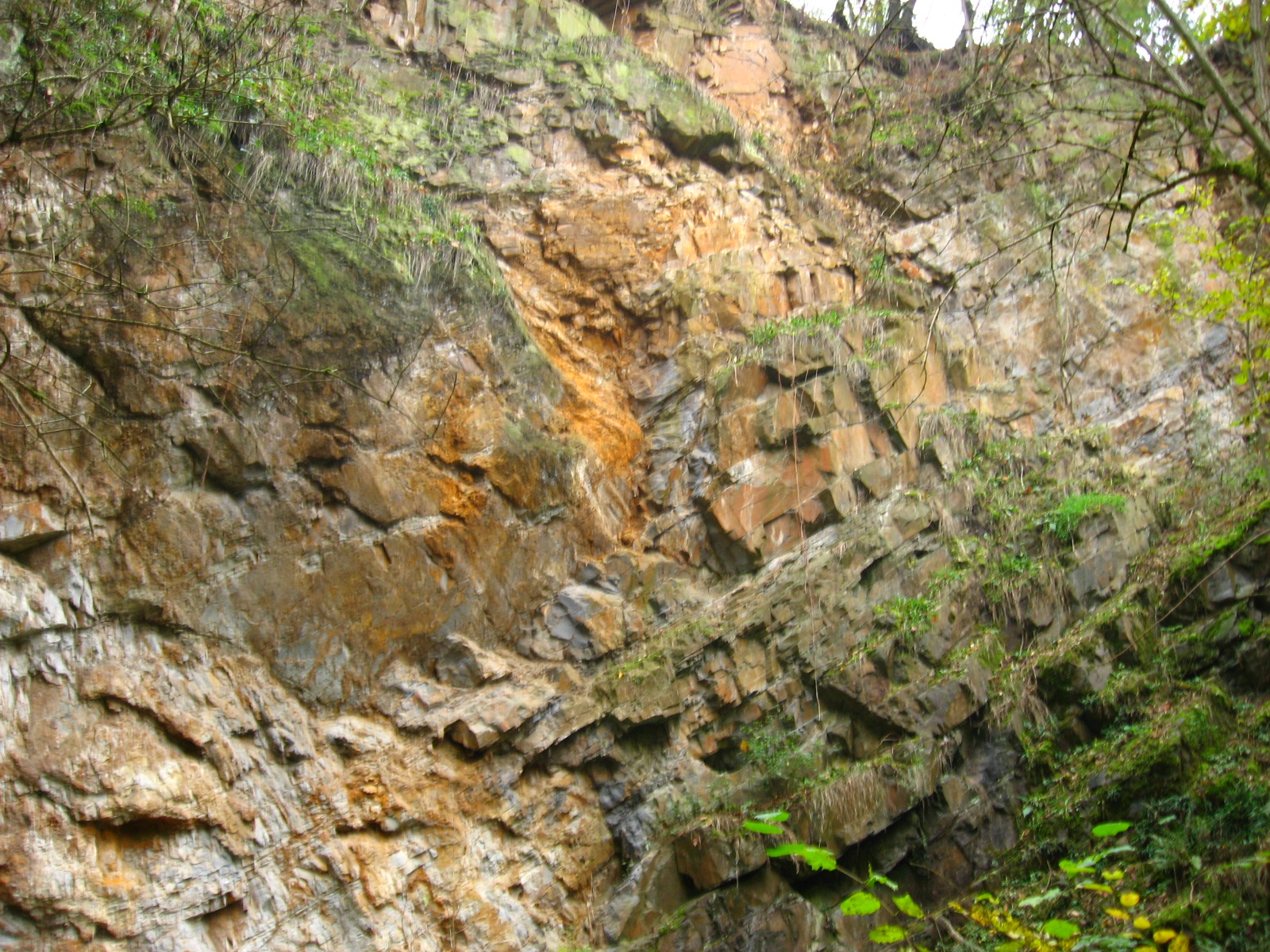
Westernmost quarry ravine in Modřany Gully, colored by limescale deposits

The eastern heights rests on Proterozoic bedrock.which during the Variscan orogeny lifted onto the Letná strata of the greater Ordovician, which is essentially the western part of the nature preserve. The gully itself was formed during the erosion of the Vltava River valley in quaternary period.

The area contains several notable formations. One of them is a quarry just east of the reservoir. It is in the part of the gully with the Proterozoic rocks. Gray and greenish greywacke, siltstone and clay shale are visible in the profile of quarry. About half a kilometer down the road to the west we can see the rock dobříšských conglomerates. Over 200 m west is another quarry with occurrence of siltstone and offal. Third quarry can be found about 100 m further to the west, south of the road. There are striking oblique fault štěchovických offal and siltstone, some cracks are healed quartz mineralized solutions are highly conspicuous rusty color coming from limonitových residues. Less than 400 m further west we get to Závitskému rearrangement, which is not well exposed.
