= Písnice =

Cadastral area of Prague, Czech Republic

- Cadastral Area of Prague
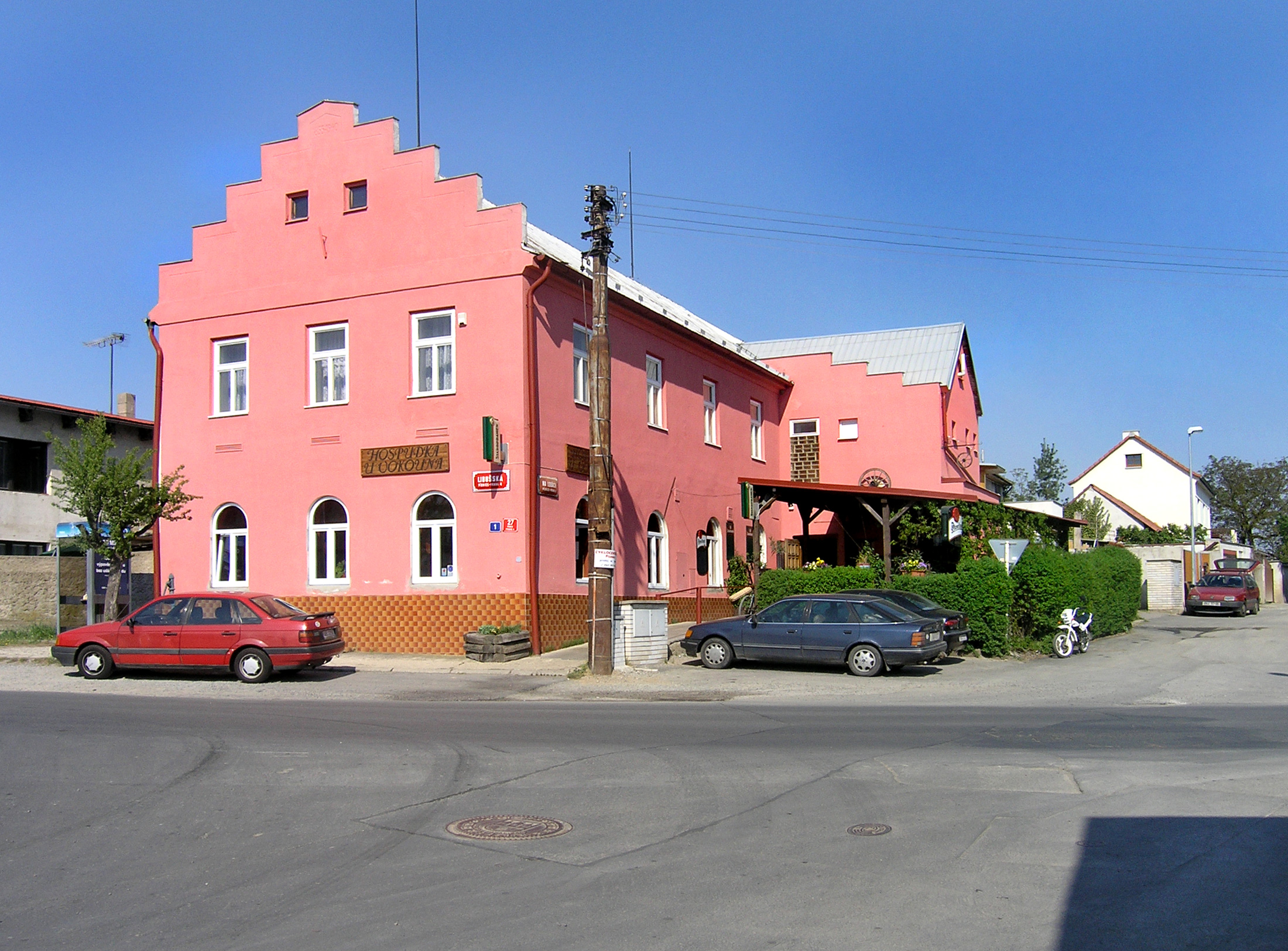
- Former pub U Vokouna in the south part of Písnice

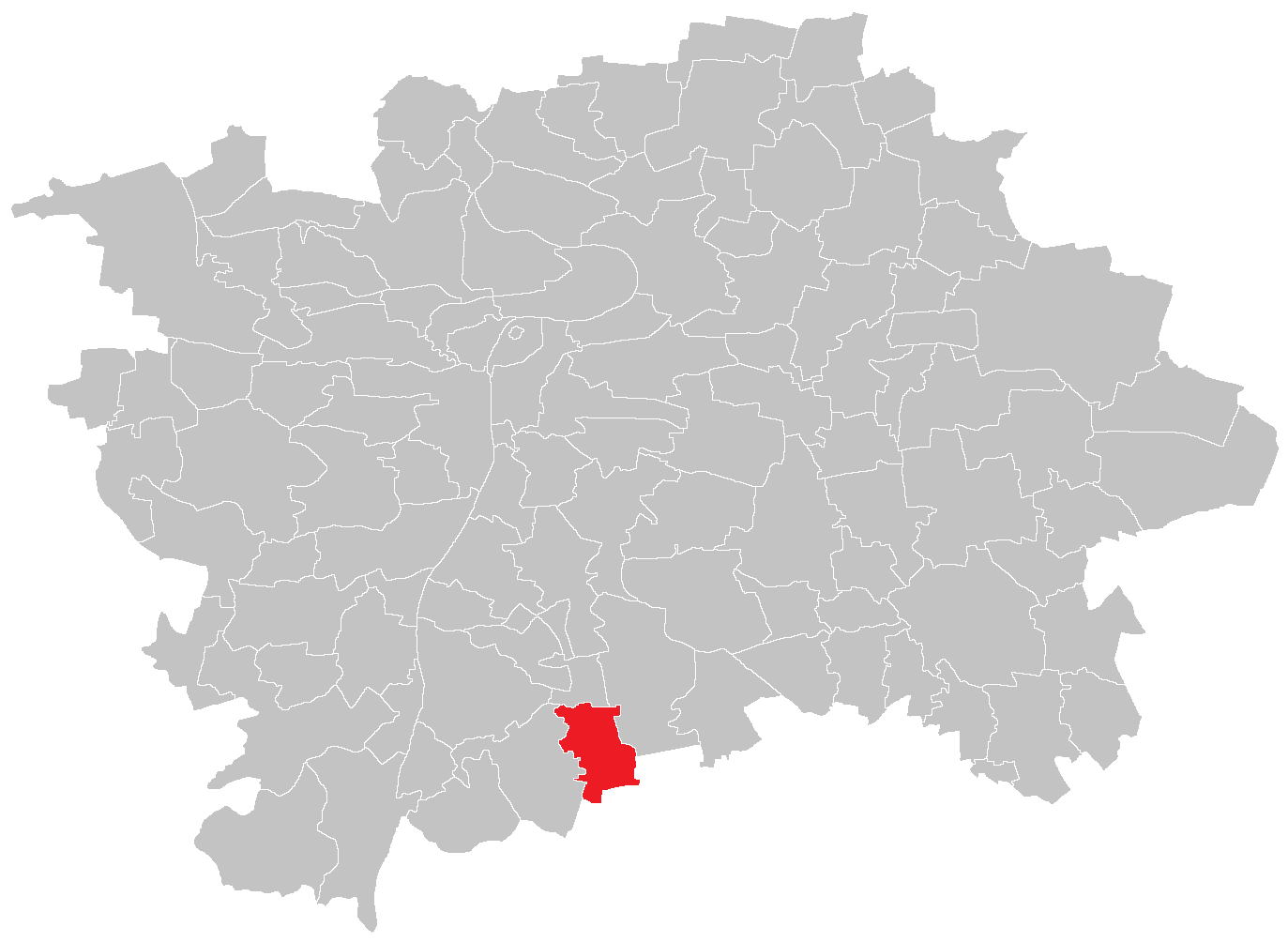
- Location of Píšnice in Prague
- Coordinates: 49°59′37″N 14°28′2″E
- Country: Czech Republic
- Region: Prague
- District: Prague-Libuš

Area
  - Total: 3.66 km^{2} (1.41 sq mi)

Population (2021)
  - Total: 4,497
  - Density: 1,230/km^{2} (3,180/sq mi)
- Time zone: UTC+1 (CET)
  - Summer (DST): UTC+2 (CEST)
- Postal code: 142 00

Písnice (German: Piesnitz) is a borough of the city of Prague, and a cadastral subdivision of Libuš and the municipal district of Prague 12. It was an independent municipality until its amalgamation into Prague in 1974. There are 42 streets and 496 addresses registered, and a population of over 4,000.

== Geography ==
Písnice consists of two distinct urban areas, separated by an undeveloped strip along the Kunratice bypass road, and its future extension. The southern part, consisting primarily of residential houses, is clustered around the historical village of Písnice. The northern part consists of a tower block housing estate and the grounds of a former meat factory.

Písnice is bordered on the north by Libuš, in the west by the village of Cholupice, on the east by Kunratice and the southeast by Hodkovice and the village of Vestec.

Písnice is home to a culinary vocational school, an elementary school Písnice, and a voluntary fire brigade. The former meat factory site has been transformed into a Vietnamese commercial, logistical, and cultural complex, known as SAPA.

The eastern part of the Modřany Gully park falls within the boundaries of the municipality.

== Transportation ==
The main thoroughfare through Písnice is Libušská street, which forms part of an important radial from Krč and Libuš, extending south towards Dolní Břežany. This radial is also the (current) eastern end of the Kunratice bypass road, which leads through some undeveloped areas towards Kunratice and Šeberov.

The village of Písnice is the historical terminus of the 113 bus line, although some buses now continue all the way to Točná. Many other lines pass through Písnice towards Dolní Břežany and points south. Yet more bus lines end in the northern part of Písnice.

=== Future ===
In 2023, the final station of the new D line metro should open in Písnice, along with a new maintenance depot for the metro, located in the Bělnice area, south of SAPA.

A new major road link between the Prague Ring Road and the planned D3 motorway should be constructed in the near future.

== Demographics ==
Historical population

Year	Pop.	±%
1869	285	—
1880	329	+15.4%
1890	361	+9.7%
1900	409	+13.3%
1910	487	+19.1%

Year	Pop.	±%
1921	464	−4.7%
1930	642	+38.4%
1950	896	+39.6%
1961	1,022	+14.1%
1970	1,007	−1.5%

Year	Pop.	±%
1980	1,051	+4.4%
1991	3,726	+254.5%
2001	4,010	+7.6%
2011	4,171	+4.0%
2021	4,497	+7.8%

Source: Censuses

== Sub-district name change controversy ==
The fact that Písnice is considerably larger than Libuš in area (3.67 km^{2} compared to 1.60 km^{2}) and only slightly less populous (4177 compared to 5525) led the district council, on March 6, 2007, to agree to the petition to change the name of the sub-district from Prague-Libuš to Prague-Libuš-Písnice (or, according to some, with slightly different spacing as Prague - Libuš-Písnice). However, changing the name of a sub-district falls within the jurisdiction of the Prague Capital Region government, who have not yet disclosed whether any such proposal was ever received or discussed.

In 1974, when Písnice was joined to Libuš, the local committee (a governing structure closely connected with the Communist era) was renamed from the committee of Libuš to the committee of Libuš-Písnice, a fact which has fueled the controversy over the name change.

== Photo gallery ==
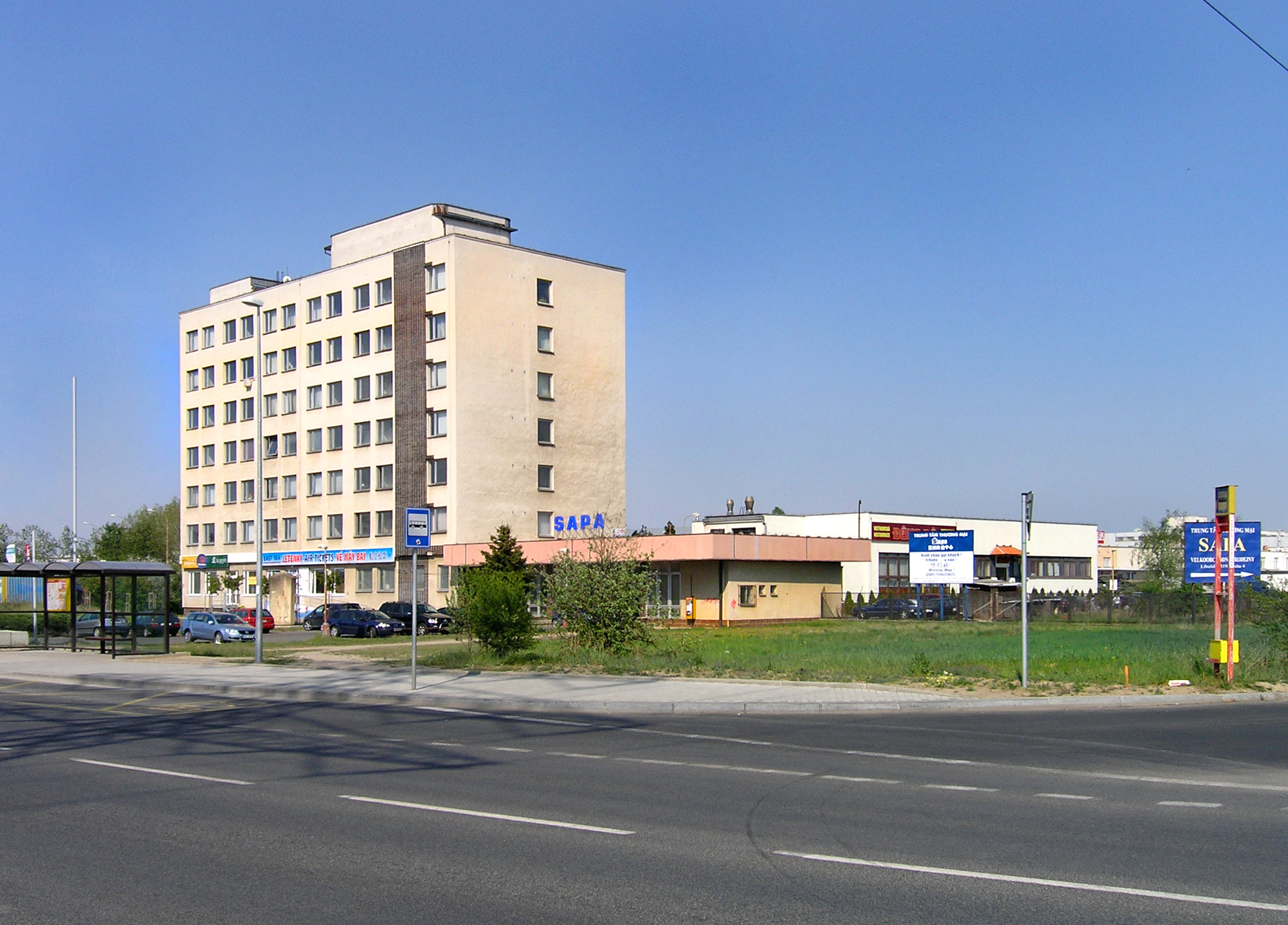
Former meat factory, now a Vietnamese community center

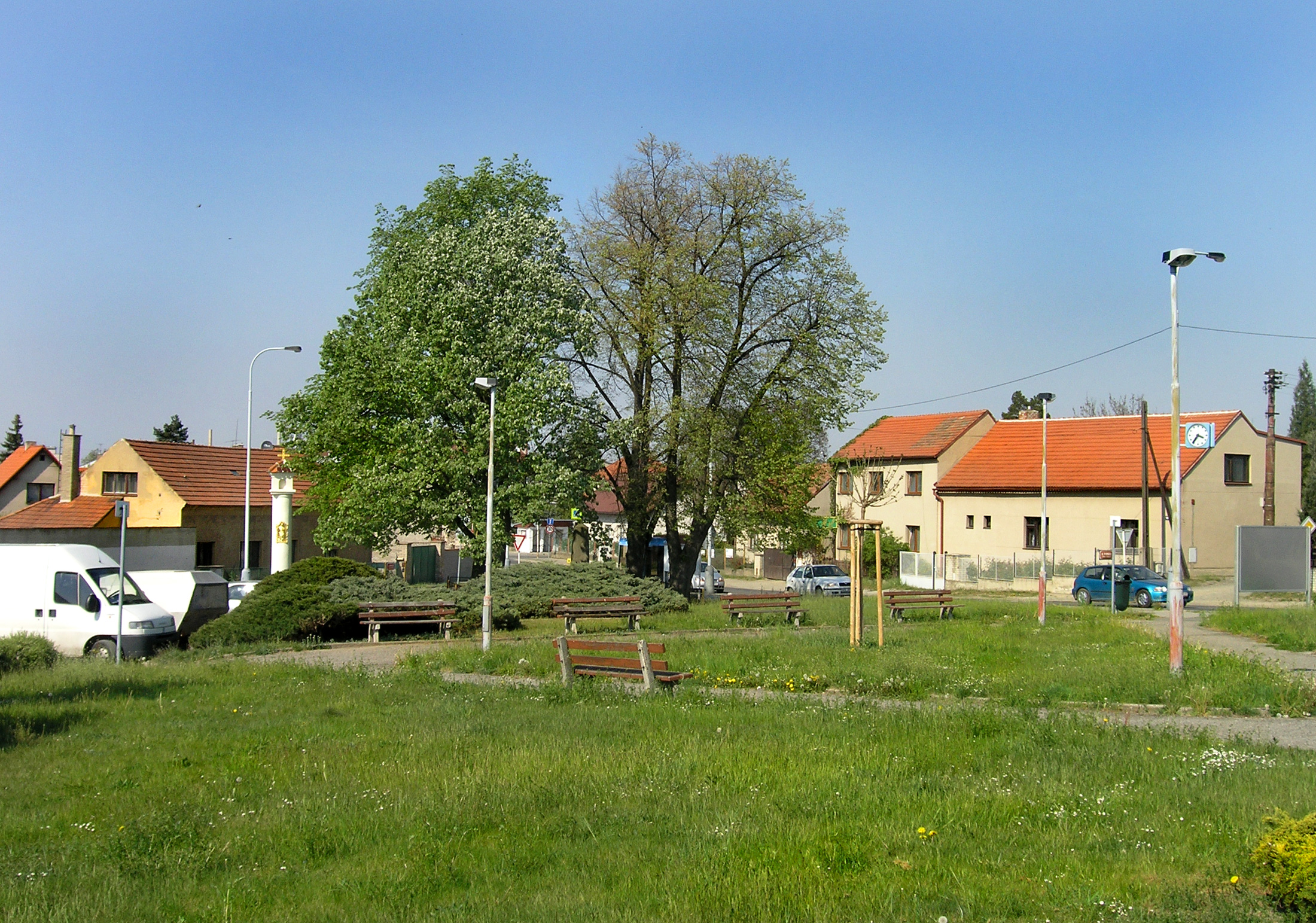
Village Commons

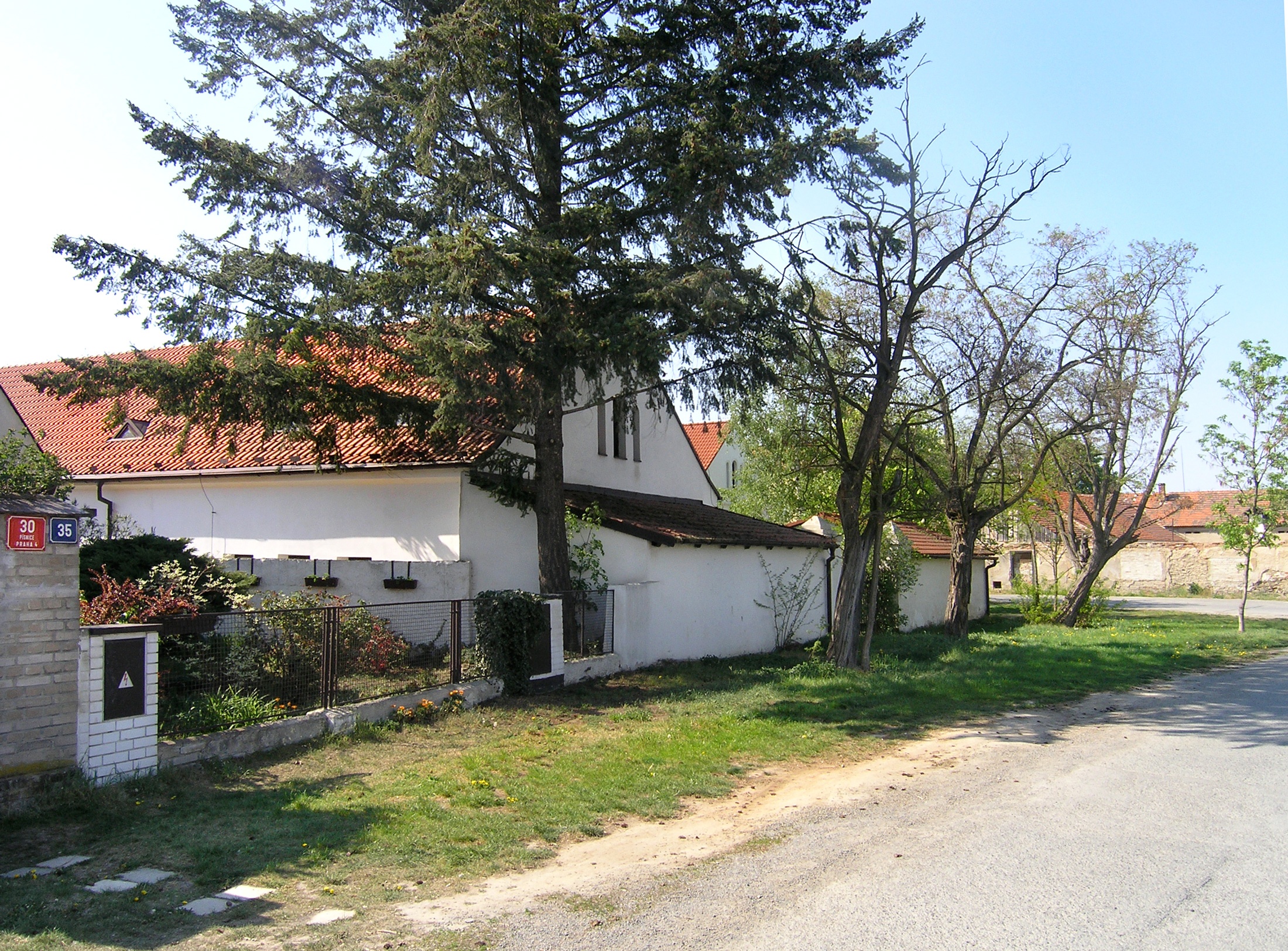
Former farm

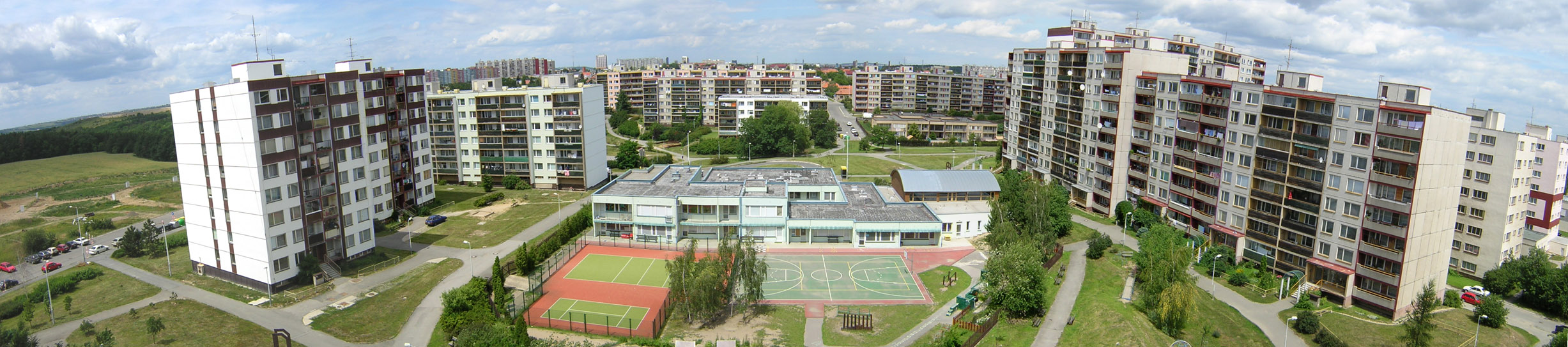
Panoramic view from the Písnice housing estate
