= Točná =

- Cadastral Area of Prague
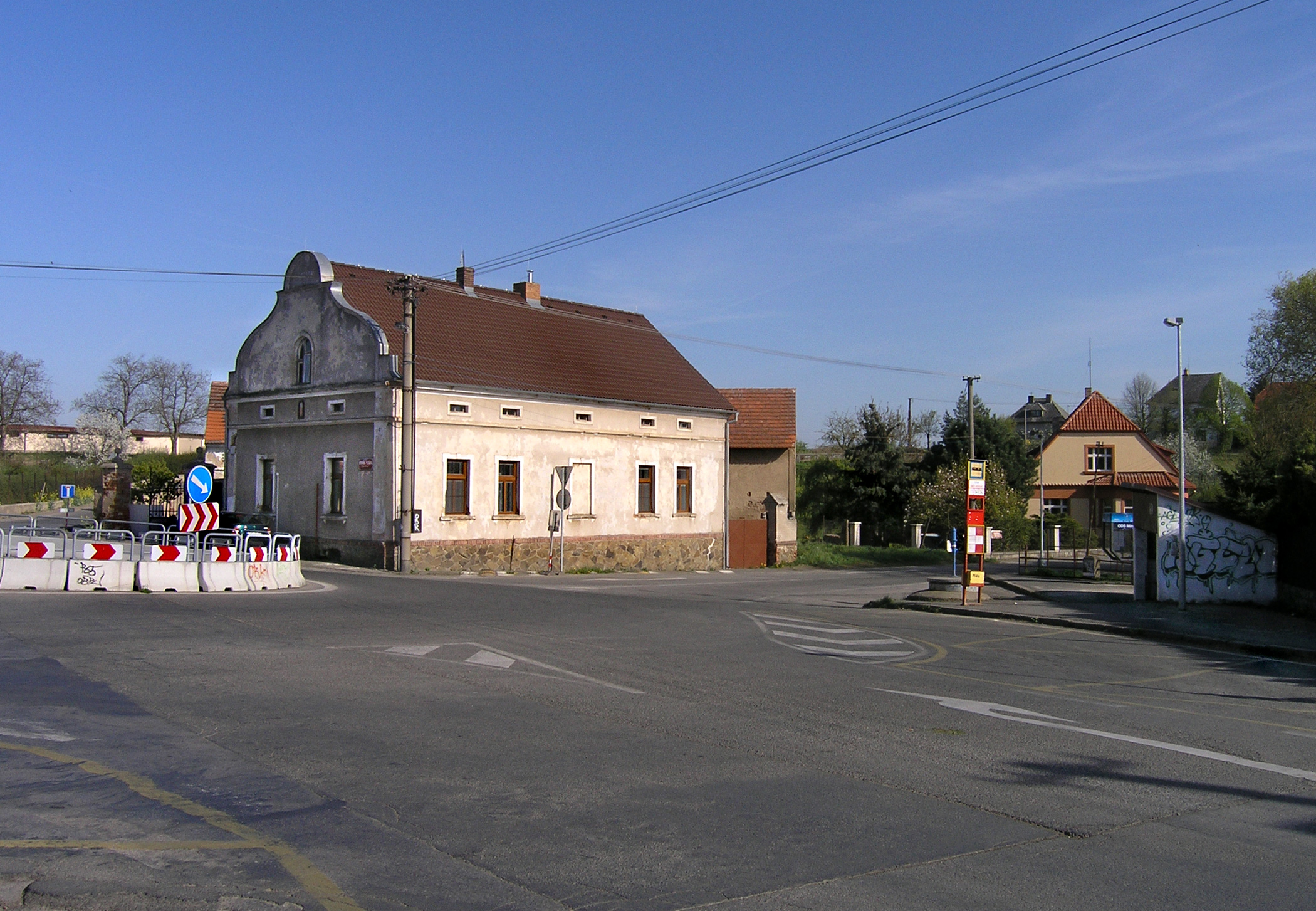
- Antonín Pecák square in Točná

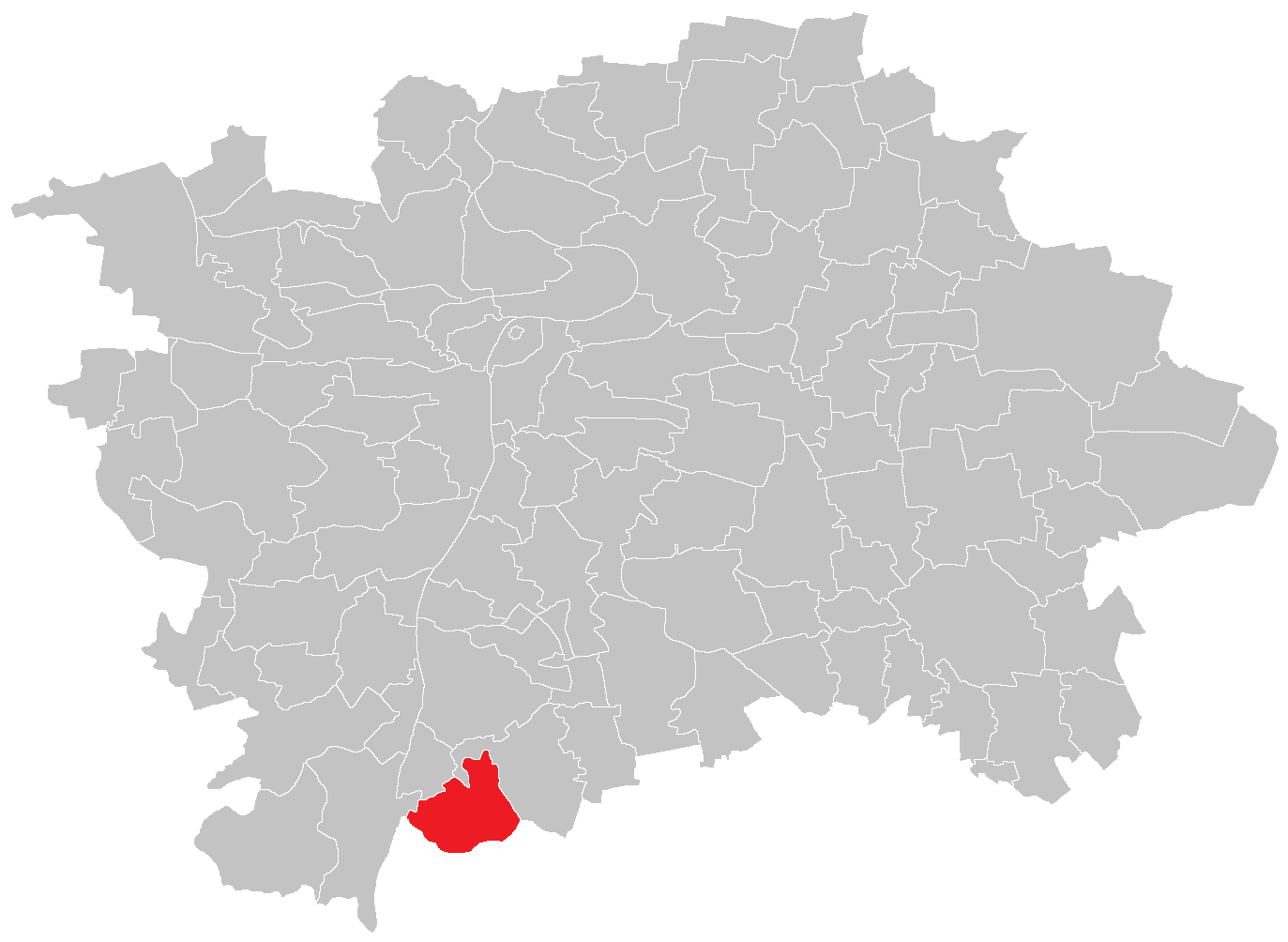
- Location of Točná in Prague
- Coordinates: 50°58′22″N 14°25′55″E
- Country: Czech Republic
- Region: Prague
- District: Prague 12

Area
  - Total: 4.63 km^{2} (1.79 sq mi)

Population (2021)
  - Total: 870
  - Density: 190/km^{2} (490/sq mi)
- Time zone: UTC+1 (CET)
  - Summer (DST): UTC+2 (CEST)
- Postal code: 143 00

Točná (German: Totschna) is a village, and a cadastral subdivision of the municipal district of Prague 12. There are 31 streets and 413 addresses registered, and a population of 679.

The village lies just north of Prague's southern border, formed by the Břežaný valley, south-west of Cholupice, north-west of the municipality of Dolní Břežany. Between Točná and the Vltava river to the west is a protected forest. A private airport is located within the northern part of the village limits, near the area called Nouzov. The northern part of the village limits are bisected by Prague's Outer Ring Road, which then submerges into a tunnel just south of the airport.

Bus line 113 terminates in the village, and line 341 passes through it.

The village has a football pitch, home of the TJ Točná football club. It also has a nursery school, one of the largest second-hand clothing stores in Prague, three automotive repair shops and a garden centre. In 2014, a pub, Hospoda na Točné, opened on Branišovská street.

== History ==
From its formation in 1850, Komořany estate and surrounding buildings and greater part of Závist was part of the political municipality of Točná. All this locations has belonged together since the times when Komořany belonged the Zbraslav monastery. After World War II Komořany rise to village and became an independent municipality, detaching from Točná. Závist was also separated and newly belongs to Zbraslav. Starting in 1947, the local government of Modřany sought the transfer of the territory of Točná to Modřany. In 1960, the municipality of Točná was merged into the municipality of Cholupice. In 1974, Cholupice was joined to the Capital City of Prague. In 1976, the local government in Cholupice was dissolved, and both villages were attached to the local government in Modřany, which is now part of Prague 12. A remnant of the local committee system (Czech: Místní národní výbor, "local national committee") in Točná is the street K výboru ("towards the committee"), which was named in 1974.

== Protected forest ==
The hilly, forested area to the west of the village, bordered by the Břežaný creek, and the communities of Závist, Komořany and Nouzov, is a protected habitat. The vague outlines of a Celtic oppidum are visible in the high area called Šance. A large plaque commemorating the entomologist František Antonín Nickerl overlooks the Břežaný valley. The forest's steep trails have, in recent years, become popular among mountain bikers.

The forest is bisected by the Branišovská switchback, which is limited to light vehicle traffic. Despite traversing a protected area, the road has been used several times as part of a rally race from Zbraslav to Točná.

== Demographics ==
Historical population

Year	Pop.	±%
1869	344	—
1880	295	−14.2%
1890	355	+20.3%
1900	379	+6.8%
1910	317	−16.4%

Year	Pop.	±%
1921	371	+17.0%
1930	498	+34.2%
1950	1,215	+144.0%
1961	416	−65.8%
1970	355	−14.7%

Year	Pop.	±%
1980	425	+19.7%
1991	801	+88.5%
2001	566	−29.3%
2011	793	+40.1%
2021	870	+9.7%

Source: Censuses

== Community events ==
The village celebrates several annual events:

- January 6 - Three Kings - a charity collection drive organized by the Catholic church, in which donators are rewarded with a chalk inscription of 'K+M+B' (from the names of the Biblical Magi)) above a doorway or on a fencepost
- Lent - Carnival - a charity collection drive organized by the local football club, involving a costume parade
- Spring - Welcoming of Spring - a pageant put on by the local nursery school, culminating in the symbolic drowning of an effigy of winter
- Mid-June - St. Anthony's Fair - an all-day event featuring exhibitions, rides, contests and raffles, and live music, organized by the local community association
- Early September - Iron Kelt - a race uphill in the protected forest, 330m long with a rise of 40m
- November 11 - St. Martin's Day - St. Martin, a Roman soldier, arrives on a horse, and shares his cloak with a beggar; the gathered crowd then parades through the village behind St. Martin, chanting; the parade terminates in an open field, where poppy-seed pastries are handed out, and everyone is encouraged to share the pastry with another attendee, following the example of St. Martin
- Advent - a pageant put on by the local nursery school, followed by the lighting of the village Christmas tree

== Photo gallery ==
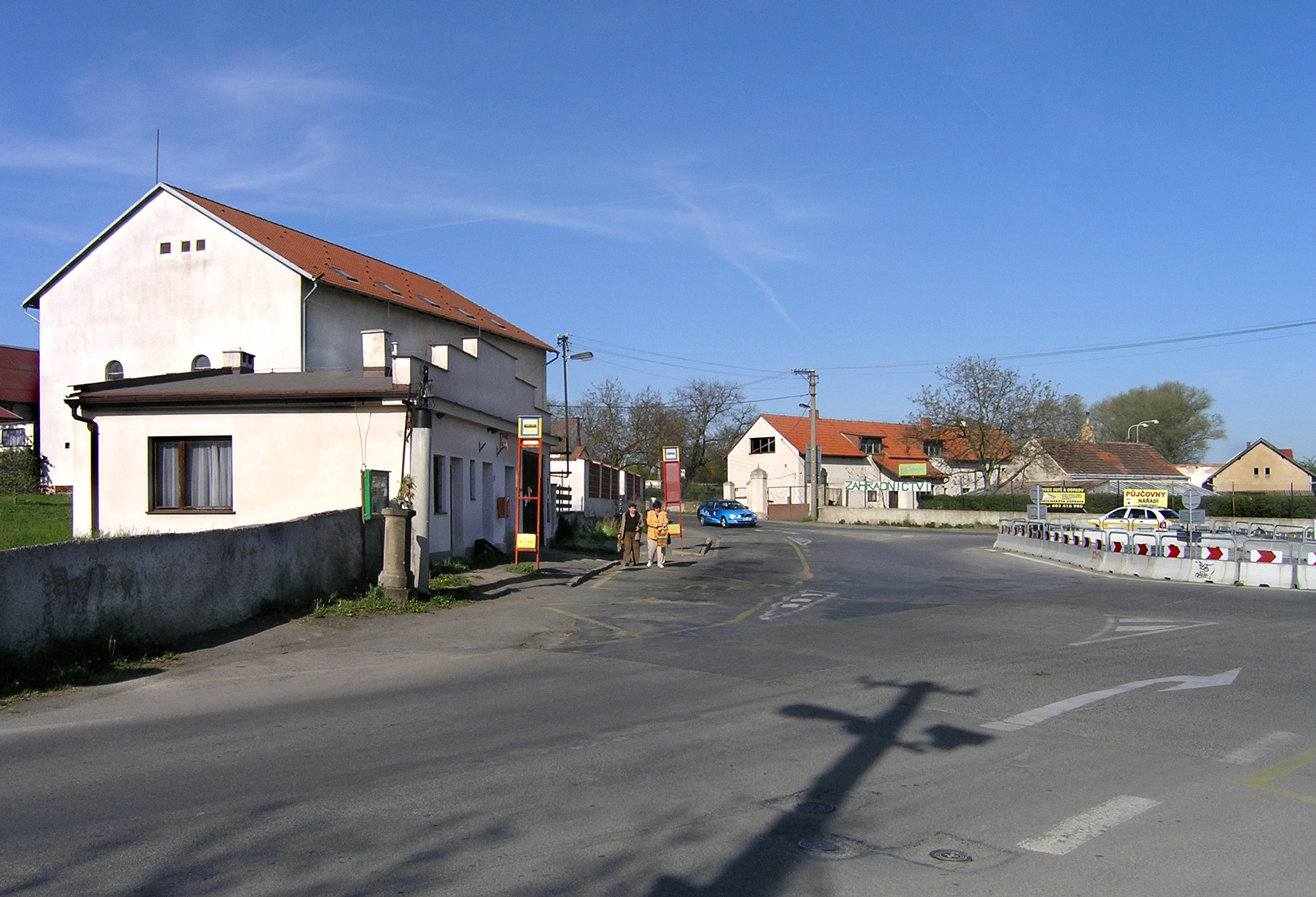
Točná's bus stop

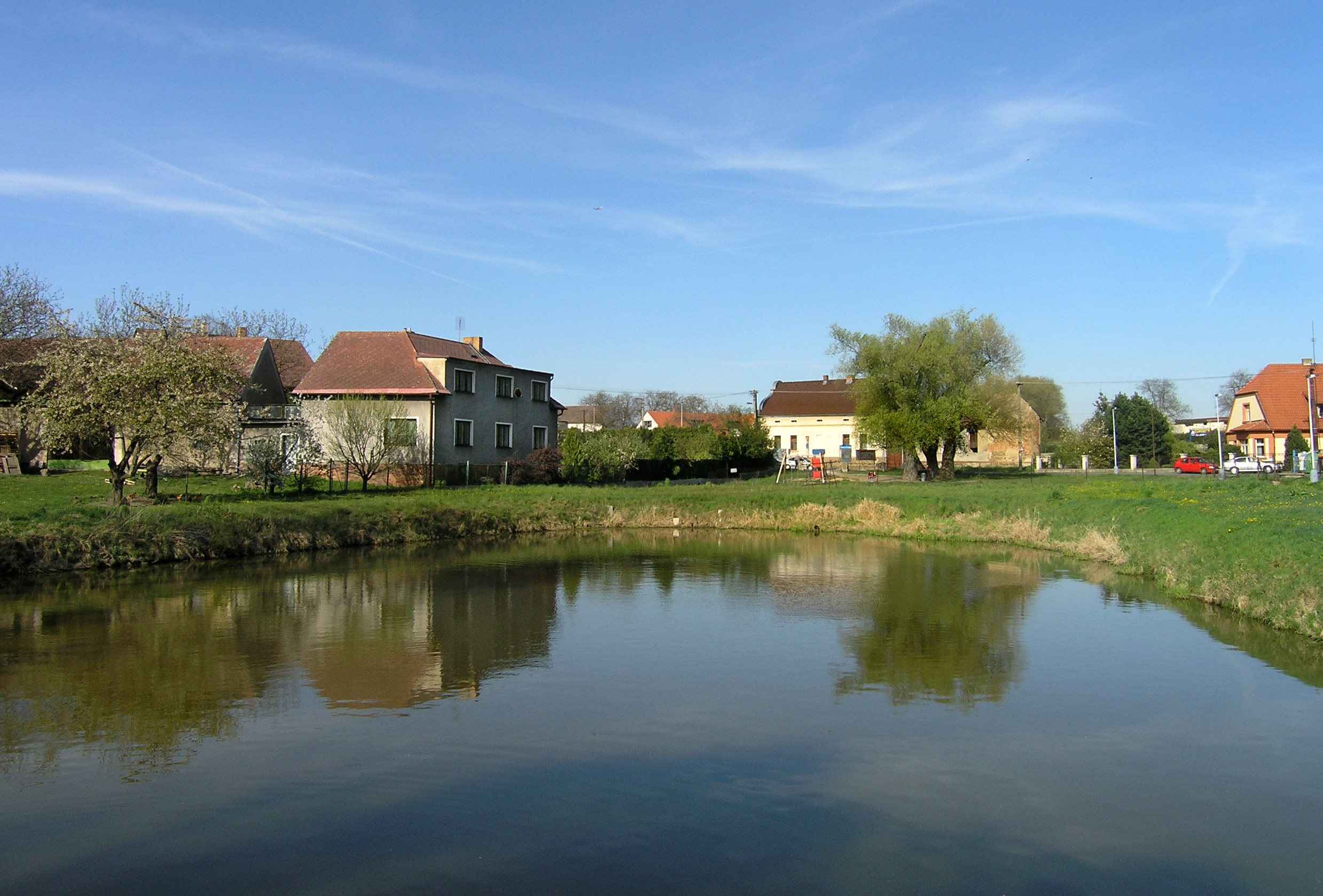
Village pond

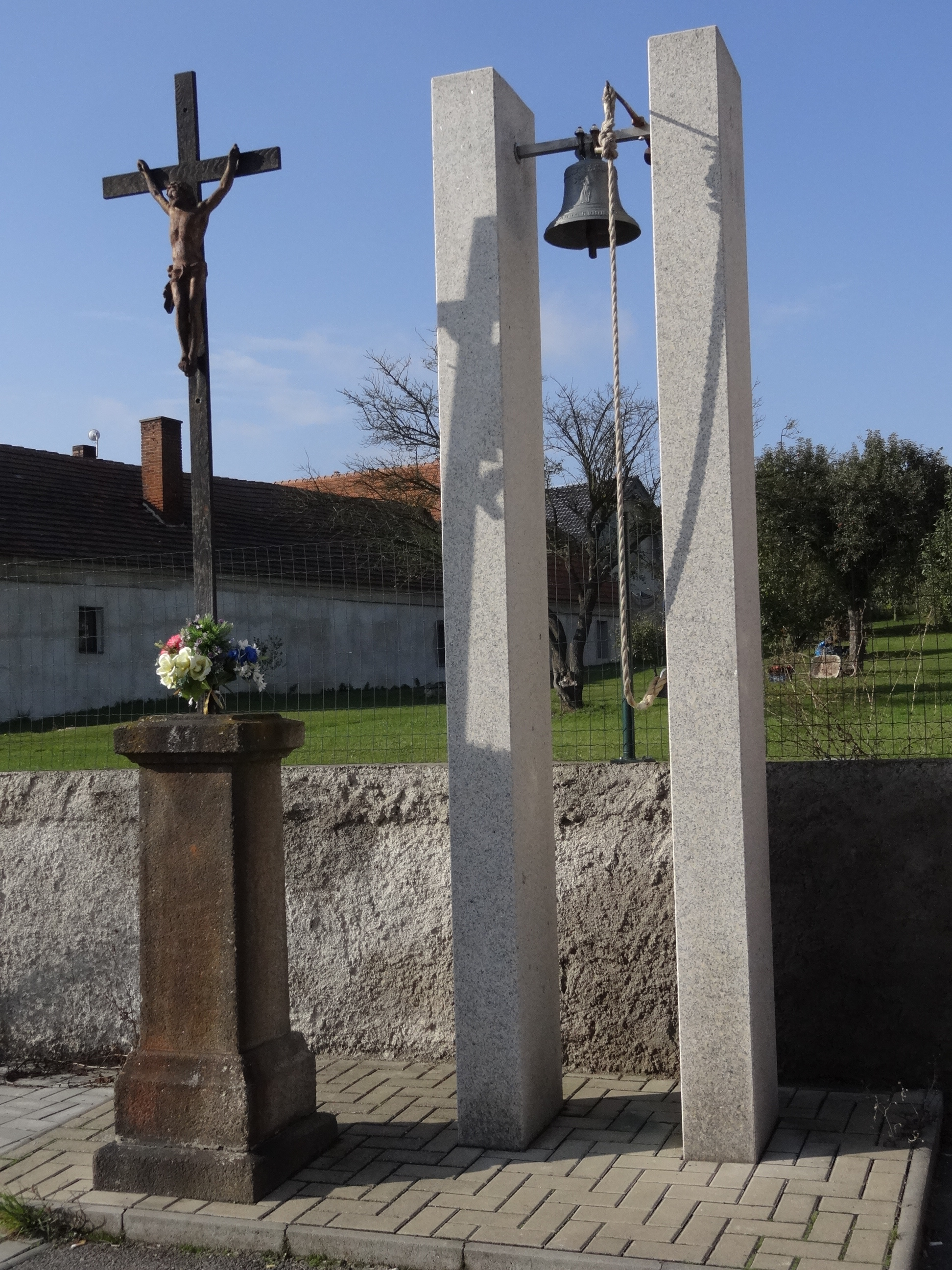
Cross and bell in the village square

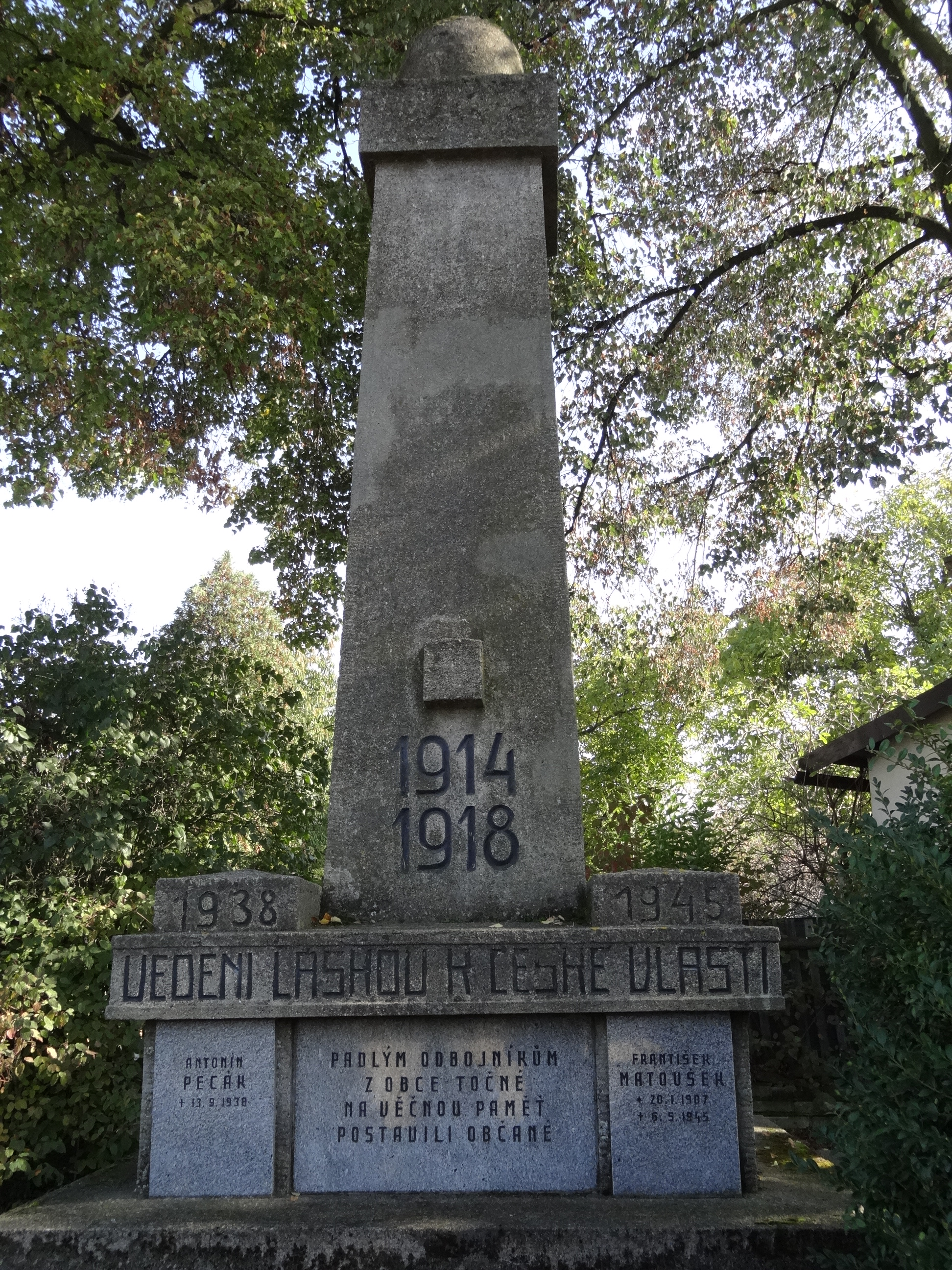
Memorial on the corner of K Výboru and Ke Spálence streets

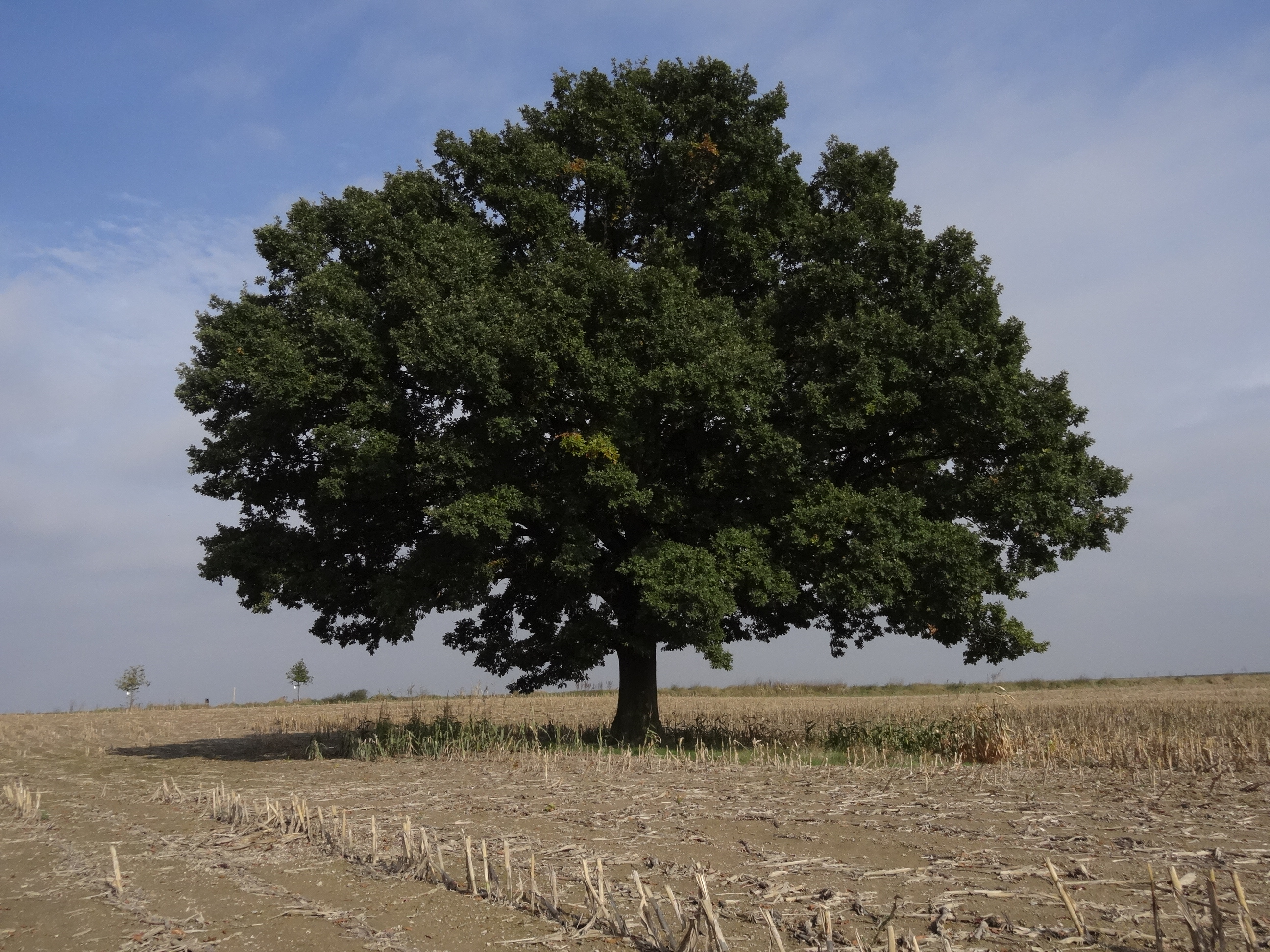
Memorial oak tree in the fields between Točná and Cholupice

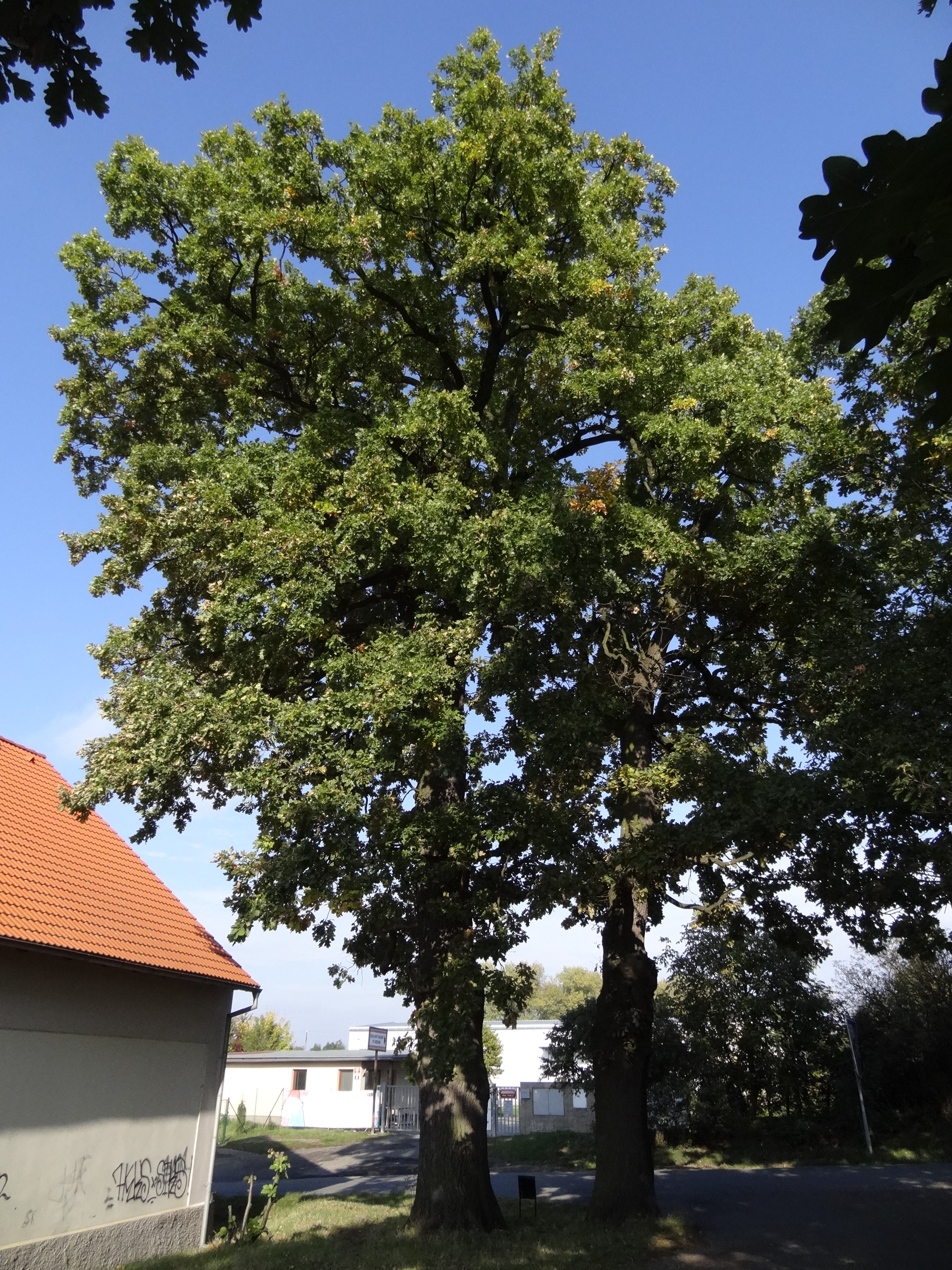
Memorial oak trees on the corner of Branišovská and K Výboru streets

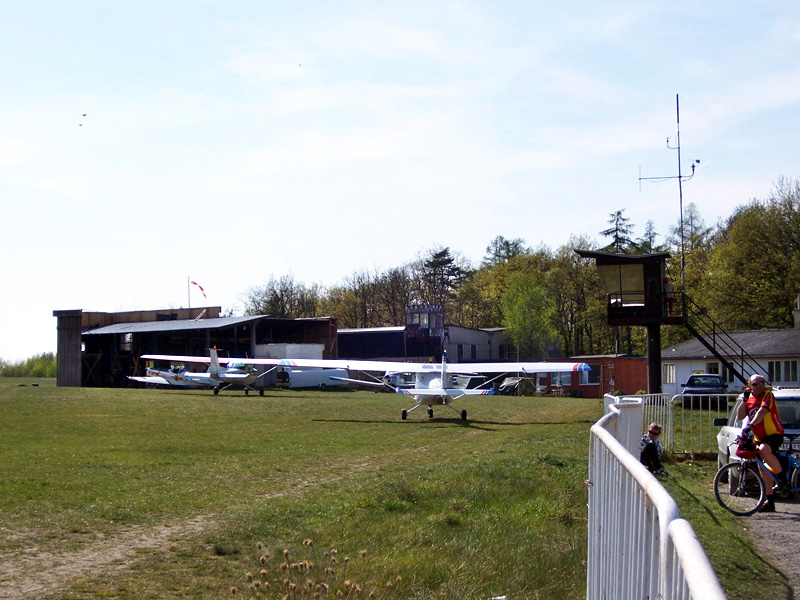
Prague Točná Airport

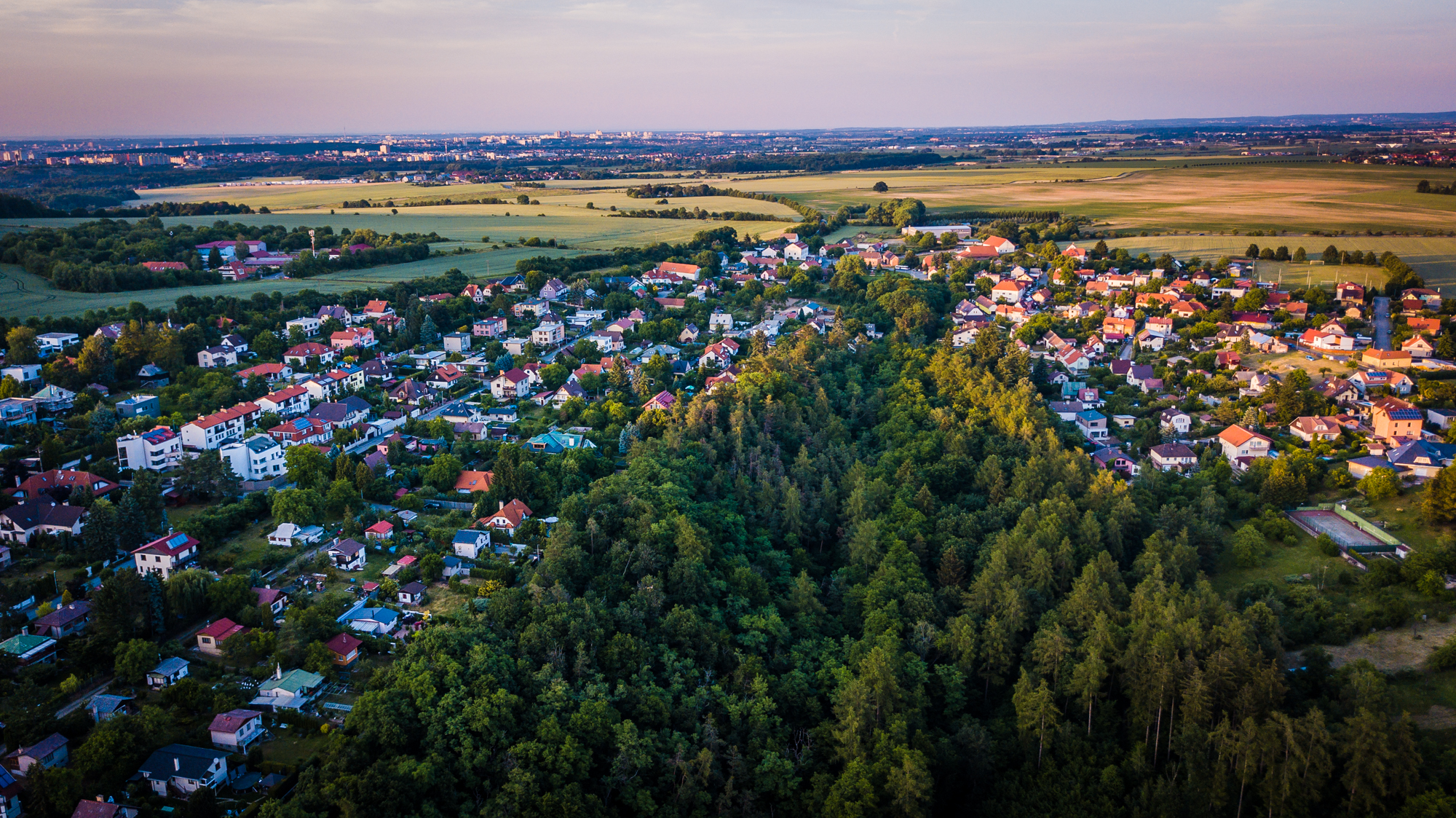
Aerial photo of Točná from above the gully

== Famous Residents ==
- Jiří Kodet - Czech actor
- Karel Vítězslav Mašek – Czech painter
- Jiří Tichota – Czech musician
