= Prague-Libuš =

Municipal district of Prague, Czech Republic

- Municipal District of Prague
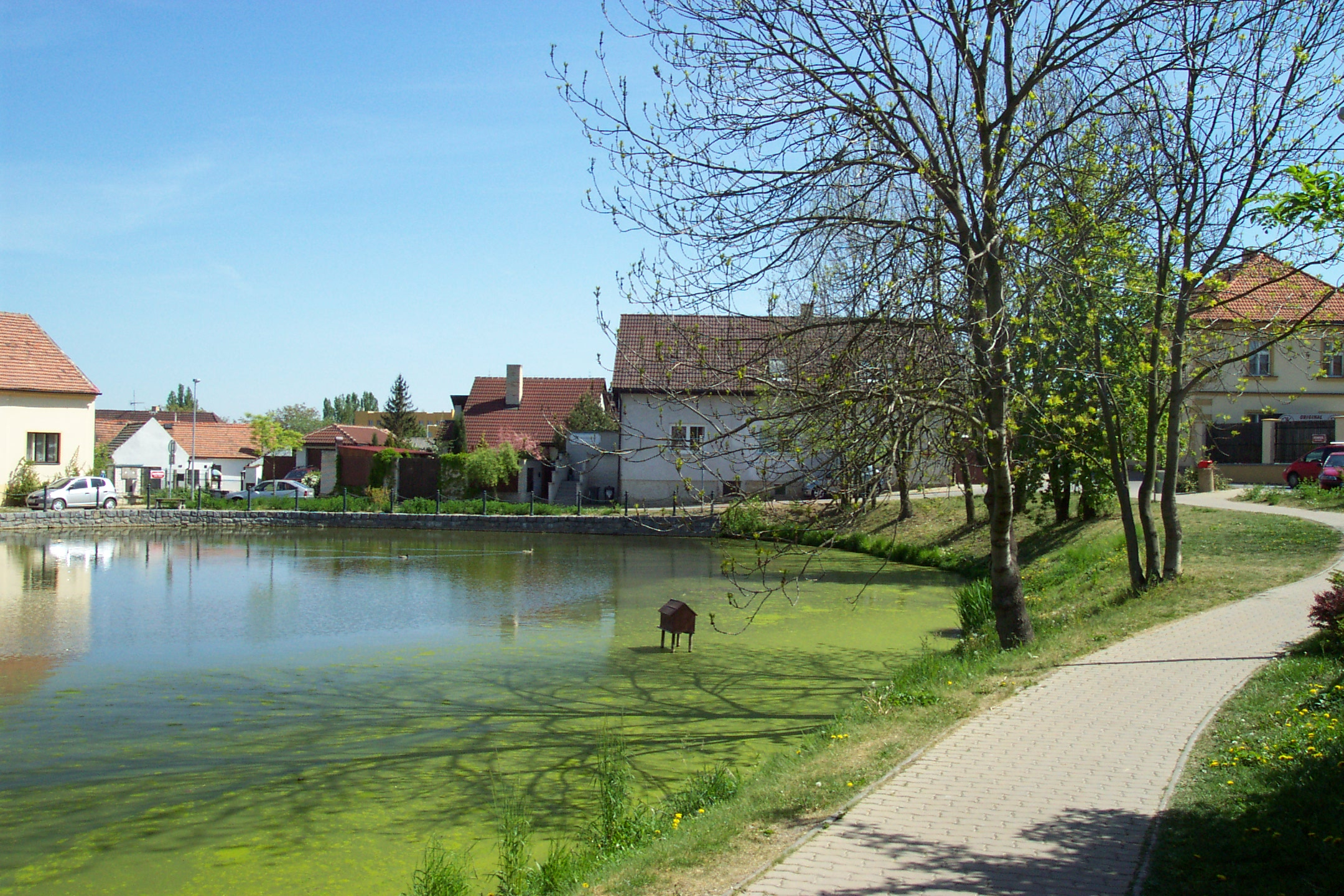
- Pond in Prague-Zličín

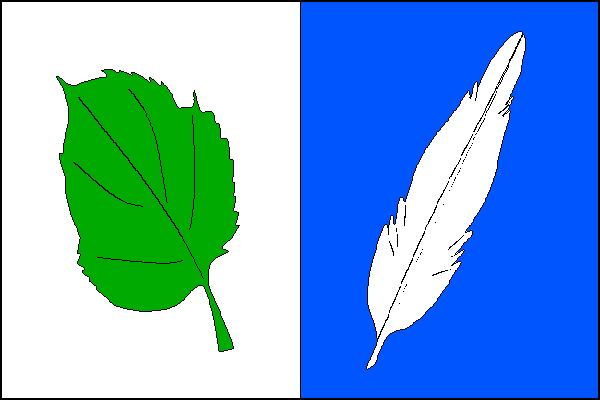
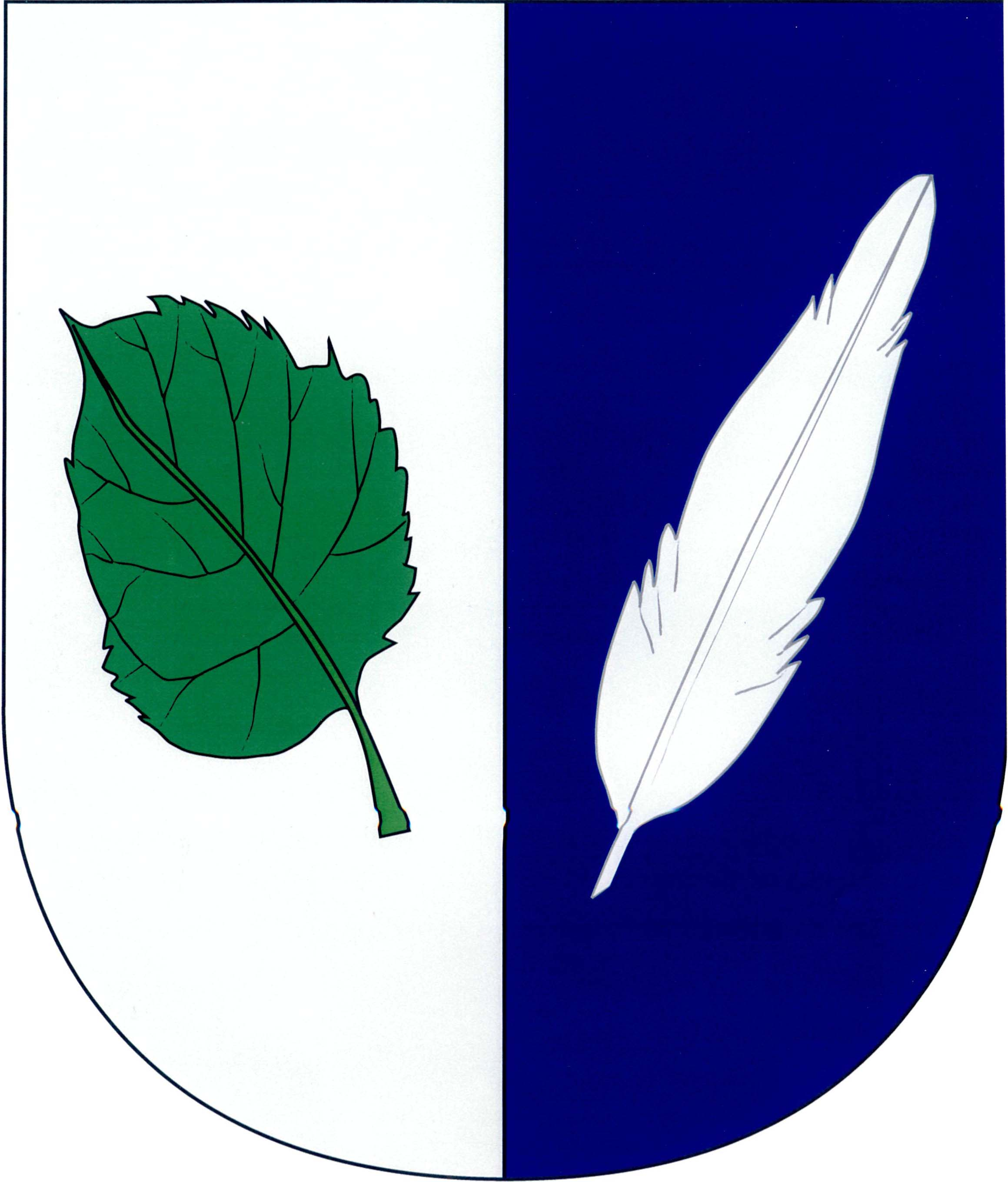
- Flag Coat of arms

- Location of Prague-Libuš in Prague
- Coordinates: 50.009167°N 14.462222°E
- Country: Czech Republic
- Region: Prague
- Administrative district: Prague 12
- Municipal district: Prague 4

Area
  - Total: 5.24 km^{2} (2.02 sq mi)

Population (2021)
  - Total: 10,037
  - Density: 1,920/km^{2} (4,960/sq mi)
- Time zone: UTC+1 (CET)
  - Summer (DST): UTC+2 (CEST)
- Postal code: 142 00

Prague-Libuš is a district in Prague, Czech Republic. It is situated in the southern part of the city, in the administrative district Prague 12. The cadastral area Libuš is part of this district.
