= Cholupice =

- Cadastral Area of Prague
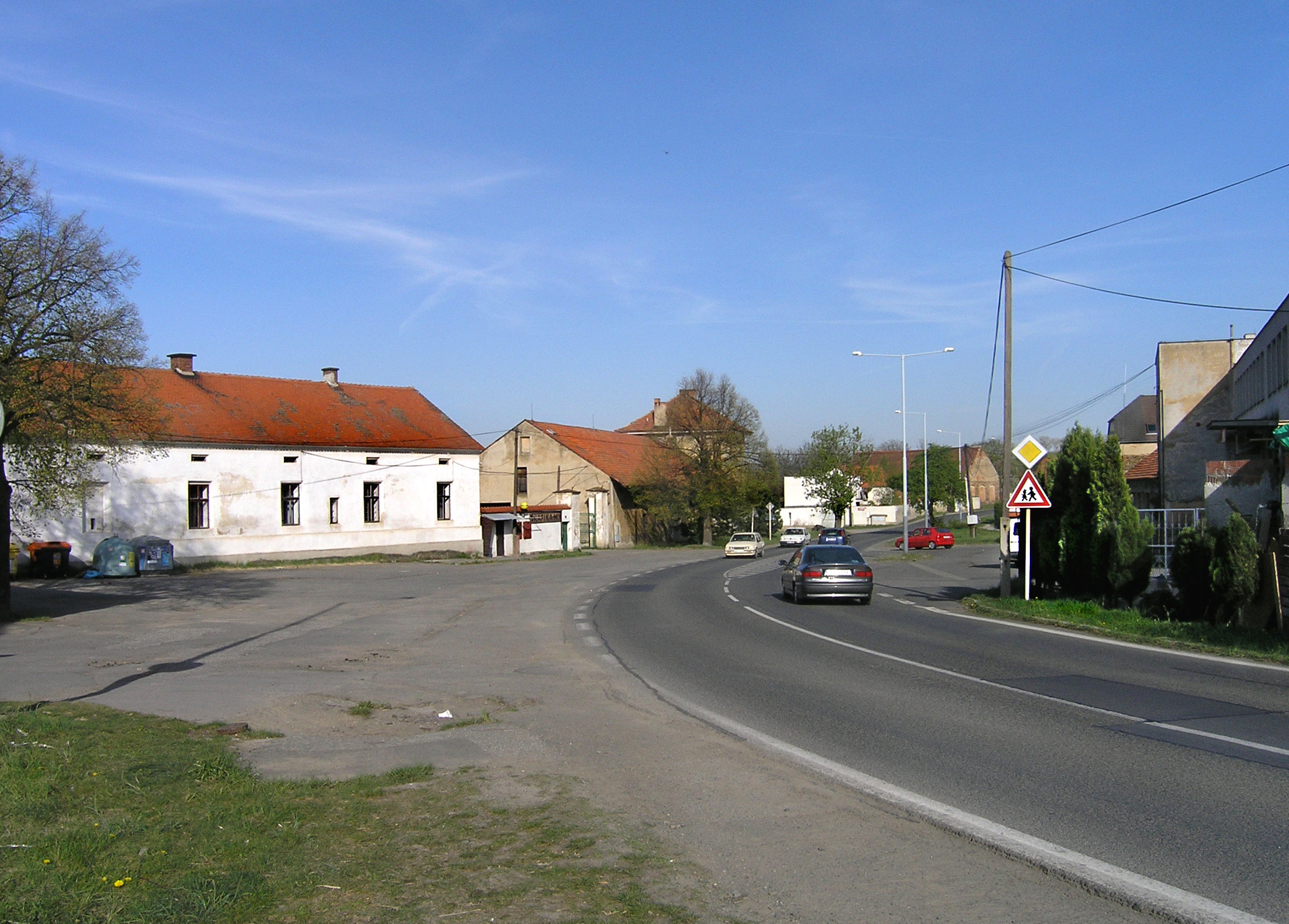
- Village square

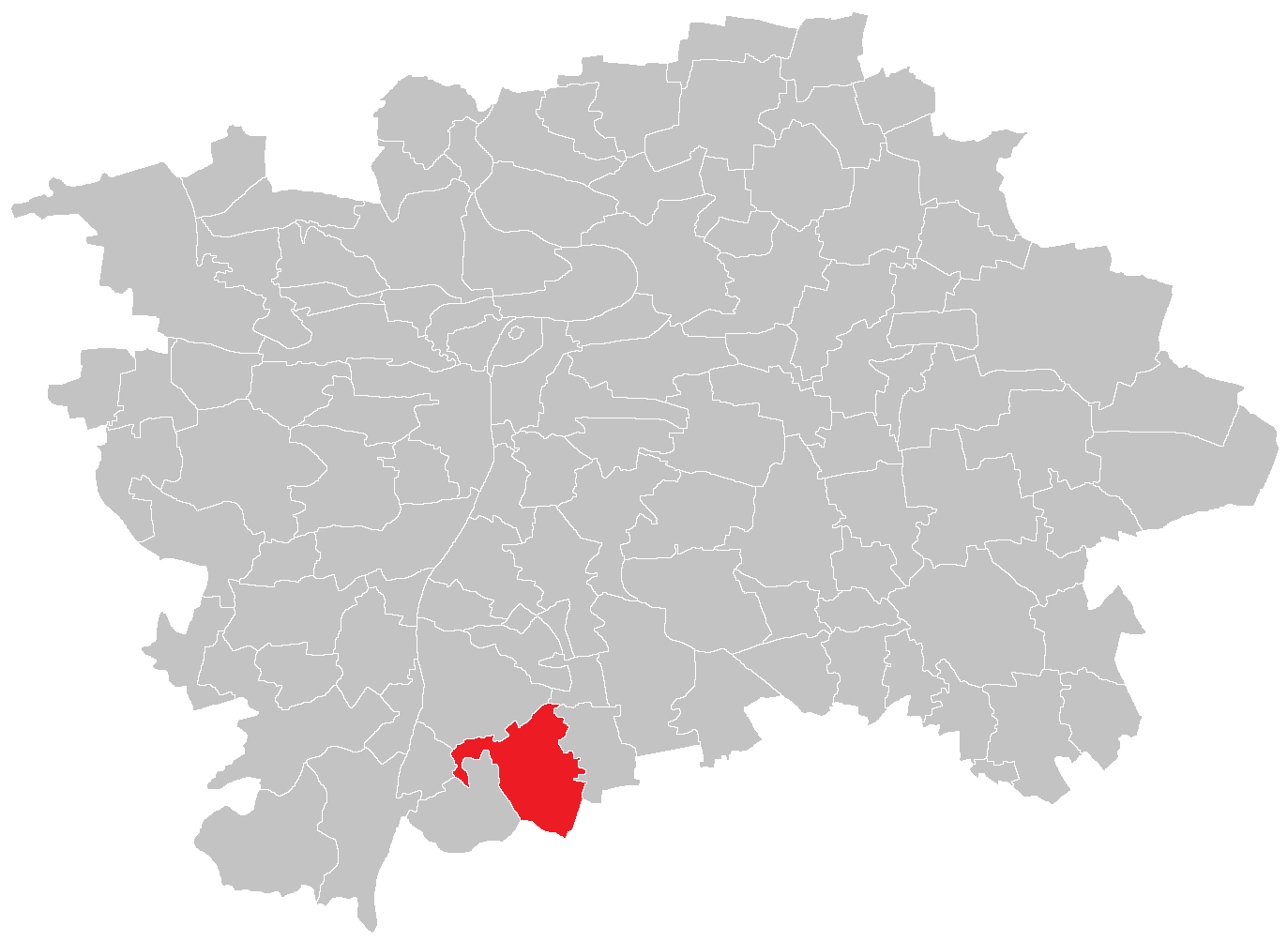
- Location of Cholupice in Prague
- Coordinates: 50°59′12″N 14°26′55″E
- Country: Czech Republic
- Region: Prague
- District: Prague 12

Area
  - Total: 6.39 km^{2} (2.47 sq mi)

Population (2021)
  - Total: 1,133
  - Density: 177/km^{2} (459/sq mi)
- Time zone: UTC+1 (CET)
  - Summer (DST): UTC+2 (CEST)

Cholupice (German: Cholupitz) a village in the south of Prague and a cadastral subdivision of Prague 12. There are 18 streets and 165 addresses registered, and a population of around 600. The Outer Ring Road passes just south of the village, and to the south-west there is a recreational airport. The Cholupice Cemetery lies to the east.

Cholupice was, at one time, an independent municipality. The village of Točná was joined to Cholupice in 1960. The municipality of Cholupice, including Točná, was amalgamated into the city of Prague in 1974. The local government in Cholupice was dissolved, and both villages were attached to the local government in Modřany, which is now part of Prague 12.

Every year on 30 April, near Ke Kálku street at the eastern end of the village, Cholupice hosts Prague's largest symbolic witch burning celebration. The village also has several clubs and community associations, including a volunteer fire brigade, a hunt club, an athletic club TJ Sokol Cholupice, a branch of the Czech Husbandry Association Svaz Českých chovatelů, a horse-riding club and a fishing club. On a Saturday in the second half of May, the village hosts a traditional Welcoming of Spring celebration (Czech: vítání jara), including the raising of a maypole, and a parade through the village wearing folk costumes (Czech: kroj).

== Demographics ==
Historical population

Year	Pop.	±%
1869	205	—
1880	245	+19.5%
1890	259	+5.7%
1900	252	−2.7%
1910	276	+9.5%
1921	301	+9.1%
1930	410	+36.2%
1950	336	−18.0%

Year	Pop.	±%
1961	375	+11.6%
1970	416	+10.9%
1980	443	+6.5%
1991	401	−9.5%
2001	420	+4.7%
2011	530	+26.2%
2021	1,133	+113.8%

Source: Censuses

== Photo gallery ==
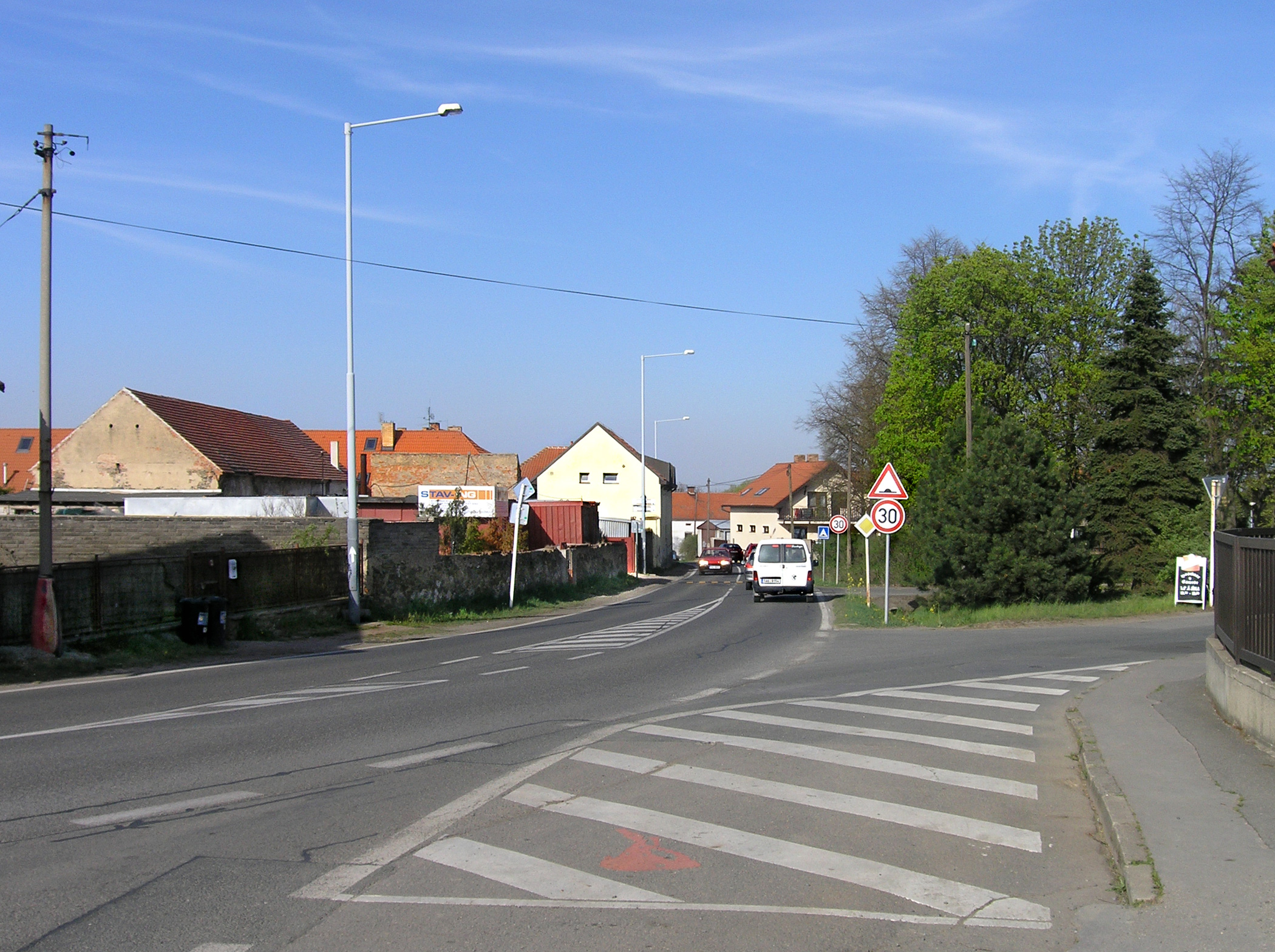
Podchýšská Street, towards Písnice

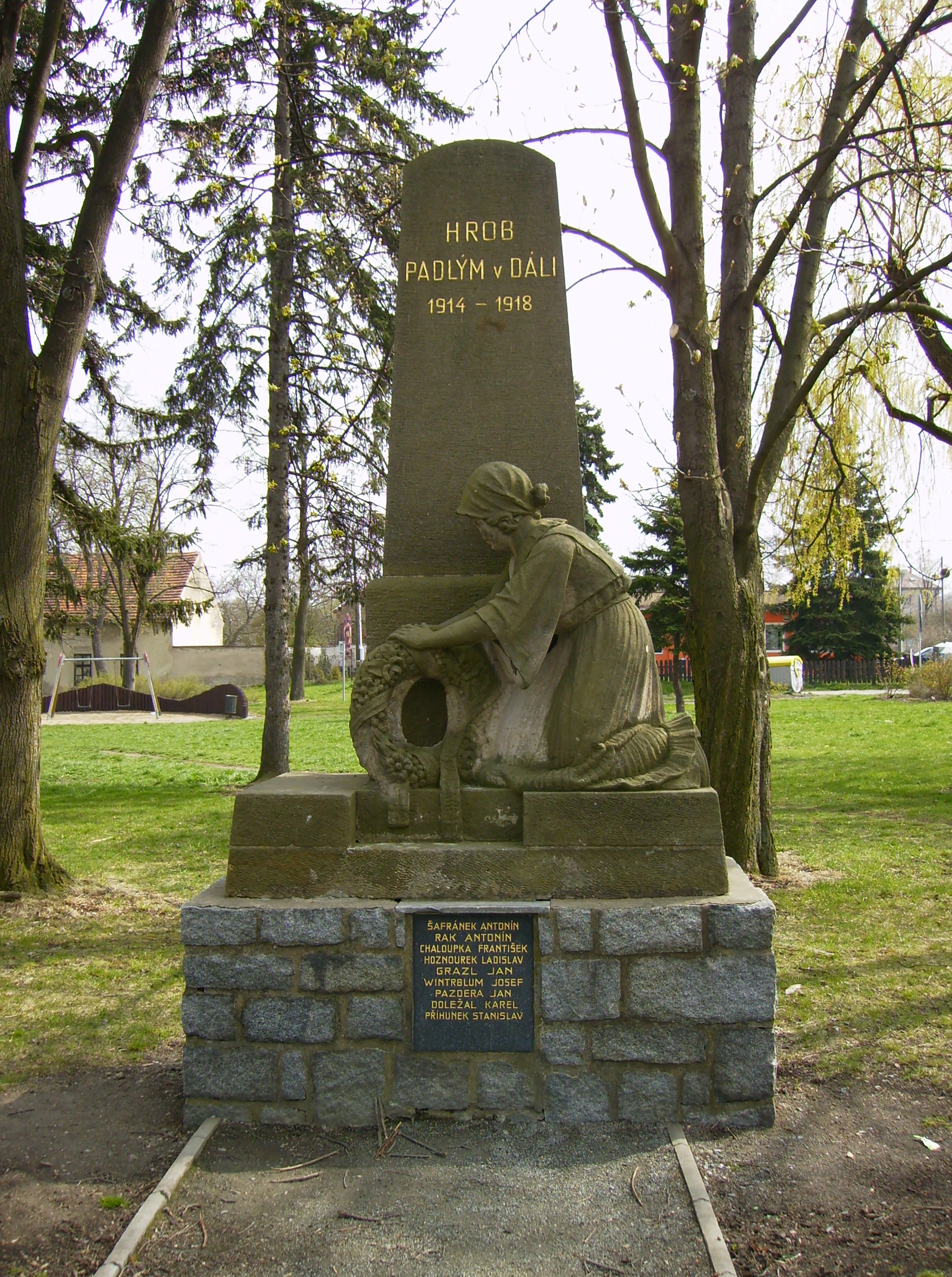
Memorial to the fallen of World War I

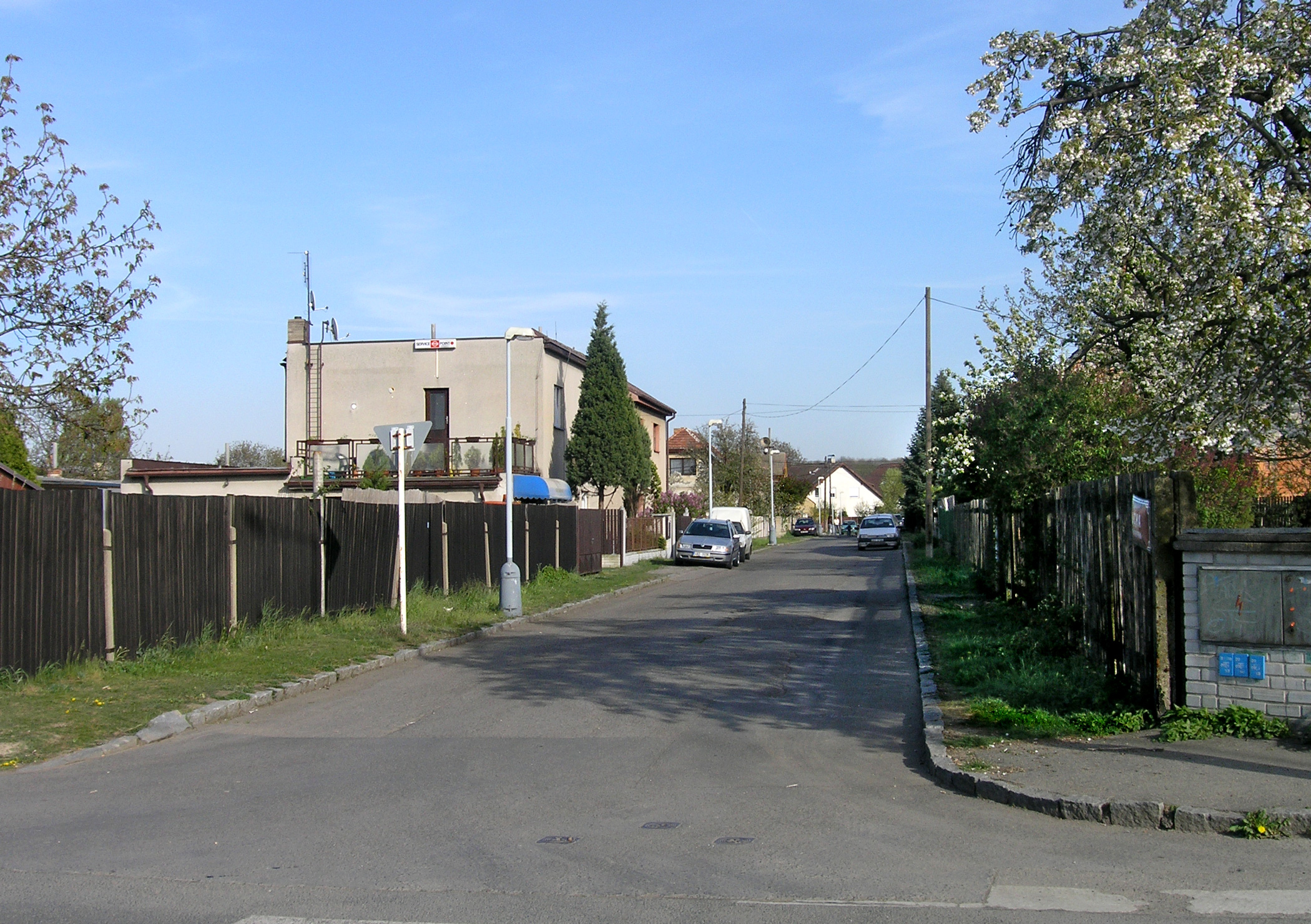
Lichá Street ("Odd Street") - there is no street in Prague named Sudá ("Even")
