= Kamýk (Prague) =

- Municipal District of Prague; Cadastral Area of Prague
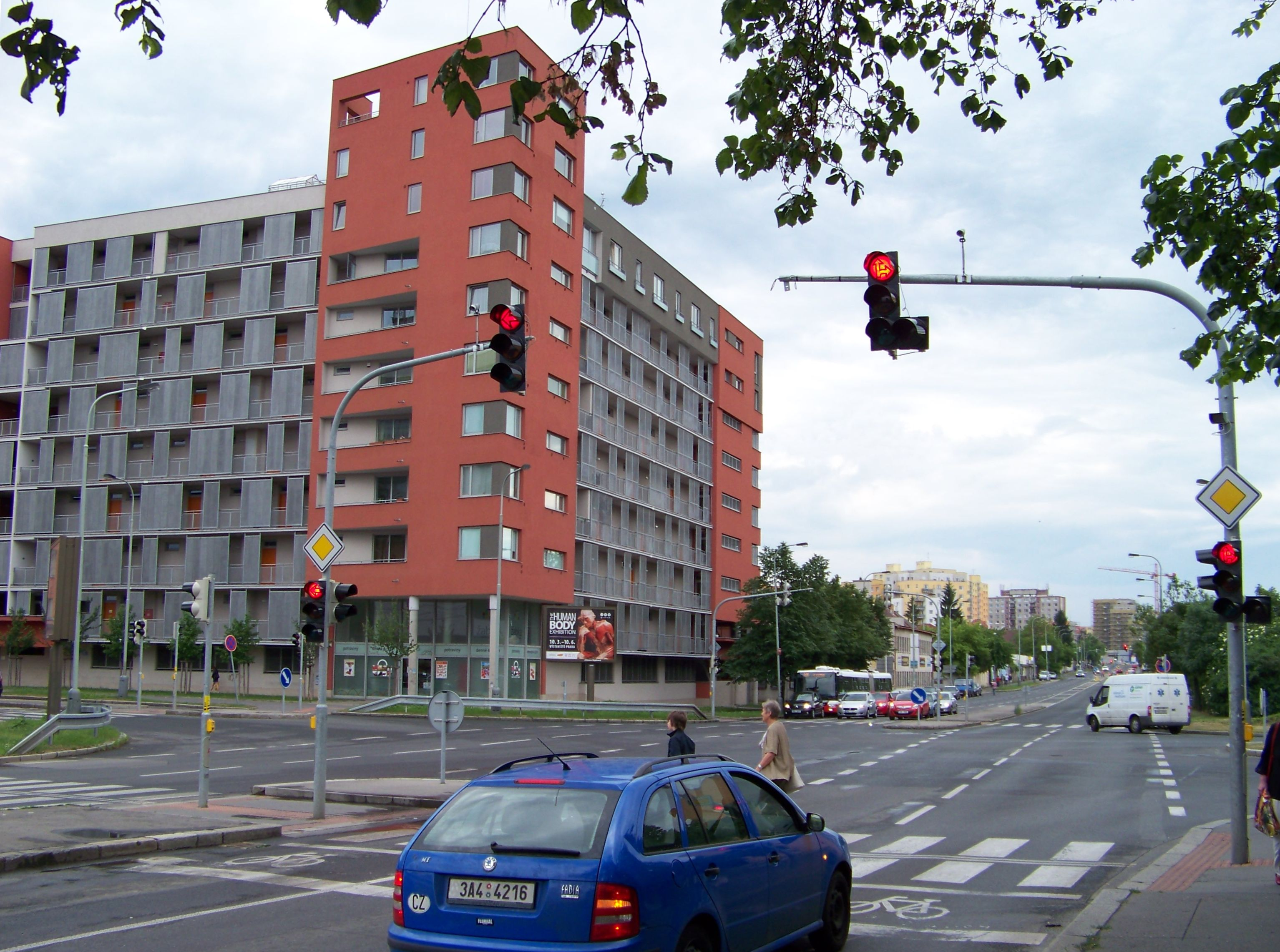
- Novodvorská street in Kamýk

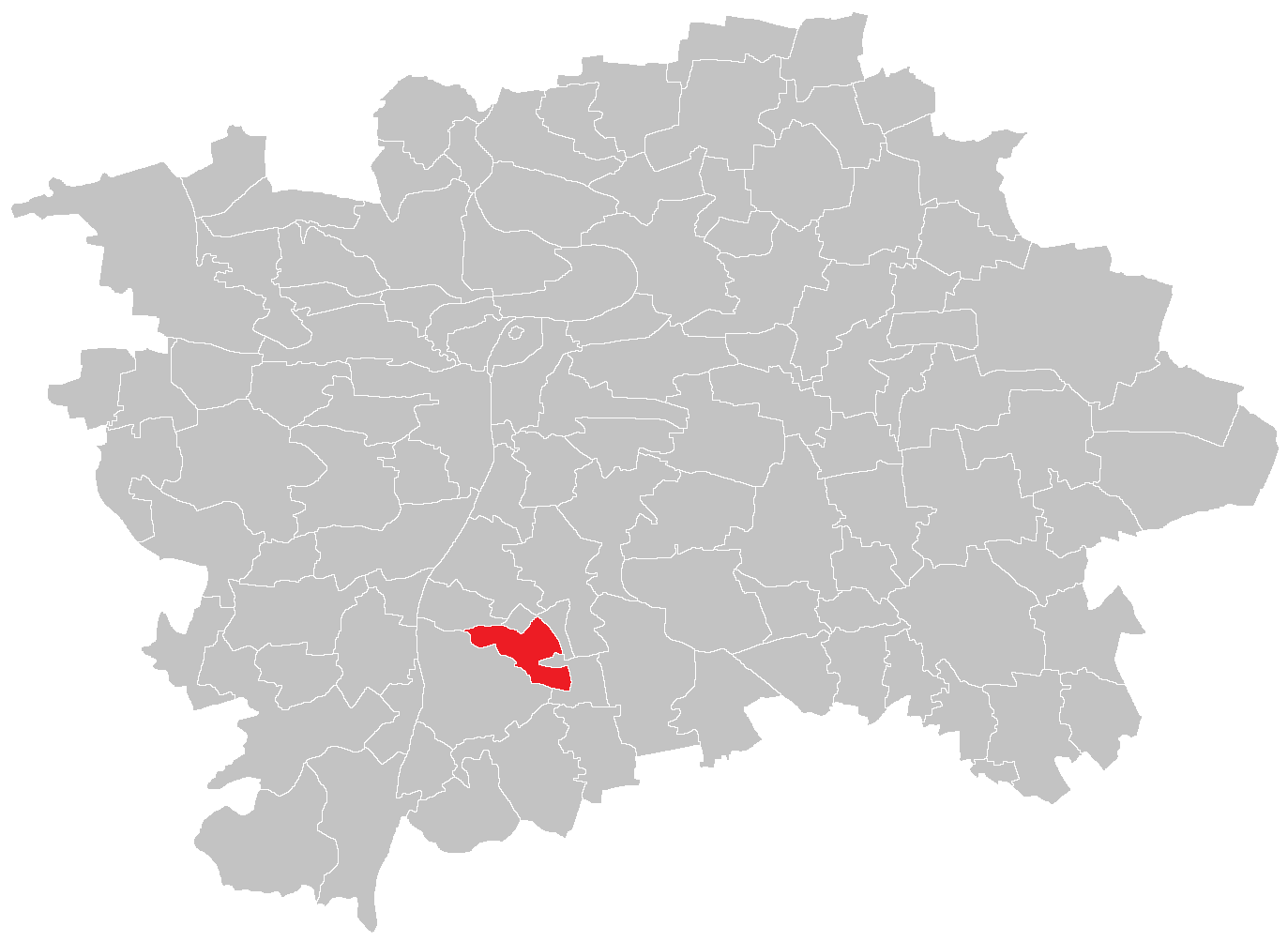
- Location of Kamýk in Prague
- Coordinates: 50.0153°N 14.4383°E
- Country: Czech Republic
- Region: Prague, the Capital City

Area
  - Total: 2.54 km^{2} (0.98 sq mi)

Population (2021)
  - Total: 19,129
  - Density: 7,530/km^{2} (19,500/sq mi)
- Time zone: UTC+1 (CET)
  - Summer (DST): UTC+2 (CEST)
- Postal code: 142 00 and 143 00

Kamýk is a city part and cadastral area in Prague, Czech Republic. It is situated in the southern part of the city, and is part of the administrative district Prague 12 in the municipal district Prague 4. It is named after a local forest of the same name, the word kamýk is derived from the Czech word kámen, meaning stone.
