= Točná Airport =

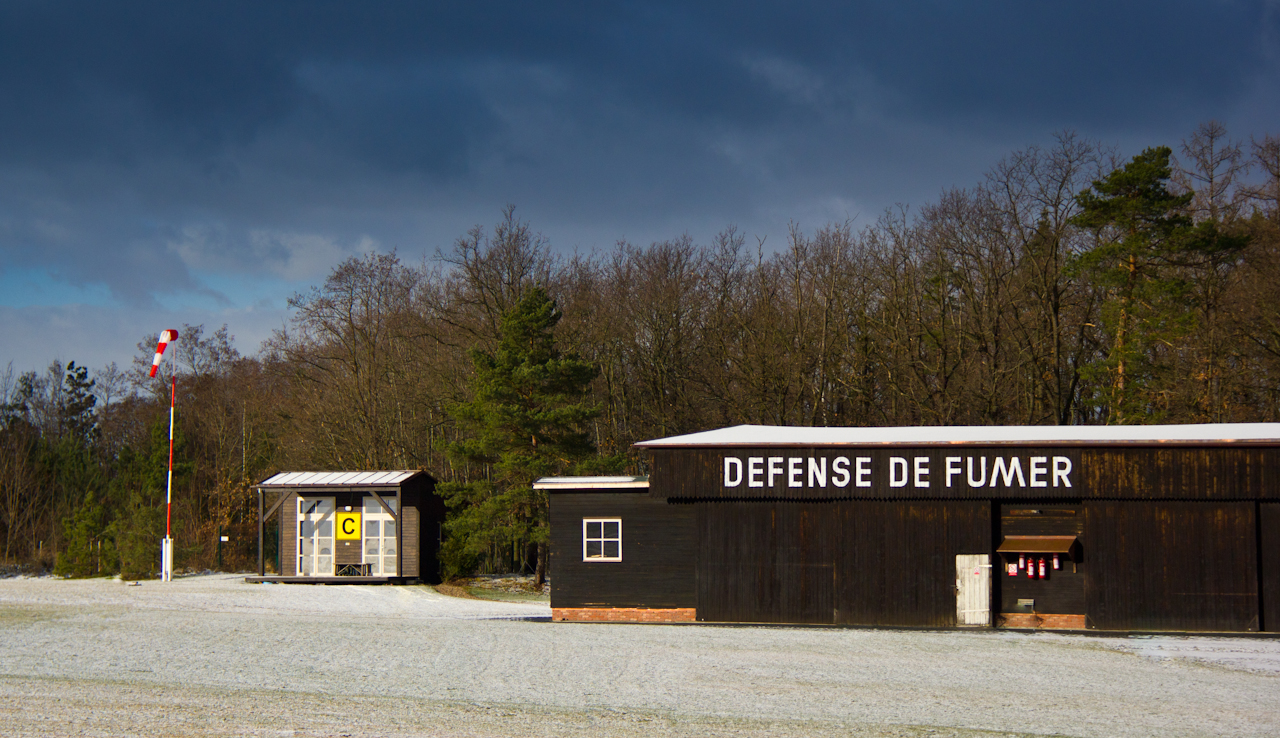
- IATA: none; ICAO: LKTC

Summary
- Airport type: Private
- Owner/Operator: Letecké Muzeum Točná s.r.o.
- Location: Točná, Czech Republic
- Elevation AMSL: 1,027 ft (313 m)
- Coordinates: 49°59′6″N 14°25′31″E
- Website: https://www.tocna.cz/

Map
- Location within Czech Republic

Runways
Direction	Length		Surface
Direction	ft	m	Surface
09/27	3,000	870	Grass

Točná Airport (49°59′N 14°25′E, ICAO airport code LKTC) is a private domestic airport in Točná, Prague 12 in the Czech Republic.

The airport opened as a recreational glider airport on March 31, 1946.

After 1989, the runway was shortened to 550 meters due to disputes with landowners.

In 2008, the airport was purchased by Ivo Lukačovič, founder of the Czech search engine and portal Seznam.cz The service buildings were rebuilt, the property secured by a fence, a museum and public playground were added, and the runway was lengthened to 870 meters.

== Museum ==
In addition to the aeroclub, Točná Airport is home to a museum of historical aircraft. However, the museum is opened to the public only on selected weekdays or by prior arrangement with the airport operator. All planes kept in the museum hangar are airworthy except both AN-2.

In 2026 the museum shows following planes:

Czechoslovakia/Czech production:

- Aero C-104S
- Avia BH-1 (slightly modified replica)
- Avia BH-5 (accurate replica using the original 1920s Walter engine)
- Praga E-114M
- Sokol M1C

Foreign production:

- Antonov AN-2 (outdoor static display)
- Beech Bonanza B35
- Boeing Stearman
- Hawker Hurricane Mk II
- Lockheed Model 10 Electra previously owned by Tomáš Baťa (1876–1932), founder of the Bata shoes company
- North American T-6 Texan
- Supermarine Spitfire IXe
- Waco YPF
