= Otakar Nickerl =

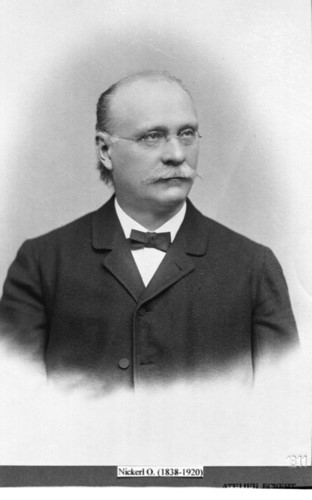

Otakar Nickerl (22 January 1838 – 3 September 1920) was a Czech medical doctor and entomologist who contributed to the entomology collections at the National Museum in Prague. Along with his father František Antonín Nickerl (1813–1871) and his son Otakar Nickerl Jr. (1873–1904), the three generations of Nickerls were involved in establishing the entomological collections at the National Museum. He was also a pianist and composer of some choral and solo piano pieces.

== Life ==
Nickerl was born in Prague, Bohemia, Austrian Empire, in the German speaking household of entomologist František Antonín Nickerl (1813–1871) and Emilie, born Sieglová (born 1815). He studied at the local schools and went to study medicine in Charles-Ferdinand University in Prague. He studied botany under Philipp Maximilian Opiz and worked as an assistant from 1864 at the University of Prague. In 1869 he became a professor of natural science at the Prague Polytechnic. In 1871 he married Christina, born Hennevogel von Ebenburg (1839–1911) and they had sons Francis (born 1872) and Otakar (born 1873, who also became an entomologist). He collected and exchanged insect specimens with others and added to the collection of his father. Travellers like Emil Holub contributed their collections to him. He cofounded the Society for physiocracy in Bohemia ("Gesellschaft für Physiokratie in Böhmen"). He was also involved in studies on insects of importance to forestry and agriculture. After his death, his collection and library was bequeathed to the National Museum in Prague.
