= František Antonín Nickerl =

Czech entomologist (1813–1871)

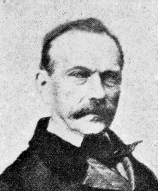
František Antonín Nickerl

František Antonín Nickerl (German: Franz Anton Nickerl; 4 December 1813 – 4 February 1871) was a Czech entomologist who specialised in Lepidoptera, especially those of Bohemia. His son Otakar Nickerl (1838–1920) and grandson Otakar Nickerl, Jr. (1873–1904) also became entomologists.

== Life ==
František Antonín Nickerl was born on 4 December 1813 in Prague. He graduated from philosophy in 1834, but was interested in natural science, especially insects. In 1841, Nickerl became a doctor of medicine. However, he became a university assistant in the department of zoology and mineralogy. In 1850, he became the curator of zoological collections at what is today the National Museum in Prague. Although he was a German-speaking Czech, he had a positive attitude towards the Czech language and suggested that museum exhibits be given Czech names next to the Latin names.

From 1851, he was a professor of natural sciences at the Prague Polytechnical Institute. In 1852, he became a full professor at the University of Graz, but he remained in Bohemia and became a full professor at the Prague Polytechnical Institute. He improved the mineralogical collection here and founded a zoological collection with his own donations. From 1852, he was the editor of the Czech natural science magazine Lotos. In 1857, he began experimenting with silkworm cultivation and founded the silkworm breeding industry in Bohemia.

During his life, Nickerl created a large Lepidoptera collection, the most important part of which was the Microlepidoptera collection, which was visited even by experts from abroad. In 1869, he fell ill and stopped working. Nickerl died on 4 February 1871 in Prague. His son Otakar (1838–1920) was also a physician, but he continued his father's work and also became a notable researcher of Czech entomology.

== Work ==
His most notable works include:

- Böhmens Tagfalter [Butteflies of Bohemia] (1837) – the first critical, scientifically conceived publication on Papilionoidea in Bohemia. Nickerl lists 117 species classified into 13 genera.
- Synopsis der Lepidopteren-Fauna Bohmens [Synopsis of the lepidopteran fauna of Bohemia] (1850) – the first part of the planned overview of Lepidoptera of Bohemia, focuses on Macrolepidoptera (excluding Geometroidea). It contains 583 described species (including 129 species of Papilionoidea, the list of which has been expanded since the last publication).

== Honours ==
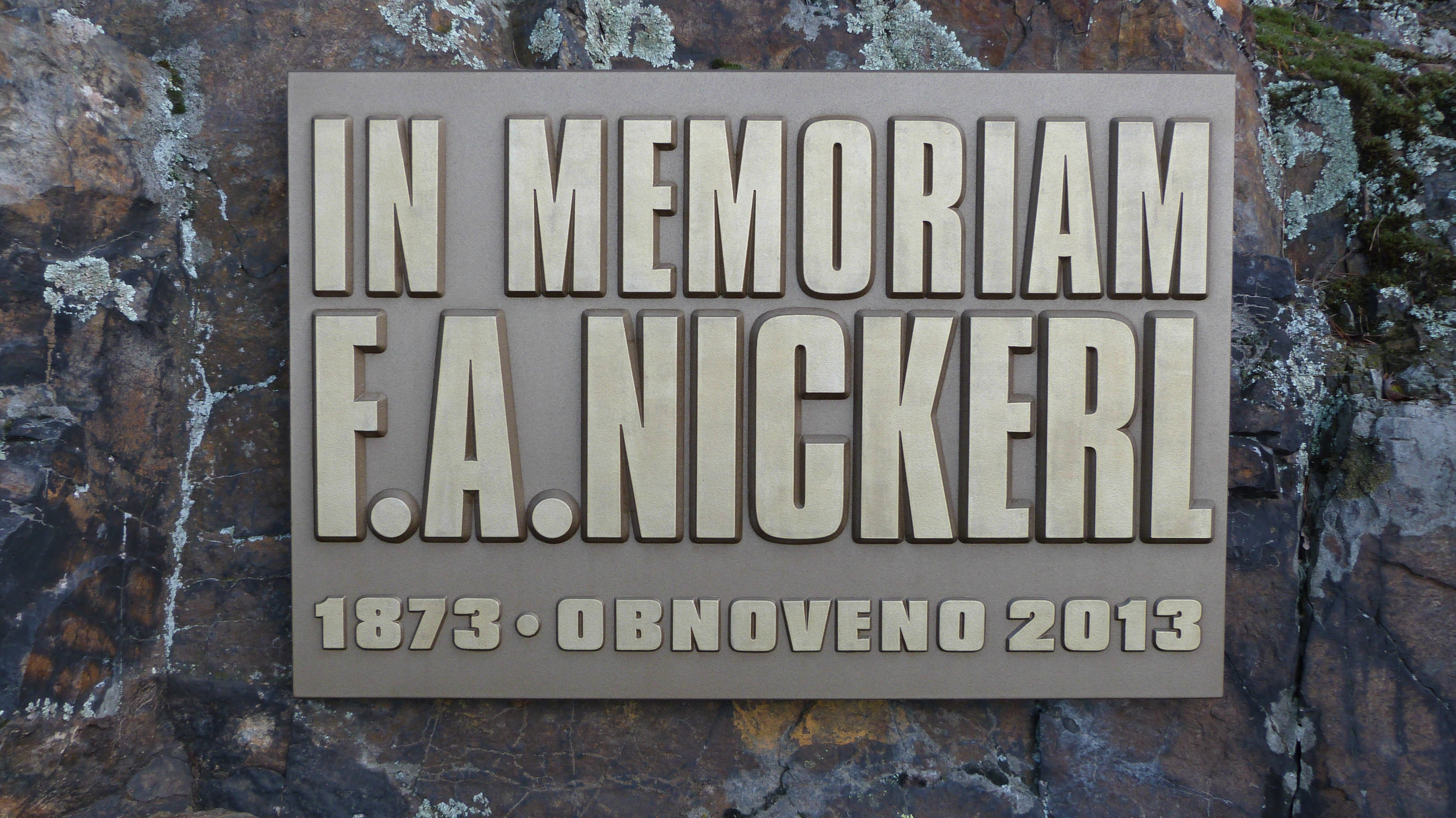
Memorial plaque in Břežany Valley

In Prague-Zbraslav in Břežany Valley, where Nickerl liked to go to collect and observe butterflies, is a memorial plaque.

Three species of Lepidoptera were named in honour of Nickerl, including luperina nickerlii (sandhill rustic), isidiella nickerlii, and mellicta aurelia (Nickerl's fritillary).
