= Modřany =

- Cadastral Area of Prague
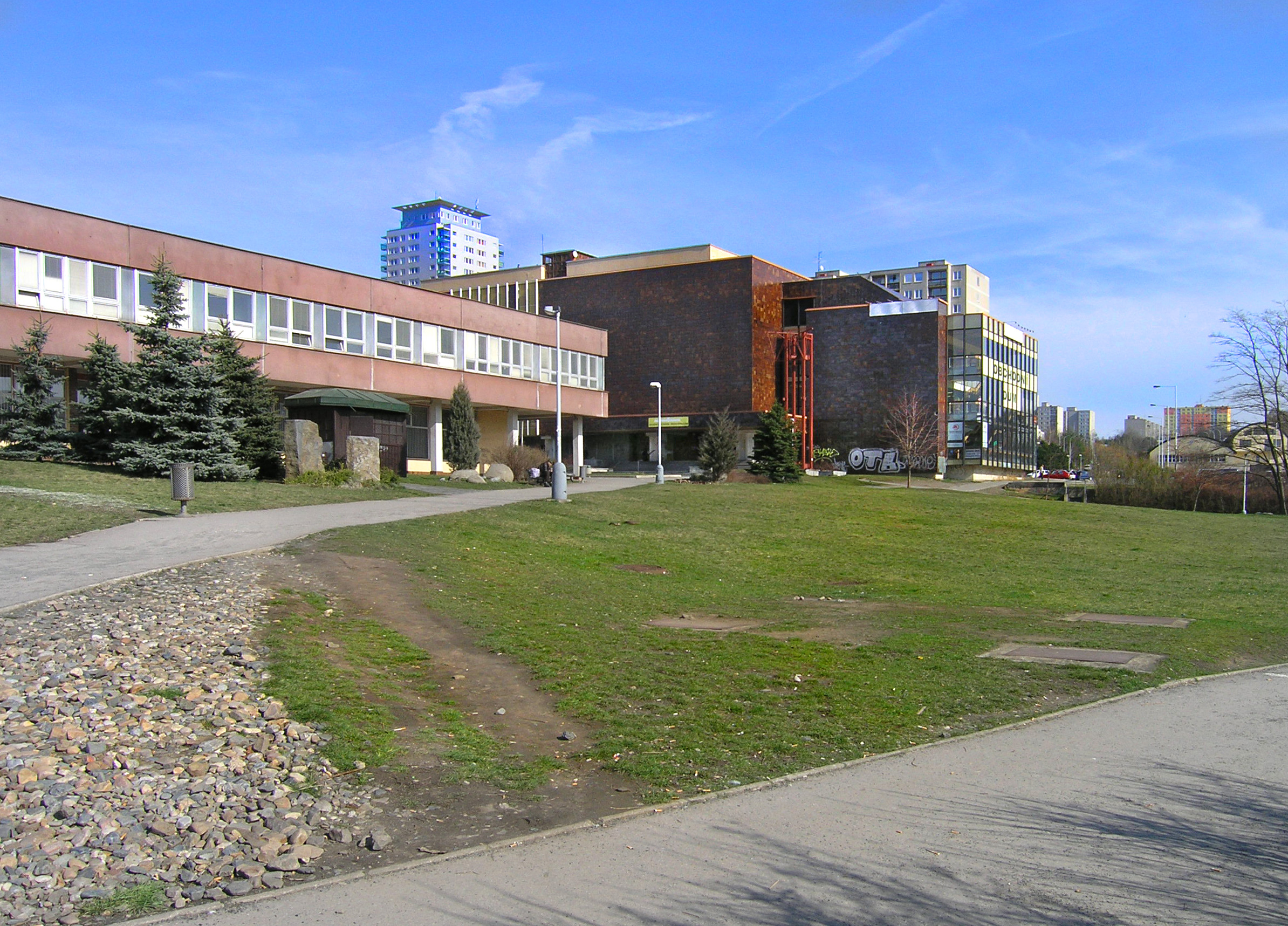
- Department store and service building on Sofijské náměstí (Sofia Square), high-rise residential building with cultural center "12" in the background

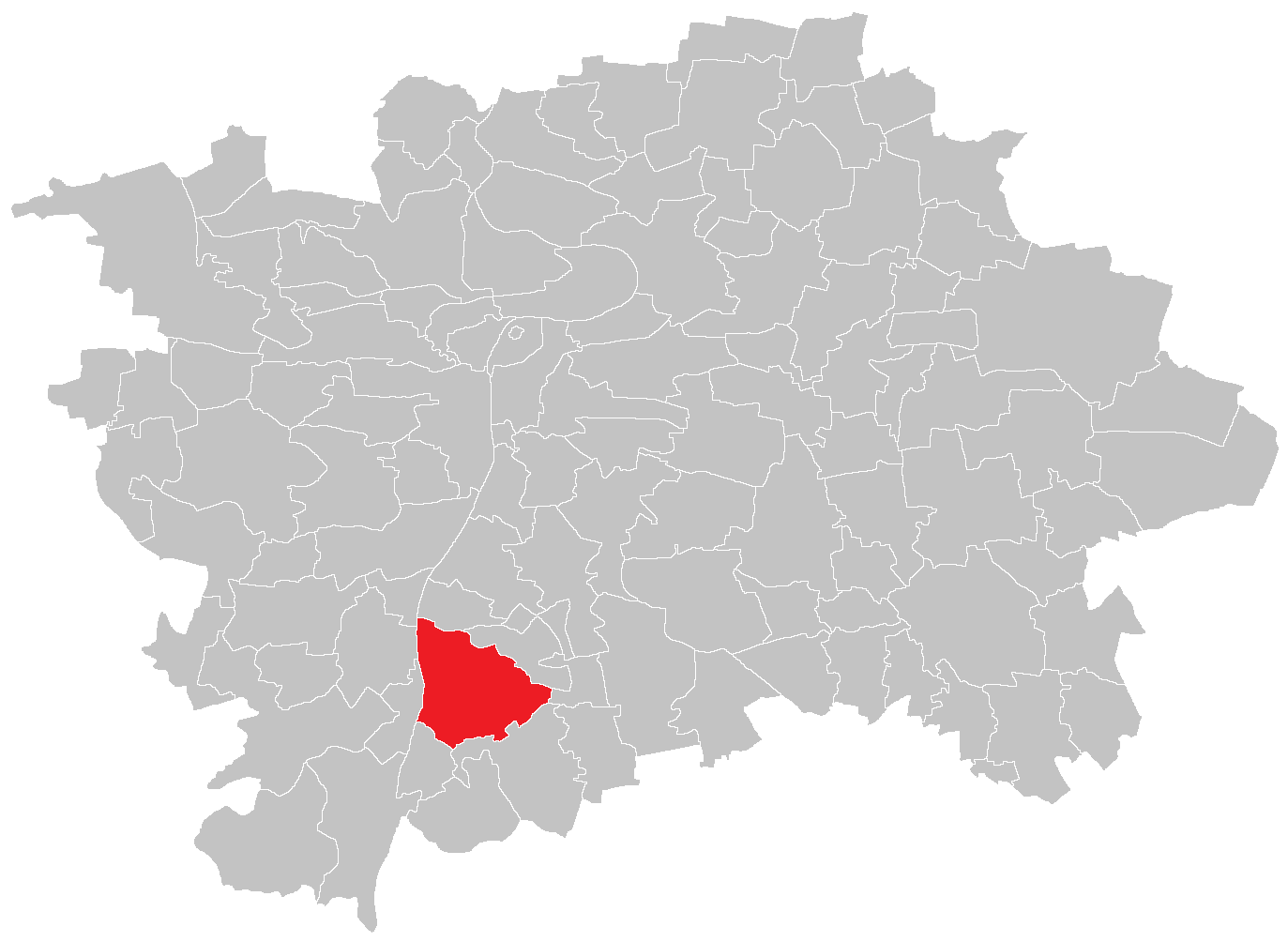
- Location of Modřany in Prague
- Coordinates: 50°00′11″N 14°25′11″E
- Country: Czech Republic
- Region: Prague
- District: Prague 12

Area
  - Total: 7.69 km^{2} (2.97 sq mi)

Population (2021)
  - Total: 33,574
  - Density: 4,370/km^{2} (11,300/sq mi)
- Time zone: UTC+1 (CET)
  - Summer (DST): UTC+2 (CEST)
- Postal code: 143 00

Modřany (Czech pronunciation: [ˈmodr̝anɪ]) is a cadastral district of Prague south of the city centre on the banks of the Vltava. It belongs to the municipal district Prague 12. Before being joined with the capital Prague in year 1974, Modřany was de facto a town.

The population of the district is 33,574, as of 2021.

== Demographics ==
Historical population

Year	Pop.	±%
1869	897	—
1880	1,314	+46.5%
1890	1,838	+39.9%
1900	2,516	+36.9%
1910	2,976	+18.3%

Year	Pop.	±%
1921	2,779	−6.6%
1930	6,205	+123.3%
1950	9,109	+46.8%
1961	10,004	+9.8%
1970	10,304	+3.0%

Year	Pop.	±%
1980	8,729	−15.3%
1991	32,561	+273.0%
2001	30,872	−5.2%
2011	30,703	−0.5%
2021	33,574	+9.4%

Source: Censuses
