= Prague 12 =

Prague 12 Praha 12
- Municipal District of Prague; Administrative District of Prague
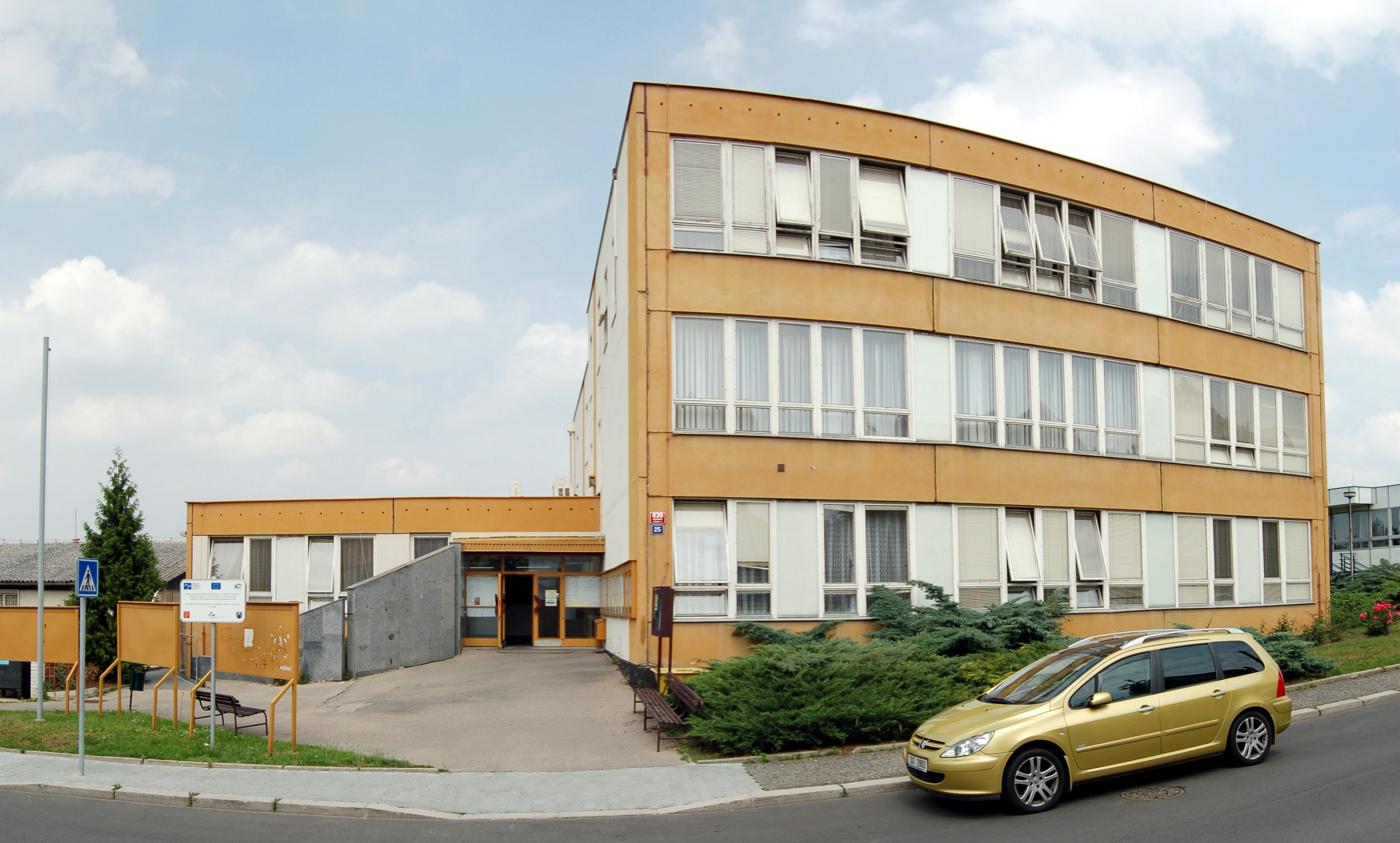
- Municipal building of the district

- Flag Coat of arms

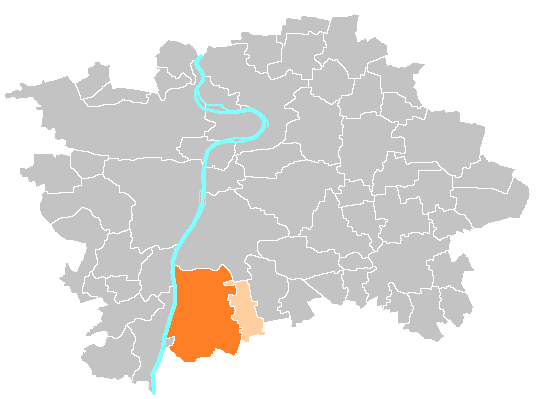
- Location of Prague 12 in Prague
- Coordinates: 50°0′36″N 14°24′25″E
- Country: Czech Republic
- Region: Prague

Government
  - Mayor: Vojtěch Kos

Area
  - Total: 23.31 km^{2} (9.00 sq mi)

Population (2021)
  - Total: 56,591
  - Density: 2,428/km^{2} (6,288/sq mi)
- Time zone: UTC+1 (CET)
  - Summer (DST): UTC+2 (CEST)
- Postal code: 143 00
- Website: http://www.praha12.cz

Prague 12 is a municipal district (městská část) in Prague, Czech Republic. It consists of the following cadastral subdivisions: Cholupice, Kamýk, Komořany, Modřany and Točná.

The administrative district (správní obvod) of the same name consists of municipal districts Prague 12 and Libuš.

== Demographics ==
Historical population
| Year | Pop. | ±% |
|---|---|---|
| 1869 | 1,446 | — |
| 1880 | 1,854 | +28.2% |
| 1890 | 2,452 | +32.3% |
| 1900 | 3,147 | +28.3% |
| 1910 | 3,569 | +13.4% |
| 1921 | 3,451 | −3.3% |
| 1930 | 7,113 | +106.1% |
| 1950 | 10,660 | +49.9% |
| 1961 | 11,973 | +12.3% |
| 1970 | 12,470 | +4.2% |
| 1980 | 22,051 | +76.8% |
| 1991 | 59,840 | +171.4% |
| 2001 | 54,856 | −8.3% |
| 2011 | 53,515 | −2.4% |
| 2021 | 56,591 | +5.7% |
Source: Censuses

== See also ==
- Districts of Prague#Symbols
