= Libuš =

Municipal district and cadastral area of Prague, Czech Republic

Coordinates: 50°0′33″N 14°27′44″E

- Municipal District and Cadastral Area of Prague
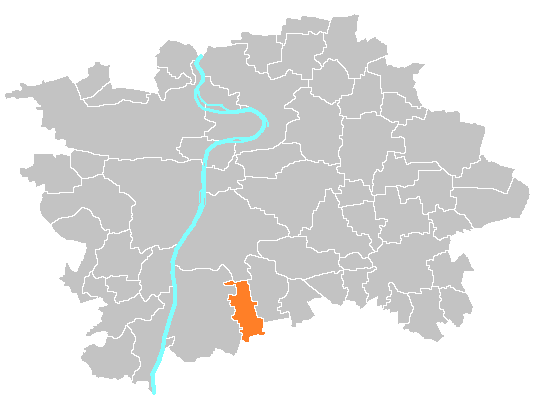
- Location of Libuš in Prague
- Country: Czech Republic
- Municipality: Prague

Area
  - Total: 5.24 km^{2} (2.02 sq mi)

Population
  - Total: 10,175
  - Density: 1,940/km^{2} (5,030/sq mi)

Libuš (Czech pronunciation: [ˈlɪbuʃ]) is one of the municipal districts of Prague. It is located in the southern part of Prague in the administrative district of Prague 4 and consists of the cadastral areas of Libuš and Písnice.

Both Libuš and Písnice were once independent villages near Prague. Libuš was attached to Prague in 1968 and Písnice in 1974; now they are both part of the Prague City in Prague-Libuš municipal district.

The history of Libuš goes back probably to the 13th century, but it is not documented. The first written information is from 1321, when Prague citizens gained power over the Libuš fort. Better information begins in the 17th century, when there was a pub on the road from Prague to the south.

Area: 5.24 km^{2}
Population: 9,702
