= Corps Austria =

German student corps

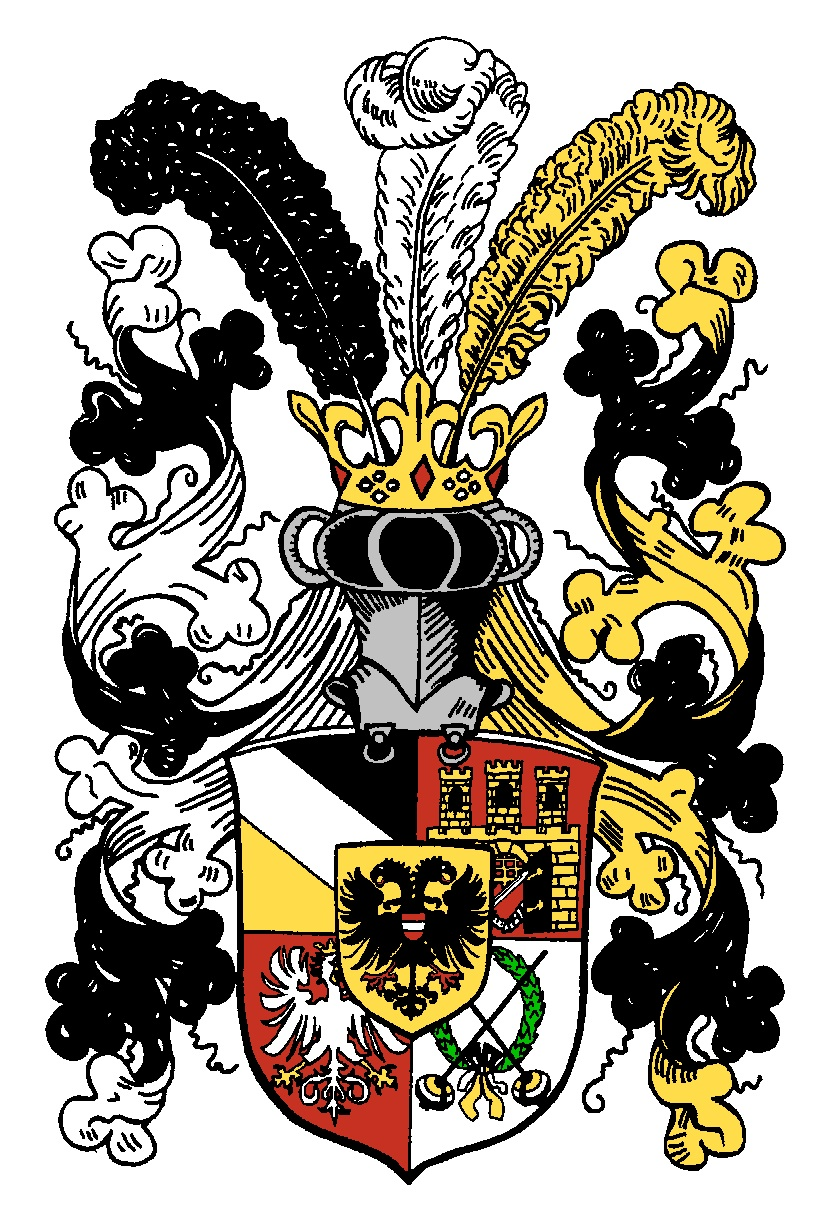
- Founded: 23 February 1861; 165 years ago Charles University
- Type: Studentenverbindung
- Affiliation: KSCV
- Status: Active
- Scope: Local
- Colors: Black, White and Yellow
- Chapters: 1
- Headquarters: Freiherr-vom-Stein-Straße 29; Frankfurt 60323; Germany
- Website: corpsaustria.de

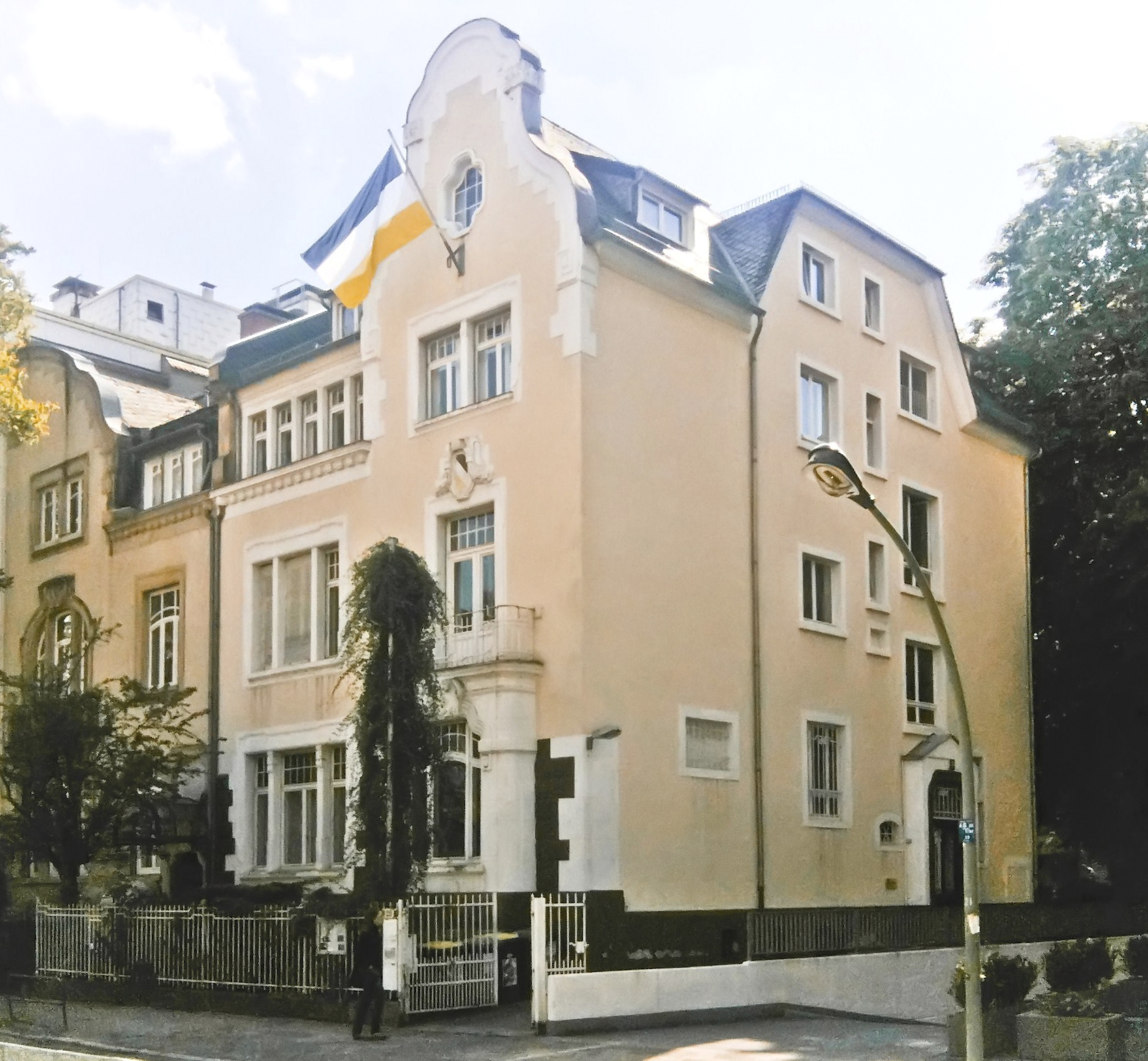
House of Austria in Frankfurt

Corps Austria is a member corps of the Kösener Senioren-Convents-Verband (KSCV), the association of the oldest student fraternities in Germany, Austria, and Switzerland.

Corps Austria is a pflichtschlagend fraternity, meaning that its members are required to participate in several organised duel-like fencing encounters with members of other specific student fraternities—a ritual dating back to the 17th century and famously described by Mark Twain in A Tramp Abroad. The corps is also farbentragend, as its members wear a coloured sash (from the right shoulder to the left waist) as a symbol of membership. Both practices are characteristic of traditional, and often elite, all-male fraternities in Central Europe.

Eligible applicants are students of Goethe University Frankfurt and other higher education institutions in Frankfurt, Germany. Members of Corps Austria are colloquially known as "Austrianer" or "Austern". The corps was founded in 1861 at the Charles-Ferdinand University in Prague and relocated to the newly established Goethe University Frankfurt in 1919.

Historically, German student corps were often recruited from the nobility and upper social classes, and are traditionally regarded as more elitist than other German student fraternities such as the Catholic Cartellverband and the Burschenschaften. They place emphasis on tolerance and individuality, with their values rooted in German idealism. While their general political orientation is conservative, they are generally viewed as more cosmopolitan and less right-wing than the Burschenschaften.

== History ==
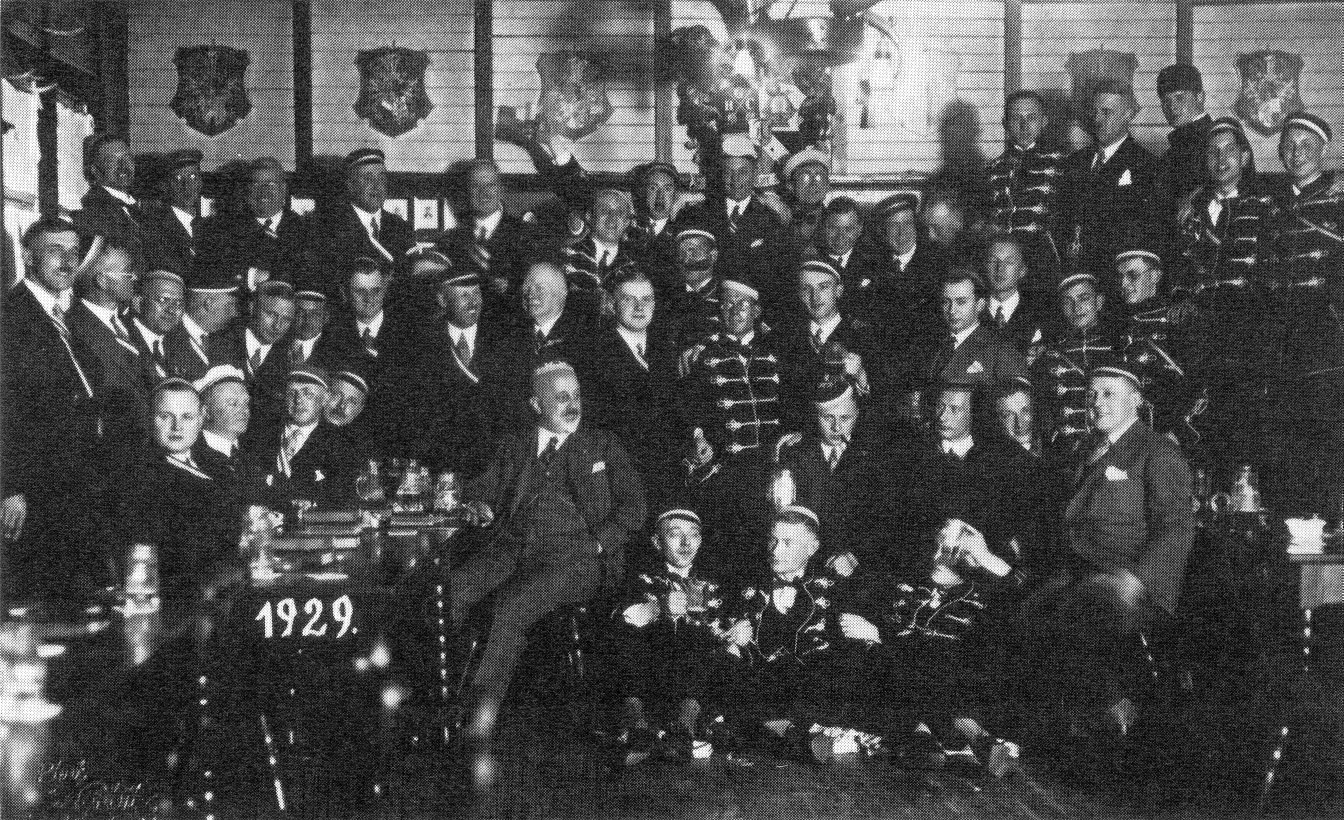
Founders' Day celebration, 1929, at the old fraternity house

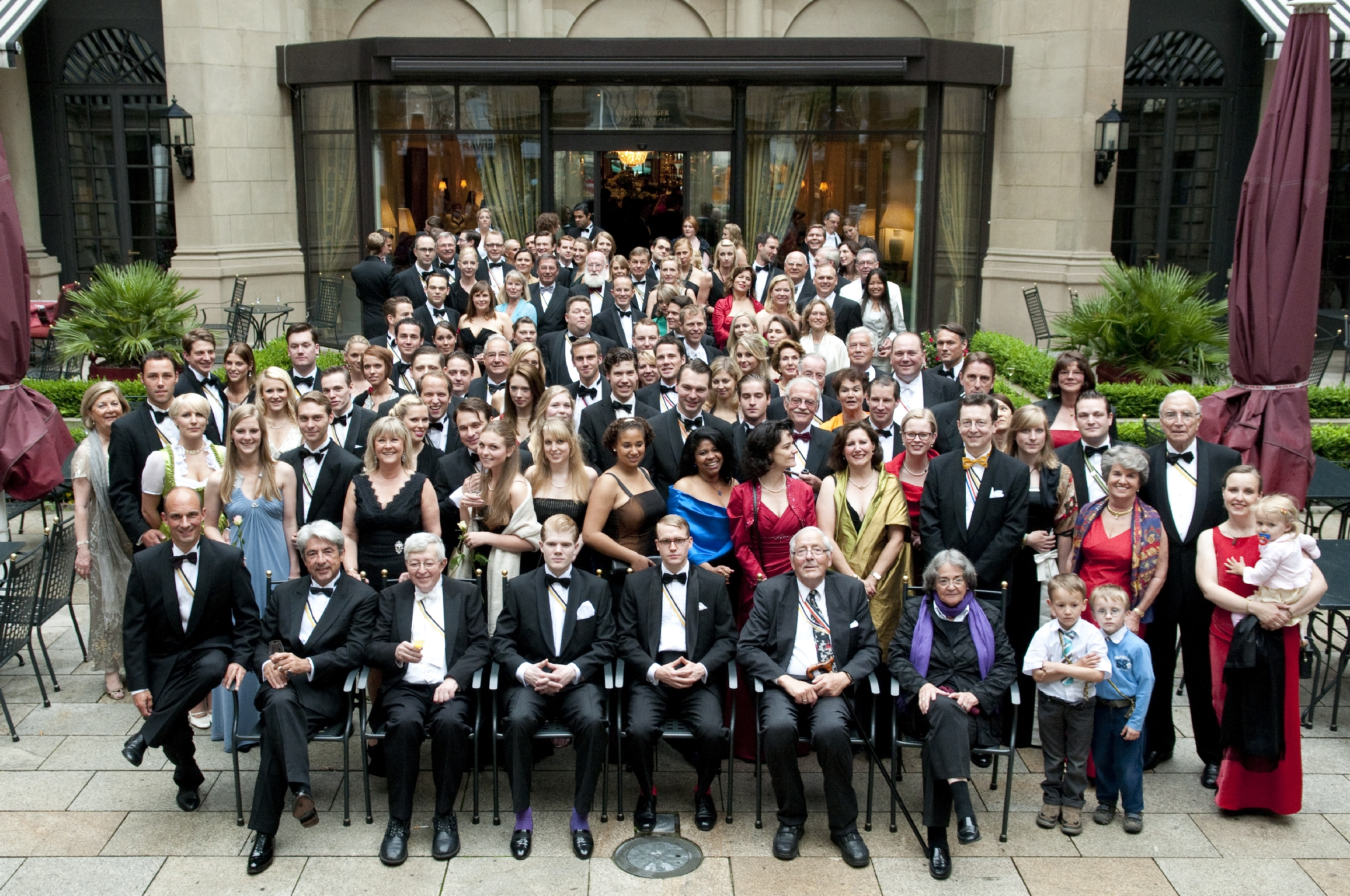
150th Founders' Day celebration ball, 2011

In 1793, the Reichstag of the Holy Roman Empire in Regensburg banned all student associations, fearing the spread of liberal and enlightenment ideals inspired by the French Revolution. The prohibition was most strictly enforced in the territories of the Habsburg Empire, largely due to the efforts of the conservative Metternich government. Even correspondence with foreign universities was forbidden for students.

After a brief period of relaxation following the Revolutions of 1848, student associations were again prohibited in 1849. It was not until 1859 that the political climate became more tolerant, allowing the re-establishment of student societies similar to those in other German-speaking states. This shift was partly the result of the Habsburg Empire's defeat at the Battle of Solferino and the resulting financial crisis. To implement necessary reforms, Emperor Franz Joseph I sought the support of the middle class, which was generally sympathetic to liberal ideas.

Questions of national identity among students were more pronounced within the multiethnic Austrian Empire than in other German-speaking regions. Czech students, for example, viewed the German-style student associations established in Prague as distinctly "German," while Austrian students increasingly regarded their fraternities as expressions of national identity. Consequently, such associations—known for their colourful insignia and nationalist symbolism—sometimes provoked hostility from local populations.

=== Origins of Corps Austria ===
Corps Austria was founded on 23 February 1861 by students of the Karl-Ferdinand University (now Charles University) in Prague. On 28 June 1881, during the annual Stiftungsfest (Founders' Day) celebration in Kuchelbad, a popular resort near Prague, an incident later referred to as the Battle of Kuchelbad occurred when Czech students violently disrupted the festivities and dispersed the participants.

This event set a precedent for increasing tension between the Empire's national groups. The Badeni Language Act of 5 April 1897 sought to bridge divisions between Czech and German-speaking populations by granting equal status to German and Czech in courts and public administration in Bohemia and Moravia. However, widespread protests by German speakers led to the law's repeal by 1899. These escalating national conflicts contributed to the instability that ultimately led to the First World War and the collapse of the Empire.

After the war, the Corps decided not to reconstitute itself in Prague, partly because its colours were associated with the former Habsburg Monarchy. In 1919, Corps Austria relocated—first to Innsbruck, where it was hosted by Corps Rhaetia Innsbruck, and later that same year to the newly established Goethe University Frankfurt, where it remains active.

In 1935, the National Socialist government required all student organisations to expel members deemed "non-Aryan." Corps Austria refused to comply and was consequently forced to close in 1936. In 1939, its alumni association (Alte Herren Verein) was disbanded by the Gestapo for refusing to cooperate with the National Socialist German Students' League (NSDStB). Following World War II, during which nineteen members were killed, Corps Austria was re-established in Frankfurt in 1949.

=== Affiliation ===
Corps Austria has been a member of the Kösener Senioren-Convents-Verband (KSCV) since 1919. Based on its traditions and values—such as personal etiquette, honour, and decorum—it is considered part of the "Blue Circle" (Blauer Kreis), an informal grouping within the KSCV of corps sharing similar principles and forming close alliances.

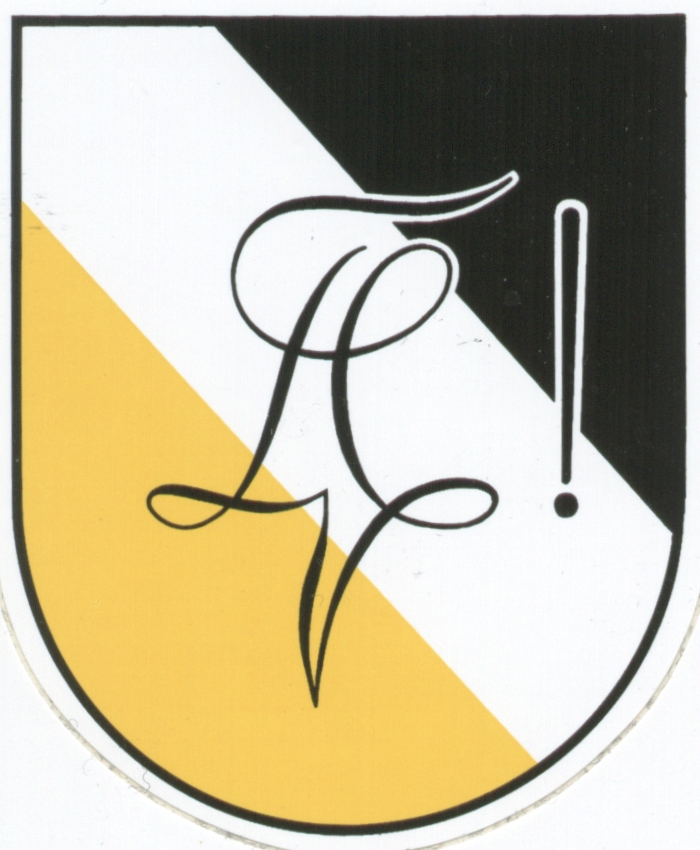
Farbschild of Corps Austria

== Symbols ==
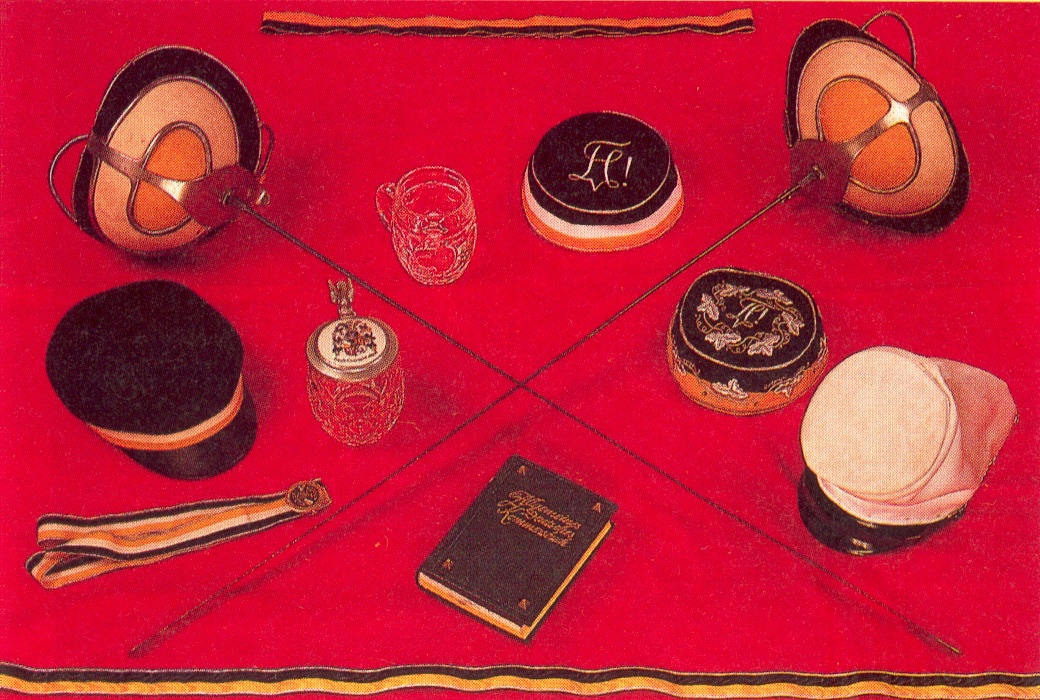
Couleur of Corps Austria

The couleur (or "colours") of Corps Austria are black, white, and yellow, in that order. Black and yellow were the colours of the flag of the Habsburg Monarchy until 1867. In addition to the coloured sash, members also wear headgear, which forms an obligatory part of the "couleur" or uniform of the Corps.

Depending on the season, one of two types of headgear is worn by active members (Aktive). During the winter academic semester, members wear a black cap featuring thin bands of black, white, and yellow. In the summer semester, a white silk Stürmer or kepi with black, white, and yellow piping may be worn. According to the Corps constitution, the Stürmer may only be used if approved by the internal council (Corps Convent) for that semester.

On certain formal occasions, members may also wear a Kneipjacke (mess jacket), which is black with silver and black braiding. Initiate members, known as Füchse, wear a two-coloured sash of black and yellow, in contrast to the three-coloured sash of full members (Corpsbrüder, or CBs).

Like other student fraternities, Corps Austria has its own motto: Durch Eintracht Stark! ("Strength Through Unity!").

== Notable members ==
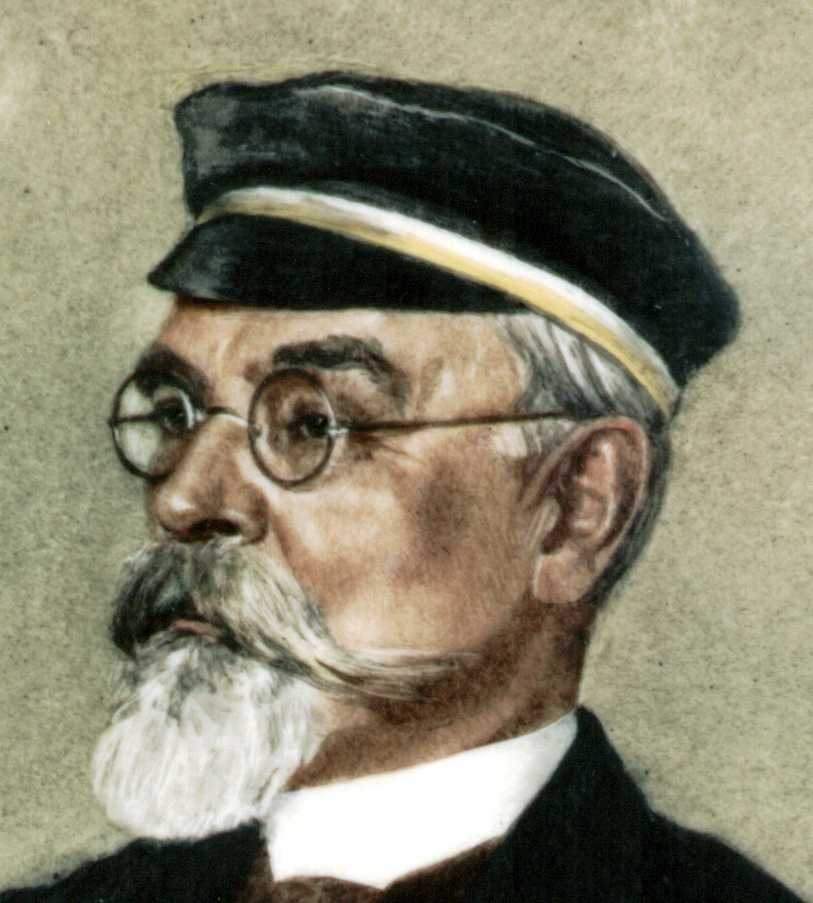
Josef Neuwirth, c. 1925

- Vincenz Czerny (1842–1916), surgeon
- Robert Gersuny (1844–1924), surgeon
- Jürgen Herrlein (born 1962), lawyer
- Ott-Heinrich Keller (1906–1990), mathematician
- Josef Neuwirth (1855–1934), art historian
- Alfred Pribram (1841–1912), internist
- Richard Pribram (1847–1928), chemist
- August Leopold von Reuss (1841–1924), ophthalmologist
- Karl Hans Strobl (1877–1946), novelist
- Eberhard Zahn (1910–2010), physician
- Anton Tausche (1838–1898), educator and politician
