= Fire of the National Theatre in Prague =

1881 fire of newly-opened Prague theatre venue

Coordinates: 50°4′52″N 14°24′49″E

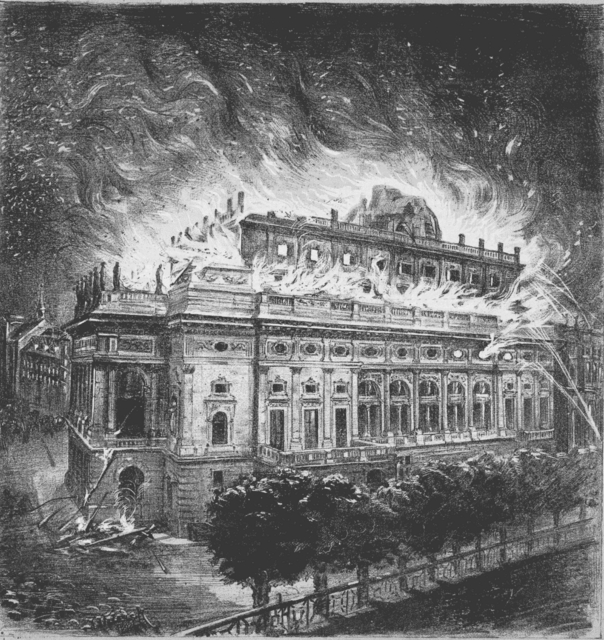
- Illustration of the event in Czech Humoristické listy magazine (27 August 1881)
- Date: 12 August 1881; 145 years ago
- Time: Around 5:00 pm
- Location: Prague, Austria-Hungary (present-day Czech Republic)
- Cause: Inflamation of the roof asphalt coverage
- Outcome: Flamable parts of the building destroyed
- Deaths: none
- Injuries: none

The fire at the National Theatre in Prague broke out on 12 August 1881, two months after its grand opening, while finishing work was still underway. The blaze destroyed the copper dome, the auditorium, the stage curtain created by František Ženíšek, and the stage itself. According to the official findings of the investigation at the time, the fire was caused by the carelessness of tinsmiths performing finishing work on the building; however, later attempts to reconstruct the events have cast doubt on this version. However, the event remains one of the most significant and publicly known fire disasters in the history of Prague and the entire history of the Czech lands.

== Prelude ==
The idea of creating a national theatre institution became an intense initiative of Czech patriot groups against Austrian-German cultural influence in the Czech lands, integrated into Austria-Hungary. After thirteen years of construction, funded partially from a public funding collections, the National Theatre first opened on 11 June 1881. The event marked the visit of Crown prince Rudolf of Austria, with a premiere of Bedřich Smetana's Libuše, an opera composed specifically for the occasion in the early 1870s. A total of twelve performances took place before the building was closed for finishing work, including some roof parts.

== Accident ==
=== Fire outbreak ===
The fire occurred in the midst of this work, on the hot Friday afternoon of 12 August 1881. According to the official account, the fire started because tinsmiths named Jenisch and Ziniburg, who were installing a lightning rod on the roof, allegedly failed to properly extinguish the charcoal in the small stoves used to heat the soldering irons for joining the roof's metal sheets. The investigation concluded that around 4:30 PM, the workers dumped the coals into the gutter and doused them with water; however, the heat from the coals caused the copper gutter to become red-hot, igniting the wooden roof sheathing. Around 5:00 PM, it began to rain, meaning water would have been flowing through the gutter where the hot coals supposedly remained.

=== Discovery and rescue efforts ===
A firefighter on patrol spotted the fire around 5:30 PM and promptly activated the building's telegraph alarm. Coincidentally, at that very moment, a watchman from nearby Poštovská Street also reported the fire. Consequently, the fire dispatch center received only a continuous dash signal instead of the Morse code for "ND" (stands for Národní divadlo – National Theatre) failing to identify the fire's location. A follow-up report signal arrived only after about half an hour later.

Sculptor Bohuslav Schnirch, one of the decoration authors, was among the first to fight the fire on the roof. Because the sprinkler system above the stage had activated and all the building's hydrants had been opened simultaneously, water pressure dropped, and the flow ceased after a few minutes. The theatre was supplied by the Karlov waterworks, where a supply pipe had burst the previous day, causing the reservoir's water level to drop significantly. Strong winds at this time fueled the spread of the fire. Residual gas in the piping also ignited. Ultimately, the iron curtain could only be lowered partially, and only after the fire had already reached the auditorium. Shortly thereafter, the ceiling and chandelier collapsed.

Initially, 12 firefighters arrived with a single fire pump and a water tender; reinforcements followed, though they lacked extension ladders and similar equipment. The fire brigade succeeded in protecting surrounding buildings from the fire, including the adjacent Provisional Theatre. The fire completely destroyed the theatre's roof, auditorium, and stage, including the sets for the upcoming premiere Libuše inscenation. The vestibule, foyer, loggia, and a number of rooms – such as the archive, the cloakroom, and the theatre office - remained intact. Firefighters also managed to save many works of art.

=== Circumstances ===
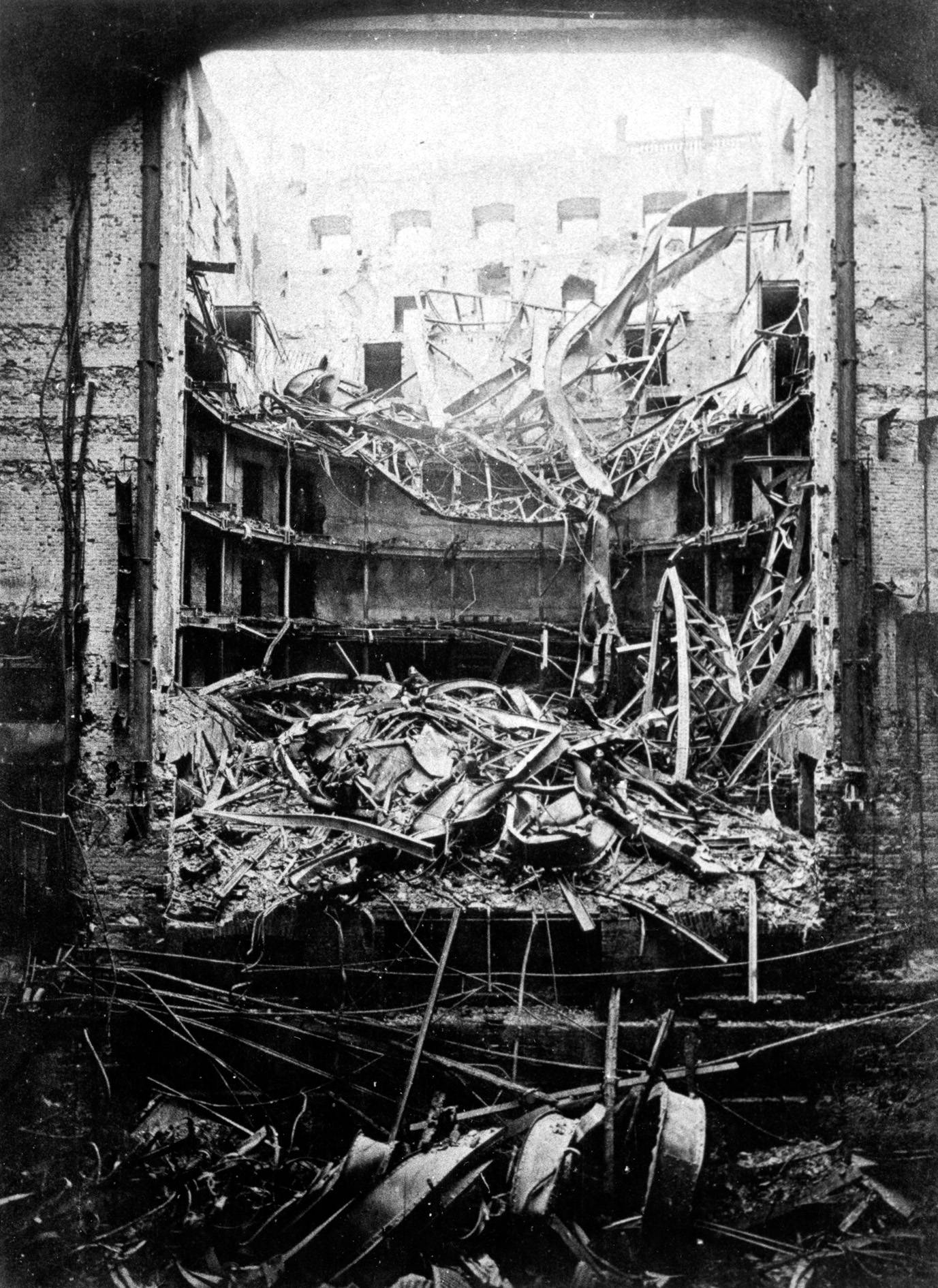
Interior after the disaster

From the outset, amidst a charged atmosphere of finger-pointing, speculation arose that the theatre had burned down due to ethnic tensions between Prague's Czech and German populations. However, the investigation focused on two tinsmiths and concluded that their negligence had caused the fire. A report by the Committee for the Establishment of the National Theatre cited additional factors contributing to the fire's spread, including malfunctioning hydrants, disorganised operations, and inadequate firefighting equipment. In the wake of the incident, Josef Lammer, the commander of the Prague municipal fire brigade, retired after 24 years of service.

A century later, non-fiction writer and historian Miroslav Ivanov commissioned an expert analysis at the Czechoslovak Aeronautical Research and Test Institute; the study demonstrated that the building could not have caught fire from unextinguished embers. In his historical investigation published in 1983, Miroslav Ivanov encountered a number of circumstances:

- the mysterious suicide of senior firefighter Čeněk Diviš,
- a noticeable drop in pressure in the Prague water mains on the very day of the fire – 12 August 1881,
- the bursting of a pipe in the Nové Mlýny waterworks,
- the inability to operate the iron safety curtain because scaffolding for stucco workers was standing beneath it that day,
- the fact that the two workers on the roof, to whom the outbreak of the fire is attributed, were employed by a German company,

the nationalist conflicts between Czechs and Germans taking place at the time; these tensions culminated on 28 June 1881 (17 days after the National Theatre opened and a month and a half before the fire) in a so-called Chuchle battle in Chuchle near Prague, that required gendarmerie intervention and was linked to the struggle over the division of Prague's Charles-Ferdinand University, which was carried out the following year.

Among Ivanov's findings there were however even more coincidences" that contributed to the outbreak and spread of the fire:

- firefighters themselves had allegedly left a soldering stove on the theatre roof that afternoon,
- two reports of the incident telegraphed to the fire station cancelled each other out,
- passersby rushed into the building to extinguish the flames but only caused more damage,
- earlier that day, firefighters had been testing a new steam-powered fire engine from a British company; they had not yet * formally accepted delivery and could not locate it, nor did they have enough coal, and the hoses could not reach the lowered water level of the Vltava River,
- Prague firefighters were attending the funeral of a colleague who had committed suicide due to unrequited love for a theatre dancer,
- firefighters from outside Prague were the first to arrive at the scene;
- the responding firefighters could not secure horses—people refused to lend them any;
- the iron curtain could not be lowered due to ongoing decorative work;
- asphalt had been used as a construction material for the National Theatre's upper loggia;
- the architect responsible for the National Theatre's water system, in a hasty attempt to extinguish the flames, drained all the water stored above the stage; and low water pressure at the Karlov waterworks, caused by a malfunction, hampered efforts.

An expert analysis conducted in the late 20th century reportedly increased the likelihood of the theory that the fire was deliberately set; however, this theory cannot be conclusively proven due to a lack of direct evidence or the identification of anyone who might have been involved in starting the fire. Nevertheless, the analysis reportedly succeeded in refuting the accusations leveled by the court at the time against the two tinsmiths, Jenisch and Ziniburg.

=== Aftermath ===
The burnt-out auditorium, August 1881, photo by František Fridrich

Following the fire in 1881, restoration work could begin immediately thanks to an insurance payout of 297,869 guldens from the First Czech Mutual Insurance Company. The fire was perceived as a "national catastrophe" and sparked immense determination to launch new fundraising drives; one million guldens was raised in just 47 days. In total, 45% of Prague's population contributed to the collection.

The capital city of Prague was among the most significant donors, contributing 181,623.99 guldens toward the theatre's reconstruction; other major municipal donors included cities Plzeň, Smíchov, and Karlín, each contributing approximately 15,000 to 20,000 guldens. The bulk of the reconstruction funds was provided by the state, including the Diet of the Kingdom of Bohemia. The Committee for the Establishment of the Czech National Theatre in Prague also secured a loan from the Municipal Savings Bank. Significant sums were contributed by Emperor Franz Joseph I and members of the imperial family (the Habsburg-Lorraine family donated 31,000 guldens in total), the Russian Tsar Alexander III, the Czech nobility (e.g., the Lobkowicz, Schwarzenberg, Kaunitz, Chotek, and Kolowrat families collectively contributed over 30,000 guldens), and Czech women patriots who donated proceeds from charity bazaars- Among corporate donors, the most significant contributor was the Pilsen Municipal Brewery, which donated 5,000 guldens. Fundraising drives—collecting guldens and kreuzers—were also held among the general public. Lawyer and politician Václav Seidl is often credited with the idea of these public collections, while lawyer and politician Josef Říha is cited as one of the organizers.

Due to disagreements with the Committee, the project's architect, Josef Zítek, refused to continue with the reconstruction and never set foot in the National Theatre building again. Following the fire, the building was completed by architect Josef Schulz. The restored theatre reopened on 18 November 1883, once again with a performance of Smetana's Libuše.

== See also ==
- List of building or structure fires
