= Paul Zucker =

American architect

Paul Zucker (August 14, 1888 in Berlin – February 14, 1971 in New York City) was a German-born architect, art historian, art critic and author. Between 1919 and 1935, he practiced architecture in Berlin.

== Education ==
Paul Zucker studied architecture and art history in Berlin and Munich; he graduated with the degree of Diplom-Ingenieur (Dipl.-Ing.) from the Technische Hochschule (Berlin-)Charlottenburg. The same institution awarded him a doctorate in engineering in 1913. He wrote his thesis ("Spatial Representations and Pictorial Architectures in the Florentine Painters of the First Half of the Quattrocento") under Richard Borrmann's supervision.

== Career ==
From 1918 to 1937, he worked as a freelance architect in Berlin, designing numerous country houses, store interiors, and major buildings. Only one of them survives today.

In 1916, he began teaching as a lecturer in art history, architecture and urban planning at the Lessing-Hochschule in Berlin; from 1928 he lectured at the Staatliche Hochschule für Bildende Kunst (later called the Bauhaus). In 1933, he was dismissed from the Bauhaus for being a Jew. The Lessing-Hochschule followed suit in 1935, and in 1937 Zucker was banned from teaching anywhere in the Third Reich.

=== New York ===
He emigrated to the United States in 1937, became a U.S. citizen in 1944, and worked in New York as a lecturer in architectural and art history at the New School for Social Research and at the Cooper Union Art School. After moving to New York, he no longer worked as a commercial architect, but in 1943, Zucker and others created the "German Village," a realistic replica of Berlin tenements, at the Dugway Proving Ground test site in Utah. Here, various explosive and incendiary bombs were tested for their effect on these dwellings.

Zucker's writings ranged from the history of scenic design to modern urban planning. He often returned to the topic of ruins, decay, and relics.

== Awards ==
- 1953: Arnold W. Brunner Scholarship Award from The American Institute of Architects (AIA)
- 1968: Order of Merit of the Federal Republic of Germany (First Class)
- 1969: Rossi-Prize from Cooper Union Art School in New York
