= Television Center Kavčí hory =

Headquarters of Czech Television

- Televizní středisko Kavčí hory
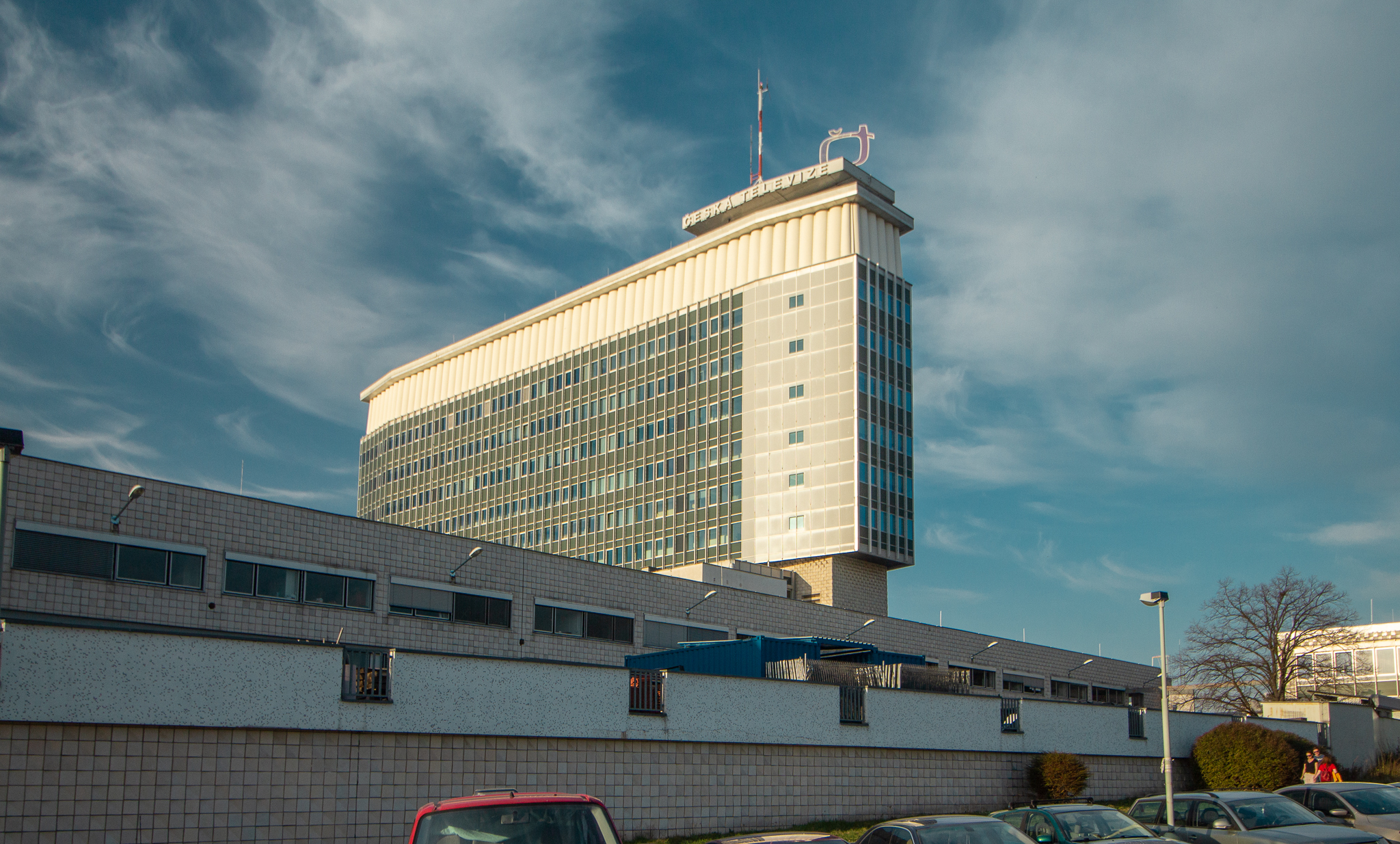
- Interactive map of the Television Center Kavčí hory area

General information
- Status: Operational
- Type: Broadcasting center
- Location: Prague 4, Prague, Czech Republic
- Coordinates: 50.0502°N 14.4260°E
- Current tenants: Czech Television
- Named for: Kavčí hory (locality)
- Construction started: 1 July 1962
- Completed: 1979 (Main complex)
- Opened: October 1970 (First phase)
- Owner: Czech Television
- Operator: Czech Television

Technical details
- Floor area: 2,000 m² (initial studio space)

Design and construction
- Architect: František Šmolík
- Main contractor: Konstruktiva

Website
- www.ceskatelevize.cz

Television Center Kavčí hory is the central site of Czech Television (formerly Czechoslovak Television) in Prague. It is located in the locality of Kavčí hory in Prague 4, at the junction of Podolí and Nusle.

== History ==
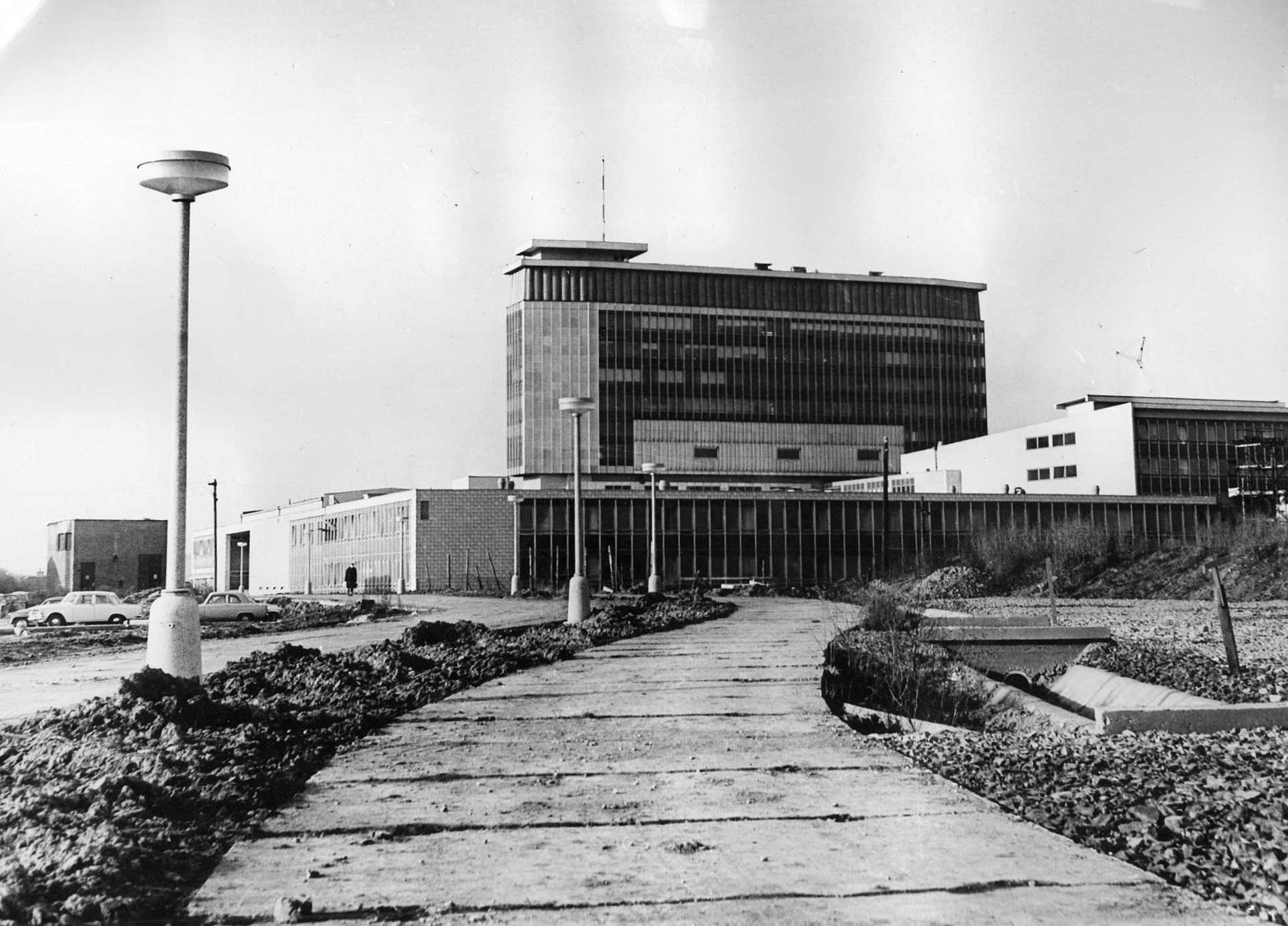
Center in 1971

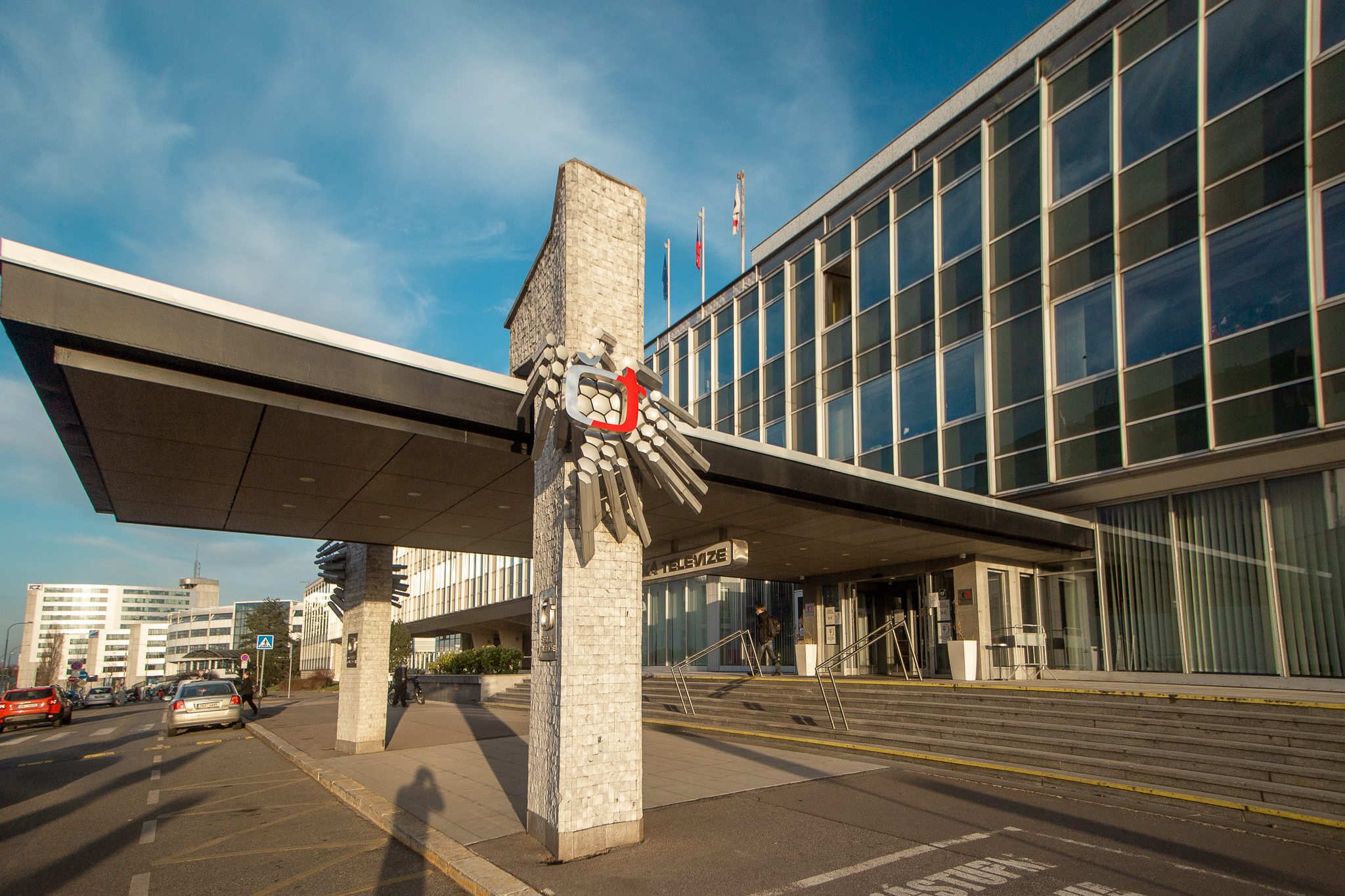
Main entrance

At the end of 1958, the Czechoslovak Television (ČST) submitted to the Prague Planning Commission a proposal for the construction of a television complex in Kavčí hory, the investment task of building this area was approved by the Czechoslovak government in February 1960. The idea of building a new television workplace was born from need for a technological separation of television and film production from broadcasting itself and need for specifically equipped technological environment.

In March 1962, the project of the group of architect František Šmolík from the Office of the Chief Architect of Prague was chosen. The construction of the area in Kavčí Hory began on 1 July 1962. The general contractor was Konstruktiva company. However the construction work was stopped in January 1963 by decision of state authorities because other buildings were prioritized. During the summer of 1963, the plenum of the Central Committee of the Communist Party of Czechoslovakia decided that the construction of the area on the Kavčí Hory should continue in 1965,

In October 1970, the first part of Prague's Television Center Kavčí hory with two studios started running. In 1971, the federal government included the completion of the complex on the Kavčí hory among the mandatory investment tasks, while 2,000 m^{2} of studio space was to be handed over by the end of 1975. In May 1973, a color check-in complex was put into operation on Kavčí hory, and regular color broadcasts on II. program. In 1975, the construction of the Television Newspaper Building was started and during 1976 the second block with three studios and other spaces was completed. Construction of the computer center began in 1977. A separate Television Newspaper Building with three news complexes was put into operation during the first half of 1979, and in the following year a music studio was opened in Kavčí hory. This completed the main area of the TV complex on the Kavčí Hory.

Current general manager of Czech Television is Jan Souček, who was elected for a six-year term by the Czech Television Council (Czech: Rada České televize). Souček has courted controversy in his tenure given his attack on free media and his attacks on employees of Czech Television. Souček compared himself to Milada Horáková after strong criticism of his managerial skills from Czech Television Council. Souček later commented that it was silly from him. In an interview on 5. 9. 2023‌ Souček, as the incoming director general, stated: "I am constantly asking for money. A press conference of the Ministry of Culture has been announced for Tuesday, where the ministerial commission should reveal how it envisions the reform of financing public service media. According to my information, our call will be heard for the most part." During his tenure, Souček constantly asks for more money from the public fees, however it seems that he is not able to use money economically while blacking out financial documents to hide it from the public.
