= Disappearance of Jan Nejedlý =

Czech schoolboy who went missing in 1998

Jan Nejedlý
- Born: 22 November 1988
- Disappeared: 17 January 1998 (aged 9); Prague-Podolí, Czech Republic
- Status: Missing for 28 years, 8 months and 20 days
- Occupation: Student

Jan Nejedlý (born 22 November 1988, disappeared 17 January 1998) was a Czech boy who disappeared while walking to a friend's house on 17 January 1998 in the Prague district of Podolí. He has been described in the media as one of the most well-known missing children in the Czech Republic.

== Disappearance ==
On the day of his disappearance, Nejedlý walked from his home to a friend's house on the same street to play video games. His four-year-old sister also asked to go with him but was not allowed. Nejedlý was met on the way by his family doctor, who greeted him. His friend turned out to not be home, and Nejedlý failed to return.

== Aftermath ==
The police initially questioned Nejedlý's parents, causing a delay in their response. An extensive nationwide search was subsequently launched, but this was not successful. Interpol was also involved in search efforts.

In 1998, a person claiming to be a gay prostitute from Linz, Austria contacted Nejedlý's parents and told them that Nejedlý was being forced to work at a gay club. He arranged for the parents to meet at midnight on Wenceslas Square with someone he claimed would sell Nejedlý back to them. Nejedlý's father asked the police to accompany them, though the police presence ended up being large with several cars and officers, and no one showed up to meet the parents. Nejedlý's father later stated he believed the police botched the situation.

Nejedlý is currently considered endangered missing by The Doe Network. His father died of cancer in 2014.
