= Braník Bridge =

Bridge in Prague, Czech Republic

Coordinates: 50°01′37″N 14°23′51″E

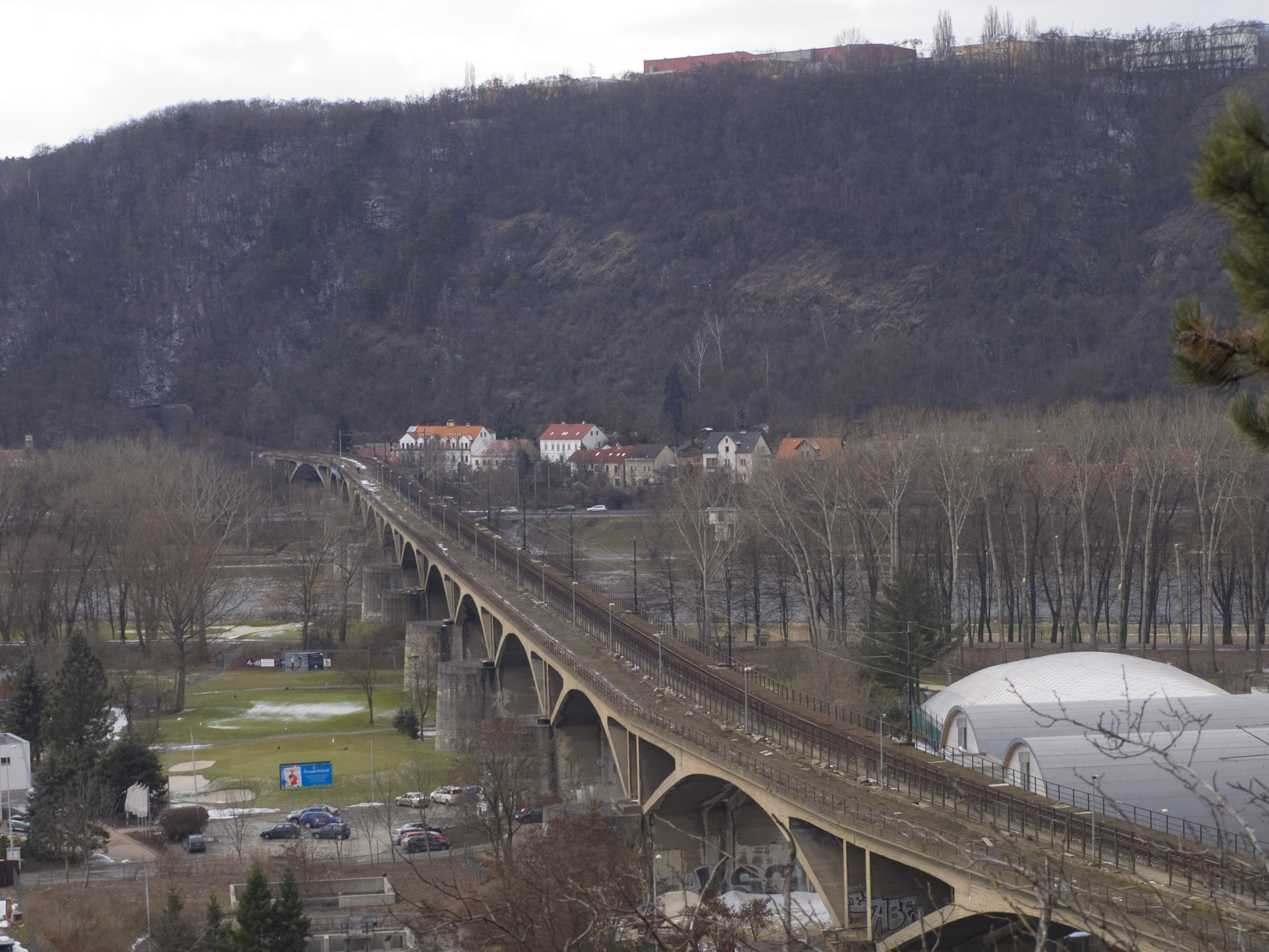
Branický most

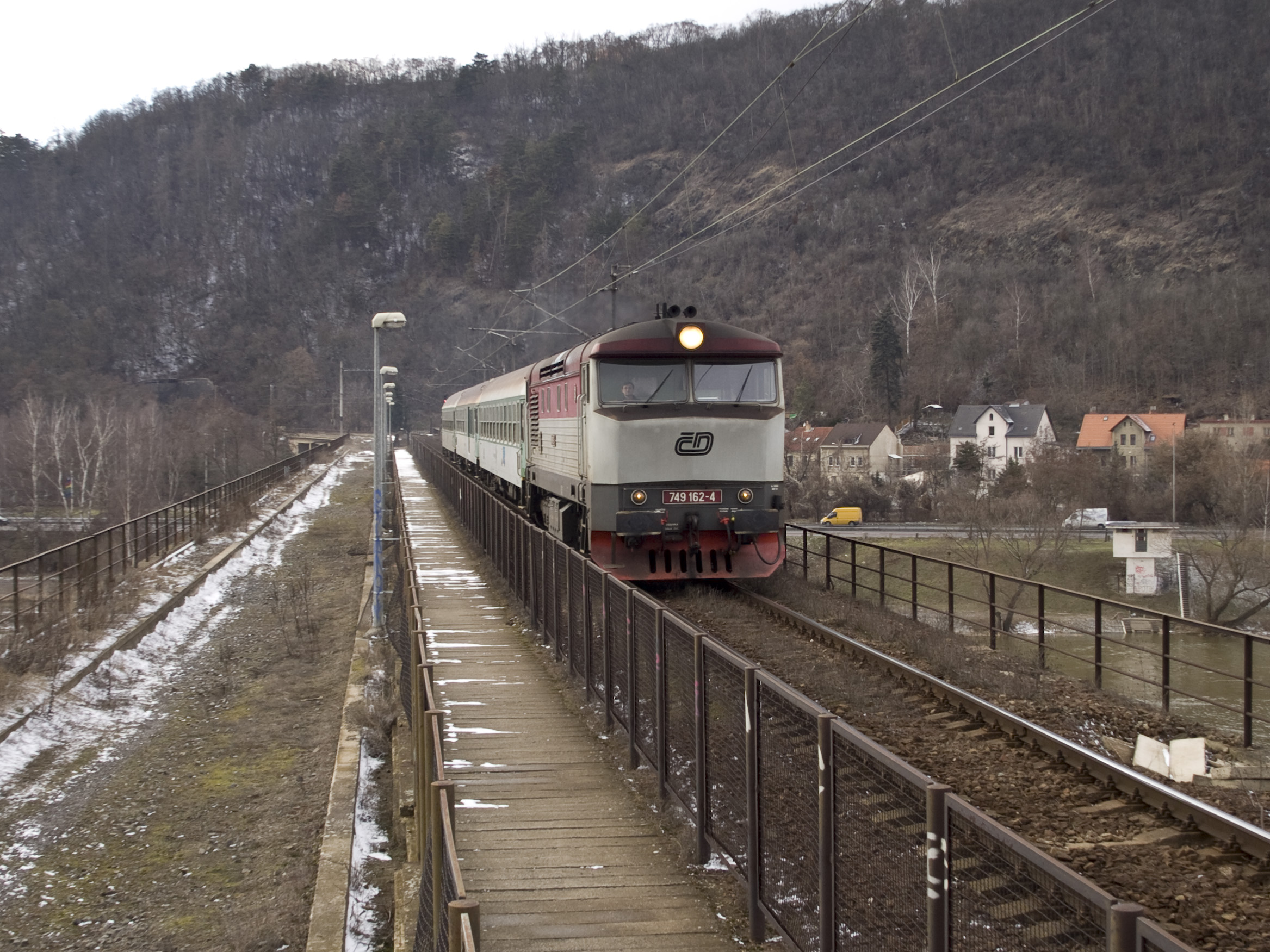
The bridge deck

Braník Bridge (Czech: Branický most), also known as the Bridge of the Intelligentsia (Czech: most intelligence) is a reinforced-concrete rail bridge with a pedestrian path in Prague, Czech Republic, crossing the Vltava river from Malá Chuchle to the border of Braník and Hodkovičky. The bridge is 910 metres long and 14 metres wide.

As a part of Branická spojka (the Braník Branch Line) the structure links the Prague–Plzeň line to the Nusle–Modřany branch line. The walkway links the Braník district to the Malá Chuchle district.

== History ==
The bridge was planned as a part of the Prague Rail Bypass. Work began in 1949 and the structure was finished in 1955.

== Name ==
The bridge is commonly known as the Braník Bridge after the Braník district. However its unofficial name, the Bridge of the Intelligentsia, is more popular with older residents of the city. After the communist coup d'état of 1948, Czechoslovak intelligentsia were forced to work as labourers. Large numbers of Prague intellectuals (lawyers, philosophers, teachers, etc.) worked on the bridge, giving it its unofficial name.
