= Václav Kahuda =

Czech novelist (1965–2023)

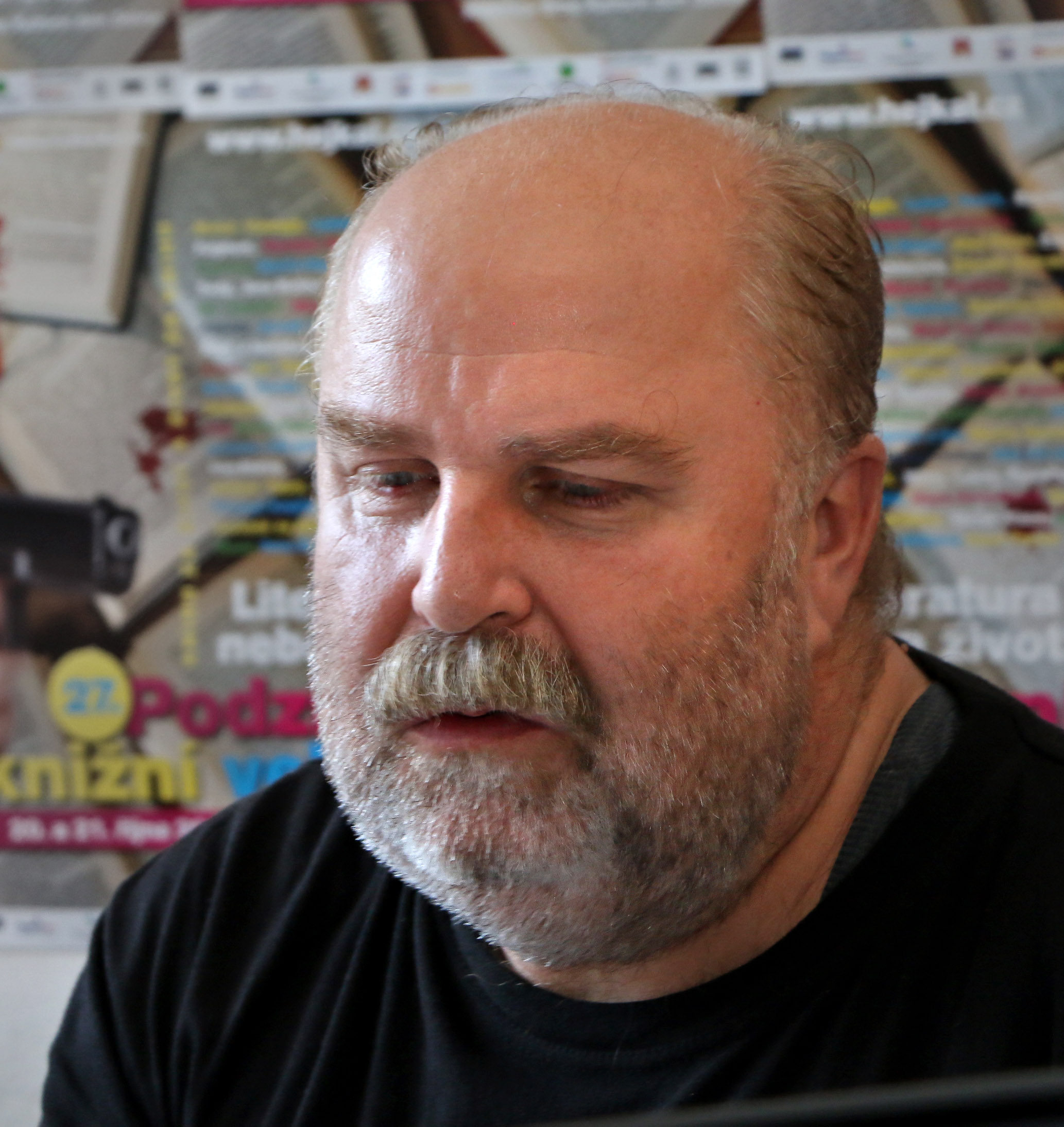
Václav Kahuda

Václav Kahuda (8 November 1965 – 24 July 2023) was a Czech novelist.

== Biography ==
Kahuda was born in Prague. He trained as a plasterer and worked repairing facades, also working variously as a night watchman, an engineer at a sewage works, a heating operator, and a gravedigger. He received a disability pension. He was involved in the founding of the punk band Tři sestry. Together with Oscar Ryba and Skioll Podraga he founded Branické almanachy in the Braník district of Prague.
