= Braník =

Neighborhood of Prague, Czechia

- Cadastral Area of Prague
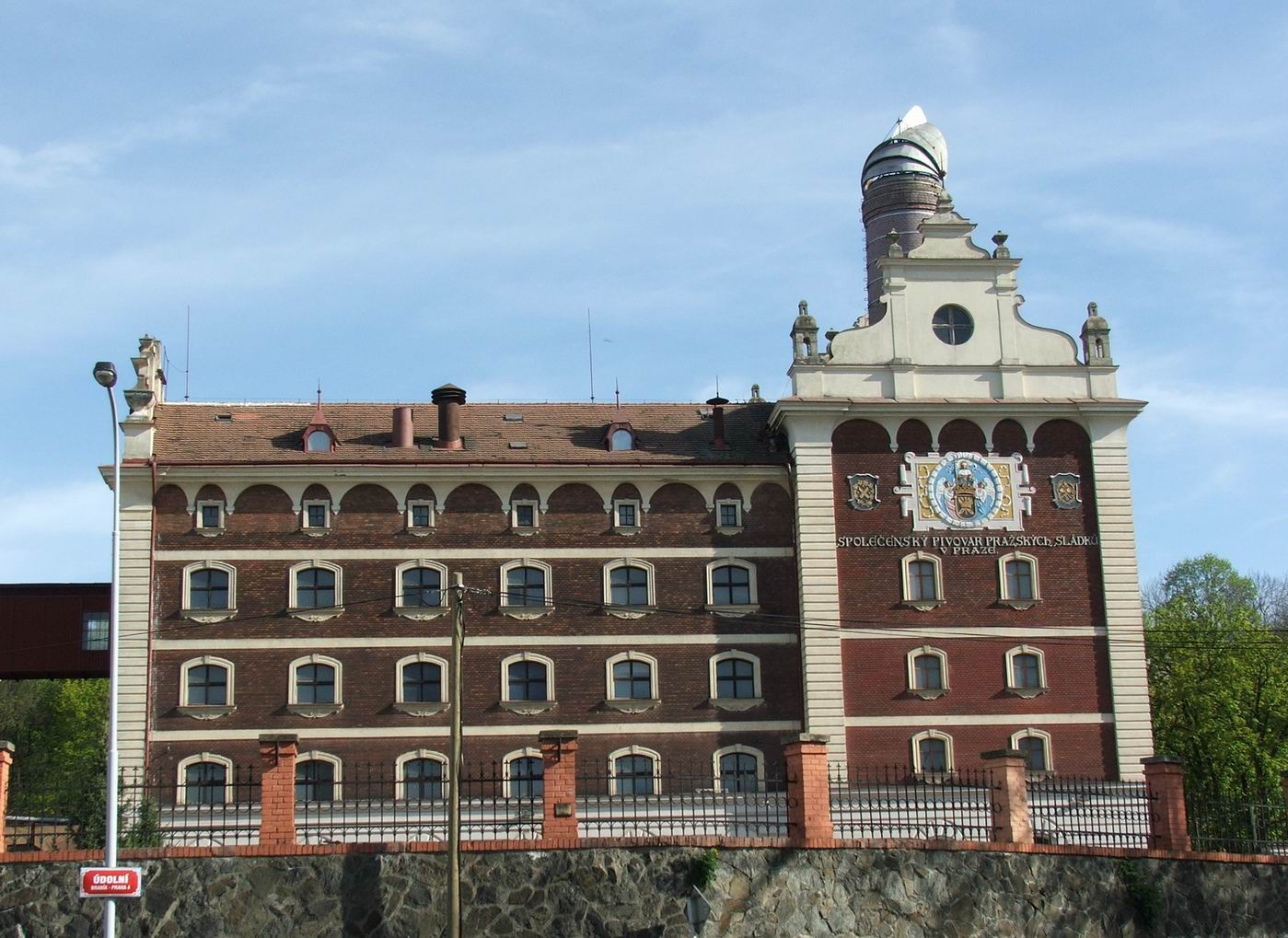
- The Braník brewery

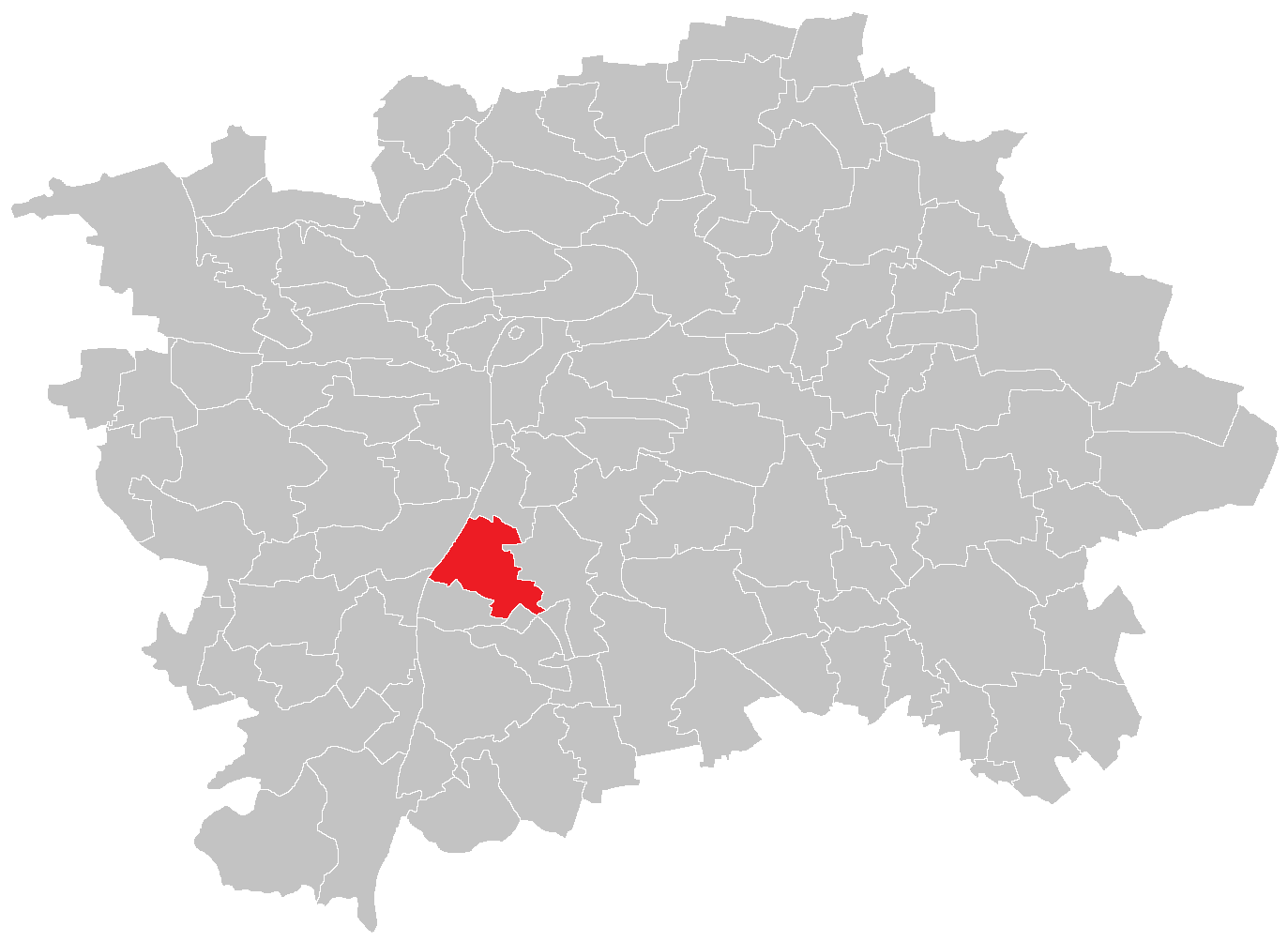
- Location of Braník in Prague
- Coordinates: 50°01′59″N 14°25′16″E
- Country: Czech Republic
- Region: Prague
- District: Prague 4

Area
  - Total: 4.40 km^{2} (1.70 sq mi)

Population (2021)
  - Total: 17,777
  - Density: 4,040/km^{2} (10,500/sq mi)
- Time zone: UTC+1 (CET)
  - Summer (DST): UTC+2 (CEST)
- Postal code: 147 00

Braník (sometimes inaccurately called Bráník) is a district and cadastral area in Prague, Czech Republic, located in the south of the city, on the east bank of the Vltava. It used to be known for its brewery, but the brewery is now out of business as it ceased operations in 2002. Braník borders with Malá Chuchle and Hlubočepy in the west, Podolí in the north, Krč in the east and Lhotka and Hodkovičky in the south.

== Demographics ==
Historical population

Year	Pop.	±%
1869	1,520	—
1880	1,847	+21.5%
1890	2,334	+26.4%
1900	3,178	+36.2%
1910	3,616	+13.8%

Year	Pop.	±%
1921	3,581	−1.0%
1930	6,738	+88.2%
1950	11,594	+72.1%
1961	12,646	+9.1%
1970	20,612	+63.0%

Year	Pop.	±%
1980	22,883	+11.0%
1991	20,541	−10.2%
2001	18,445	−10.2%
2011	18,455	+0.1%
2021	17,777	−3.7%

Source: Censuses
