= Robert Gersuny =

Austrian surgeon (1844–1924)

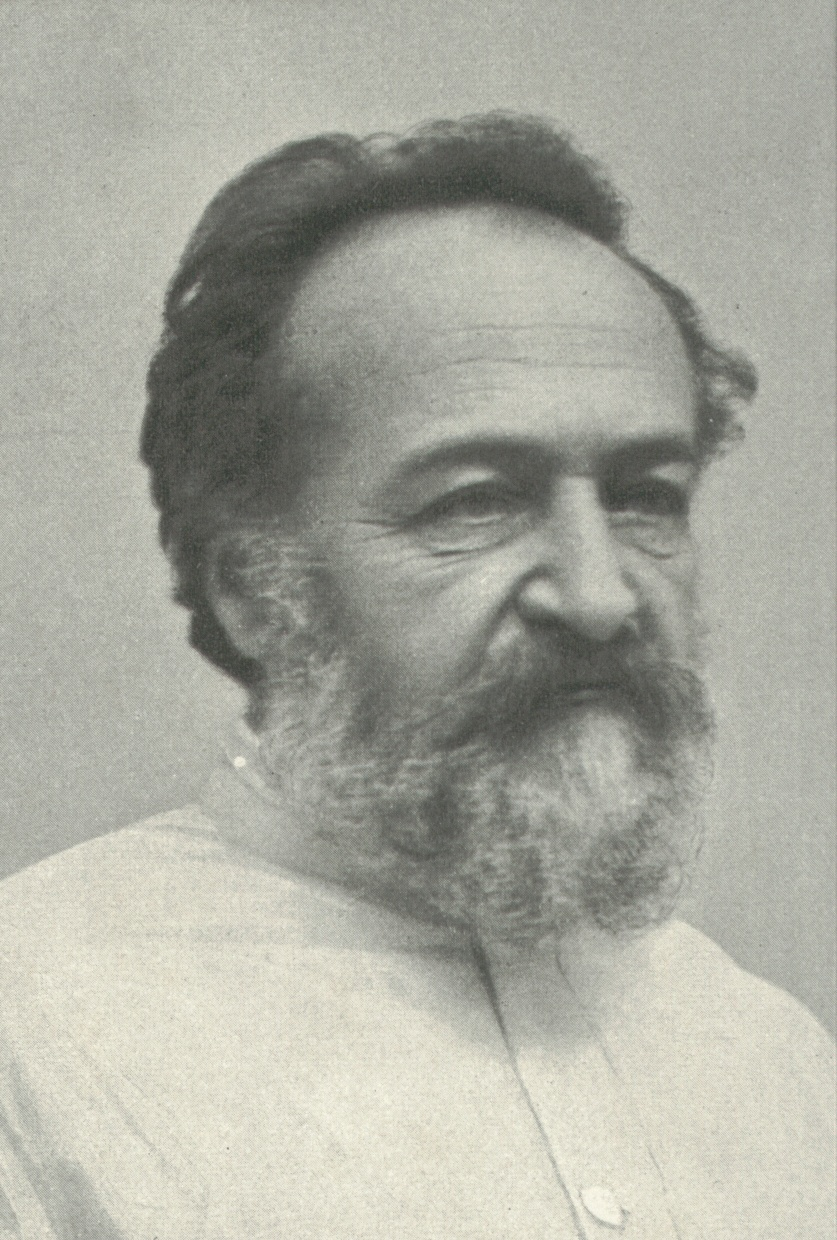
- Born: 15 January 1844; Teplitz, Bohemia
- Died: 31 October 1924 (aged 80); Vienna
- Occupation: Surgeon

Robert Gersuny (15 January 1844 in Teplitz, Bohemia – 31 October 1924 in Vienna) was an Austrian surgeon.

Gersuny was the second child of a respected balneologist in Teplitz (modern Teplice, Czech Republic). His father was not only a surgeon and obstetrician, but also practiced internal medicine and dentistry. His desire to be of help to others caused him to consider the clergy as a profession before settling on a medical career. He began his medical studies in 1861 at the Charles University in Prague, where he was active in the Corps Austria. He graduated from medical school in 1866.

After reading Theodor Billroth's Allgemeine Chirurgie ("General Surgery"), Dr. Gersuny applied for a position with Billroth at the University of Vienna's Second Surgical University Clinic. He was accepted and assumed employment there in October, 1869 leading to a lifelong friendship between the two physicians. He accompanied Billroth on his journeys as a consultant to Poland, Russia and Africa. From 1880 to 1893 Gersuny was chief surgeon at Karolinen-Kinderspital in Vienna. In 1882 Gersuny became Primarius (Department Chairman of the Rudolfinerhaus, a hospital in Vienna, founded by Billroth, which included a nursing school. After Billroth's death in 1894, Gersuny took over as director of the entire hospital until his death in 1924.

Dr. Gersuny is known primarily for his contributions to the field of plastic surgery. He is known for his use of paraffin and vaseline as media for injection, which had disastrous results in some of the earliest examples of breast augmentation.

In 1924 a street in the Döbling district (19th District) of Vienna was named the Gersunygasse in his honor.

== Publications ==
- Arzt und Patient. Vienna, 1884
- Über falsche Diagnosen. Vienna, 1887
- Bemerkungen über das Spezialistentum in der Medizin. Vienna, 1892
- Bodensatz des Lebens, Hugo Heller & Co., Vienna/Leipzig, 1906 (Aphorisms)
- Theodor Billroth. In: Meister der Heilkunde. Volume 4, Vienna/Berlin/Leipzig/Munich, Rikola Verlag, 1922.
