= Podolí Waterworks =

Coordinates: 50°04′N 14°25′E

- Podolská vodárna
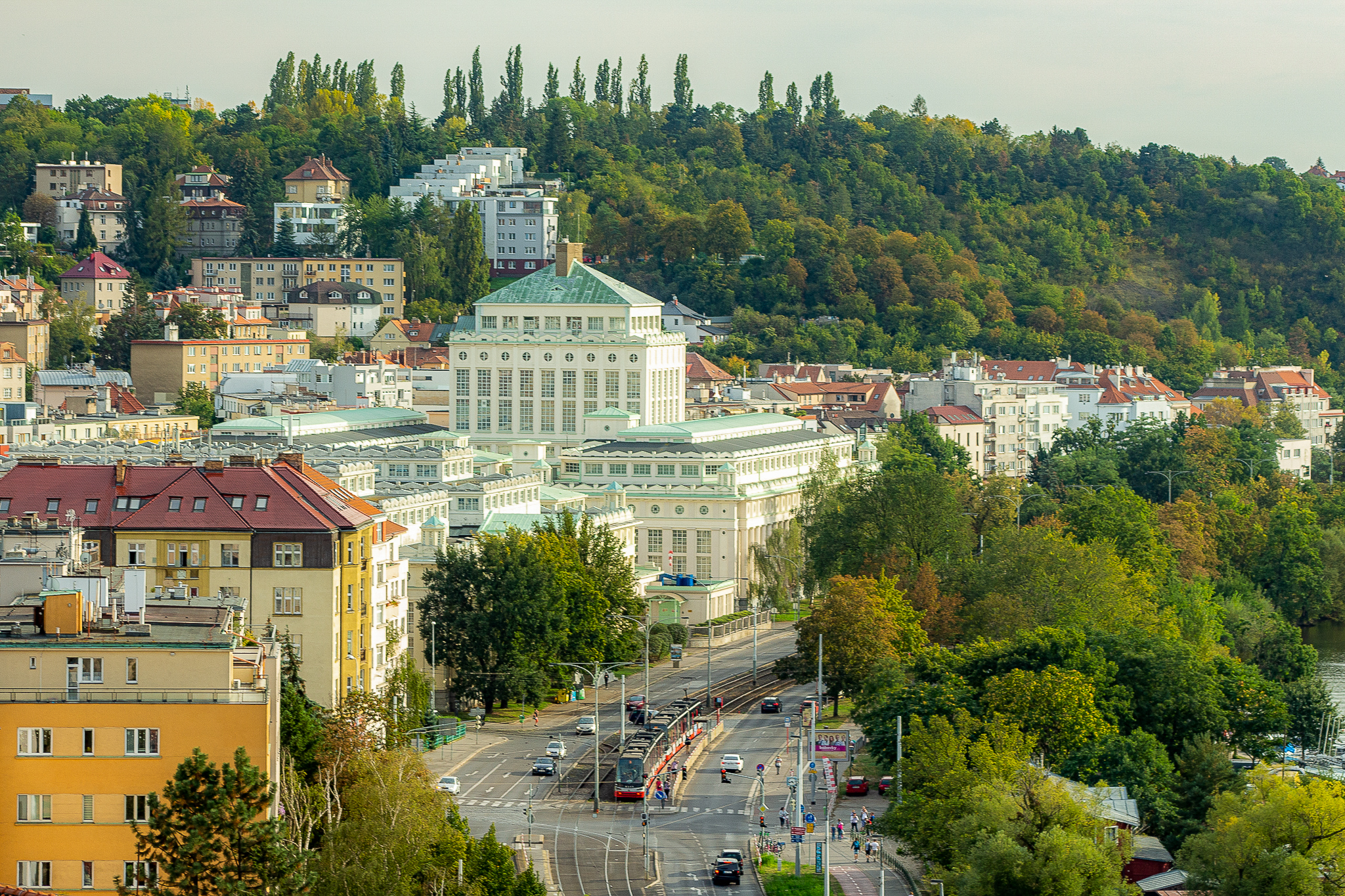
- Podolí Waterworks building in 2020

General information
- Architectural style: neoclassical architecture
- Location: Podolí, Prague
- Construction started: 1925
- Completed: 1929
- Renovated: 1990s

Podolí Waterworks (in Czech: Podolská vodárna) is a big water supply equipment located in the capital city of the Czech Republic, Prague, neighborhood Podolí. More precisely, it is located in Prague 4 on the right side of Vltava river between Vyšehrad and Swimming stadium Podolí (Plavecký stadium Podolí). The current complex was built between 1925–1929 on the place where former water supply infrastructure was located. In 1990s, it was completely reconstructed. From 2003, it serves only as backup water source in case of failure of other treatment plants. The complex was built in neoclassical architecture style and it is protected as a Cultural monument. It also serves as a Prague Waterworks Museum.
