= Anton Tausche =

Bohemian-Austrian politician and agrarian expert (1838–1898)

Anton Tausche (27 July 1838 – 20 November 1898) was a German-Bohemian teacher, author, and politician. Much of his teaching and writing concerned improvement in farming methods. The town of Výsluní gave him honorary citizenship for his work in improving crop yields.

== Life and career ==
Tausche was born in Teplice. After graduating, he studied agricultural science at the German Polytechnic Institute in Prague and joined the Corps Austria Frankfurt am Main in 1862. He then moved to Mosonmagyaróvár, where he studied to be an agricultural teacher, graduating in 1864. He took a position in 1868 as adjunct agricultural inspector for aristocratic land holdings in Žatec. In 1876 he became an economic inspector in Tábor.

He entered politics in 1876 as a district representative of Milevsko. While working as an itinerant agricultural teacher, he witnessed a potato crop failure and pushed for improved farming methods. His successful efforts led to his 1877 appointment as head of all itinerant teachers in German districts of Bohemia. In 1879 the Imperial Council elected him a Member of Parliament for the Cheb, Skalná, and Aš districts, which required him to give up his teaching position. In 1883 he was also appointed a Member of Parliament for the Doupov region. He served until 1897 and died in Teplitz-Schönau.

== Selected publications ==
- Community instructions for profitable potato production (Gemeinfaßliche Anleitung zum einträglichen Kartoffelbau) (1878)
- Community instructions for efficient fertilizer husbandry (Gemeinfaßliche Anleitung zur rationellen Düngerwirthschaft) (1879)
- How to grow fruit in Bohemia (Was für die Hebung des Obstbaues besonders in Böhmen noth thut) (1882)
- The school garden in agricultural relationship Der Schulgarten in landwirtschaftlicher Beziehung) (1886)
