= Zahrádky (Česká Lípa District) =

- Municipality
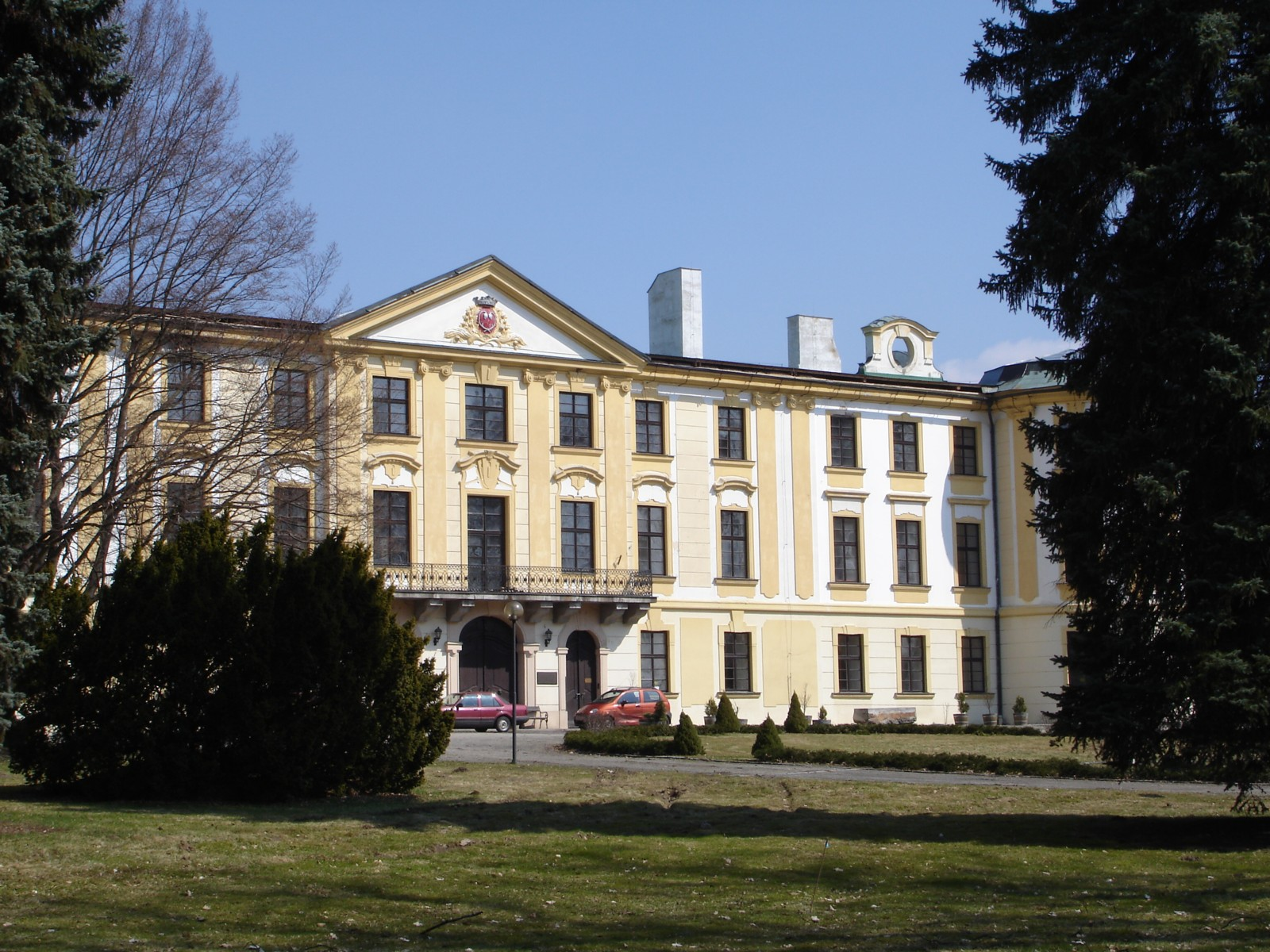
- Zahrádky Castle

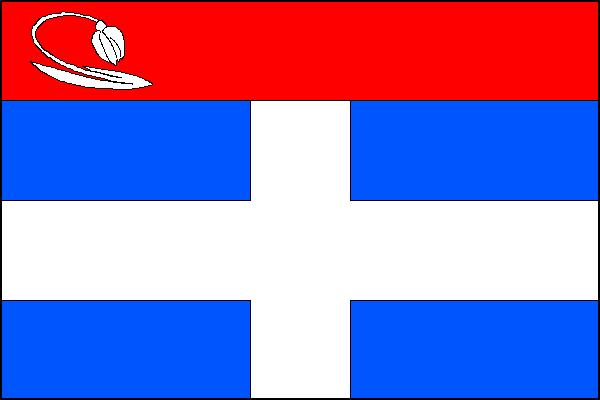
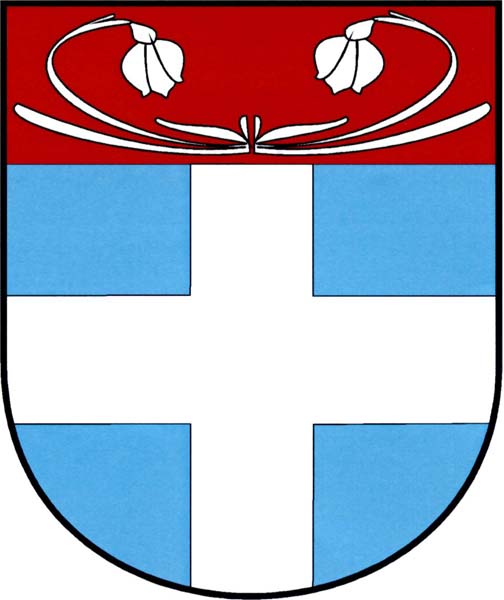
- Flag Coat of arms

- Location in the Czech Republic
- Coordinates: 50°38′3″N 14°31′29″E
- Country: Czech Republic
- Region: Liberec
- District: Česká Lípa
- First mentioned: 1376

Area
  - Total: 10.07 km^{2} (3.89 sq mi)
- Elevation: 260 m (850 ft)

Population (2026-01-01)
  - Total: 708
  - Density: 70.3/km^{2} (182/sq mi)
- Time zone: UTC+1 (CET)
  - Summer (DST): UTC+2 (CEST)
- Postal code: 471 01
- Website: www.zahradkycl.cz

Zahrádky (German: Neugarten) is a municipality and village in Česká Lípa District in the Liberec Region of the Czech Republic. It has about 700 inhabitants.

== Administrative division ==
Zahrádky consists of three municipal parts (in brackets population according to the 2021 census):

- Zahrádky (629)
- Borek (41)
- Šváby (11)

== Demographics ==
Historical population
Year	Pop.	±%
1869	1,316	—
1880	1,282	−2.6%
1890	1,175	−8.3%
1900	1,155	−1.7%
1910	1,050	−9.1%
1921	1,198	+14.1%
1930	1,194	−0.3%
1950	855	−28.4%
1961	671	−21.5%
1970	547	−18.5%
1980	603	+10.2%
1991	556	−7.8%
2001	583	+4.9%
2011	636	+9.1%
2021	681	+7.1%
Source: Censuses

== Notable people ==
- Josef Neuwirth (1855–1934), Austrian art historian and architect
