= Josef Neuwirth =

Austrian art historian and architect

Josef Neuwirth (5 June 1855, Neugarten – 25 April 1934, Vienna) was an Austrian art historian and architect.

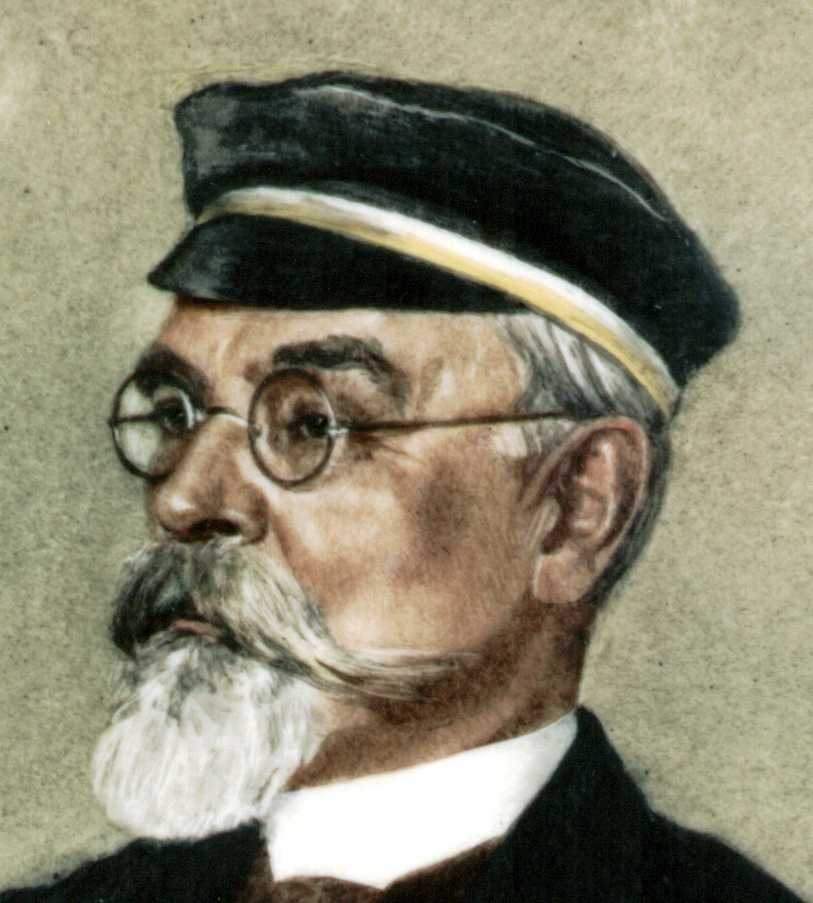
Josef Neuwirth

== Education and academic career ==
From 1875 to 1878, he studied history, classical philology, art history and archaeology at the German University in Prague. He passed his teaching examination in 1880, received his doctorate in 1882 and habilitated in 1885 as a Privatdozent for art history at the German University in Prague; he continued to work as a Gymnasium (secondary-school) teacher until his appointment as an associate professor at Prague in 1894. In 1897 he attained a full professorship, relocating to Vienna two years later, where he was a professor of art history with special attention to architecture at the Vienna University of Technology. In 1903–05 he was university rector and in 1920–25, he served as dean to the faculty of architecture.

He was chairman of the Vereins für Geschichte der Stadt Wien, and from 1905 to 1914, he served as curator of the Austro-Hungarian Central Commission for the study and conservation of art and historical monuments.

His written works largely dealt with issues involving medieval architectural history, with his interest in art and architecture being based on historical objectivity with little regard to aesthetics.

== Selected works ==
- Illustrierte Kunstgeschichte, 1900 – Illustrated art history.
- Prag, 1901 – Prague.
- Handbuch der Kunstgeschichte, 1902 (with Anton Heinrich Springer and Adolf Michaelis) – Textbook of art history.
- Geschichte der Baukunst, 1904 (with Richard Borrmann) – History of architecture.
- Frühchristliche Kunst und Mittelalter, 1913 (with Anton Heinrich Springer) – Early Christian art and the Middle Ages.
