= Malá Chuchle =

Coordinates: 50°01′26″N 14°23′24″E

- Cadastral Area of Prague
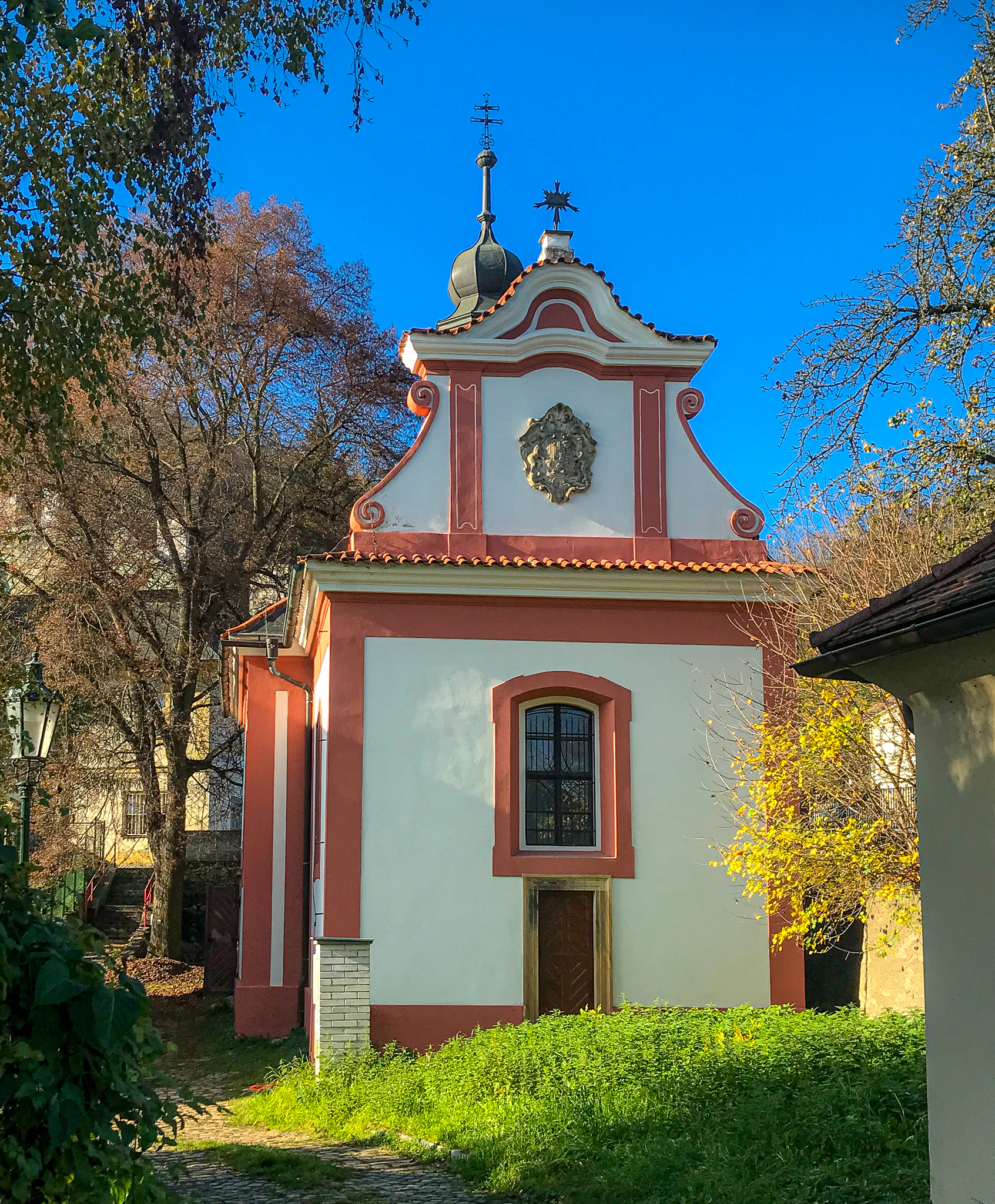
- Local church

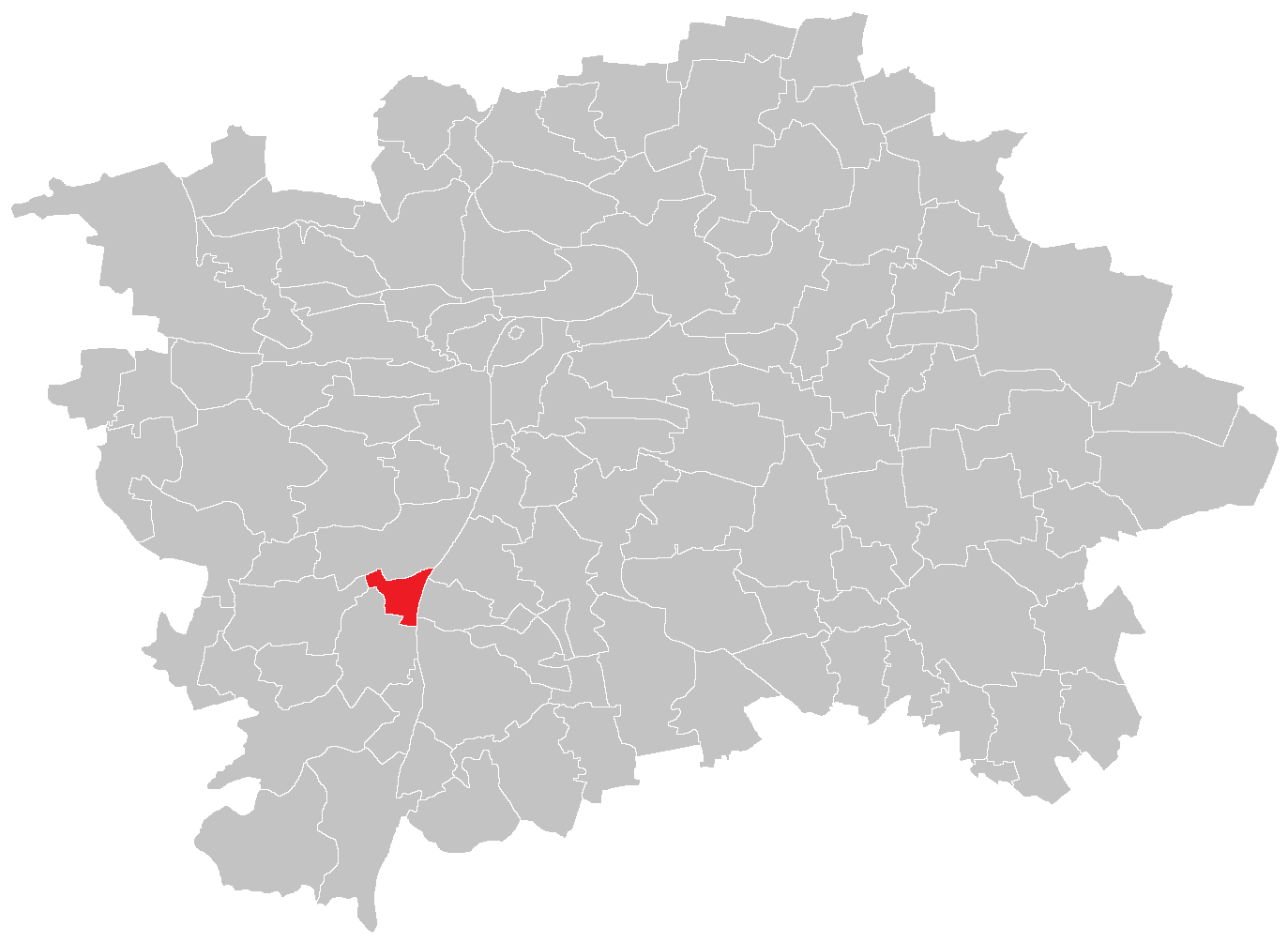
- Location of Malá Chuchle in Prague
- Country: Czech Republic
- Region: Prague
- District: Prague 5

Population (2021)
  - Total: 289
- Time zone: UTC+1 (CET)
  - Summer (DST): UTC+2 (CEST)

Malá Chuchle is a cadastral area of Prague, Czech Republic and one of its quarters. Until 1922 it used to be part of a neighbouring village of Velká Chuchle. It joined Prague in 1968.

The most important historical monuments of Malá Chuchle include baroque church from the year 1774, area of historical baths and small rock chapel.
