= Richard Borrmann =

Richard Borrmann (27 December 1852 in Grudziądz – 26 March 1931 in Berlin) was a German architect and classical archaeologist. He was involved in the German Archaeological project at Olympia, Greece.

From 1874 to 1878, he studied at the Bauakademie in Berlin, later serving as a professor of architectural history at Technische Universität Berlin (1903–1921). He specialized in ancient architectural history, and also made significant contributions in the field of Islamic art history, of which, he performed studies of its decorative architectural elements from ancient to modern times.

== Selected works ==
His best written effort was an inventory of architectural and artistic monuments of Berlin titled Die Bau- und Kunstdenkmäler von Berlin. Im Auftrage des Magistrats der Stadt Berlin (1893). Other significant writings by Borrmann are:

- Die Keramik in der Baukunst, 1897 – Ceramics in architecture.
- Die Alhambra zu Granada, 1900 – The Alhambra at Granada.
- Moderne Keramik, 1902 – Modern ceramics.
- Die Baukunst des Altertums und des Islam im Mittelalter, 1904 – The architecture of antiquity and of Islam in the Middle Ages.
- Geschichte der Baukunst, 1904 – History of architecture, (with Josef Neuwirth).
- Vom Städtebau im islamischen Osten, 1914 – On urban planning in the Islamic East.

He also made contributions to the five-volume Olympia; die ergebnisse der von dem Deutschen Reich veranstalteten ausgrabung (Olympia: the results of the excavation organized by the German Reich), published from 1890 to 1897 (with various authors, including Ernst Curtius and Friedrich Adler).
