= Lhotka (Prague) =

- Cadastral area of Prague
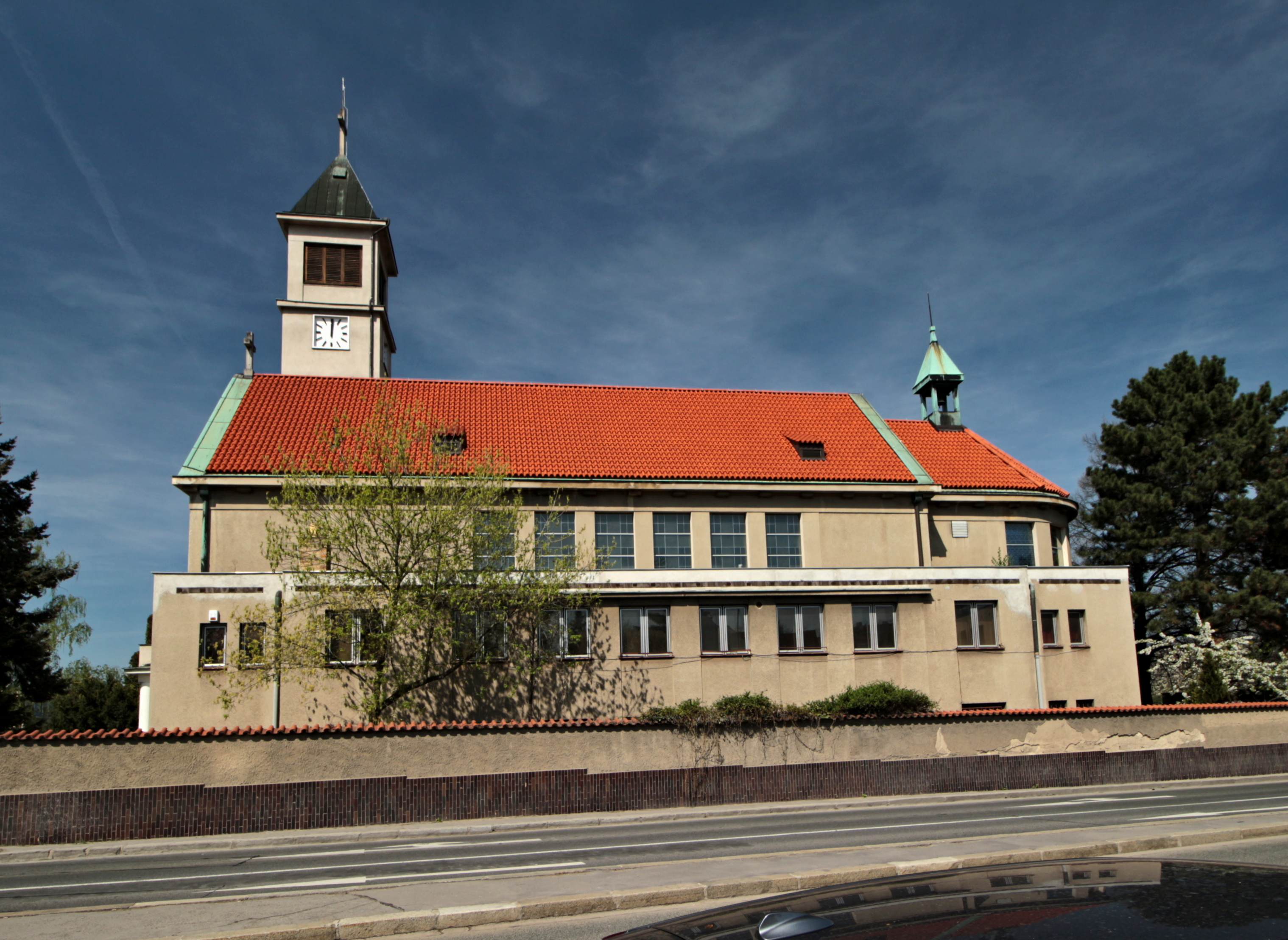
- Local church

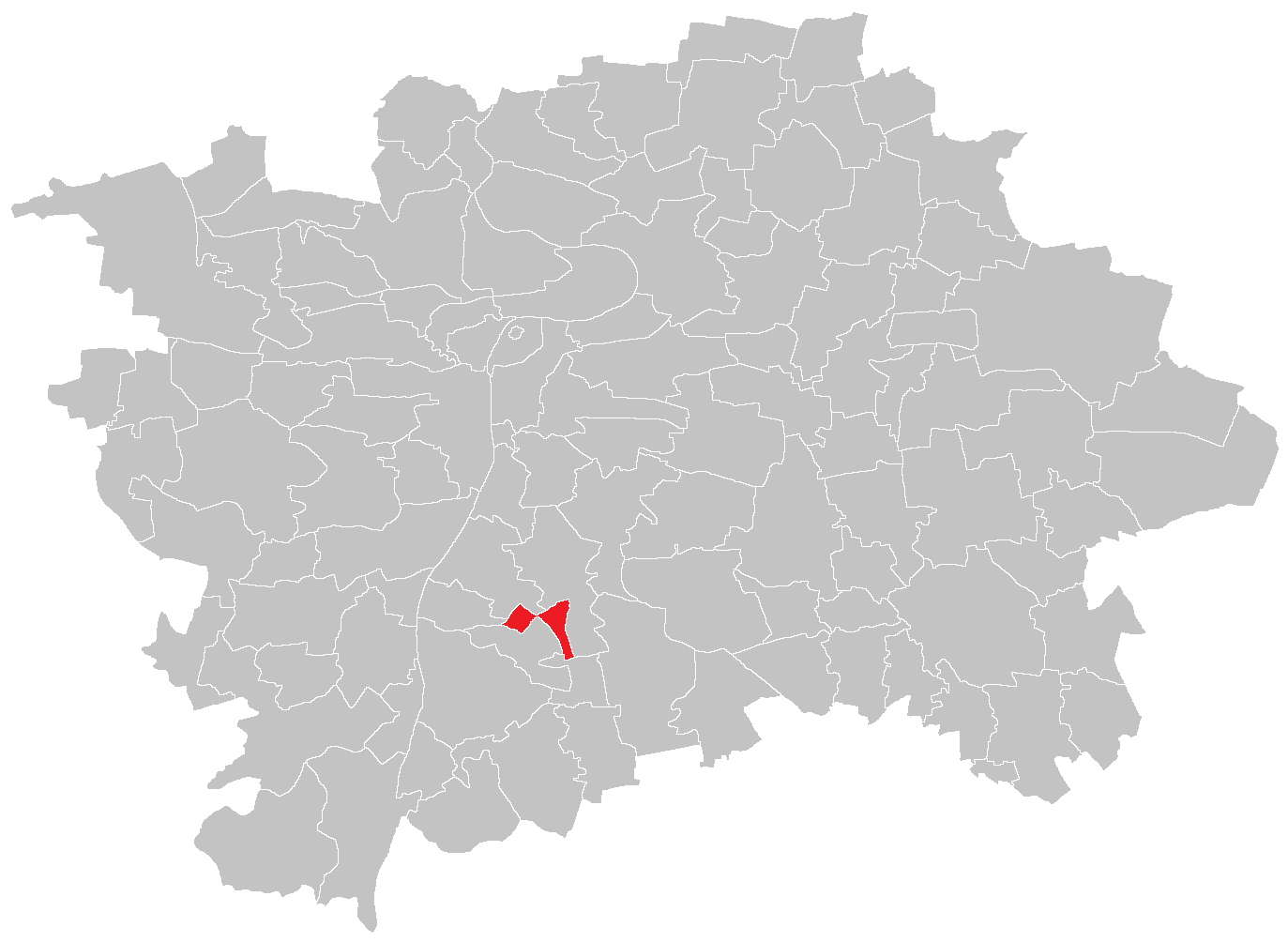
- Location of Lhotka in Prague
- Coordinates: 50°01′23″N 14°26′25″E
- Country: Czech Republic
- Region: Prague
- District: Prague 4

Area
  - Total: 1.05 km^{2} (0.41 sq mi)

Population (2021)
  - Total: 5,692
  - Density: 5,420/km^{2} (14,000/sq mi)
- Time zone: UTC+1 (CET)
  - Summer (DST): UTC+2 (CEST)
- Postal code: 142 00

Lhotka is a cadastral area of Prague, Czech Republic. It is part of the district of Prague 4. It has about 5,700 inhabitants.

== History ==
Before joining Prague in 1922, it used to be a separate village. Nowadays, there are housing estates of large panel system panel buildings (paneláky) in the district, as well as parts with villas.

== Demographics ==
Historical population

Year	Pop.	±%
1869	252	—
1880	243	−3.6%
1890	246	+1.2%
1900	225	−8.5%
1910	258	+14.7%
1921	445	+72.5%
1930	995	+123.6%
1950	2,230	+124.1%

Year	Pop.	±%
1961	2,432	+9.1%
1970	4,905	+101.7%
1980	10,998	+124.2%
1991	6,916	−37.1%
2001	6,078	−12.1%
2011	6,050	−0.5%
2021	5,692	−5.9%

Source: Censuses
