= Velká Chuchle =

District in Prague, Czech Republic

Coordinates: 50°01′N 14°23′E

- Municipal District & Cadastral Area of Prague
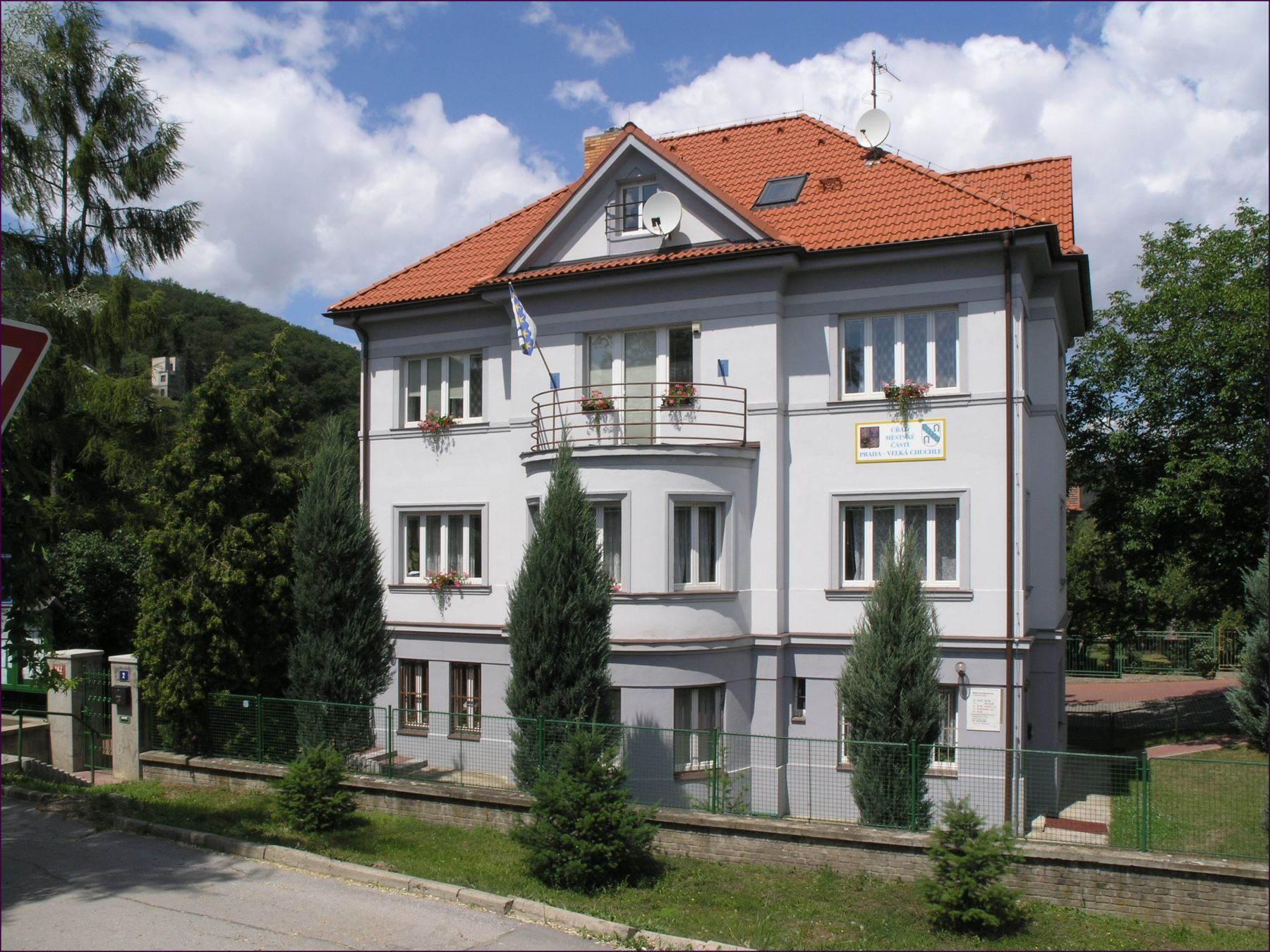
- Municipal office

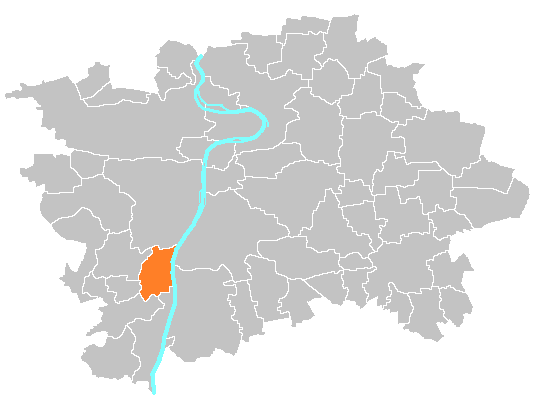
- Location of Velká Chuchle in Prague
- Country: Czechia
- Municipality: Prague

Area
  - Total: 6.03 km^{2} (2.33 sq mi)

Population
  - Total: 2,371
  - Density: 393/km^{2} (1,020/sq mi)

Velká Chuchle is part of Prague situated in the southwest of the city. It is part of Praha 16 administrative district.

The district includes Prague-Velká Chuchle Racecourse, Prague's only horse-racing track, offering flat racing on most Sundays from April to October. The track was founded in 1906.

This horse - racing track ("Hippodroma") was very often visited by the first Czechoslovak president Thomas Garrigue Masaryk, and in 1930, the primary school in Velká Chuchle was named after his wife Charlotte.

On a sunny Sunday, September 6, 2020, the 100th "Czechoslovak" (Czech) derby was held at the racecourse. There was also a great defilé of President Masaryk, represented by a race rider and accompanied by four legionnaires, as well as a parade of racewear of the First Republic. Slovak stallion Opasan won the main race of three-year-old horses with jockey Radek Koplík, so the Slovak anthem was played above the racecourse on this festive day.

Malá Chuchle, a part of Velká Chuchle, is the site of so-called Chuchle battle in 1881.

There is an interesting old limekiln with the duplex Pacold's shaft furnace – unique technical monument from the second half of the 19th century – to see in Velká Chuchle: Streetview Velká Chuchle railway station can be seen here https://www.google.fr/maps/@50.0068861,14.3885872,3a,60.8y,339.47h,93.61t/data=!3m6!1e1!3m4!1svCFxhSSVpY9qWdtC3zDl6Q!2e0!7i16384!8i8192?hl=fr
