= Podolí (Prague) =

District in Prague

- Cadastral Area of Prague
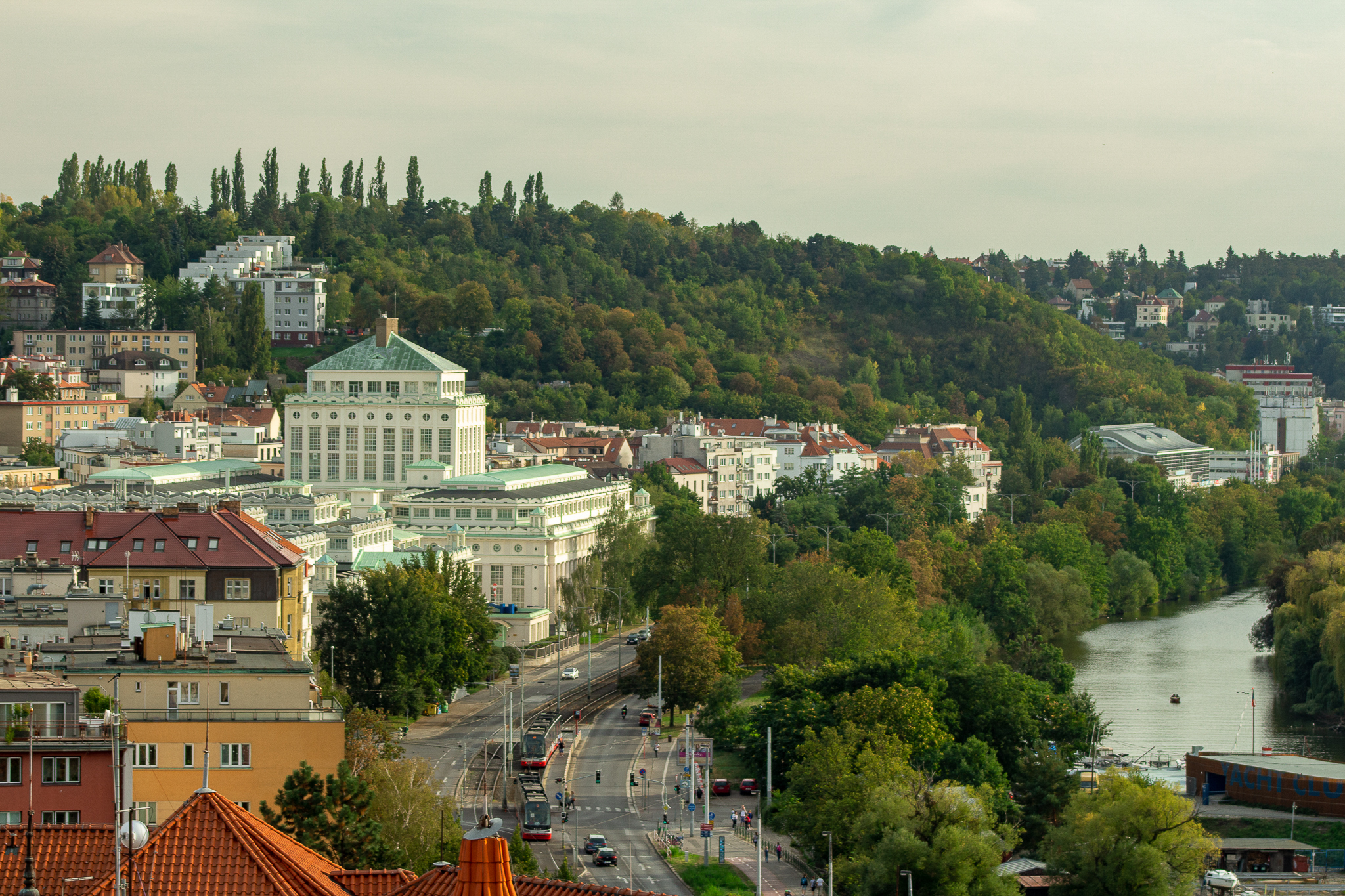
- View of Podolí, Podolí Waterworks in the background

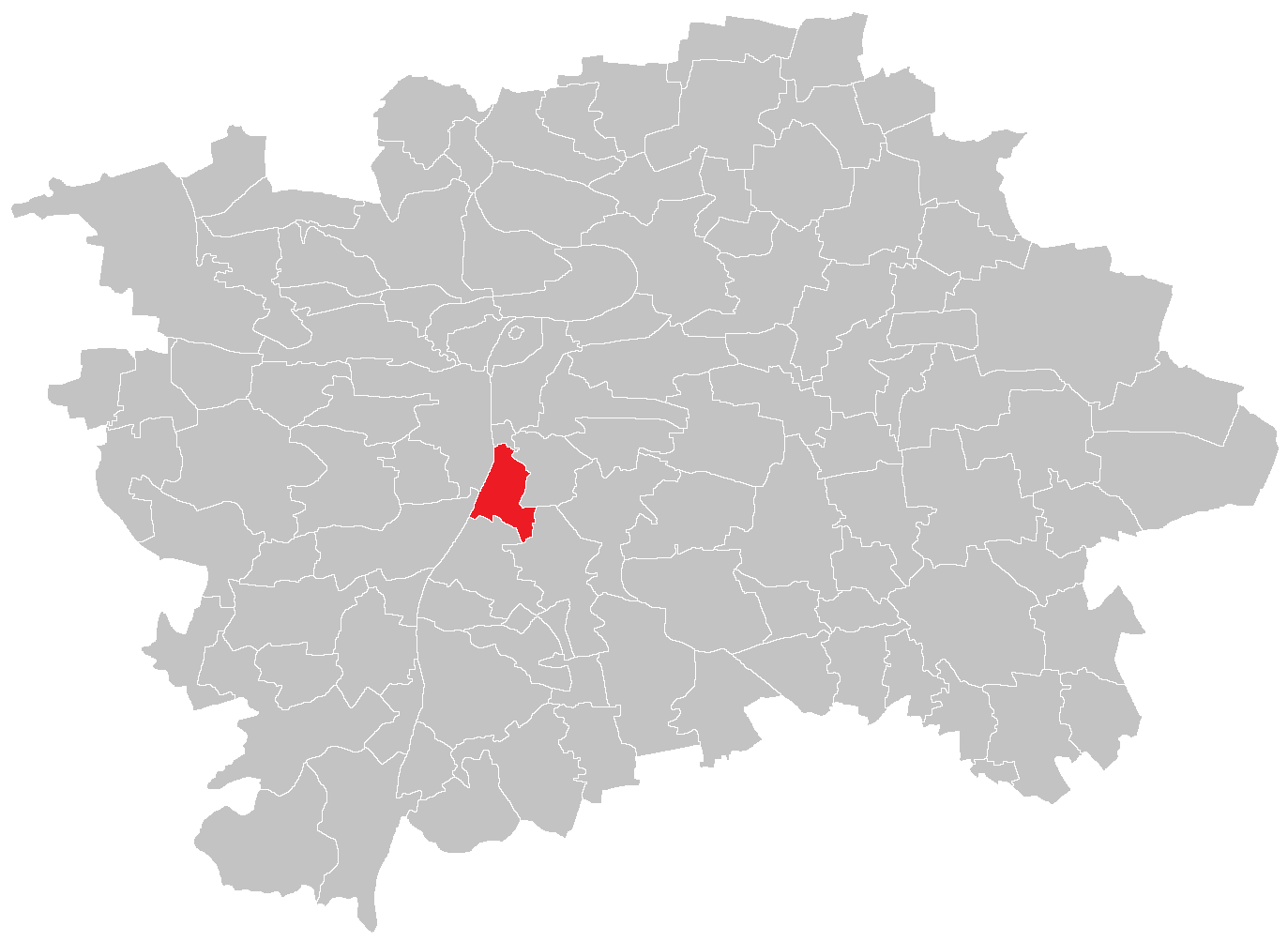
- Location of Podolí in Prague
- Coordinates: 50°03′11″N 14°25′24″E
- Country: Czech Republic
- Region: Prague
- District: Prague 4

Area
  - Total: 2.38 km^{2} (0.92 sq mi)

Population (2021)
  - Total: 13,611
  - Density: 5,720/km^{2} (14,800/sq mi)
- Time zone: UTC+1 (CET)
  - Summer (DST): UTC+2 (CEST)

Podolí is a district in Prague located south of the city centre, on the right (east) riverbank. It borders Vyšehrad in the north, Pankrác (a part of Nusle and Krč districts) in the east and Braník in the south. The river Vltava separates Podolí from Smíchov and Hlubočepy on the other riverbank.

Notable buildings of the district include the neoclassical Podolí Waterworks completed in the 20th century, Church of St. Michael the Archangel which is one of the oldest churches in the whole city or Podolí Swimming Stadium.

== Demographics ==
Historical population

| Year | Pop. | ±% |
|---|---|---|
| 1869 | 1,739 | — |
| 1880 | 2,003 | +15.2% |
| 1890 | 2,582 | +28.9% |
| 1900 | 3,534 | +36.9% |
| 1910 | 4,048 | +14.5% |

| Year | Pop. | ±% |
|---|---|---|
| 1921 | 4,800 | +18.6% |
| 1930 | 8,097 | +68.7% |
| 1950 | 13,630 | +68.3% |
| 1961 | 14,521 | +6.5% |
| 1970 | 17,423 | +20.0% |

| Year | Pop. | ±% |
|---|---|---|
| 1980 | 15,688 | −10.0% |
| 1991 | 14,231 | −9.3% |
| 2001 | 13,403 | −5.8% |
| 2011 | 13,938 | +4.0% |
| 2021 | 13,611 | −2.3% |

Source: Censuses

== Gallery ==
Cement works in Podolí across the Vltava, between 1890 and 1921

Cement works in Podolí, between 1890 and 1921
