= Chuchle battle =

1881 brawl in the Czech Republic

Coordinates: 50°01′27″N 14°23′30″E

Chuchle battle was a student brawl fought in a Chuchle restaurant on June 29, 1881, resulting in several wounds and a general hangover, a swatch of Czech and German chauvinism in the late 19th century, just before the Charles-Ferdinand University was divided into Czech Charles-Ferdinand University and German Charles-Ferdinand University part in 1882.
