= Flag of Prague =

Municipal flag in the Czech Republic

Flag of the capital city of Prague
- Proportion: 2:3
- Adopted: 28 April 1891
- Design: Two equal horizontal bands of yellow (top) and red (bottom)
- Designed by: Josef Emler, 1886

The flag of Prague, officially the flag of the capital city of Prague is one of the symbols of Prague, alongside the coat of arms of Prague.

== History ==
The flag of Prague has a rectangular sheet with an aspect ratio of 2:3 and two equally horizontal horizontal stripes, yellow above red. It was created in connection with the preparation of the Jubilee Provincial Exhibition in 1891, when the royal capital of Prague was preparing a separate pavilion. As early in 1886, the Prague Council decided that the Architect and Painter Bedřich Wachsmann would paint the emblems, colors, and seals of the Prague cities correctly. The Prague archivist Josef Emler determined that the colors of Prague are yellow and red, based on the city's emblem. The flag was adopted at the same year.

== Flags of the districts and municipal parts ==
The 57 districts of Prague and municipal parts have their own flags.

Prague 1

Prague 2

Prague 3

Prague 4

Prague 5

Prague 6

Prague 7

Prague 8

Prague 9

Prague 10

Prague 11

Prague 12

Prague 13

Prague 14

Prague 15

Prague 16

Prague 17

Prague 18

Prague 19

Prague 20

Prague 21

Prague 22

Prague-Běchovice

Prague-Benice

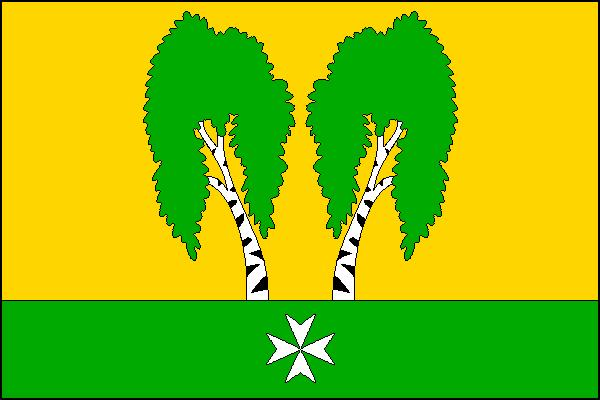
Prague-Březiněves

Prague-Čakovice

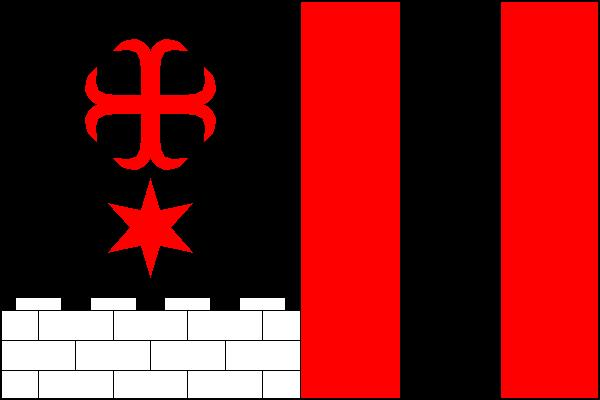
Prague-Ďáblice

Prague-Dolní Chabry

Prague-Dolní Měcholupy

Prague-Dolní Počernice

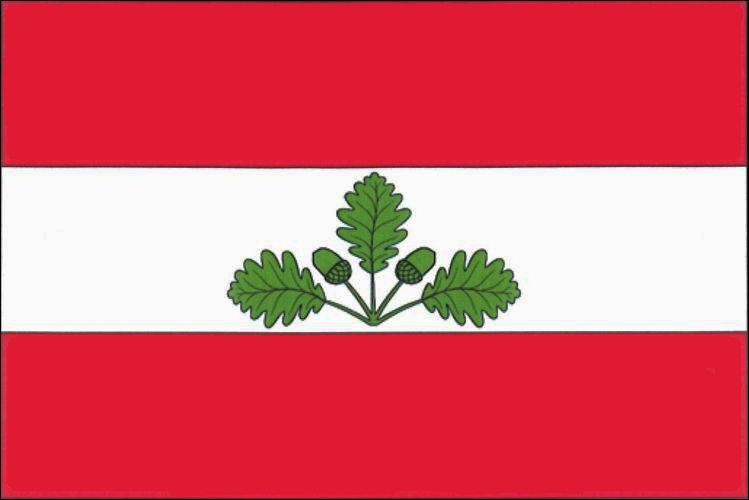
Prague-Dubeč

Prague-Klánovice

Prague-Koloděje

Prague-Kolovraty

Prague-Královice

Prague-Křeslice

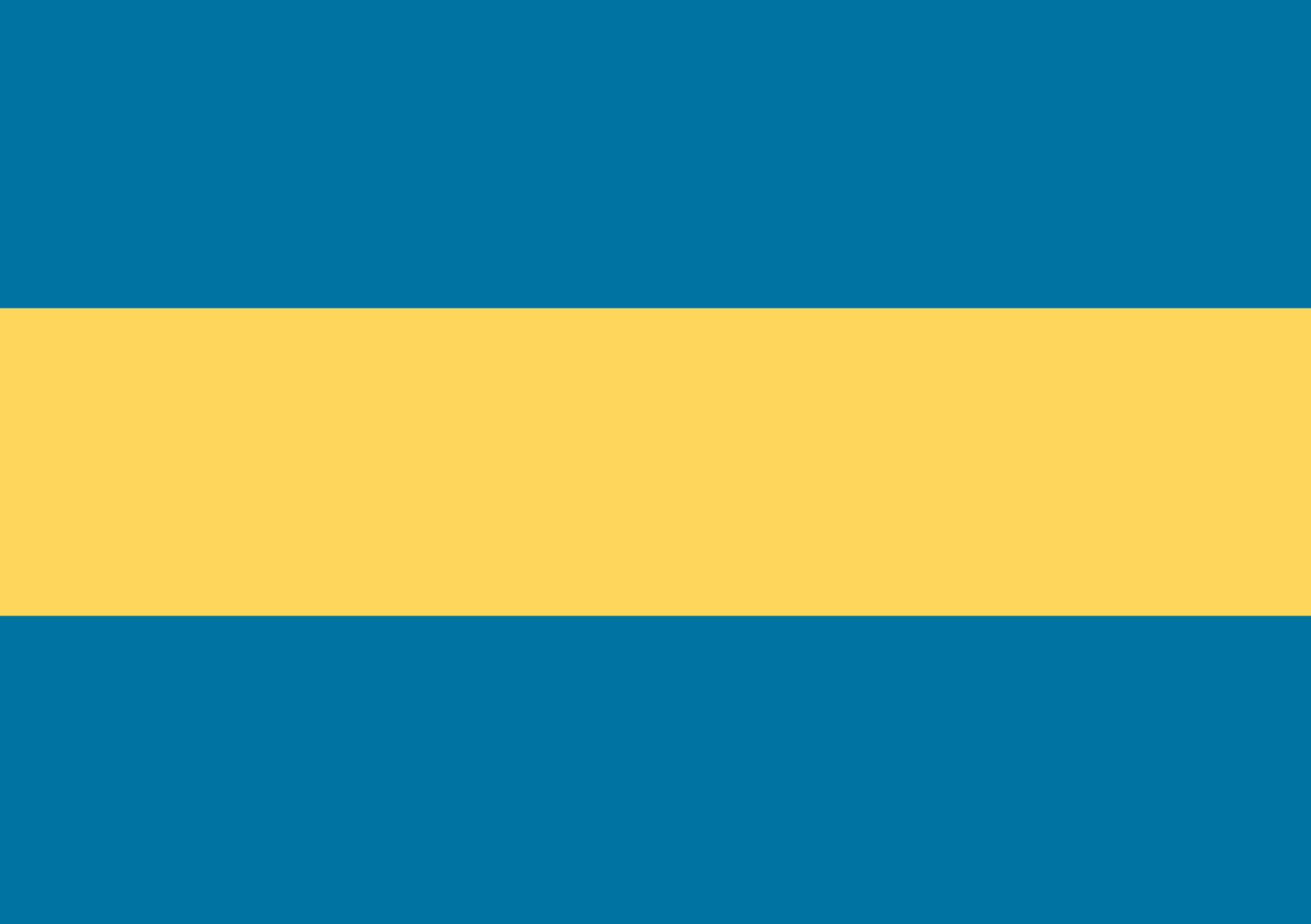
Prague-Kunratice

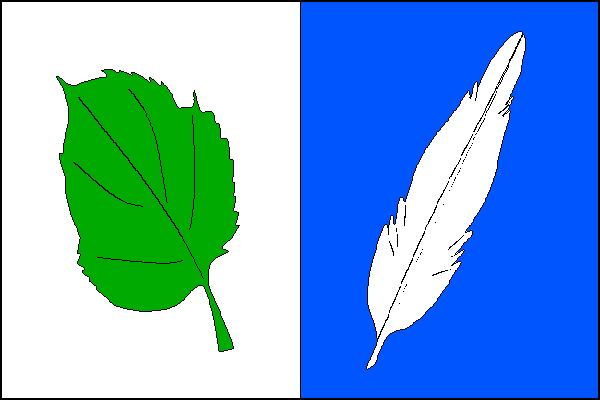
Prague-Libuš

Prague-Lipence

Prague-Lochkov

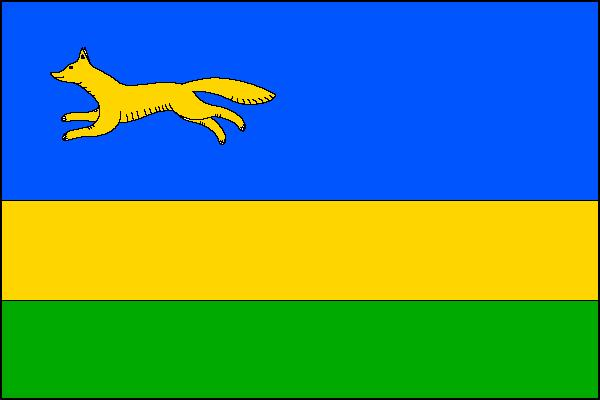
Prague-Lysolaje

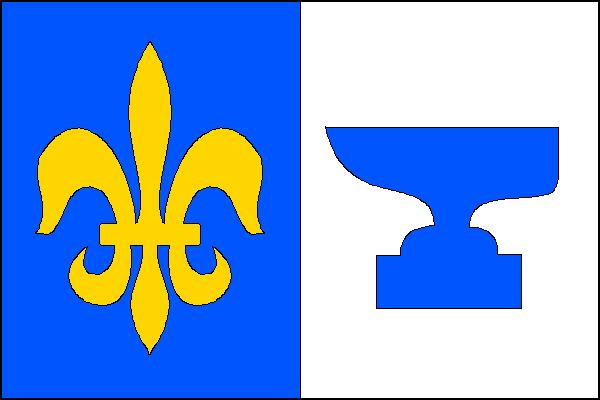
Prague-Nebušice

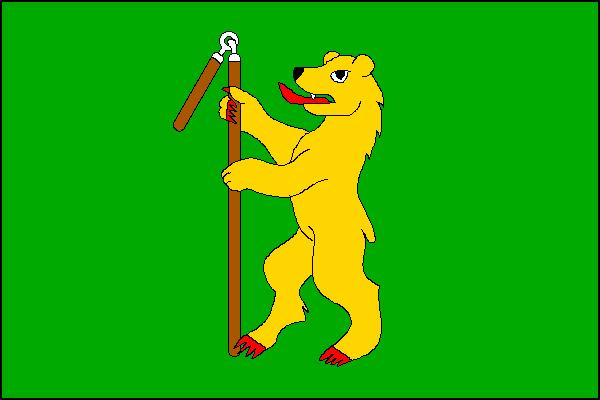
Prague-Nedvězí u Říčan

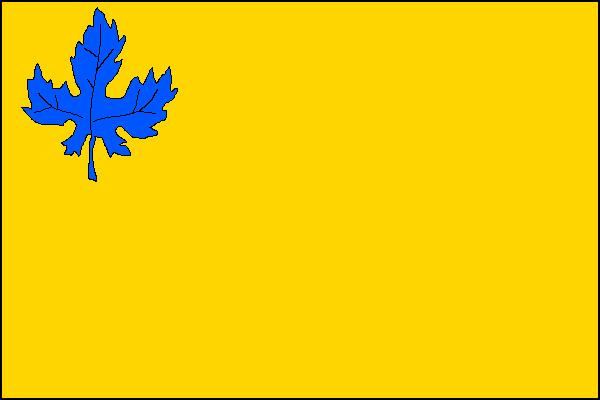
Prague-Petrovice

Prague-Přední Kopanina

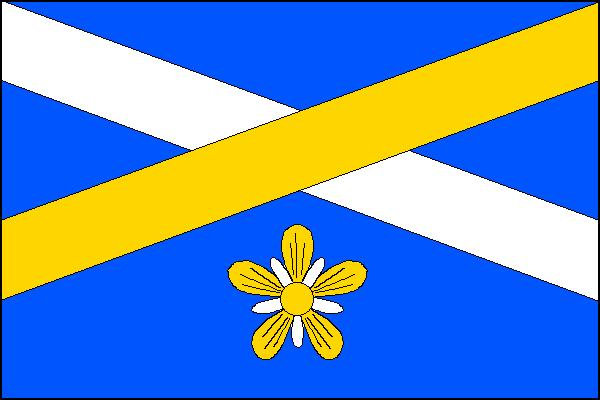
Prague-Řeporyje

Prague-Satalice

Prague-Šeberov

Prague-Slivenec

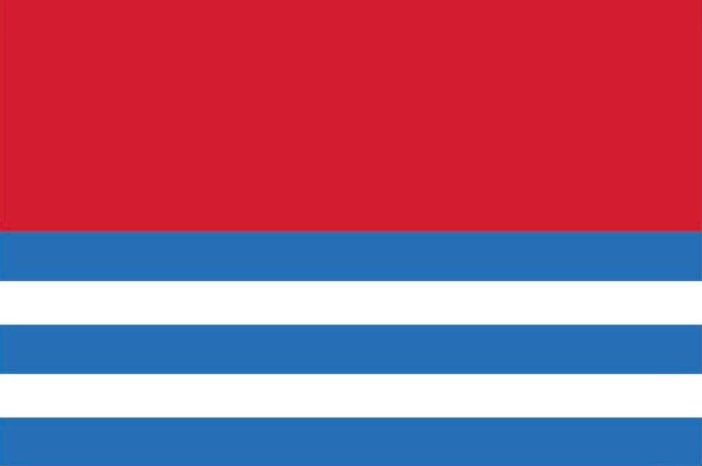
Prague-Suchdol

Prague-Štěrboholy

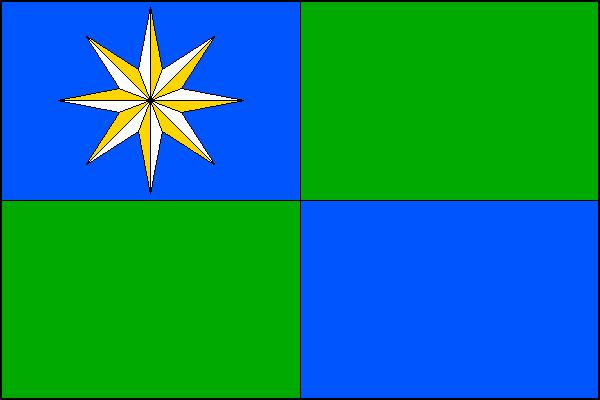
Prague-Troja

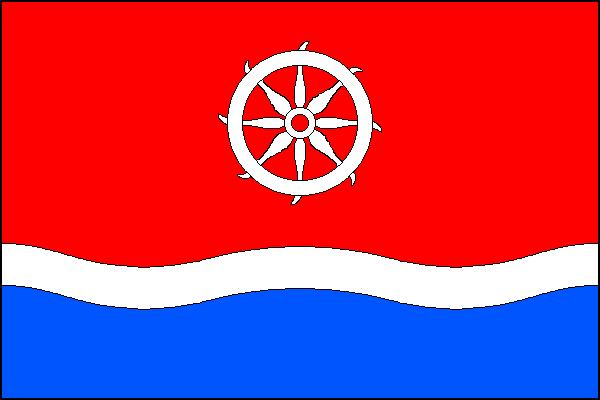
Prague-Újezd u Průhonic

Prague-Velká Chuchle

Prague-Vinoř

Prague-Zbraslav

Prague-Zličín
