= Měcholupy =

Měcholupy may refer to places in the Czech Republic:

- Měcholupy (Louny District), a market town in the Ústí nad Labem
- Měcholupy (Plzeň-South District), a municipality and village in the Plzeň Region
- Měcholupy, a village and part of Předslav in the Plzeň Region
- Dolní Měcholupy, a municipal district in Prague
- Horní Měcholupy, a municipal district in Prague
