= Massacre in Běchovice =

19th Century historical event in modern Czhech Republic

Coordinates: 50°4′52.13″N 14°35′55.99″E

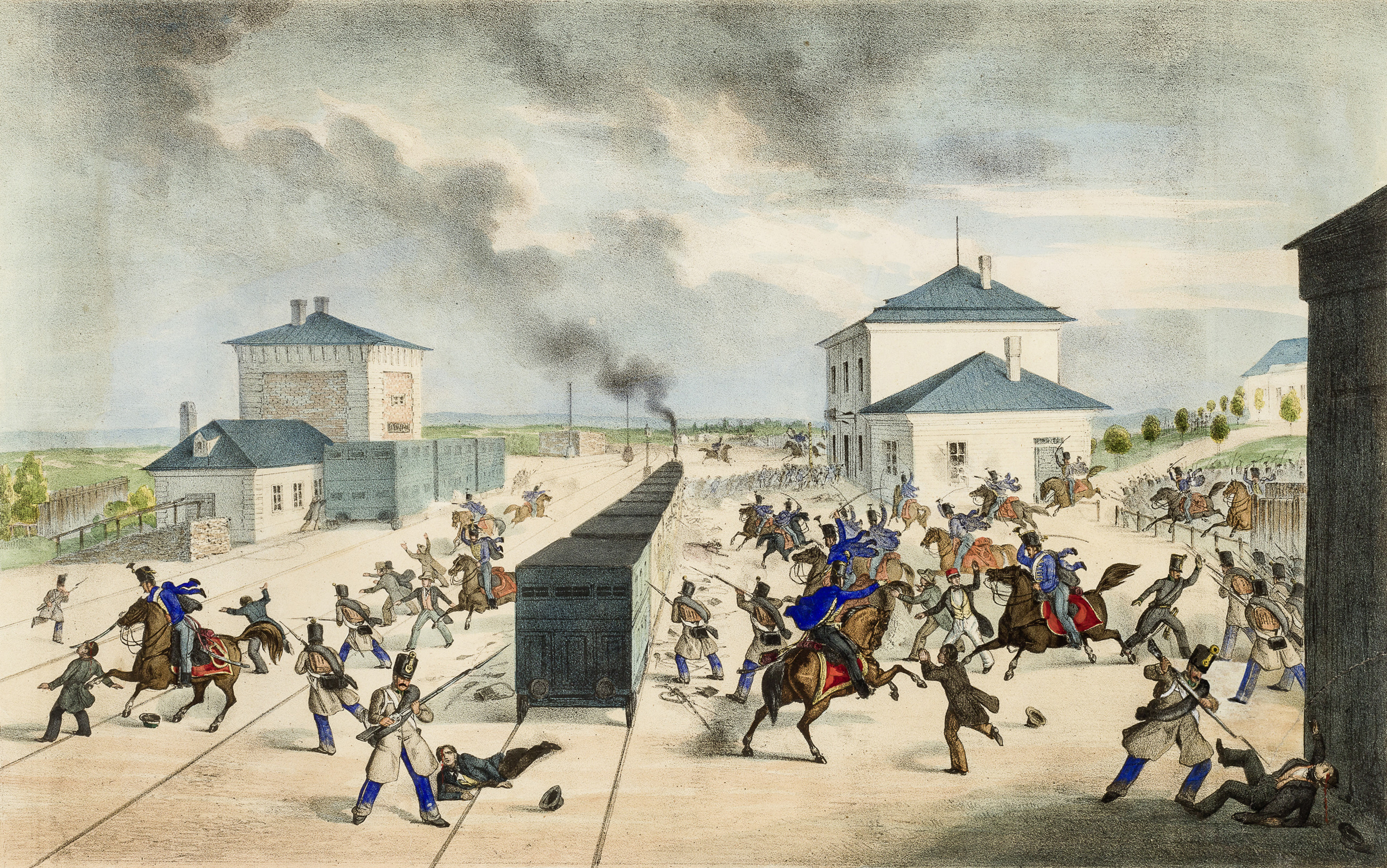
Illustration of the rebels and the army at the scene of the massacre

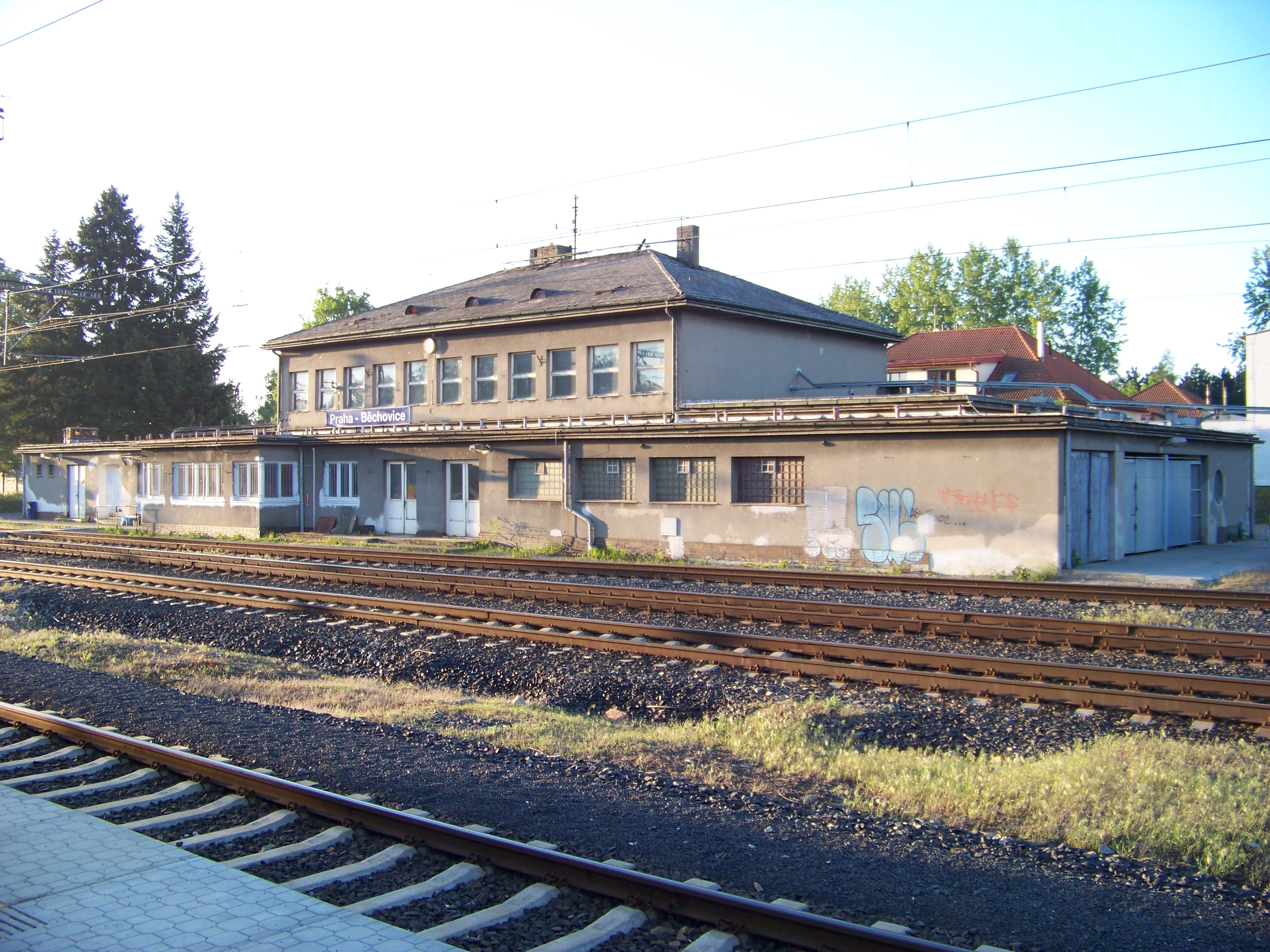
Praha-Běchovice station today

The Massacre in Běchovice occurred on 17 June 1848 at the train station in the village of Běchovice near Prague (now part of the city), in Bohemia (now the Czech Republic).

In the revolutionary year 1848, many of Prague's bourgeoisie decided to flee the city. Many of them fled by train. In those times, there was only one railway line that connected Prague with Vienna, by way of Česká Třebová and Olomouc, and Běchovice was the first station beyond Prague.

Because of its location, General Windisch-Grätz chose Běchovice as a main centre for searches for rebels. Windischgraetz and his army searched each train, but they were not able to find any guns or rebels. Soon after 6 a.m., a train arrived full of students fleeing from Prague. It is not known what exactly happened. There was probably a minor skirmish between one of the passengers and some soldiers, but it grew to a massacre. Hussars attacked the train and slaughtered everyone on sight. Everyone was ordered to stay on the train, but the hussars pulled people out and killed them. Some of the passengers, mainly women and children, fled to the nearby train station building although it was under heavy fire.

The exact number of those killed is not known, but there were over 100 heavily wounded passengers.
