= Klánovice =

Municipal district in Prague, Czechia

Klánovice Klánovice
- Municipal District of Prague; Cadastral Area of Prague
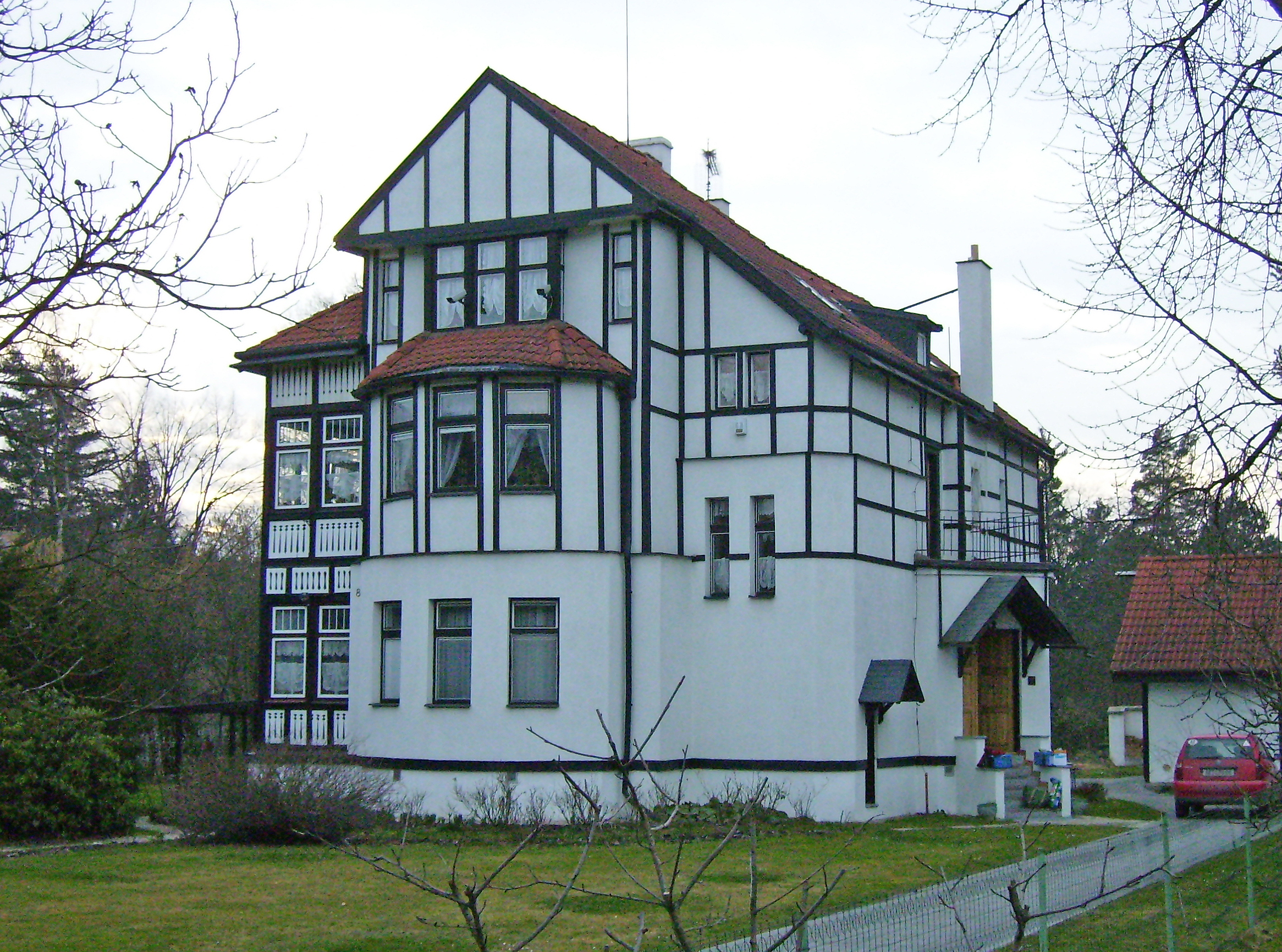
- Historical house in Klánovice

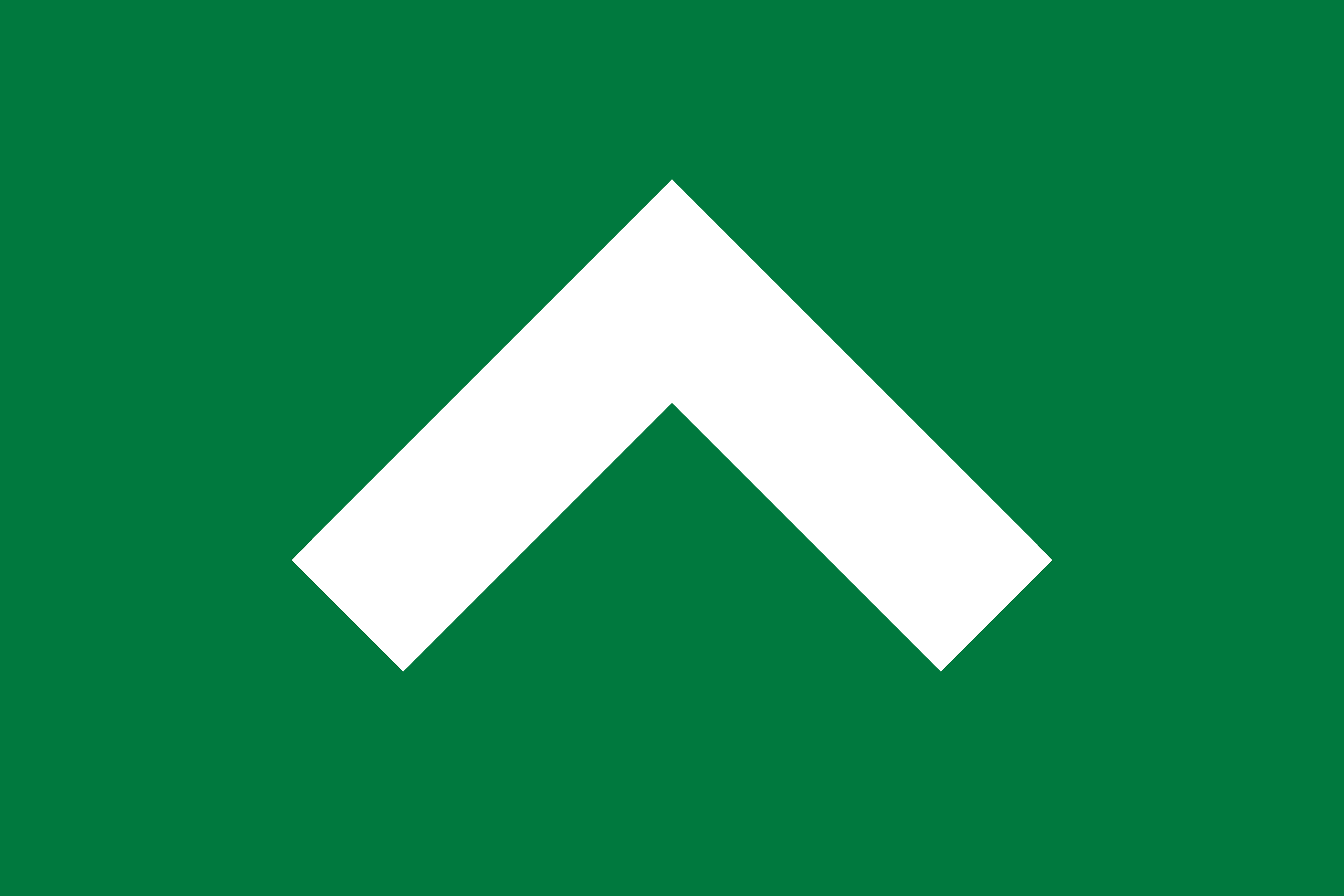
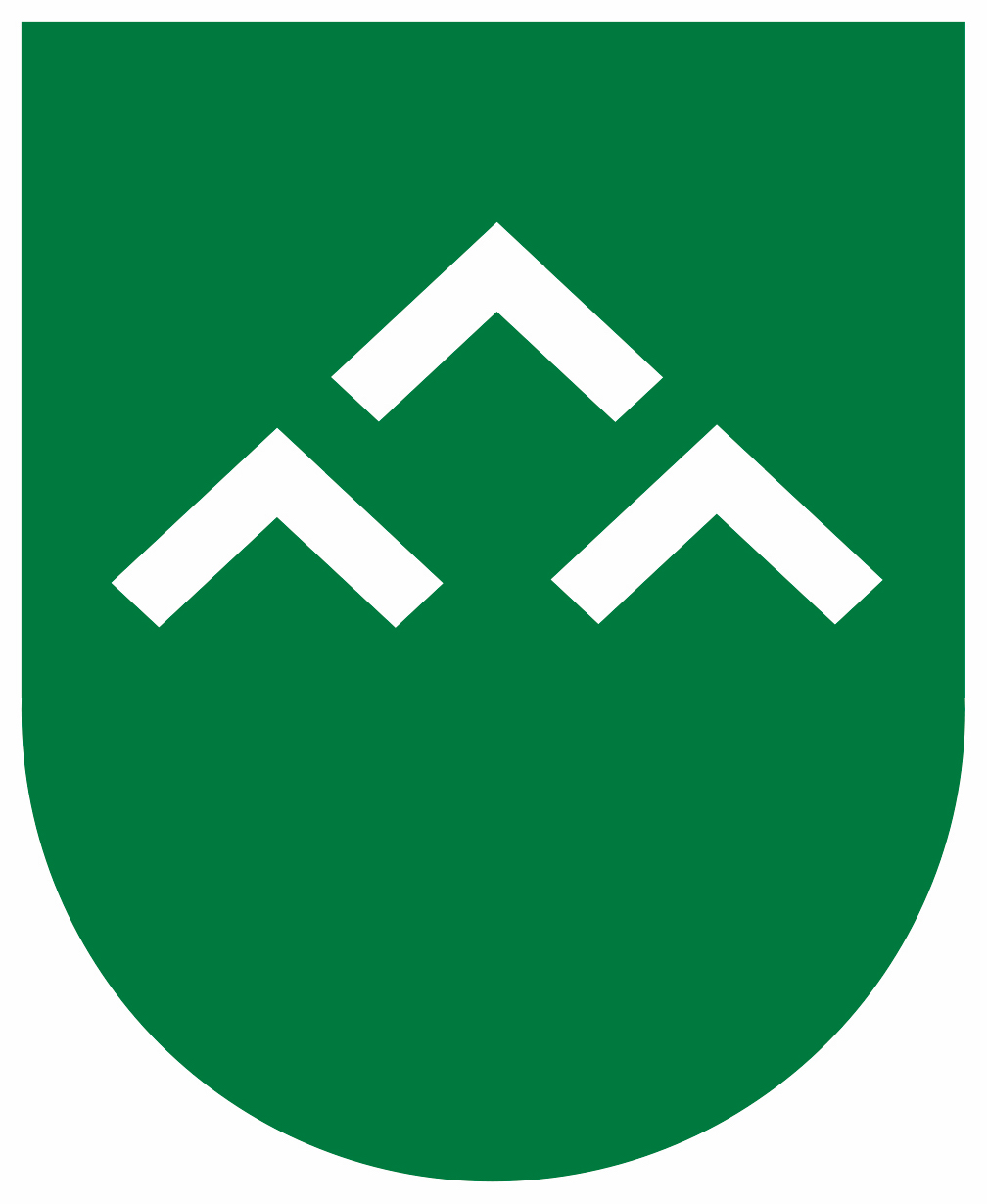
- Flag Coat of arms

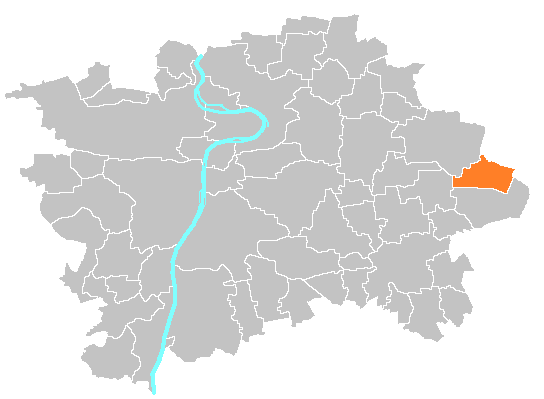
- Location of Klánovice in Prague
- Coordinates: 50°5′39″N 14°40′10″E
- Country: Czech Republic
- Region: Prague
- District: Prague 21

Government
  - Mayor: Alena Kolovrátková

Area
  - Total: 5.89 km^{2} (2.27 sq mi)

Population (2021)
  - Total: 3,511
  - Density: 596/km^{2} (1,540/sq mi)
- Time zone: UTC+1 (CET)
  - Summer (DST): UTC+2 (CEST)
- Postal code: 190 14
- Website: Official website

Klánovice (German: Klanowitz) is a municipal district (městská část) and cadastral area (katastrální území) in Prague, Czechia. Originally a village (since 1878), later a municipality (since 1920), it became a district of Prague in 1974.

It is located at the eastern limit of the city and borders Prague 20 (Horní Počernice) in the northwest, Běchovice, in the west, Újezd nad Lesy in the southwest, and south and Prague-East District (municipality of Šestajovice) in the northeast.

== Transport ==
This city is served by the Praha-Klánovice railway station, on the way from Praha hlavní nádraží to Kolín.

== Demographics ==
Historical population
Year	Pop.	±%
1880	15	—
1890	21	+40.0%
1900	52	+147.6%
1910	99	+90.4%
1921	429	+333.3%
1930	633	+47.6%
1950	1,687	+166.5%
1961	2,201	+30.5%
1970	2,116	−3.9%
1980	2,390	+12.9%
1991	2,339	−2.1%
2001	2,578	+10.2%
2011	3,272	+26.9%
2021	3,511	+7.3%
Source: Censuses

== See also ==
- Klánovice Forest
- Praha-Klánovice railway station
