= Prague 15 =

Prague 15 Praha 15
- Municipal District of Prague; Administrative District of Prague
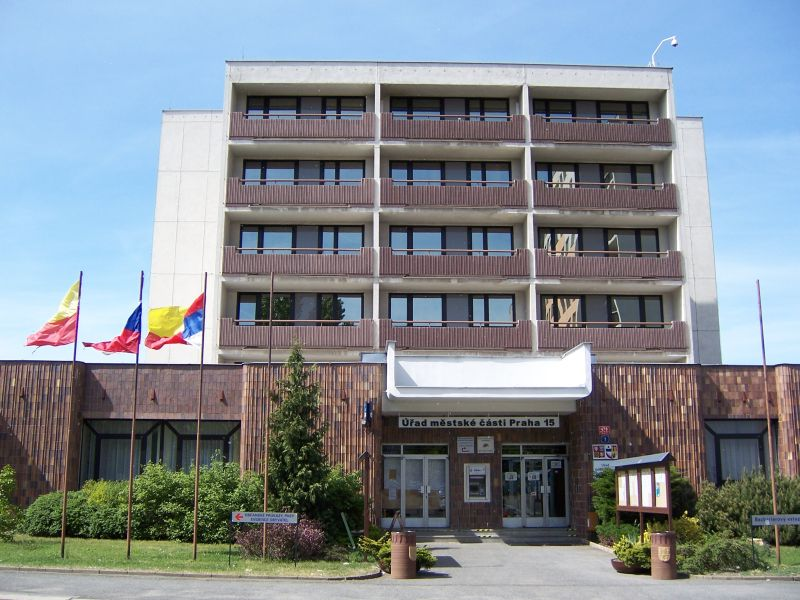
- Town hall of Prague 15 (Horní Měcholupy)

- Flag Coat of arms

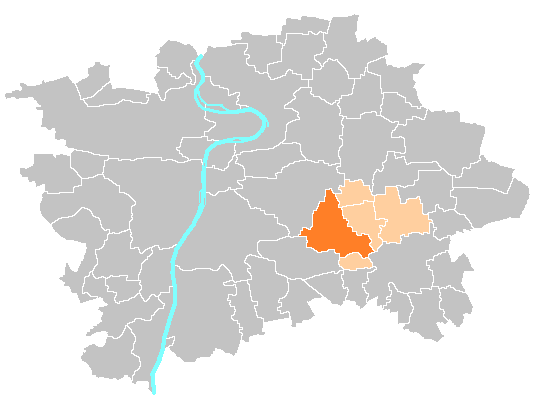
- Location of Prague 15 in Prague
- Coordinates: 50°2′48″N 14°33′24″E
- Country: Czech Republic
- Region: Prague

Government
  - Mayor: Michal Fišer

Area
  - Total: 10.24 km^{2} (3.95 sq mi)

Population (2021)
  - Total: 35,167
  - Density: 3,434/km^{2} (8,895/sq mi)
- Time zone: UTC+1 (CET)
  - Summer (DST): UTC+2 (CEST)
- Postal code: 102 00, 109 00
- Website: http://www.praha15.cz

Prague 15 is a municipal district (městská část) in Prague, Czech Republic. It is located in the south eastern part.

The administrative district (správní obvod) of the same name comprises municipal districts Prague 15, Horní Měcholupy, Dolní Měcholupy, Dubeč, Petrovice and Štěrboholy.

== Demographics ==
Historical population
Year	Pop.	±%
1869	1,109	—
1880	1,274	+14.9%
1890	1,529	+20.0%
1900	1,809	+18.3%
1910	2,520	+39.3%
1921	3,375	+33.9%
1930	5,541	+64.2%
1950	6,552	+18.2%
1961	6,740	+2.9%
1970	6,917	+2.6%
1980	12,547	+81.4%
1991	27,454	+118.8%
2001	27,410	−0.2%
2011	31,296	+14.2%
2021	35,167	+12.4%
Source: Censuses

== Twin towns / sister cities ==
- Harlow, United Kingdom (de jure district)
- Žilina, Slovakia

== See also ==
- Districts of Prague § Symbols
