= Horní Měcholupy =

- Cadastral Area of Prague
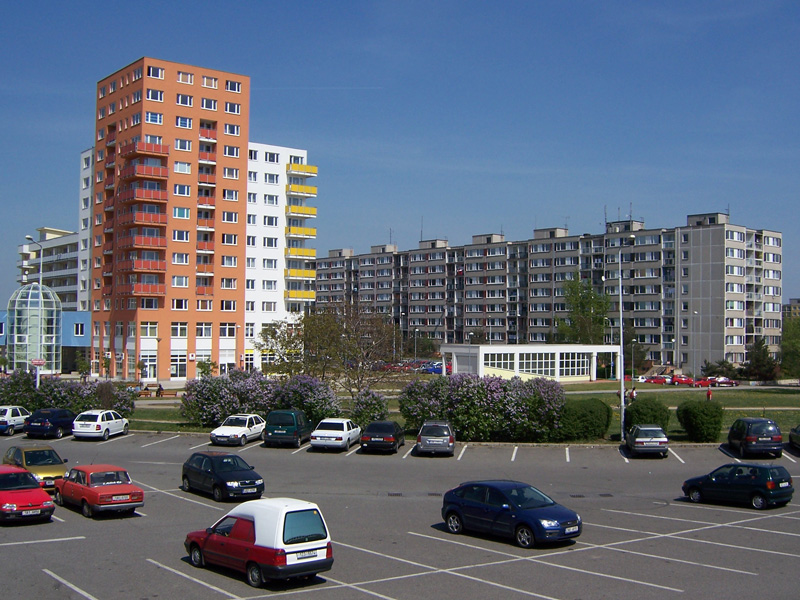
- Veronské náměstí (Verona Square) in Horní Měcholupy

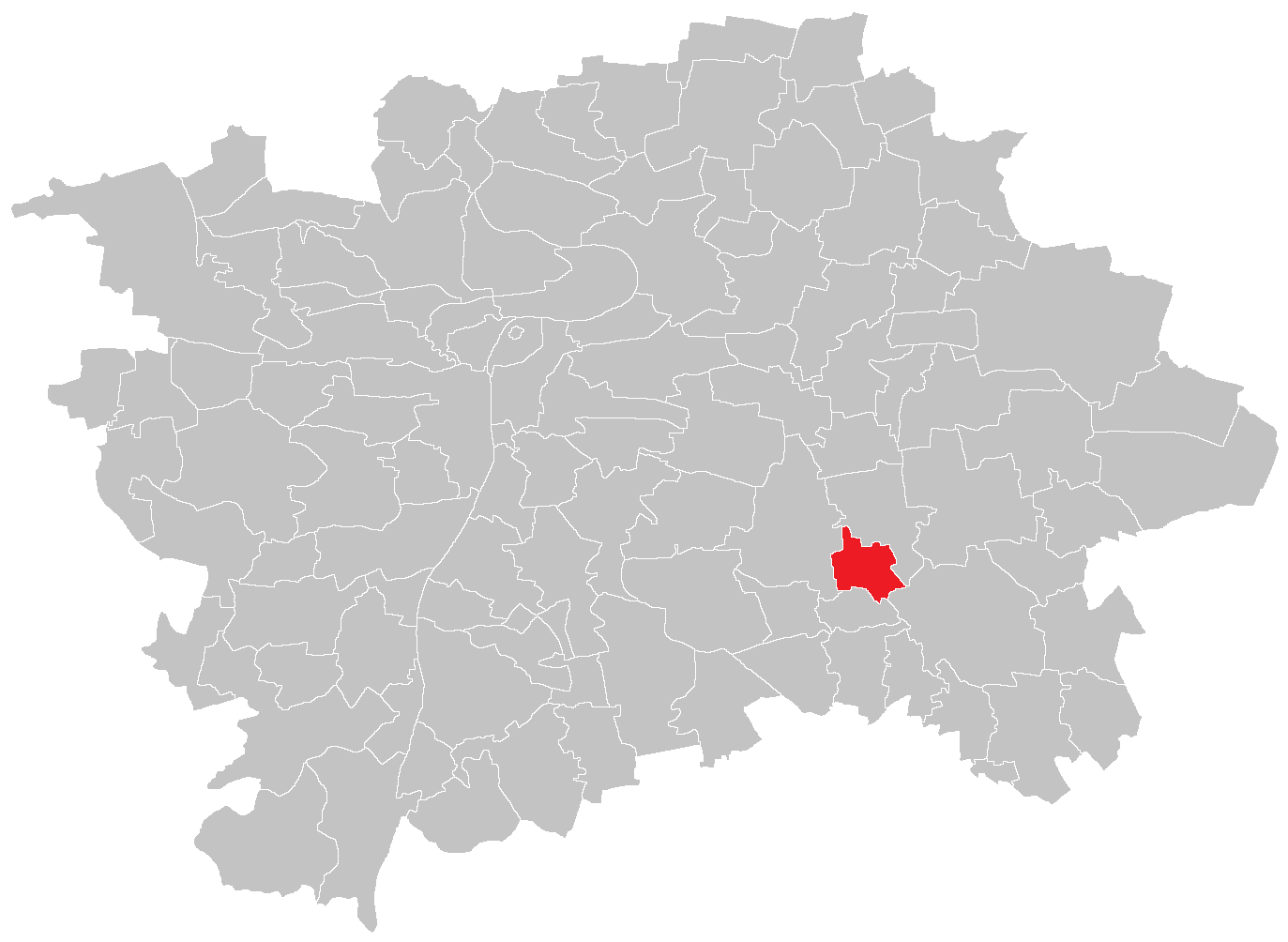
- Location of Horní Měcholupy in Prague
- Coordinates: 50°2′43″N 14°33′27″E
- Country: Czech Republic
- Region: Prague
- District: Prague 15

Area
  - Total: 2.25 km^{2} (0.87 sq mi)

Population (2021)
  - Total: 16,006
  - Density: 7,110/km^{2} (18,400/sq mi)
- Time zone: UTC+1 (CET)
  - Summer (DST): UTC+2 (CEST)
- Postal code: 109 00

Horní Měcholupy (German: Ober Miecholup) is a cadastral area in Prague.

== Demographics ==
Historical population

Year	Pop.	±%
1869	152	—
1880	209	+37.5%
1890	201	−3.8%
1900	213	+6.0%
1910	244	+14.6%

Year	Pop.	±%
1921	237	−2.9%
1930	454	+91.6%
1950	542	+19.4%
1961	742	+36.9%
1970	982	+32.3%

Year	Pop.	±%
1980	795	−19.0%
1991	10,095	+1169.8%
2001	12,012	+19.0%
2011	12,993	+8.2%
2021	16,006	+23.2%

Source: Censuses
