= Předslav =

- Municipality
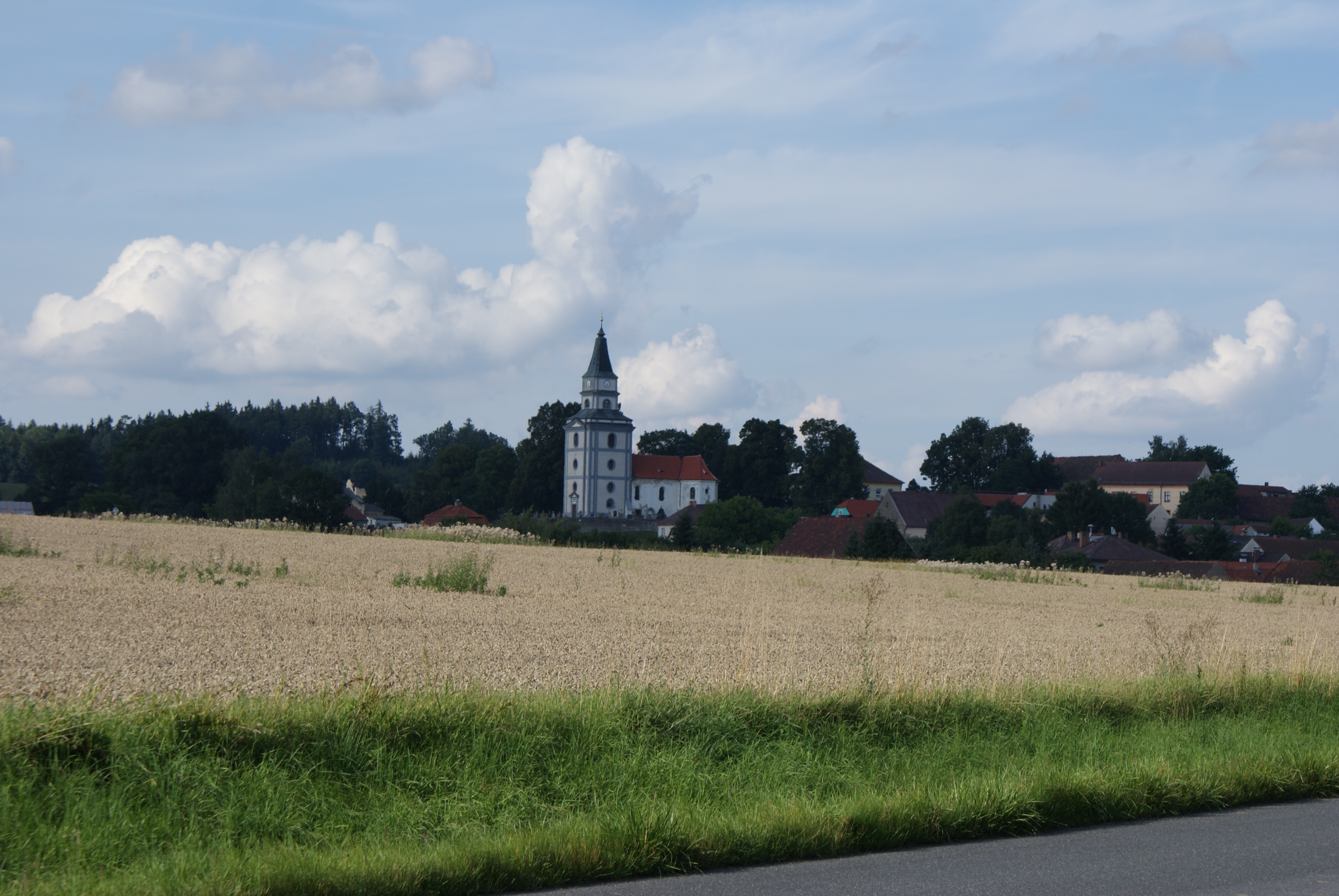
- General view

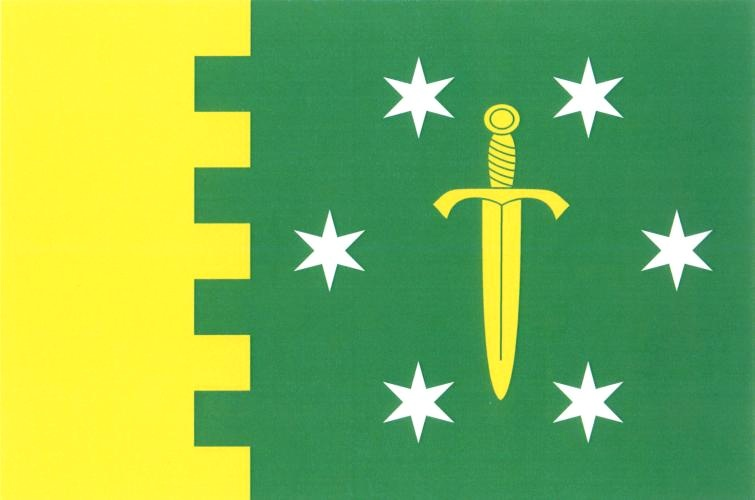
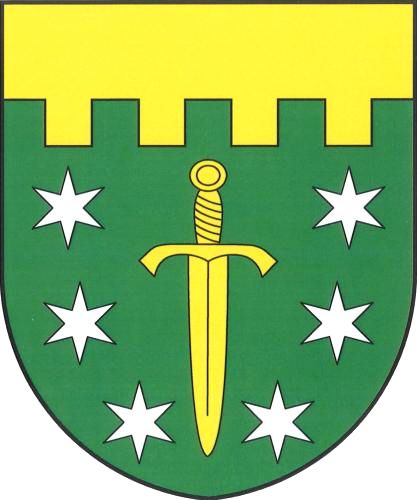
- Flag Coat of arms

- Location in the Czech Republic
- Coordinates: 49°26′51″N 13°21′16″E
- Country: Czech Republic
- Region: Plzeň
- District: Klatovy
- First mentioned: 1352

Area
  - Total: 19.60 km^{2} (7.57 sq mi)
- Elevation: 420 m (1,380 ft)

Population (2026-01-01)
  - Total: 829
  - Density: 42.3/km^{2} (110/sq mi)
- Time zone: UTC+1 (CET)
  - Summer (DST): UTC+2 (CEST)
- Postal codes: 339 01
- Website: www.predslav.cz

Předslav is a municipality and village in Klatovy District in the Plzeň Region of the Czech Republic. It has about 800 inhabitants.

Předslav lies approximately 8 kilometres (5 mi) north-east of Klatovy, 34 km (21 mi) south of Plzeň, and 105 km (65 mi) south-west of Prague.

== Administrative division ==
Předslav consists of seven municipal parts (in brackets population according to the 2021 census):

- Předslav (316)
- Hůrka (11)
- Makov (112)
- Měcholupy (155)
- Němčice (118)
- Petrovičky (73)
- Třebíšov (21)

== Demographics ==
Historical population
Year	Pop.	±%
1869	1,831	—
1880	2,000	+9.2%
1890	1,918	−4.1%
1900	1,811	−5.6%
1910	1,735	−4.2%
1921	1,783	+2.8%
1930	1,511	−15.3%
1950	1,134	−25.0%
1961	1,179	+4.0%
1970	990	−16.0%
1980	900	−9.1%
1991	763	−15.2%
2001	698	−8.5%
2011	731	+4.7%
2021	806	+10.3%
Source: Censuses
