= Prague 21 =

Prague 21 Praha 21
- Municipal District of Prague; Administrative District of Prague
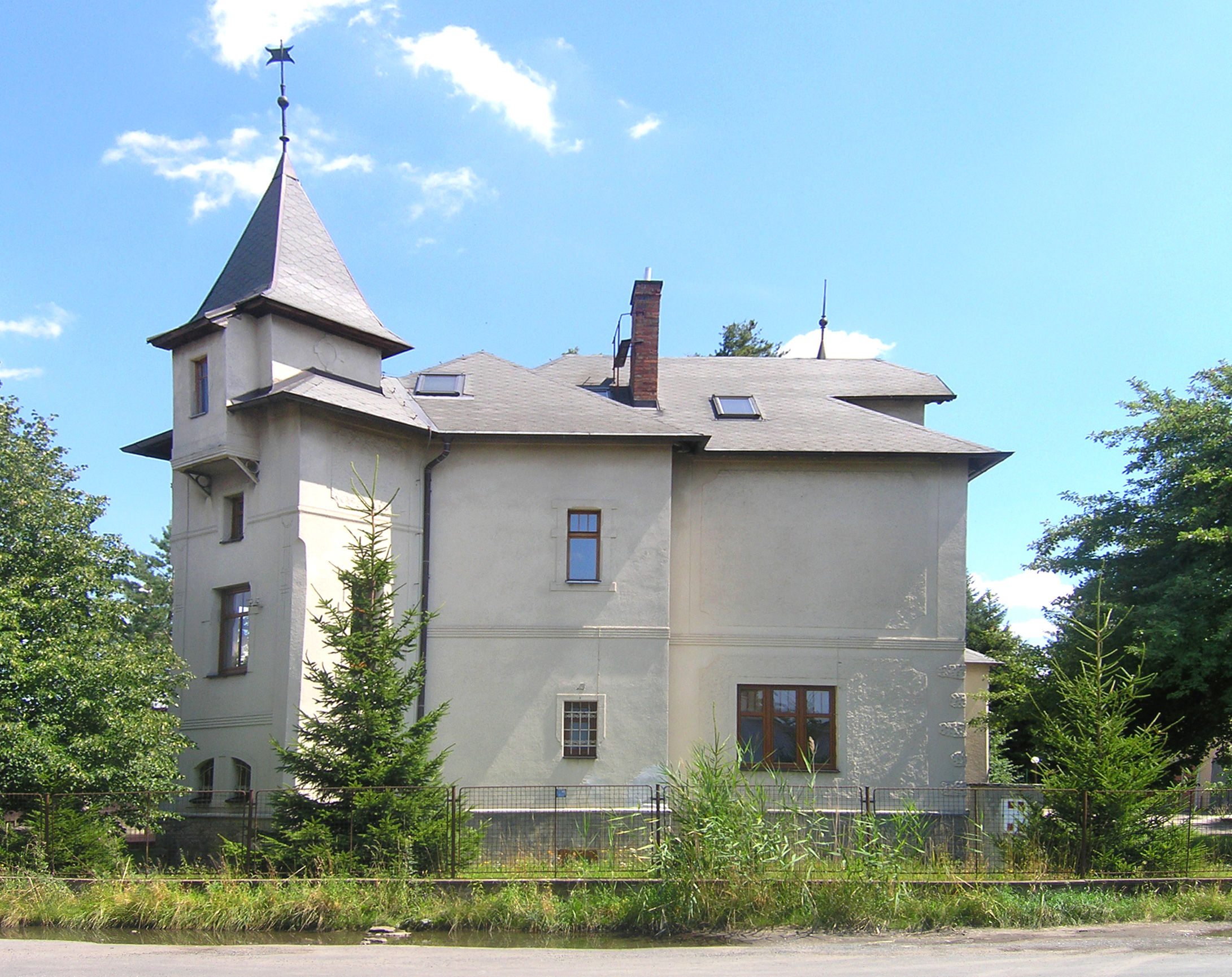
- Villa in Prague 21

- Flag Coat of arms

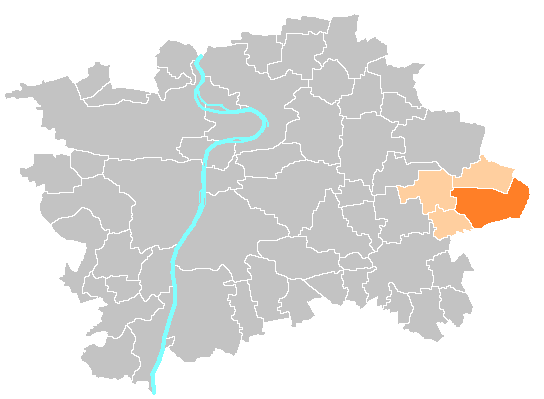
- Location of Prague 21 in Prague
- Coordinates: 50°4′33″N 14°39′34″E
- Country: Czech Republic
- Region: Prague

Government
  - Mayor: Milan Samec

Area
  - Total: 10.15 km^{2} (3.92 sq mi)

Population (2021)
  - Total: 10,429
  - Density: 1,027/km^{2} (2,661/sq mi)
- Time zone: UTC+1 (CET)
  - Summer (DST): UTC+2 (CEST)
- Postal code: 190 16
- Website: http://www.praha21.cz

Prague 21, also known as Újezd nad Lesy, is municipal district (městská část) in Prague, Czech Republic. It is located in the eastern part of the city. It has 10,429 inhabitants as of 2021.

The administrative district (správní obvod) of the same name consists of municipal district Prague 21, Běchovice, Klánovice and Koloděje.

== Demographics ==
Historical population
Year	Pop.	±%
1869	335	—
1880	339	+1.2%
1890	317	−6.5%
1900	314	−0.9%
1910	339	+8.0%
1921	539	+59.0%
1930	2,755	+411.1%
1950	3,444	+25.0%
1961	3,538	+2.7%
1970	3,350	−5.3%
1980	3,512	+4.8%
1991	6,147	+75.0%
2001	7,116	+15.8%
2011	10,352	+45.5%
2021	10,429	+0.7%
Source: Censuses
