= Petrovice (Prague) =

Prague-Petrovice Praha-Petrovice
- Municipal District of Prague
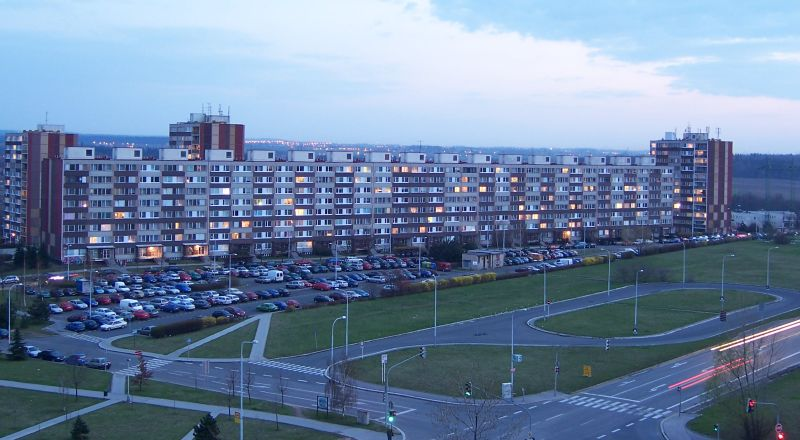
- Dobrá Voda housing estate

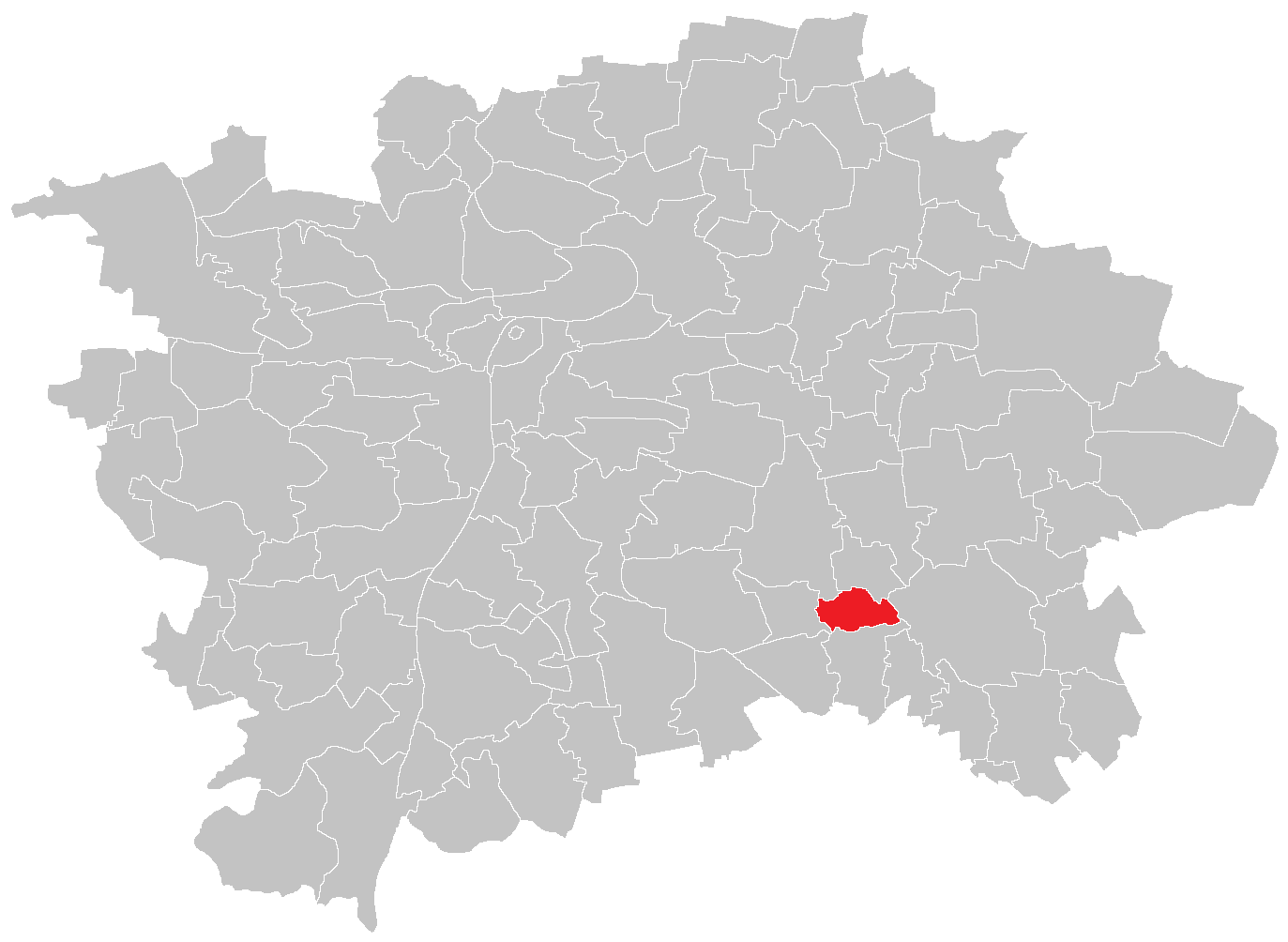
- Location of Petrovice in Prague
- Coordinates: 50°02′06″N 14°33′31″E
- Country: Czech Republic
- Region: Prague
- District: Prague 15

Area
  - Total: 1.79 km^{2} (0.69 sq mi)

Population (2021)
  - Total: 5,753
  - Density: 3,210/km^{2} (8,320/sq mi)
- Time zone: UTC+1 (CET)
  - Summer (DST): UTC+2 (CEST)
- Postal code: 109 00

Prague-Petrovice (German: Petrowitz) is a municipal district of Prague, Czech Republic. Petrovice is located in the southeastern part of the city. Petrovice is an independent municipality with its own city hall and city assembly. It is part of the Prague 15 administrative district. It has about 5,700 inhabitants. Petrovice used to be a village founded in the 13th century, while today it is an integrated part of Prague. There is a chateau here as well.

== Demographics ==
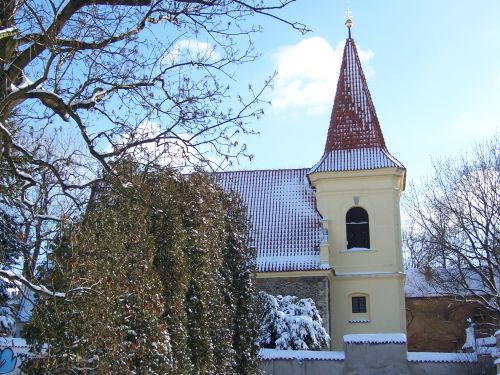
Church of St. Jacob Senior

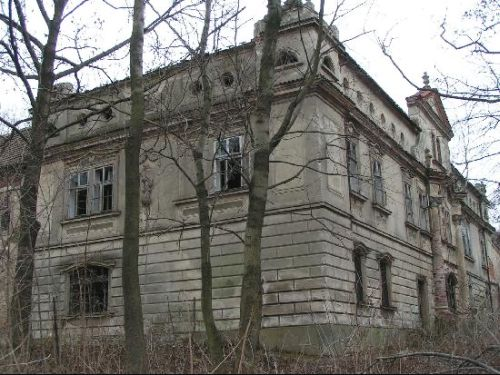
Castle in Petrovice

Historical population

Year	Pop.	±%
1869	292	—
1880	341	+16.8%
1890	338	−0.9%
1900	413	+22.2%
1910	442	+7.0%
1921	401	−9.3%
1930	759	+89.3%
1950	595	−21.6%

Year	Pop.	±%
1961	715	+20.2%
1970	742	+3.8%
1980	831	+12.0%
1991	5,305	+538.4%
2001	5,990	+12.9%
2011	6,126	+2.3%
2021	5,753	−6.1%

Source: Censuses
