= Dubeč =

Dubeč Dubeč
- Municipal District of Prague; Cadastral Area of Prague
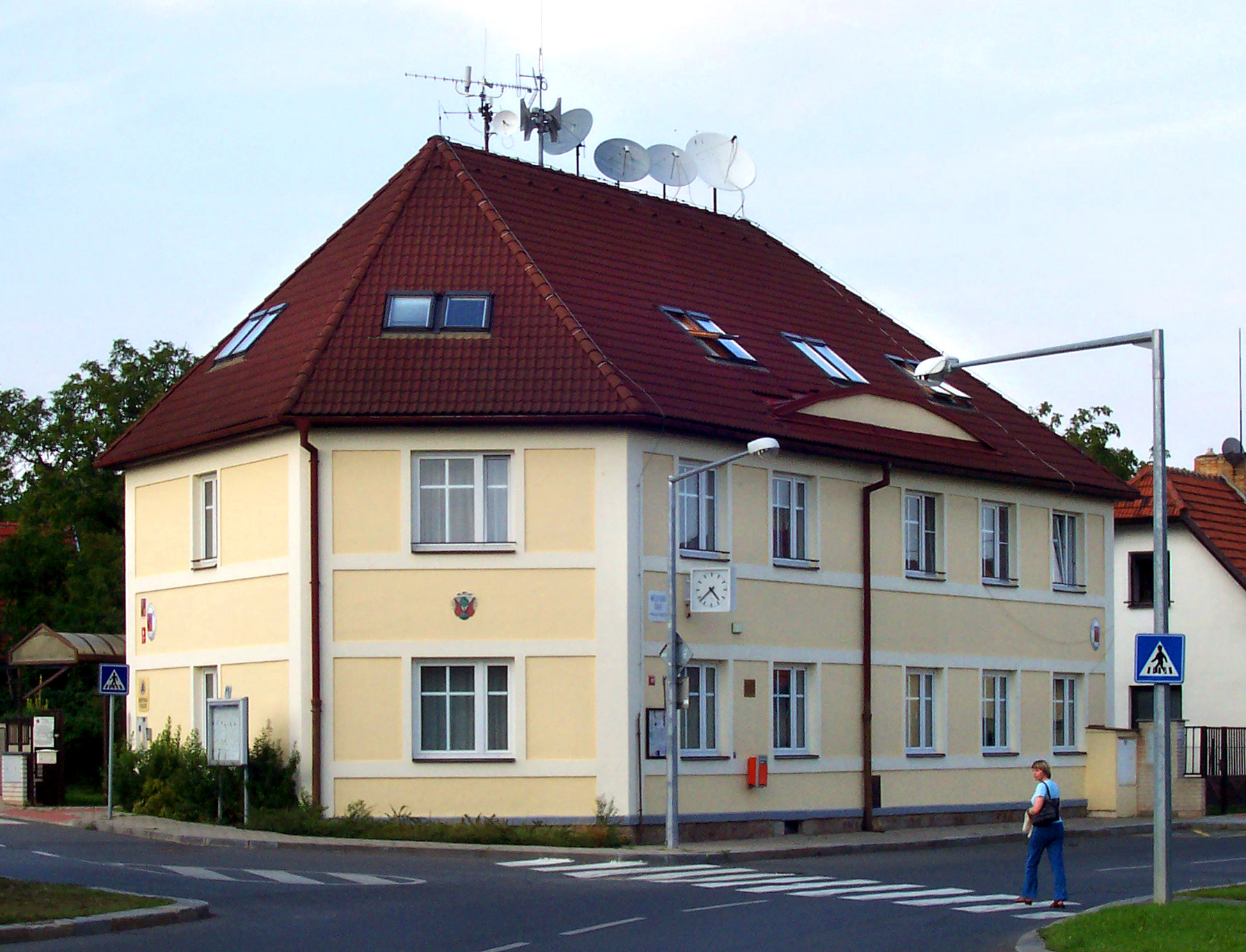
- Dubeč town hall

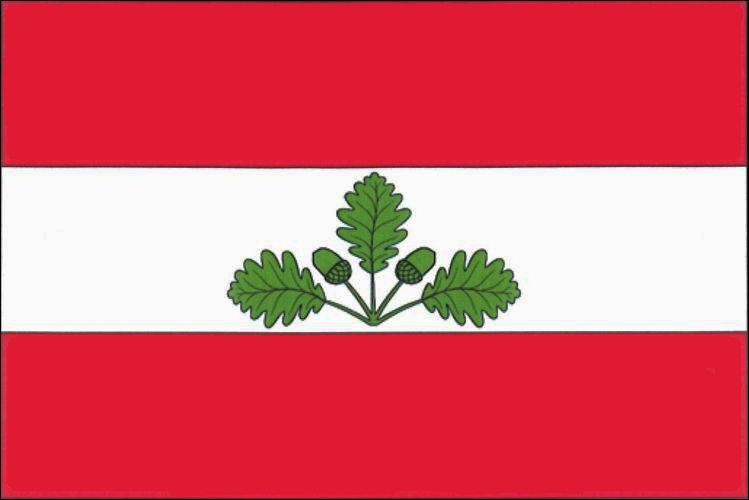
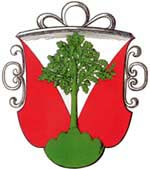
- Flag Coat of arms

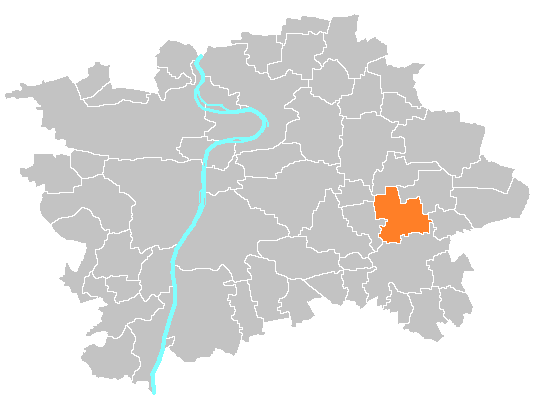
- Location of Dubeč in Prague
- Coordinates: 50°3′42″N 14°35′26″E
- Country: Czech Republic
- Region: Prague
- District: Prague 15

Government
  - Mayor: Jaroslav Tošil

Area
  - Total: 8.60 km^{2} (3.32 sq mi)

Population (2021)
  - Total: 4,175
  - Density: 485/km^{2} (1,260/sq mi)
- Time zone: UTC+1 (CET)
  - Summer (DST): UTC+2 (CEST)
- Postal code: 107 00
- Website: http://www.praha-dubec.cz

Dubeč is a municipal district (městská část) and cadastral area (katastrální území) in Prague. It is located in the eastern part of the city. As of 2021, there were 4,175 inhabitants living in Dubeč.

The first written record of Dubeč is from the 11th century. The village became part of Prague in 1974.

== Demographics ==
Historical population
Year	Pop.	±%
1869	801	—
1880	946	+18.1%
1890	945	−0.1%
1900	929	−1.7%
1910	1,021	+9.9%
1921	976	−4.4%
1930	2,410	+146.9%
1950	2,388	−0.9%
1961	1,794	−24.9%
1970	1,782	−0.7%
1980	1,797	+0.8%
1991	1,843	+2.6%
2001	1,997	+8.4%
2011	3,487	+74.6%
2021	4,175	+19.7%
Source: Censuses
