= Měcholupy (Plzeň-South District) =

- Municipality
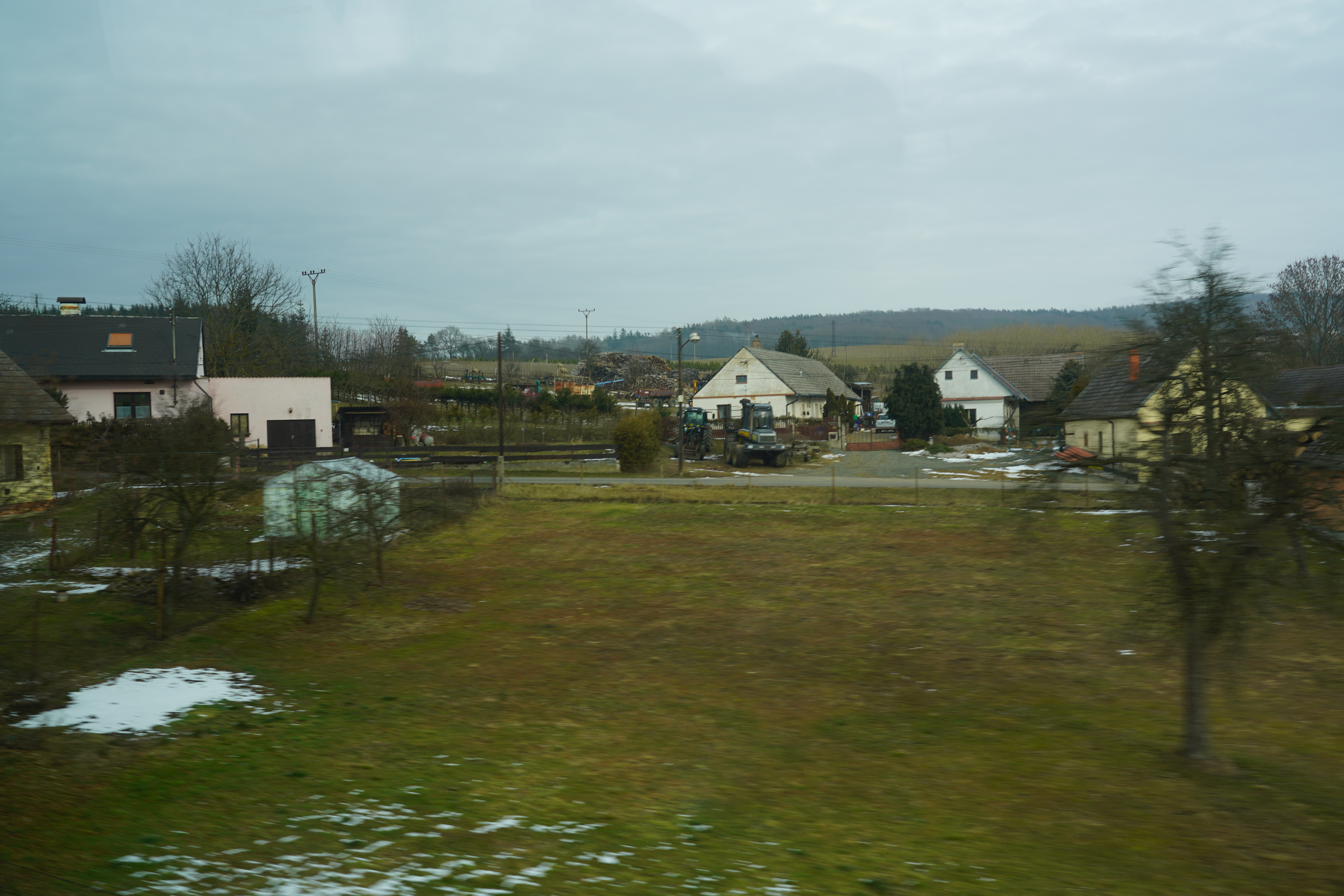
- Houses in Měcholupy

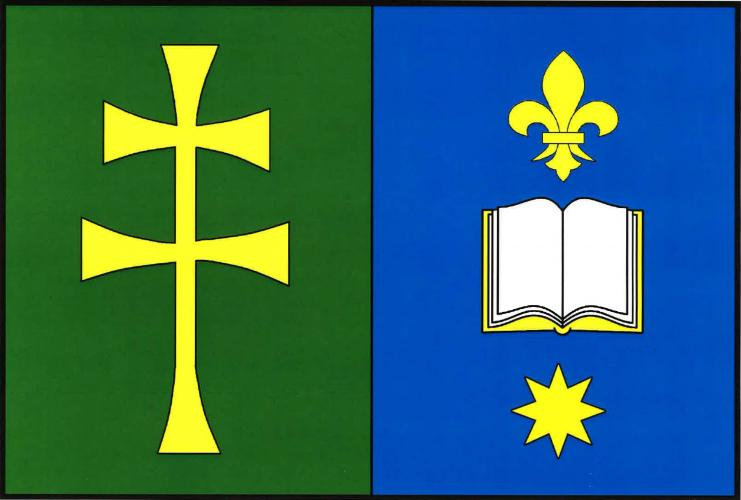
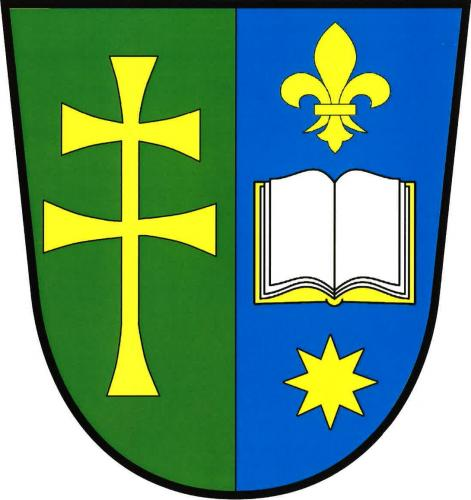
- Flag Coat of arms

- Location in the Czech Republic
- Coordinates: 49°31′10″N 13°31′58″E
- Country: Czech Republic
- Region: Plzeň
- District: Plzeň-South
- First mentioned: 1558

Area
  - Total: 12.91 km^{2} (4.98 sq mi)
- Elevation: 505 m (1,657 ft)

Population (2026-01-01)
  - Total: 206
  - Density: 16.0/km^{2} (41.3/sq mi)
- Time zone: UTC+1 (CET)
  - Summer (DST): UTC+2 (CEST)
- Postal code: 335 51
- Website: www.mecholupyublovic.cz

Měcholupy is a municipality and village in Plzeň-South District in the Plzeň Region of the Czech Republic. It has about 200 inhabitants.

== Etymology ==
The Old Czech word měcholup was derived from měch ('money bag') and lupič ('robber'), and referred to a type of robbers. Měcholupy was initially a settlement of such robbers.

== Geography ==
Měcholupy is located about 26 kilometres (16 mi) south of Plzeň. It lies in the Švihov Highlands. The highest point is the hill Buková hora at 651 m (2,136 ft) above sea level.

== History ==
The first written mention of Měcholupy is from 1558.

== Demographics ==
Historical population

Year	Pop.	±%
1869	457	—
1880	495	+8.3%
1890	516	+4.2%
1900	521	+1.0%
1910	492	−5.6%

Year	Pop.	±%
1921	494	+0.4%
1930	467	−5.5%
1950	415	−11.1%
1961	358	−13.7%
1970	302	−15.6%

Year	Pop.	±%
1980	259	−14.2%
1991	204	−21.2%
2001	197	−3.4%
2011	191	−3.0%
2021	219	+14.7%

Source: Censuses

== Transport ==
The I/20 road (part of the European route E49) from Plzeň to České Budějovice runs through the municipality.

The railway line Plzeň–Nepomuk crosses the eastern part of the municipality, but there is no train station.

== Sights ==
Among the protected cultural monuments in the municipality are two archaeological sites; one on the site of a Middle Eneolithic settlement and one on the site of a former medieval village.

The main cultural landmark of Měcholupy is the Chapel of Saints Cyril and Methodius. It was built in 1905.
