= Běchovice =

- Municipal District of Prague; Cadastral Area of Prague
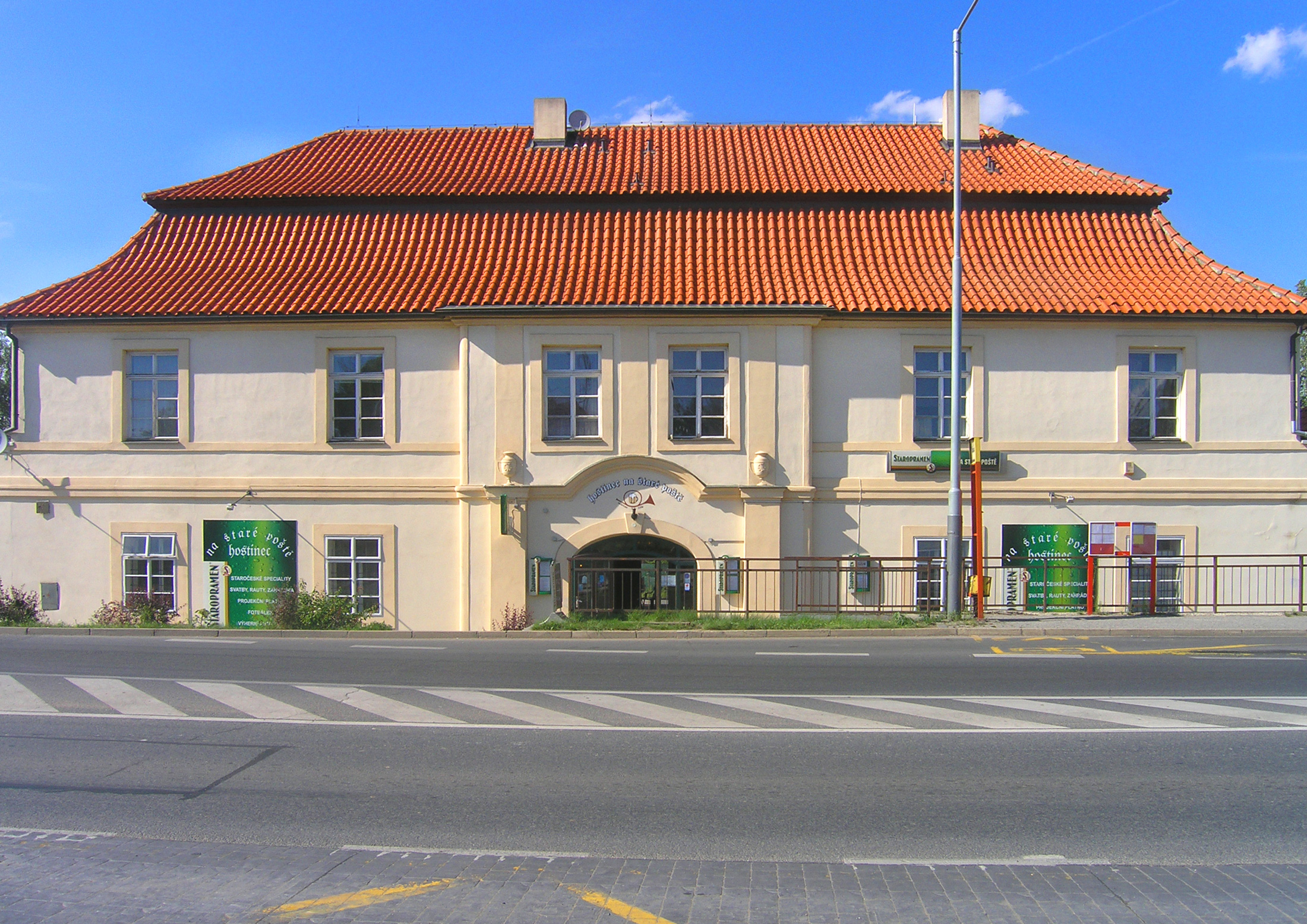
- former Tour pub in Běchovice

- Flag Coat of arms

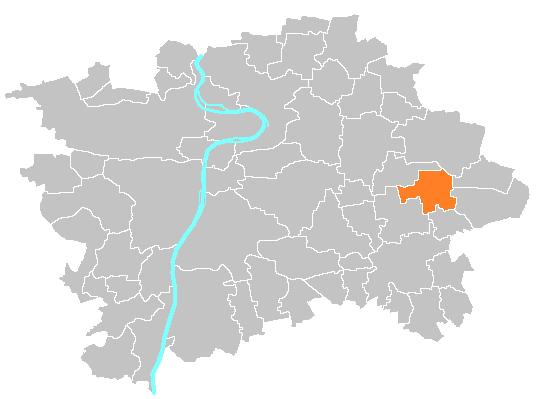
- Location of Běchovice in Prague
- Coordinates: 50°4′56″N 14°37′7″E
- Country: Czech Republic
- Region: Prague

Government
  - Mayor: Ondřej Martan

Area
  - Total: 6.83 km^{2} (2.64 sq mi)

Population (2021)
  - Total: 2,414
  - Density: 353/km^{2} (915/sq mi)
- Time zone: UTC+1 (CET)
  - Summer (DST): UTC+2 (CEST)
- Postal code: 190 11
- Website: https://www.praha-bechovice.cz/

Běchovice (Czech pronunciation: [ˈbjɛxovɪtsɛ]) is a suburb of Prague, currently a municipal district in the administrative district Prague 21. It is located about 13 km east of the city centre. The main road and railway line connecting Prague and Kolín pass through Běchovice. The population as of 2008 was 4,038.

First mentioned in 1228 in possession of St. George's Convent at Prague Castle, the village was incorporated into Prague in 1974.

Běchovice railway station was the site of Massacre in Běchovice which happened on 17 June 1848.

Today the location is domestically known mainly for the Běchovice – Prague Race, a mass attended 10 km run whose course follows the road from Běchovice towards Prague. It has been held in early autumn each year without interruption since 1897.

== Demographics ==
Historical population
Year	Pop.	±%
1869	558	—
1880	596	+6.8%
1890	524	−12.1%
1900	578	+10.3%
1910	713	+23.4%
1921	787	+10.4%
1930	1,250	+58.8%
1950	974	−22.1%
1961	1,883	+93.3%
1970	1,869	−0.7%
1980	1,822	−2.5%
1991	1,605	−11.9%
2001	1,538	−4.2%
2011	2,866	+86.3%
2021	2,414	−15.8%
Source: Censuses
