= Dolní Měcholupy =

Dolní Měcholupy Dolní Měcholupy
- Municipal District of Prague; Cadastral Area of Prague
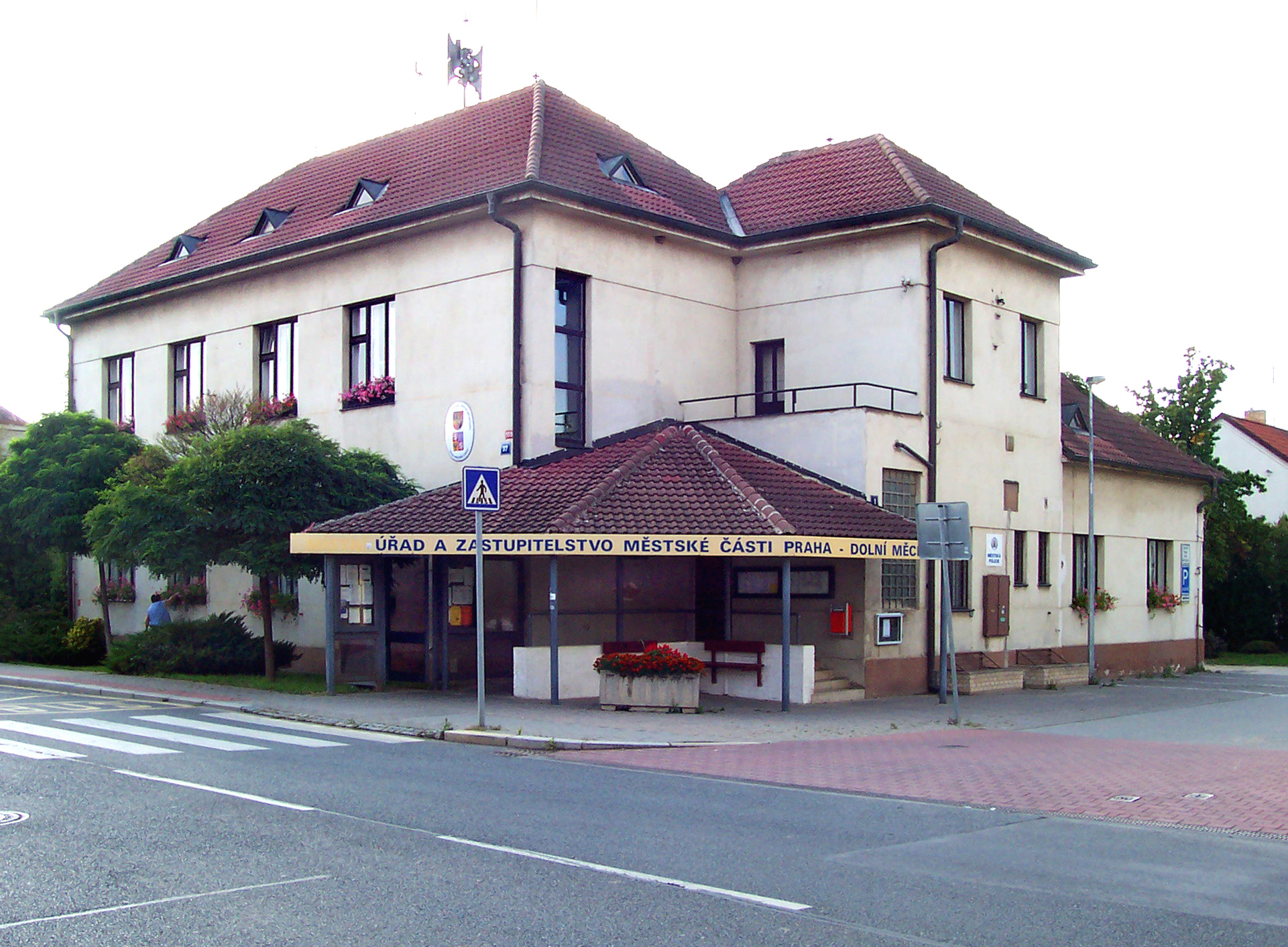
- Dolní Měcholupy town hall

- Flag Coat of arms

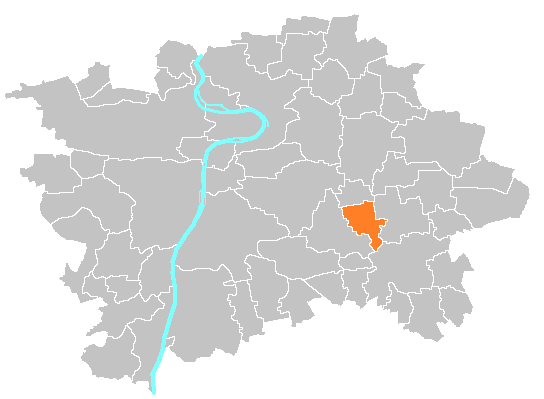
- Location of Dolní Měcholupy in Prague
- Coordinates: 50°3′32″N 14°33′31″E
- Country: Czech Republic
- Region: Prague
- District: Prague 15

Government
  - Mayor: Jiří Jindřich

Area
  - Total: 4.66 km^{2} (1.80 sq mi)

Population (2021)
  - Total: 4,132
  - Density: 887/km^{2} (2,300/sq mi)
- Time zone: UTC+1 (CET)
  - Summer (DST): UTC+2 (CEST)
- Postal code: 109 00
- Website: http://www.dolnimecholupy.cz

Dolní Měcholupy is a municipal district (městská část) and cadastral area (katastrální území) in Prague. It is located in the eastern part of the city. As of 2021, there were 4,132 inhabitants living in Dolní Měcholupy.

The first written record of Dolní Měcholupy is from the 14th century. The village became part of Prague in 1968.

== Demographics ==
Historical population
Year	Pop.	±%
1869	193	—
1880	302	+56.5%
1890	353	+16.9%
1900	330	−6.5%
1910	435	+31.8%
1921	476	+9.4%
1930	1,035	+117.4%
1950	1,162	+12.3%
1961	1,271	+9.4%
1970	1,264	−0.6%
1980	1,074	−15.0%
1991	1,013	−5.7%
2001	1,154	+13.9%
2011	2,527	+119.0%
2021	4,132	+63.5%
Source: Censuses
