= Štěrboholy =

Coordinates: 50.073°N 14.553°E

- Municipal District & Cadastral Area of Prague
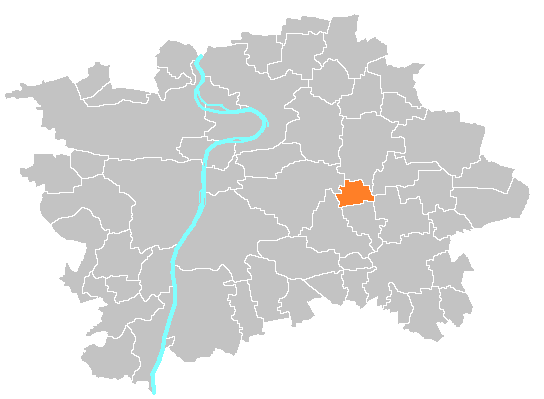
- Štěrboholy on a map of Prague
- Country: Czechia
- Municipality: Prague

Area
  - Total: 2.97 km^{2} (1.15 sq mi)

Population
  - Total: 1,705
  - Density: 574/km^{2} (1,490/sq mi)

The Czech village of Štěrboholy was founded in 1371, and became part of Prague in 1968. Now it is its own cadastral area, part of the administrative district Prague 10.

Its area is 2.97 km^{2}, its population is 2,464 and its population density is 829 inhabitants/km^{2}.

Šterboholy became known during the Seven Years' War on 6 May 1757. That day was the Battle of Prague, where Frederick II the Great defeated the Austrian troops of Charles Alexander of Lorraine.

== Demographics ==
Historical population
Year	Pop.	±%
1869	231	—
1880	233	+0.9%
1890	204	−12.4%
1900	219	+7.4%
1910	330	+50.7%
1921	386	+17.0%
1930	643	+66.6%
1950	765	+19.0%
1961	755	−1.3%
1970	715	−5.3%
1980	784	+9.7%
1991	799	+1.9%
2001	940	+17.6%
2011	2,205	+134.6%
2021	2,464	+11.7%
Source: Censuses
