= List of movie theater chains =

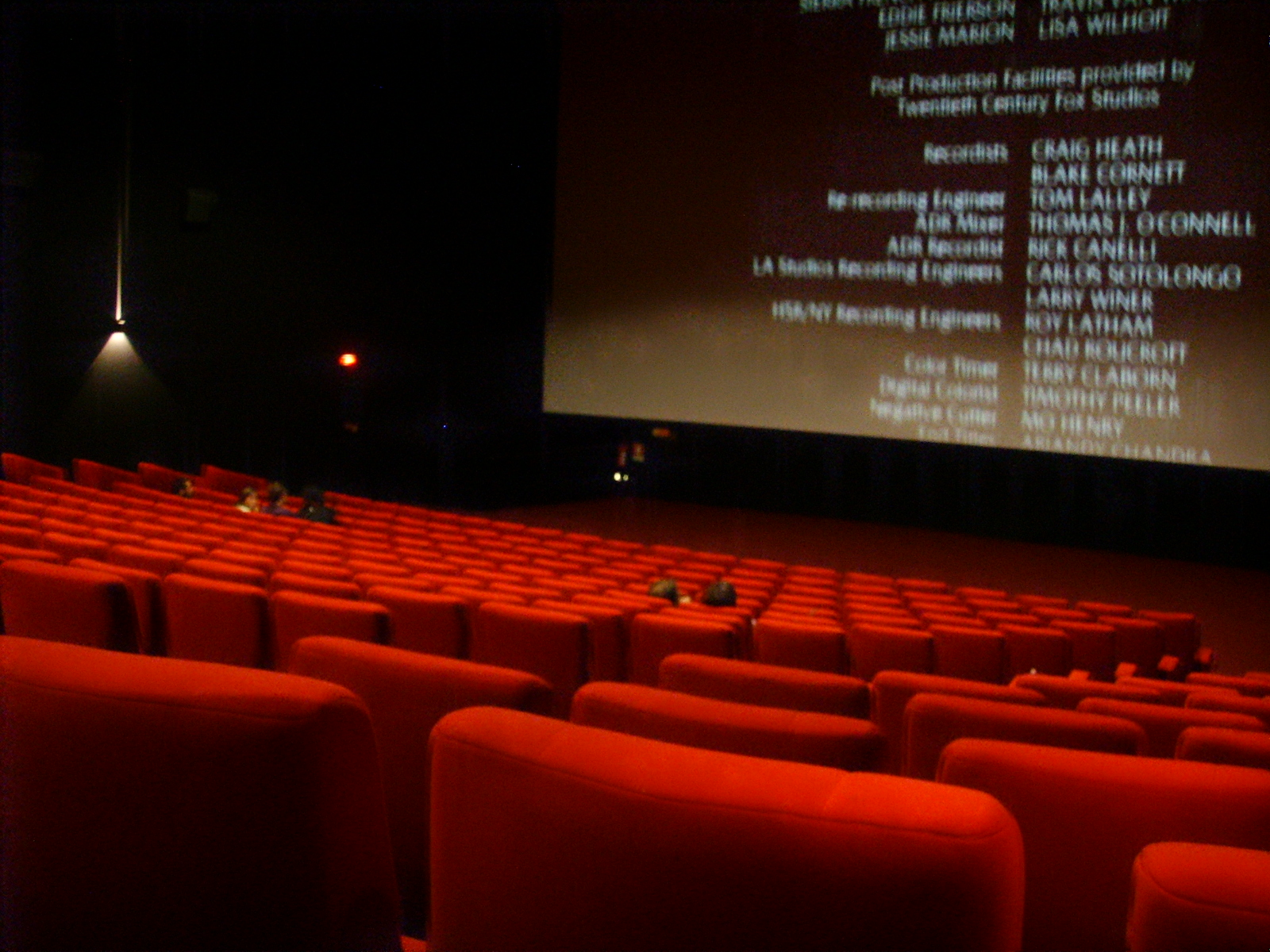
A screening of Shrek the Third at the Vispathè cinema, in Campi Bisenzio, Italy

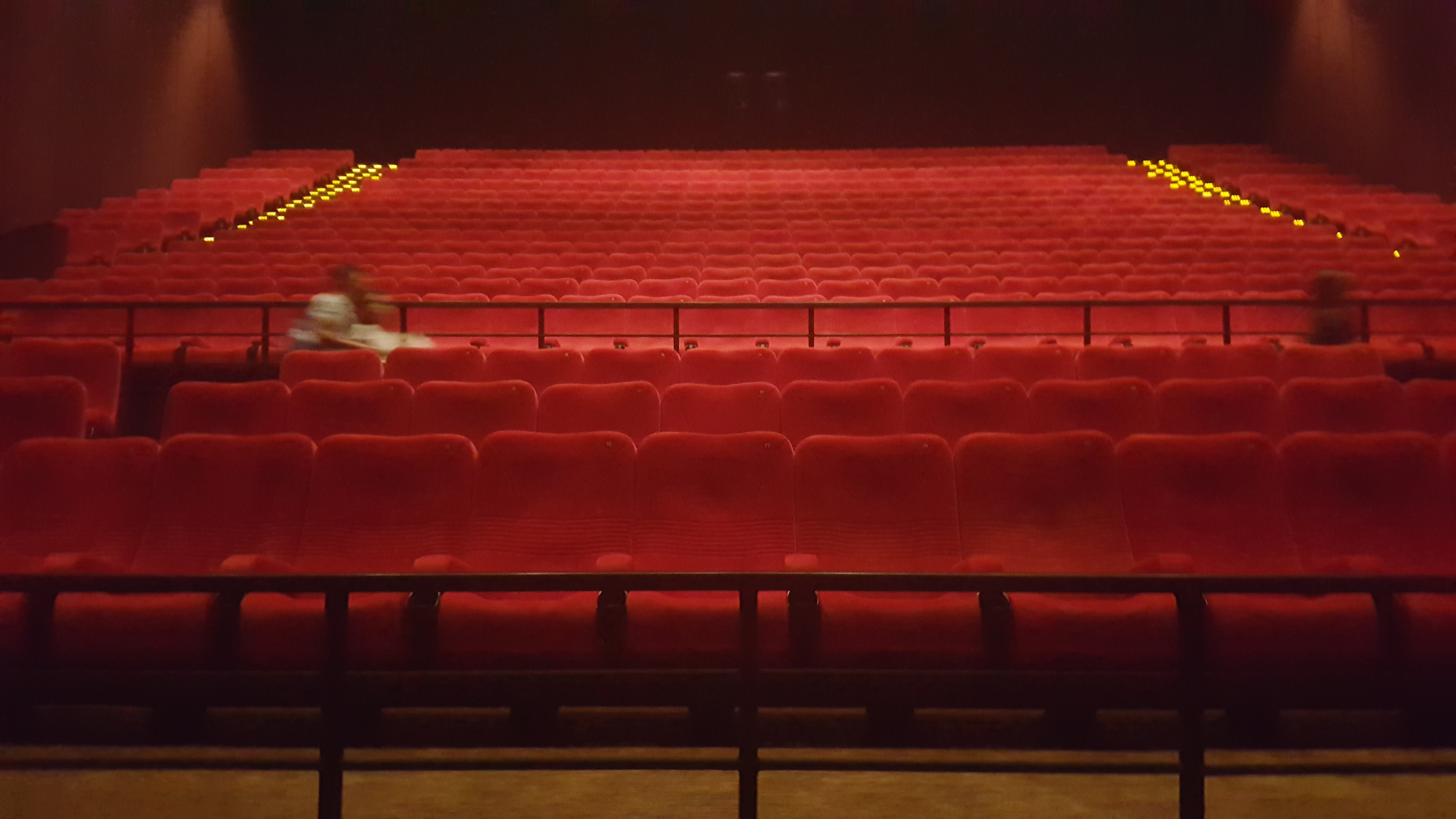
IMAX at Gading XXI, North Jakarta (second largest IMAX in Indonesia)

This is a list of movie theater chains across the world. The chains of movie theaters are listed alphabetically by continent and then by country.

== Global cinema and movie theater chains ==
The following are the world's largest movie theater chains:

#	Chain	HQ	Screens	Sites
1	AMC	United States	10,474	940
2	Cineworld	United Kingdom	8,188	672
3	Cinépolis	Mexico	6,836	891
4	Cinemark	United States	5,647	497
5	CGV	South Korea	3,459	463
6	Cinemex	Mexico	2,861	332
7	Cineplex	Canada	1,676	164
8	PVR INOX	India	1,711	359
9	Vue	United Kingdom	1,989	228
10	Wanda	China	1,657	187

== Africa ==
=== Egypt ===
- VOX Cinemas

=== Ghana ===
- Silverbird Cinemas

=== Nigeria ===
- Silverbird Cinemas – As at 2022, the largest cinema chain in West Africa in-terms of screen numbers, operating with 65 screens. It has 10 theatres in three countries; Ghana, Liberia, Nigeria.

=== South Africa ===
- Ster-Kinekor – operating throughout South Africa, it has the largest market share with 53 locations
- Nu Metro Cinemas – 17 locations in South Africa
- Cinecentre — 5 branches across South Africa

== Americas ==
=== Argentina ===
- Atlas Cines
- Cinemark Hoyts
- Cinépolis
- Showcase Cinemas (with IMAX theater)

=== Bolivia ===
- Cine Center (Caribbean Cinemas)
- Cinemark

=== Brazil ===
- Cine Araújo
- Cinemais
- Cinemark Theatres
- Cinépolis
- Cinesystem Cinemas
- Kinoplex
- Moviecom
- UCI Cinemas

=== Canada ===
- Alliance Cinemas – after selling its BC locations, it operated one theater in Toronto until 2021 which has since been rebranded as a Cineplex.
- Cinémas Guzzo – 10 locations and 142 screens in the Montreal area
- Cineplex Cinemas – Canada's largest and North America's fifth-largest movie theater company, with 162 locations and 1,635 screens
  - Cinema City – discount chain in Western Canada, purchased by Cineplex
  - Cineplex Odeon Cinemas – operations in both Canada and the United States. Operations in each country is owned by separate companies. Cineplex Cinemas in Canada and AMC Theatres in the United States.
  - Colossus (theatre) – a Famous Players brand, now owned by Cineplex
  - Famous Players – formerly Canada's largest theatre chain; purchased by Cineplex Entertainment in 2005
  - Galaxy Cinemas – mid-sized chain that was the parent company to Cineplex Entertainment. Galaxy purchased bankrupt Cineplex in 2003.
  - Scotiabank Theatres – a Cineplex brand
  - SilverCity – a Famous Players brand, now owned by Cineplex
- Imagine Cinemas – 14 locations and 90 screens, in Ontario and BC.
- Landmark Cinemas – Canada's second-largest chain with 45 locations and 317 screens in British Columbia, Alberta, Saskatchewan, Manitoba, Ontario and the Yukon
- Rainbow and Magic Lantern Cinemas – 11 locations and 43 screens operating in Ontario, Alberta and Saskatchewan

==== Defunct brands in Canada ====
- AMC Theatres – as of July 2012 AMC divested of its Canadian operations, selling four to Cineplex, two to Empire Theatres which were later sold to Landmark Cinemas in 2013, closing two.
- Empire Theatres – closed on October 29, 2013, by selling most of their locations to Cineplex Entertainment and Landmark Cinemas and closing 3 others that were not included in the sales. It was formerly Canada's second-largest chain.
- Stinson Theatres

=== Chile ===
- Cineplanet
- Cinépolis Chile
- Cinemark

=== Colombia ===
- Cine Colombia
- Cinemark
- Cinépolis
- Royal Films
- Procinal
- Cineprox (Procinal)
- Cineland

=== Costa Rica ===
- Cinemark
- Cinépolis

=== Dominican Republic ===
- Caribbean Cinemas

=== Ecuador ===
- Multicines
- Supercines

=== El Salvador ===
- Cinemark
- Cinépolis
- Multicinema

=== Guatemala ===
- Cinemark
- Cinépolis

=== Mexico ===
- Cinépolis
- Cinemex
- Cinebox
- Cineplex (It is not related to the Cineplex of Canada)
- Cinedot

==== Defunct brands in Mexico ====
- Cinemark (bought by Cinemex)
- MMCinemas
- AMC Theatres – existed a short time since the early 90s in Plaza Satellite, Galerias Coapa, Perisur, Pericentro (naucalpan), and Pabellon Cuauhtemoc.
- General Cinema – had two theaters in Pavellon Polanco and Plaza Insurgentes
- Cinemagic – It was an independent cinema that was severely affected by the COVID-19 pandemic and had to declare bankruptcy.

=== Panama ===
- Cinemark
- Cinépolis
- Caribbean Cinemas

=== Paraguay ===
- Cines Itaú (owned by Cinesystem Cinemas)
- Cinemark

=== Peru ===
- Cinemark
- Cinépolis
- Cineplanet

=== Puerto Rico ===
- Caribbean Cinemas – 35 theaters, located in Puerto Rico and across the Caribbean, including Panama and Guyana

=== Trinidad and Tobago ===
- MovieTowne
- Caribbean Cinemas
- Digicel IMAX/CinemaOne

=== United States ===
Theatre Chain	Theatres Count	Screens Count	Headquarters	Markets	Parent Chain/Owner	Chains Acquired	Notes
Alamo Drafthouse Cinema	35	380	Austin, TX	Arizona, Texas, Colorado, Minnesota, Missouri, Nebraska, New York, North Carolina, California, Virginia, DC	Sony Pictures Experiences		
AMC Theatres	591	7,712	Leawood, KS	United States, Europe - Total of 16 countries		Carmike Cinemas; Kerasotes Theatres; Starplex Cinemas; Cinetopia in 2019	
Apple Cinemas	14	133	Walpole, MA	California, Connecticut, Maine, Massachusetts, New Hampshire, New York and Rhode Island			
B&B Theatres	51	508	Liberty, MO	Florida, Georgia, Iowa, Kansas, Minnesota, Mississippi, Missouri, Nebraska, Ohio, Oklahoma, South Carolina, Texas, Virginia, and Washington		Dickinson Theatres	
Brenden Theatres	7	91	Las Vegas, Nevada	Kingman, Arizona, Northern California, Rifle, Colorado, Las Vegas, Nevada			
Scene One Entertainment	38	232	Ridgefield, CT	Colorado, Connecticut, Maryland, New Jersey, New York, South Carolina, and Virginia		BTM Cinemas; Clearview Cinemas; Crown Theatres	
Boulevard Theatres	2	12	Wichita, KS	Kansas			
Cinépolis USA	28	264	Dallas, TX	California, Connecticut, Florida, Maryland, New Jersey, New York, Ohio, Texas	Cinépolis		
Cinema West	20	200	Petaluma, CA	California and Idaho			
Cinemark Theatres	304	4,249	Plano, TX	United States		Century Theatres Rave Cinemas	
CMX Cinemas	33	358	Miami, FL	United States, Mexico	Cinemex		
Classic Cinemas	15	121	Downers Grove, IL	Illinois, Wisconsin			
Emagine Theatres	28	352	Troy, MI	Michigan, Illinois, Minnesota, Indiana, Wisconsin, Colorado			
Fridley Family Theaters	17	99	Des Moines, IA	Iowa, Nebraska			
Galaxy Theatres	15	165	Monroe, WA	Arizona, California, Nevada, Texas, and Washington			
Georgia Theater Company	24	269	Saint Simons Island, GA	Florida, Georgia, North Carolina, South Carolina, Virginia			https://chamber.brunswickgoldenisleschamber.com/list/member/georgia-theatre-company-569, https://investors.imax.com/news-releases/news-release-details/georgia-theatre-company-and-imax-expand-partnership-five-new/, https://www.gtcmovies.com/
Golden Ticket Cinemas	26	193	Durham, NC	Arkansas, Georgia, Idaho, Illinois, Kentucky, Minnesota, Mississippi, Montana, Nebraska, North Carolina, North Dakota, Ohio, Oklahoma, Pennsylvania, South Dakota, Tennessee, West Virginia			
Goodrich Quality Theaters	30	281	Grand Rapids, MI	Michigan, Indiana, Illinois, Missouri, Florida			
Harkins Theatres	35	501	Scottsdale, AZ	Arizona, California, Colorado, Oklahoma			
Laemmle Theatres	9	44	Los Angeles, CA	Los Angeles, California			
Landmark Theatres	52	252	Los Angeles, CA	New York, Georgia, Maryland, Massachusetts, Illinois, Texas, Colorado, Michigan, Indiana, California, Florida, Wisconsin, Minnesota, Pennsylvania, Washington, Missouri, Washington D.C.			
Malco Theatres	35	362	Memphis, TN	Tennessee, Arkansas, Mississippi, Kentucky, Missouri, Louisiana			
Mann Theatres	8	67	Bloomington, MN	Minnesota			
Marcus Theatres	90	1,098	Milwaukee, WI	Arkansas, Colorado, Georgia, Kentucky, Louisiana, New York, Pennsylvania, Texas, Virginia, Wisconsin, Illinois, Iowa, Minnesota, Missouri, Nebraska, North Dakota, Ohio		Douglas Theatre Company Wehrenberg Theatres Movie Tavern	
Marquee Cinemas	17	175	Beckley, WV	Connecticut, Florida, Kentucky, North Carolina, New Jersey, New York, Tennessee, Virginia, West Virginia			
Maya Cinemas	6	88	Los Angeles, CA	California			
Megaplex Theatres	16	182	Sandy, UT	Utah, Nevada		Westates Theatres	
Metropolitan Theatres	11	62	Los Angeles, CA	California			
MJR Theatres	11	170	Bloomfield Hills, MI	Michigan			
Moore Theatres	5	27	Otsego, MI	Southwest Michigan			
National Amusements	29	392	Norwood, MA	Connecticut, Massachusetts, New Jersey, New York, Ohio, Rhode Island,		Cinema de Lux Multiplex Cinemas Showcase Cinemas	
NCG Cinemas	19	147	Owosso, MI	Florida, Georgia, Michigan, Indiana, Illinois, North Carolina, South Carolina, Tennessee			
Premiere Cinemas	28	301	Big Spring, TX	Alabama, Florida, Mississippi, New Mexico, South Carolina, Texas			
Reading Cinemas	27	245	Culver City, CA	Hawaii, California, New York, Texas, New Jersey, Virginia, Washington DC		Reading Cinemas (8 theatres) Angelika Film Center (6 theatres) Consolidated Theatres (9 theatres) Pacific Theatres (15 theatres)	
Regal Cinemas	393	5,386	Knoxville, TN	United States, American Samoa, Guam	Cineworld	Regal Cinemas (2002) United Artists Theatres (2002) Edwards Theatres (2002) Sawmill Theaters Hoyts Cinemas (2003 US locations) Eastern Federal Theatres (2005) Consolidated Theatres (2008) Great Escape Theatres (2012) Hollywood Theaters (2013; "Wallace Theaters") Warren Theatres (2017)	
Regency Theatres	18	131	Ventura, California	Southern California, Yuma, Arizona and Hawaii			
Santikos Theatres	27	377	San Antonio, TX	North Carolina, South Carolina, Georgia, Alabama, Florida, Mississippi, Louisiana, and Texas		Southern Theatres (2023) Grand Theatres AmStar Cinemas	For-profit company that exists solely to give back to non-profits
SR Entertainment	6	79	Santa Rosa, California	California			
Studio Movie Grill	30	330	Dallas, TX	Arizona, California, Florida, Georgia, Illinois, Indiana, North Carolina, Pennsylvania, Texas			

=== Venezuela ===
- Cinex
- Cines Unidos

== Asia ==
=== Bangladesh ===
- Star Cineplex

=== China ===
In 2014 there were 5,813 movie theaters in China and 299 cinema chains, with 252 classified as "rural" and 47 as "urban".

- Antaeus Cinema Line
- Bona Cinema Line
- China Film Group Digital Cinema Line
- China Film South Cinema Circuit
- China Film Stellar
- Cinemark
- CJ CGV
- Dadi Theater Circuit
- Hengdian Cinema Line
- Huayi Brothers Cinema Line
- Jinyi Cinemas
- UA Cinemas
- UME Cinemas
- Wanda Cinemas

==== Hong Kong ====
- Chinachem Cinema Circuit
- Orange Sky Golden Harvest

=== India ===
As of 2023, India has around 10,000 cinemas with over 30,000 screens. The growth in the number of screens has been driven by the expansion of multiplex chains like PVR INOX, Cinèpolis, and Miraj Cinemas. The Indian film industry continues to expand, with both regional and Bollywood films playing a significant role in this growth.

Theatre Chain	Number of Screens	Locations	Notes
PVR Cinemas (Part of PVR INOX)	1711 (Post Merger INOX)	359	Leading cinema operating chain of India with 1711 screens across 359 properties in 114 cities in India and Sri Lanka and more screens under development.; CineMAX – Multiplex chain with large presence in Mumbai, Kanpur & Kochi. Now owned by PVR.; DT Cinemas – Multiplex chain of the DLF group. Now owned by PVR.
INOX (Part of PVR INOX)	1711 (Post Merger PVR)	144	The existing properties owned by Inox prior to merger will continue to carry 'Inox' branding.; Fame Cinemas – Multiplex chain in Mumbai. Now owned by INOX.; Satyam Cineplex – Multiplex Chain in Delhi. Now owned by INOX.
Carnival Cinemas	470	115	Mumbai based multiplex chain, third largest in India with 341 screens in cities of Angamaly, Kollam, Mumbai, Delhi, Gurgaon, Kurukshetra, Jodhpur, Mangalore, Belgaum, Mumbai, Ahmedabad, Rajkot, Bengaluru, Goa, Trivandrum, Kozhikode, Thalassery, Thrissur, Kanpur, Lucknow, Hyderabad, Pune, Shimla, Sangli, Ghaziabad, Dehradun, Mussoorie, Varanasi, Prayagraj, Dindigul, Patan, Ongole, Vizianagaram, Chandrapur, Solapur, Nashik, Dhule, Nagpur, Khandwa, Indore, Raipur, Bhilai, Raigarh, Bilaspur, Korba, Salem, Coimbatore, Chennai, Jalandhar, Jaipur, Kolkata, Guwahati, Ranchi, Asansol, Kishangarh, Siliguri, Patna and Muzaffarpur; BIG Cinemas – Multiplex chain with 254 screens and a large presence all over India. Now owned by Carnival Cinemas.
Cinepolis India	360	35	Mexican multiplex chain with presence in Bhubaneswar, Jamshedpur, Bhopal, Gwalior, Indore, Coimbatore, Amritsar, Chandigarh, Kanpur, Bengaluru, Gurgaon, Noida, Kochi, Mangalore, Thane, Kota, Ahmedabad, Ludhiana, Surat, Patna, Delhi, Mumbai, Nagpur, Pune, Ghaziabad, Lucknow, Vadodara, Vijayawada, Hyderabad, Chennai, Kolkata, Guwahati, Kozhikode, Jaipur, Hubli and Muzaffarpur; Fun Cinemas – multiplex chain now owned by Cinepolis
Miraj Cinemas	162	56	Miraj Cinemas currently operating at 56 locations with 162 screens in India, across 14 States and 28 cities.
Chhotu Maharaj Cinema	118	118	Chhotu Maharaj Cinema - Indias Fastest Gowing Cinema Chain. 400+ Signed, 118 Install 35 Location Live across India.

- K Sera Sera Miniplex – K Sera Sera Limited multiplex chain with presence in Abohar, Hoshiarpur, Nawanshahr, Sangrur, Ramnagar, Ahmedabad, Mahad, Mumbai, Nagpur, Goa, and Durg
- SRS Cinemas – multiplex chain with presence in Faridabad, Gurgaon, Patiala, Ludhiana, Ranchi, Ghaziabad, Shimla, Bijnor, etc.
- PVS Film City – Multiplex chain based in Kerala with presence in five locations.
- MovieTime Cinemas – 35 screens in West and North India
- AGS cinemas – Multiplex chain with 4 properties and 18 screens in Chennai
- Mukta A2 Cinemas in Mumbai, Hyderabad, Ahmedabad, Dehradun, Kundli, Banswara, Gulbarga, Vizag, Vadodara, Sailu, Aurangabad
- Prasads Multiplex - One of the largest Multiplex with 6 screens in Hyderabad.
- AMB cinemas – Multiplex chain co-owned by Asian Cinemas & Actor Mahesh Babu with 2 properties and 14 screens in Hyderabad

=== Indonesia ===
- 21 Cineplex – largest cinema chain in Indonesia, owns around 64% of cinemas in Indonesia
- CGV Cinemas (previously as CGV blítz and blítzmegaplex) – chain owned by CJ CGV, owns around 17% of cinemas in Indonesia
- Cinépolis (previously as Cinemaxx) – chain owned by Lippo Group and Mexican movie theater Cinépolis, owns around 15% of cinemas in Indonesia (all Cinemaxx theaters were rebranded as Cinépolis since November 20th, 2019)

=== Japan ===
Chain	Screens	Notes
Aeon Cinemas	813	
Toho Cinemas	722	
Lawson United Cinemas	396	
Shochiku Movix	297	
Toei 109 Cinemas	175	
Toei/CJ CGV T-Joy Cinemas	142	
Cinema Sunshine	116	

=== Malaysia ===
- Golden Screen Cinemas
- TGV Cinemas
- MBO Cinemas (An announcement posted by MBO Cinemas on social media platforms on March 11, 2026, stating that it is closed permanently)
- Lotus Five Star (An announcement for LFS Cinemas has rebranded to FST Cinemas on 24 April 2026 effectively through their social media pages respectively.)

=== Nepal ===
- QFX Cinemas

=== Pakistan ===
- Atrium Cinemas
- Bambino Cinema
- Cine Gold
- CineStar
- DHA Cinema
- Nueplex Cinemas
- PAF Cinema
- Universe Cineplex

=== Philippines ===
- SM Cinemas
- Ayala Malls Cinemas
- Robinsons Movieworld
- Megaworld Cinemas
- Starmall Cinemas
- Gaisano Cinemas

=== Saudi Arabia ===
- AMC Theatres
- VOX Cinemas
- Muvi Cinemas
- Empire Cinemas

=== Singapore ===
- Cathay (also in Malaysia)
- Golden Village – a joint venture between Australia's Village Roadshow and Hong Kong's Golden Harvest in Singapore
- Shaw Organisation
- WE Cinemas

=== South Korea ===
- CJ CGV – largest multiplex cinema chain of Korea, with 1,201 screens worldwide and more than 100 million viewers worldwide
  - Cine de Chef – cinema and restaurant operated by CJ CGV
- Lotte Cinema – chain run by the Lotte Group operating both stand alone theaters and theaters inside Lotte Department Store branches
- Megabox multi – cultural multiplex cinema chain

=== Taiwan ===
- Ambassador Theatres – 13 theaters
- Century Asia Cinemas – 2 theaters
- Miranew Cinemas (with IMAX theater) – 3 theaters
- Shin Kong Cinemas – 3 theaters
- Showtime Cinemas
- Vieshow Cinemas (with IMAX theater) (formerly Warner Village) – 18 theaters

=== Thailand ===
- Major Cineplex – largest cinema group in Thailand. The group includes (by brands):
  - Major Cineplex
  - Major Cinema (EGV Cinema)
  - Major
  - Paragon Cineplex
  - Esplanade Cineplex
  - Quartier Cineart
  - Icon Cineconic
  - One Ultra Screens
  - Cineplex (M Collection brands)
- SF Group
  - SF World Cinema
  - SFX Cinema
  - SF Cinema
  - Emprive Cineclub

=== United Arab Emirates ===
- Novo Cinemas
- VOX Cinemas
- Reel Cinemas

== Europe ==
=== Belgium ===
- Kinepolis

=== France ===
- Pathé Cinémas
- UGC
- CGR Cinémas

=== Greece ===
- Cineplexx
- Ster Cinemas
- Village Cinemas

=== Poland ===
- Cinema City
- Helios
- Multikino

=== Spain ===
- Cine Yelmo
- Cinesa

=== United Kingdom ===
Theatre Chain	Number of Screens	Locations
Cineworld	1,099	109
Curzon	58	16
Everyman Cinemas	155	45
The Light Cinemas	99	13
Merlin Cinemas	59	19
Movie House Cinemas (Northern Ireland)	-	4
Odeon (AMC)	960	120
Omniplex Cinemas	-	22
Picturehouse Cinemas (Cineworld)	93	27
Reel Cinemas	76	15
Showcase (National Amusements)	278	21
Vue	290+	90

=== Rest of Europe ===
- Cinema City - cinema chain owned by Cineworld in Czech Republic, Hungary, Poland, Romania, Slovakia, Bulgaria
- Cinemas NOS – cinema chain in Portugal
- Cineplex - cinema chain in Moldova
- Cineplexx - cinema chain in Austria, Albania, Croatia, Greece, Italy, Kosovo, North Macedonia, Montenegro, Romania, Serbia, Slovenia
- CineStar - cinema chain in Germany, Bosnia and Herzegovina, Czech Republic, Croatia, Serbia, Kosovo, Italy and Switzerland
- Filmstaden - cinema chain owned by Odeon Cinemas Group (AMC Theatres) in Sweden
- Finnkino – cinema chain owned by Odeon Cinemas Group (AMC Theatres) in Finland
- Kinepolis – cinema chain in Belgium, France, Luxembourg, Netherlands, Poland, Spain, Switzerland
- Multikino - cinema chain owned by Vue in Poland, Latvia, Lithuania and Estonia
- Multiplex - cinema chain in Ukraine
- Nordisk - cinema chain in Denmark, Norway and Sweden
- Odeon Cinemas - cinema chain owned by Odeon Cinemas Group (AMC Theatres) in Ireland, Norway and United Kingdom
- Odessa Kino - cinema chain in Ukraine
- Omniplex – cinema chain in the Republic of Ireland and Northern Ireland
- Pathé - cinema chain in Belgium, France, Netherlands, Switzerland, Tunisia and Senegal
- UCI Cinemas - cinema chain owned by Odeon Cinemas Group (AMC Theatres) in Germany, Italy and Portugal
- UGC - cinema chain in France and Belgium
- Village - cinema chain in Greece

=== Former chains ===
- Astoria Cinemas - cinema chain in Sweden
- ABC
- Apollo – cinema chain in the United Kingdom
- MGM
- Palas Cinemas - merged with Cinema City
- Silver Screen (Poland) – merged with Multikino
- Utopolis - cinema chain in Belgium, Netherlands, Luxembourg and France
- Virgin
- Ward Anderson - cinema chain in Ireland
- Warner Village Cinemas

== Oceania ==
=== Australia ===
Theatre Chain	Headquarters	Locations	Notes
Ace Cinemas, operated by The Movie Masters Cinema Group	Sydney		
Dendy Cinemas	Sydney	4	
Event Cinemas	Sydney	62	Previously known as Greater Union, Birch, Carroll & Coyle and Village Cinemas
Grand Cinemas (operated by The Movie Masters Cinema Group)	Perth	6	Ace Cinemas and Grand Cinemas
Hoyts	Sydney	38	Owned by Wanda Cinemas
Palace Cinemas	Balwyn	18	
Reading Cinemas	South Melbourne	29	
United Cinemas	Various	8	
Village Cinemas	Melbourne	26	
Wallis	Richmond	5	

=== New Zealand ===
- Berkeley Cinemas
- Event Cinemas
- Hoyts
- Reading Cinemas

== See also ==
- List of movie theaters
- Film screening
- Home cinema
- Movie palace
- Movie theater
- Independent movie theater
- Multiplex
