= DHA =

DHA, Dha and dha may refer to:

== Chemicals ==
- 3,4-Dihydroxyamphetamine, an amphetamine derivative
- Docosahexaenoic acid, a 22:6 omega-3 fatty acid
- Dehydroandrosterone, an endogenous androgenic steroid
- Dehydroascorbic acid, an oxidized form of ascorbic acid
- Dehydroacetic acid, a pyrone derivative used as a plasticiser, as a fungicide, as a bactericide, and as a food preservative
- Dihydroxyacetone, the active ingredient in sunless or self-tanning skincare products
- 9,10-Dihydroanthracene, a form of anthracene whose center-ring carbons have been reduced
- Dihydroartemisinin, an antimalarial
- Dihydroalprenolol, a beta-adrenergic blocker
- Dehydroalanine, an uncommon unsaturated α-amino acid

== Organizations ==
- Defence Housing Australia
- Defence Housing Authority, Pakistan
  - Defence Housing Authority, Islamabad
  - Defence Housing Authority, Karachi
- Defense Health Agency, a United States agency
- Department of Humanitarian Affairs, United Nations department
- DHA Cinema, a movie theatre
- District health authority, a former type of NHS administrative organisation
- Drug Houses of Australia, a Singapore pharmaceuticals manufacturer
- Demirören Haber Ajansı, a Turkish news agency

== Linguistics ==
- Dha (Indic), a glyph in the Brahmic family of script
- Dha (Javanese) (ꦝ), a letter in the Javanese script

== Other ==
- Dah, Ladakh, India
- Dhahran International Airport
- Dha (sword)
- Directory Harvest Attack
- Disarmament as Humanitarian Action, a research project
- Doctor of Health Administration, a doctoral degree
- D.Ha., short for United States District Court for the District of Hawaii
