= Cineplex =

A cineplex is a multiplex, a movie theatre with several screens, coming from the words cinema and complex.

Cineplex may also refer to:

- Cineplex Entertainment, a Canadian entertainment company based in Toronto, Ontario
- Cineplex Odeon Corporation, a former Canadian movie theater operator, present in Canada and the United States
- Colors Cineplex, an Indian movie television channel
  - Colors Cineplex Bollywood, movie channel broadcasting Bollywood films
  - Colors Cineplex Superhits, movie channel broadcasting blockbuster Hindi (Bollywood) films
- Loews Cineplex Entertainment, a former movie theater chain operating in North America, oldest in the continent
- Universe Cineplex, a movie theater chain in Karachi, Pakistan

== See also ==
- Cineplexx (disambiguation)
- Movie theater
- List of movie theater chains
