= Cineplexx =

Cineplexx may refer to:

- Cineplexx Cinemas, Austrian cinema chain
- Cineplexx (musician) (born 1973), Argentinian singer and songwriter

== See also ==
- Cineplex (disambiguation)
