= RP Mall (disambiguation) =

RP Mall may refer to,

- RP Mall, Kollam - A 7 floor Shopping Mall in the city of Kollam, India
- RP Mall, Kozhikode - A shopping Mall located at the city of Kozhikode, India
