= Mtime =

Mtime may refer to:

- st_mtime, a file's last modification time, used by the stat() system call in Unix
- Mtime.com, Chinese film website
