= Stephen Mann =

Stephen Mann may refer to:

- Stephen Mann (chemist) (born 1955), British academic
- Stephen Mann (theater owner) (born 1954), American businessman
- Steve Mann (inventor) (born 1962), Canadian inventor and professor
- Steve Mann (American guitarist) (1943–2009), American musician
- Stevie Mann (born 1976), Irish musician
- Steve Mann (English musician)
