= Silver Screen =

Silver Screen may refer to:

- Silver screen, a type of projection screen
- Silverscreen, a British retail chain
- Silver Screen (Poland), a Polish cinema chain
- Silver Screen (magazine), an American film magazine (1930–77)
- Silver Screen (novel), a science fiction novel by Justina Robson
- Silver Screen Classics, a Canadian cable TV channel
- Silver Screen Partners, an American theatrical motion picture financier
- Silver Screen Pictures, an Indian film company
- Silver Screen Awards Competition, Singapore International Film Festival
- Silver Screen Handicap, an American Thoroughbred horse race, now known as the Affirmed Handicap

Similarly named

- Songs of the Silver Screen, studio album by Sons of the San Joaquin

Others

- Movie theatre, sometimes referred to as the silver screen.
