= Galeria Malta =

Former shopping centre in Poznań, Poland

- Galeria Malta
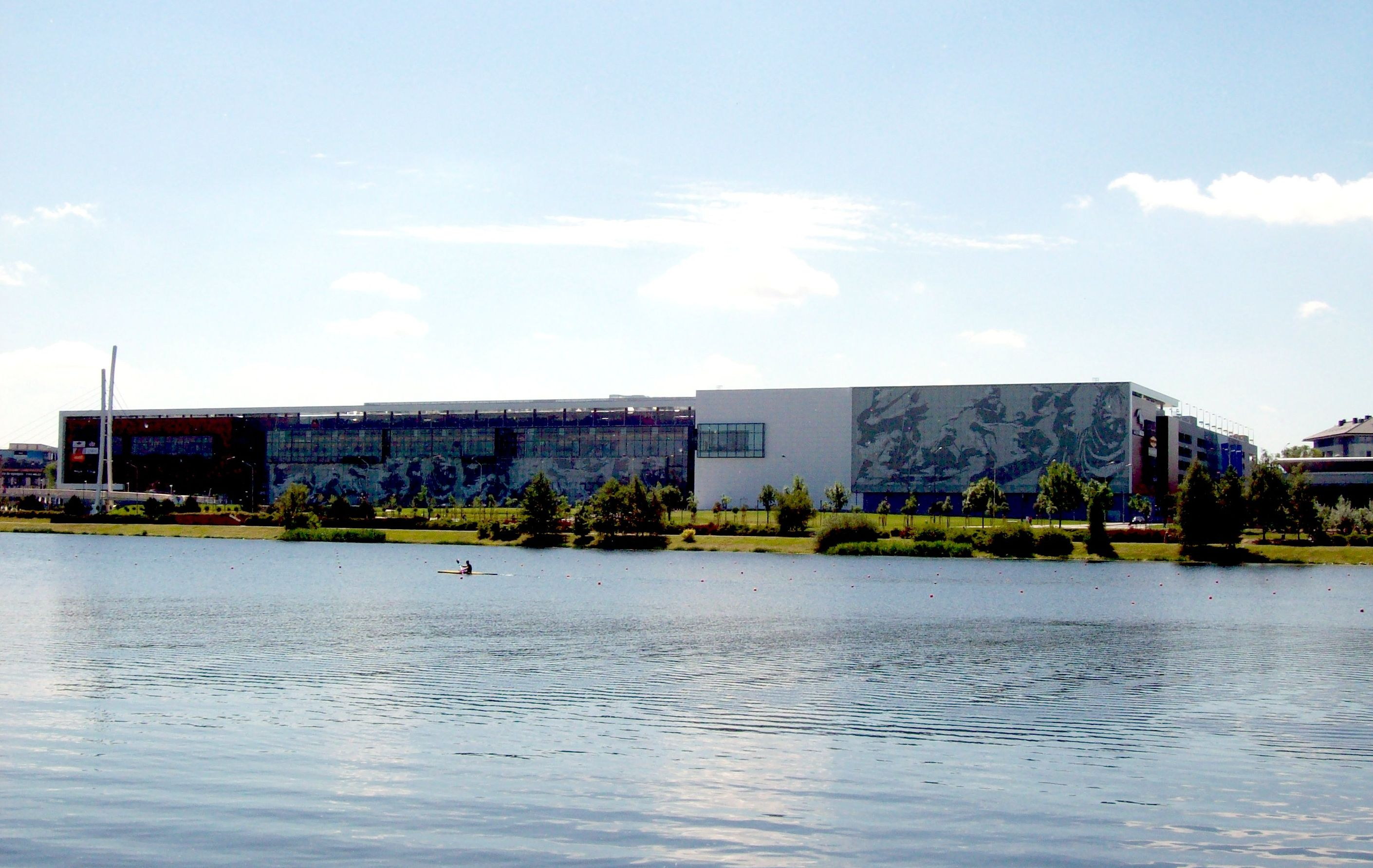
- Galeria Malta – view from Lake Malta (2009)
- Location: Poznań, Poland
- Coordinates: 52°24′05.65″N 16°57′34.05″E
- Address: ul. Maltańska 1, 61-131 Poznań
- Opened: 25 March 2009
- Closed: 18 December 2023
- Floor area: 162,000 m^{2} (1,740,000 sq ft) total, including 54,000 m^{2} (580,000 sq ft) of retail and entertainment space
- Floors: 3
- Parking: 1,800 spaces
- Website: www.galeriamalta.pl

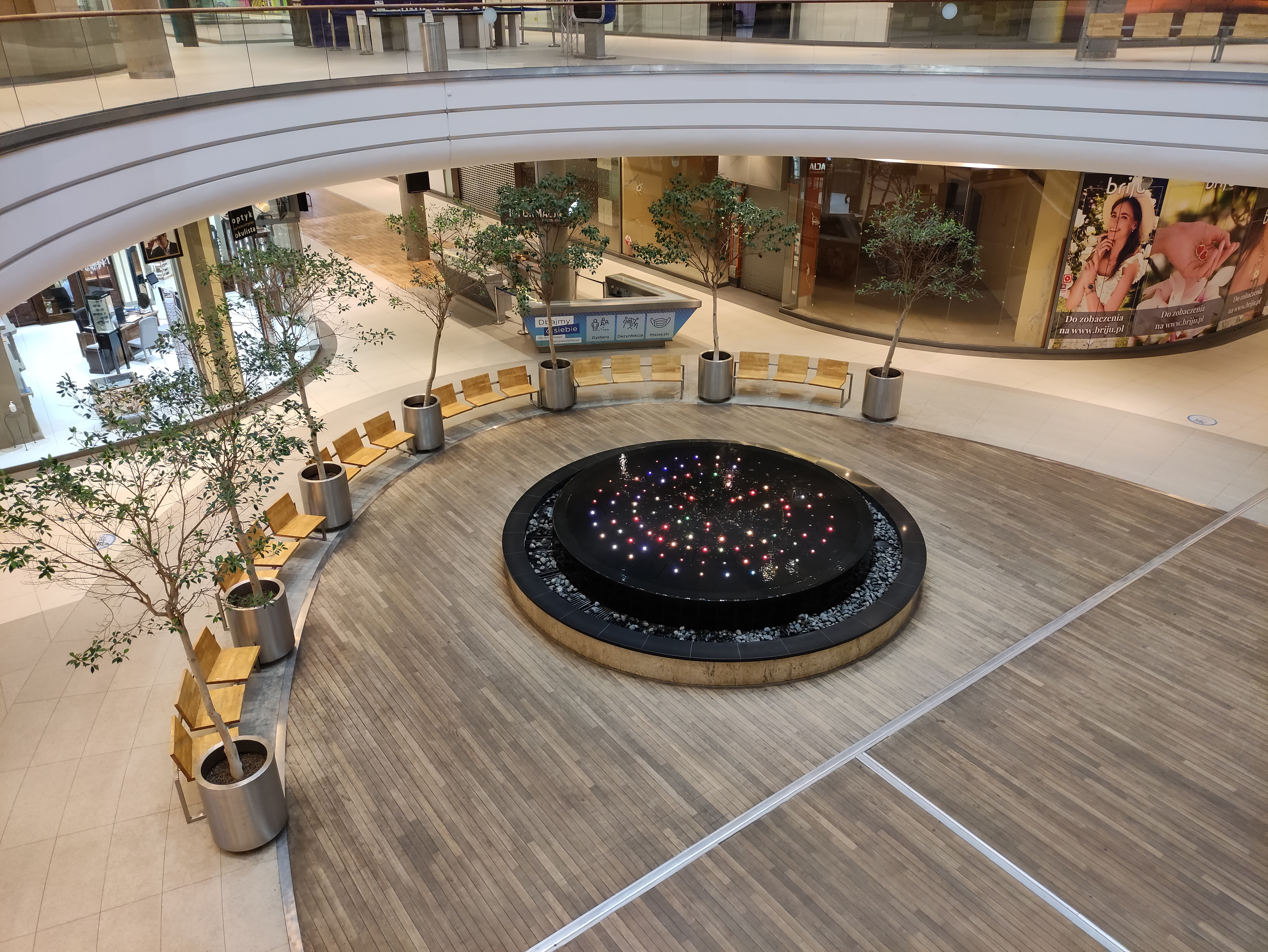
Interior of Galeria Malta in Poznań.

Galeria Malta was a shopping centre in Poznań, opened for use on 25 March 2009, operating in the years 2009–2023.

== History ==
Galeria Malta was located at the junction of Antoni Baraniak Street and Jana Pawła II Street in Łacina, which is part of the auxiliary unit Osiedle Rataje, in the direct neighbourhood of Lake Malta and the recreational areas of Malta.

It contained several dozen shops, service points, cafés, restaurants, a multi-screen Multikino, an Empik store, a fitness club and a playground for children. It occupied 162,000 m² of total area, including 54,000 m² of retail and entertainment space.

The building was connected with the lakeside part of Lake Malta, had a free multi-storey car park for 1,800 cars and lifts adapted for the needs of disabled people.

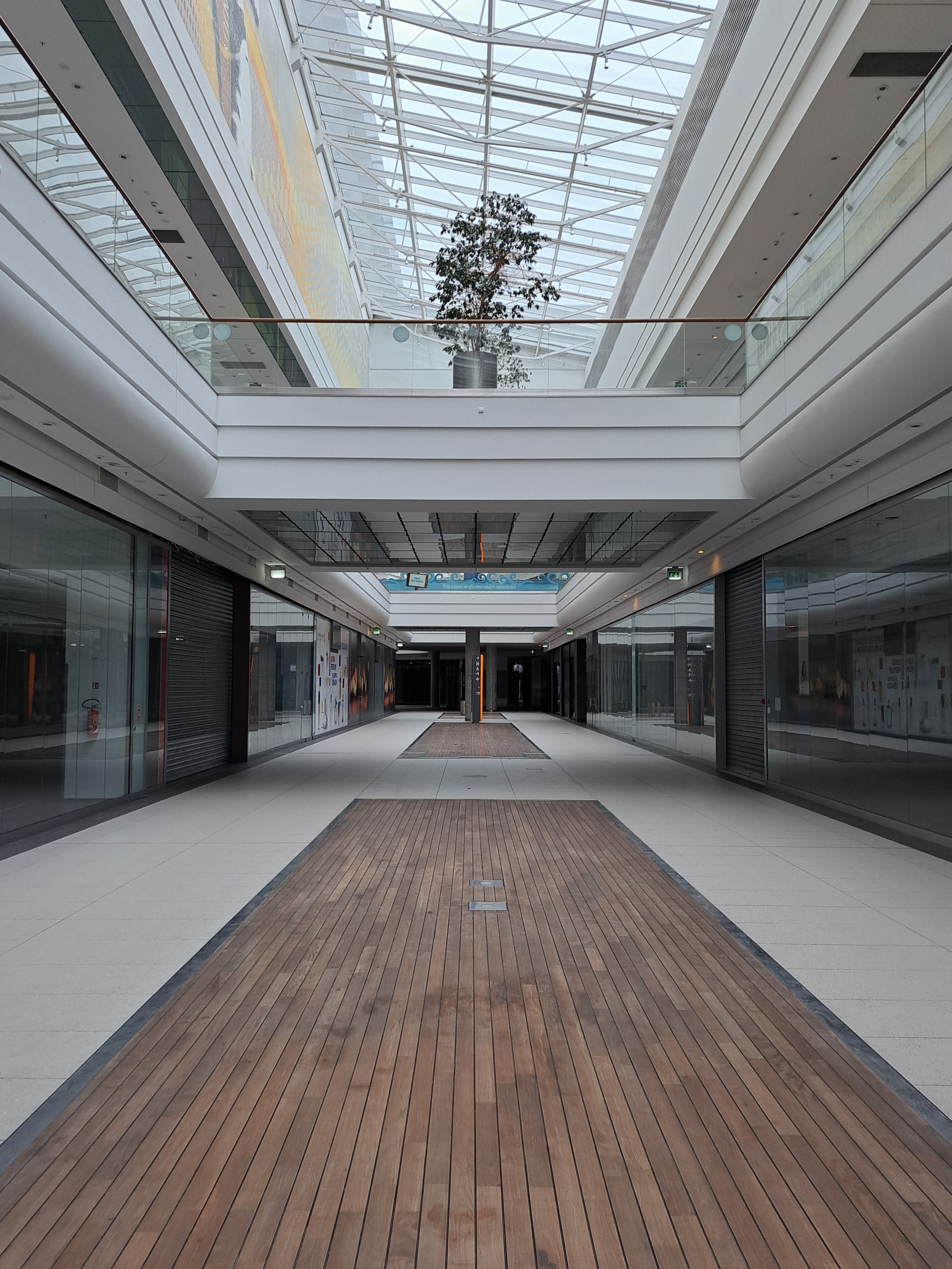
Corridor of the abandoned Galeria Malta on the last day of operation

After the opening in 2016 of the nearby Posnania shopping centre, individual shops and retail points inside started to gradually close. In 2020, as many as two thirds of them were vacant premises.

In December 2020, information appeared about work on changing the local spatial development plan, which would allow the function of the building to be changed.

In May 2023, an application for the demolition of the shopping centre building was submitted to the Department of Urban Planning and Architecture of the Poznań City Hall.

In July 2023, permission was issued for the demolition of the building, which was to take place within the next three years. The last premises in the building, the Malta Squash sports club was closed on 18 December 2023.

On 8 February 2024, demolition of the Malta Shopping Centre began and in July 2025, the demolition was completed.
