= Antaeus Cinema Line =

Chinese cinema chain

- Industry: Film
- Headquarters: China
- Area served: China
- Parent: Perfect World

Antaeus Cinema Line is a Chinese cinema chain. It's the 13th largest exhibitor in China, with 1,200 screens in 227 theatres. It will be acquired by Perfect World.
