= The O2 Belfast =

Entertainment and science learning centre, Belfast

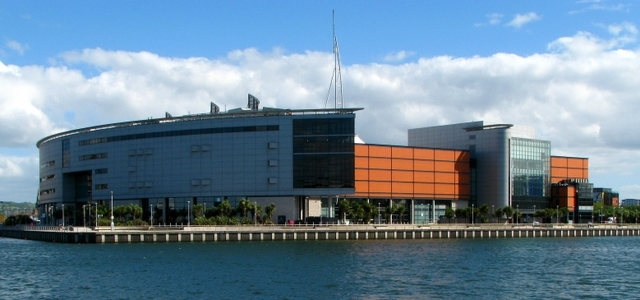
- Complex seen from Clarendon Dock (c. 2008)
- Former names: Landmark Millennium Project (planning/construction); Odyssey Centre (2000–2013); Odyssey Arena (2000–2015); SSE Arena (2015–2026)

General information
- Location: Titanic Quarter, 2 Queen's Quay; Belfast BT3 9QQ; Northern Ireland
- Coordinates: 54°36′15″N 5°54′54″W
- Groundbreaking: June 1998
- Opened: 2 December 2000
- Inaugurated: 29 November 2001
- Renovated: 2015
- Cost: £120 million
- Renovation cost: £3 million
- Client: Belfast Giants (EIHL) (2001–present)
- Owner: The Odyssey Trust Company Ltd (Note: Food, beverage and entertainment in The O2 Belfast is managed by Matagorda 2.)

Design and construction
- Architect: Consarc Design Group
- Developer: Delap & Waller, Tavakoli Associates
- Structural engineer: Ballykine
- Services engineer: RPS Group
- Other designers: Teather Walls Architects
- Main contractor: Farrans Construction, Gilbert-Ash

Renovating team
- Architect: H.J. Lyons Architects
- Structural engineer: Turley & Associates
- Services engineer: RPS Group

Other information
- Seating capacity: 11,200
- Parking: 1,500 spaces

Website
- theo2belfast.com

The O2 Belfast is an entertainment venue in the Titanic Quarter in Belfast. It includes an arena with a capacity of 11,200 people; W5, a science and discovery centre; and a shopping mall with restaurants. It is owned by The Odyssey Trust, a charity. The naming rights to the venue are owned by O2.

The arena is home to the Belfast Giants, the only professional ice hockey team in Ireland.

== History ==
Arena logo used from 2000 to 2015

The concept of the complex originated in 1992 and was finalised in June 1998. It opened in December 2000, with expansions in March and May 2001.

The Odyssey Centre was 50% funded by a £45 million grant from the Millennium Commission as part of the Landmark Project for Northern Ireland, with matched funding from the Department of Education for Northern Ireland, the Sheridan Group, and the Sports Council for Northern Ireland. The application to the Millennium Commission was led by the Ulster Museum, which wished to develop a science centre in partnership with Peter Curistan, who wished to develop an IMAX, and then led the development of the arena with consultants L&R Leisure. The name "Odyssey" was chosen to symbolise the 'journey of discovery' that would be the science centre; Michael Montgomery, a 14-year-old at the time, came up with the name. The complex adopted the name, and the Science Centre became W5.

The arena opened in 2000, and W5 opened on 31 March 2001, with the pavilion opening a few months later. The Odyssey cost £120 million to complete. The whole complex Odyssey is held in trust by The Odyssey Trust Company Limited (a charity), initially with an operating and management agreement with SMG for the arena, a lease to Sheridan for the pavilion and IMAX, and National Museums Northern Ireland for W5.

In 2011, The Odyssey Trust Company Limited took operation of over W5, and now also operates the arena via a trading subsidiary.

In 2011, the Odyssey Pavilion, which was leased by the Sheridan Group, went into administration, and the building went under the control of KPMG temporarily until it was purchased by Matagorda 2.

== Facilities ==
=== Arena ===
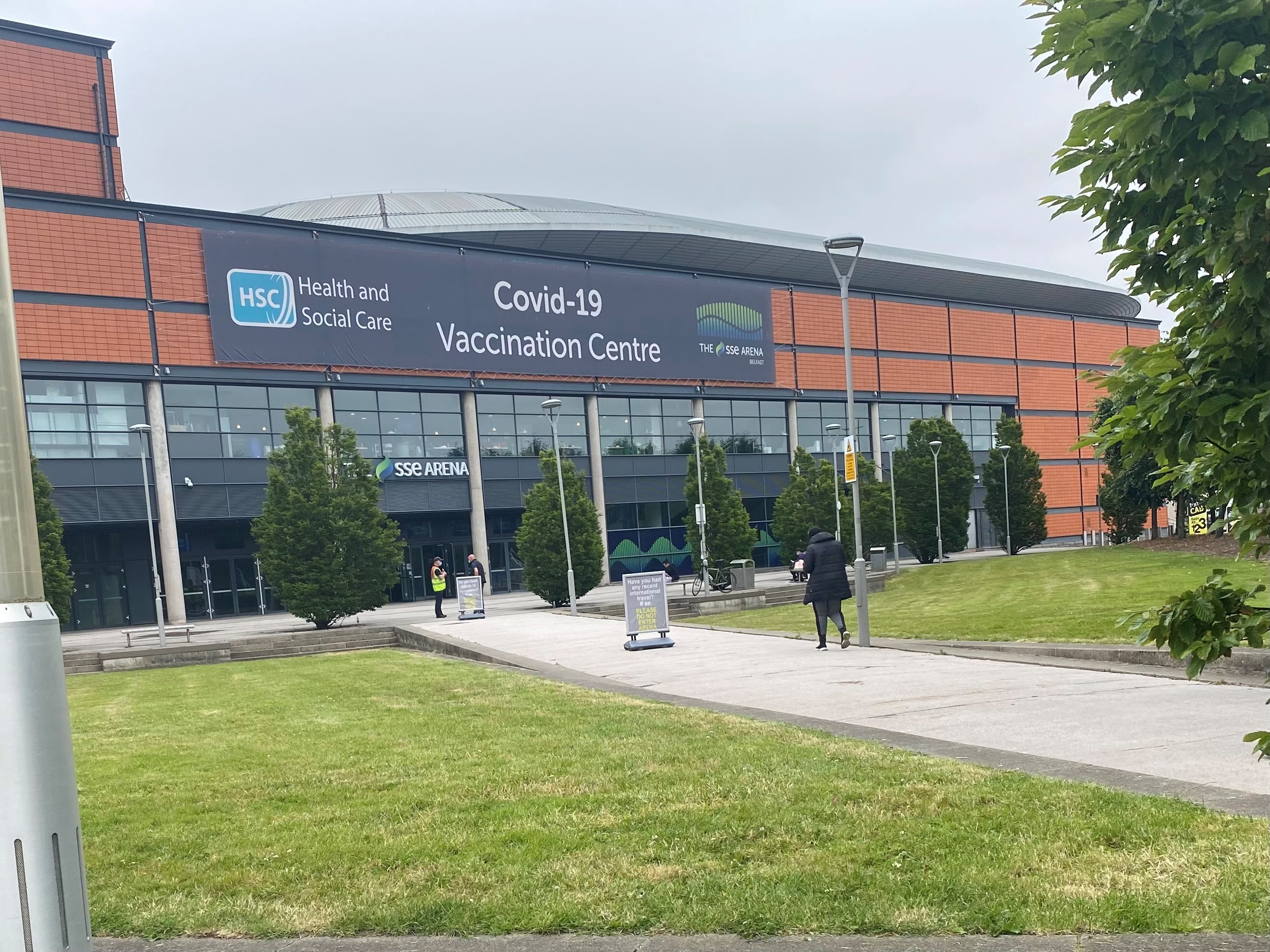
Mass vaccination centre at the arena in July 2021

The arena within The O2 Belfast was known as the Odyssey Arena from 2000 to 2015 and The SSE Arena, Belfast between 2015 and July 2026. It hosts concerts and sporting events, including Belfast Giants games.

In June 2015, it was announced the arena would undergo a £3 million refurbishment.

The naming rights were owned by SSE plc from 2015 to 2026.

In April 2026, O2 acquired the naming rights to the complex under a 10-year deal expiring in 2036.

An O2 Blueroom VIP area is set to open in the arena, which has also been refurbished to feature new digital screens.

==== Sports ====
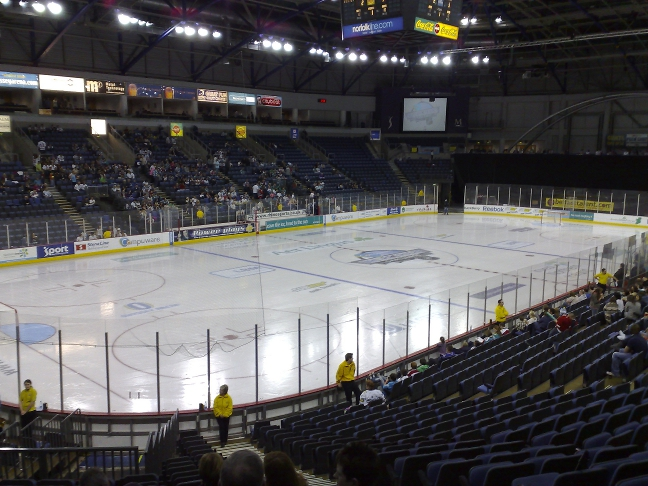
Interior bowl of the arena before an ice hockey match, October 2010

Since opening, The O2 Belfast has been the home to the Belfast Giants. The Belfast Giants play weekly home games against teams from across the UK between September and April each year.

In October 2010, the Boston Bruins faced the Belfast Giants "Selects" in an NHL Challenge match.

The venue also hosts live sporting events, including WWE, which brings superstars from WWE Raw and WWE Smackdown.

In June 2007, the arena hosted UFC 72.

Carl Frampton has achieved a 6-0 knockout record at the arena in 6 matches between 2011 and 2018. His first fight at the venue was in 2010 when he won the Commonwealth super-bantamweight title by a fourth-round TKO stoppage against Mark Quon.

Since 2008, the venue has also hosted the Premier League Darts.

The arena hosted the 3ICE World Cup in July 2026.

=== Shopping mall ===
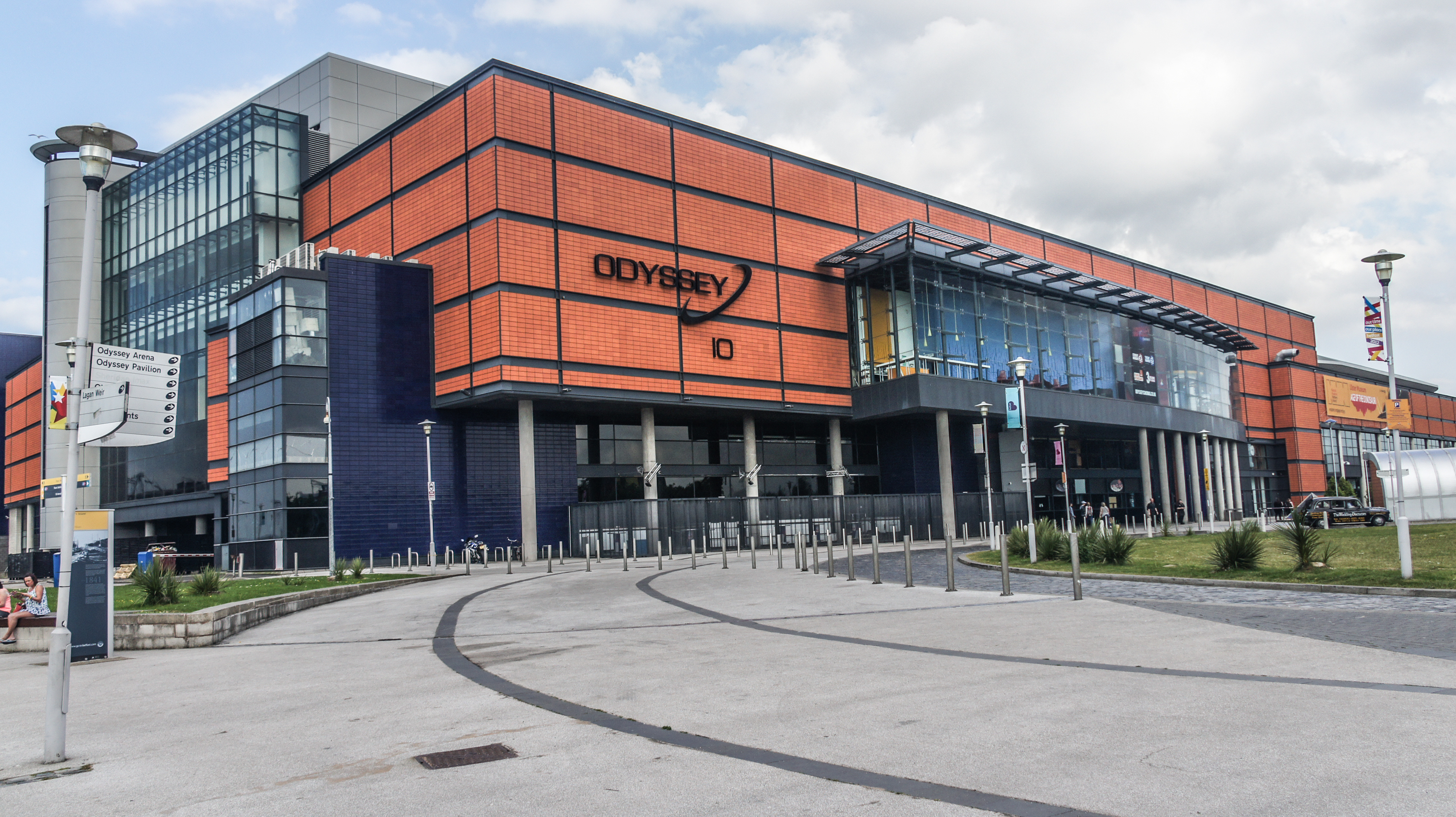
Entrance to Odyssey Place

Formerly known as the Odyssey Pavilion and Odyssey Place, The O2 Belfast houses multiple shops, restaurants, cafes, entertainment venues, and leisure facilities.

The Odyssey Pavilion opened in 2000, with restaurants, a 12-screen cinema, and an IMAX cinema.

In 2010, the company that owned the pavilion fell into administration, and the building was temporarily controlled by KPMG, until it was acquired by SSE plc.

In September 2012, the Odyssey Pavilion was put up for sale by the administrators for £10 million.

The developer of the venue, Peter Curistan, was declared bankrupt by a court in 2013.

In 2014, Omniplex Cinemas, launched a bid to take over the lease of the pavilion. Omniplex would have rebranded the Odyssey Cinemas area under its own brand, but The Odyssey Trust rejected the bid, which was reported to be underestimated in value.

Matagorda 2 acquired a 150-year lease of the Odyssey Pavilion in 2016.

In the same year, the developer of the Pavilion, Peter Curistan, was banned as a company director for six years, which followed the collapse of five companies that ran up losses of more than £12 million. Some of the companies operated entertainment businesses within the venue, which was formerly controlled by the businessman.

In 2017, a refurbishment was announced. In 2019, it was announced that all of the tenants inside the complex would close as part of the redevelopment and cinema chain Cineworld announced will be redeveloping and entering the space of the previous Odyssey Cinemas area. Hollywood Bowl Group also announced a Hollywood Bowl in the former Odyssey Bowl.

The complex and tenants mostly closed in January 2020 for the redevelopment, with the cinema and the bowling alley permanently closing in March 2020 and in May 2021, respectively. The Odyssey Pavillion reopened as Odyssey Place in April 2023.

=== W5 at The O2 ===
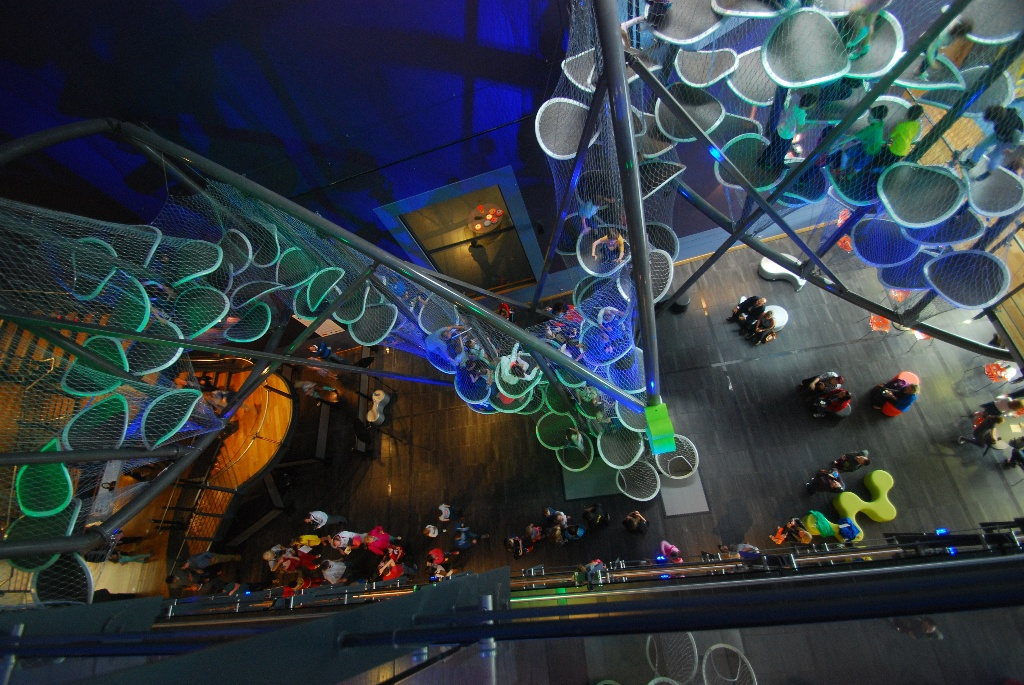
Luckey Climber, 2014

W5, which stands for "Who, What, Where, When, Why", was developed by Sally Montgomery, the Ulster Museum's project director (and then founding CEO), with the exhibitions being designed by Hands On Inc (Florida, United States), and the Ontario Science Centre, Canada. W5 has roughly 250 interactive exhibits, along with eight themed exhibition zones, in 3,500 square metres of exhibition space, workshop space, and lecture theatre.

W5 was a wholly owned subsidiary of the National Museums Northern Ireland until March 2012, when it became a subsidiary of The Odyssey Trust. W5 has won a number of awards, including Best Visitor Attraction, several times. In 2013, W5 opened 'Climbit', the biggest Luckey Climber in Europe where small children can climb up twelve metres in total safety.

As part of the redevelopment of the Odyssey complex, W5 was also refurbished and reopened in October 2021.

== Awards ==
In 2007, the Odyssey Arena was shortlisted for "International Large Venue of the Year" (over 8,000 seats) outside of North America by Pollstar, making it among the top 7 large concert venues worldwide.

The mobile app of arena won the "App of The Year" at the 2017 DANI (Digital Advertising Northern Ireland) Awards.
