= Movie House Cinemas =

Chain of cinemas based in Northern Ireland

Movie House Cinemas Ltd is a cinema chain based in Northern Ireland. The company predominantly covers County Antrim, however it also has cinemas in County Londonderry. The company’s head office is in Belfast.

== Cinemas ==
- Movie House Cityside (Yorkgate), Belfast, Co. Antrim.
- Movie House Dublin Road, Belfast, Co. Antrim.
  - (Now closed to make way for software firm Kainos who recently purchased the site)
- Odyssey Bowl, Belfast, Co. Antrim
  - (Now closed to make way for Hollywood Bowl)
- Movie House Glengormley, Co. Antrim
  - Notably the first multiplex cinema to open in Northern Ireland.
- Movie House Maghera, Co. Londonderry.
- Movie House Coleraine (Jet Centre), Co. Londonderry.
  - Also has a ten-pin bowling alley, soft play area (Alley Cats), and arcade.

== History ==
The company first started operating in 1990.

In 2010, the company began to operate Odyssey Bowl in the Odyssey Complex, they operated it until the Hollywood Bowl Group took the lease in 2019 and reopened it as a Hollywood Bowl in 2022.

In 2013, Movie House Cinemas began an advertising campaign for various services the company offered, during its own film screenings, featuring local comedian Collin Geddis as Barry "The Blender" Henderson (known for his YouTube show 'I Am Fighter').

In 2015 Belfast-born Kenneth Branagh attended a screening of his film Cinderella at the Dublin Road site in support of local charities Into Film and Northern Ireland Council for Voluntary Action.
