= RP Mall =

Shopping mall in Kozhikode, India

RP Mall is a shopping mall located at Kozhikode, India. The mall contains a multiplex in its second and third floor. The multiplex has six screens spread over an area of 25,000 sq.ft has a total capacity of 610 seats. The multiplex contains five public screens and a spa theatre for private screening. Two of the screens also has 3D facility. The mall has a multicusine food court and children play area. It is the first multiplex in the city of Kozhikode. The multiplex is named as PVS Film City.
