= UME Cinemas =

Chinese cinema chain

- Native name: UME影城
- Industry: Film
- Founded: 2002
- Founder: Ng See-yuen
- Headquarters: China
- Key people: Lu Yao (chairman and president)

UME Cinemas (Chinese: UME影城) is a Chinese cinema chain. As of December 2015, it had 25 cinemas and 400 screens in China.

Established in 2002 by Ng See-yuen, UME is short for Ultimate Movie Experience. According to Variety, in the 10 years after its founding, UME developed into a significant player in the nation's premium theater chains and established collaborated with festivals. It worked with Shanghai International Film Festival, which regularly utilized its venue in Xintiandi. UME was purchased in 2017 by China Media Capital. UME locations attracted 22 million visitors in 2019, giving the company almost $146 million (¥1 billion) in revenue.

The UME Beijing Huaxing branch opened in July 2002 and closed in March 2025. It featured Beijing's inaugural IMAX screen in June 2006. The branch's yearly box office revenue was more than ¥97 million in December 2010, achieving the year's top box office performance in China's cinema market.
