= Dha (Javanese) =

dha
- ꦝ
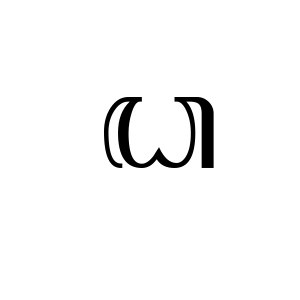
- Aksara nglegena

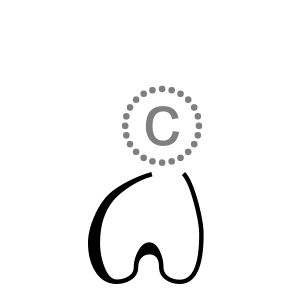
- Aksara pasangan

Usage
- Writing system: Javanese script
- Latin orthography: dha
- Sound values: [ḍ]
- In Unicode: A99D

ꦝ is a syllable in the Javanese script that represents the sounds /ɖɔ/, /ɖa/. It is transliterated to Latin as "dha", and sometimes in Indonesian orthography as "dho". It has another form (pasangan), which is ◌꧀ꦝ, but represented by a single Unicode code point, U+A99D.

== Pasangan ==
Its pasangan form ◌꧀ꦝ, is located on the bottom side of the previous syllable.

== Murda ==
The letter ꦝ doesn't have a murda form.

== Mahaprana ==
Mahaprana letters were originally aspirated consonants used in Sanskrit and Kawi transliterations. However, there are no aspirated consonants in modern Javanese. The mahaprana form of ꦝ is ꦞ.

== Glyphs ==
Nglegena forms				Pasangan forms			
ꦝ dha	ꦝꦃ dhah	ꦝꦁ dhang	ꦝꦂ dhar	◌꧀ꦝ -dha	◌꧀ꦝꦃ -dhah	◌꧀ꦝꦁ -dhang	◌꧀ꦝꦂ -dhar
ꦝꦺ dhe	ꦝꦺꦃ dheh	ꦝꦺꦁ dheng	ꦝꦺꦂ dher	◌꧀ꦝꦺ -dhe	◌꧀ꦝꦺꦃ -dheh	◌꧀ꦝꦺꦁ -dheng	◌꧀ꦝꦺꦂ -dher
ꦝꦼ dhê	ꦝꦼꦃ dhêh	ꦝꦼꦁ dhêng	ꦝꦼꦂ dhêr	◌꧀ꦝꦼ -dhê	◌꧀ꦝꦼꦃ -dhêh	◌꧀ꦝꦼꦁ -dhêng	◌꧀ꦝꦼꦂ -dhêr
ꦝꦶ dhi	ꦝꦶꦃ dhih	ꦝꦶꦁ dhing	ꦝꦶꦂ dhir	◌꧀ꦝꦶ -dhi	◌꧀ꦝꦶꦃ -dhih	◌꧀ꦝꦶꦁ -dhing	◌꧀ꦝꦶꦂ -dhir
ꦝꦺꦴ dho	ꦝꦺꦴꦃ dhoh	ꦝꦺꦴꦁ dhong	ꦝꦺꦴꦂ dhor	◌꧀ꦝꦺꦴ -dho	◌꧀ꦝꦺꦴꦃ -dhoh	◌꧀ꦝꦺꦴꦁ -dhong	◌꧀ꦝꦺꦴꦂ -dhor
ꦝꦸ dhu	ꦝꦸꦃ dhuh	ꦝꦸꦁ dhung	ꦝꦸꦂ dhur	◌꧀ꦝꦸ -dhu	◌꧀ꦝꦸꦃ -dhuh	◌꧀ꦝꦸꦁ -dhung	◌꧀ꦝꦸꦂ -dhur
ꦝꦿ dhra	ꦝꦿꦃ dhrah	ꦝꦿꦁ dhrang	ꦝꦿꦂ dhrar	◌꧀ꦝꦿ -dhra	◌꧀ꦝꦿꦃ -dhrah	◌꧀ꦝꦿꦁ -dhrang	◌꧀ꦝꦿꦂ -dhrar
ꦝꦿꦺ dhre	ꦝꦿꦺꦃ dhreh	ꦝꦿꦺꦁ dhreng	ꦝꦿꦺꦂ dhrer	◌꧀ꦝꦿꦺ -dhre	◌꧀ꦝꦿꦺꦃ -dhreh	◌꧀ꦝꦿꦺꦁ -dhreng	◌꧀ꦝꦿꦺꦂ -dhrer
ꦝꦽ dhrê	ꦝꦽꦃ dhrêh	ꦝꦽꦁ dhrêng	ꦝꦽꦂ dhrêr	◌꧀ꦝꦽ -dhrê	◌꧀ꦝꦽꦃ -dhrêh	◌꧀ꦝꦽꦁ -dhrêng	◌꧀ꦝꦽꦂ -dhrêr
ꦝꦿꦶ dhri	ꦝꦿꦶꦃ dhrih	ꦝꦿꦶꦁ dhring	ꦝꦿꦶꦂ dhrir	◌꧀ꦝꦿꦶ -dhri	◌꧀ꦝꦿꦶꦃ -dhrih	◌꧀ꦝꦿꦶꦁ -dhring	◌꧀ꦝꦿꦶꦂ -dhrir
ꦝꦿꦺꦴ dhro	ꦝꦿꦺꦴꦃ dhroh	ꦝꦿꦺꦴꦁ dhrong	ꦝꦿꦺꦴꦂ dhror	◌꧀ꦝꦿꦺꦴ -dhro	◌꧀ꦝꦿꦺꦴꦃ -dhroh	◌꧀ꦝꦿꦺꦴꦁ -dhrong	◌꧀ꦝꦿꦺꦴꦂ -dhror
ꦝꦿꦸ dhru	ꦝꦿꦸꦃ dhruh	ꦝꦿꦸꦁ dhrung	ꦝꦿꦸꦂ dhrur	◌꧀ꦝꦿꦸ -dhru	◌꧀ꦝꦿꦸꦃ -dhruh	◌꧀ꦝꦿꦸꦁ -dhrung	◌꧀ꦝꦿꦸꦂ -dhrur
ꦝꦾ dhya	ꦝꦾꦃ dhyah	ꦝꦾꦁ dhyang	ꦝꦾꦂ dhyar	◌꧀ꦝꦾ -dhya	◌꧀ꦝꦾꦃ -dhyah	◌꧀ꦝꦾꦁ -dhyang	◌꧀ꦝꦾꦂ -dhyar
ꦝꦾꦺ dhye	ꦝꦾꦺꦃ dhyeh	ꦝꦾꦺꦁ dhyeng	ꦝꦾꦺꦂ dhyer	◌꧀ꦝꦾꦺ -dhye	◌꧀ꦝꦾꦺꦃ -dhyeh	◌꧀ꦝꦾꦺꦁ -dhyeng	◌꧀ꦝꦾꦺꦂ -dhyer
ꦝꦾꦼ dhyê	ꦝꦾꦼꦃ dhyêh	ꦝꦾꦼꦁ dhyêng	ꦝꦾꦼꦂ dhyêr	◌꧀ꦝꦾꦼ -dhyê	◌꧀ꦝꦾꦼꦃ -dhyêh	◌꧀ꦝꦾꦼꦁ -dhyêng	◌꧀ꦝꦾꦼꦂ -dhyêr
ꦝꦾꦶ dhyi	ꦝꦾꦶꦃ dhyih	ꦝꦾꦶꦁ dhying	ꦝꦾꦶꦂ dhyir	◌꧀ꦝꦾꦶ -dhyi	◌꧀ꦝꦾꦶꦃ -dhyih	◌꧀ꦝꦾꦶꦁ -dhying	◌꧀ꦝꦾꦶꦂ -dhyir
ꦝꦾꦺꦴ dhyo	ꦝꦾꦺꦴꦃ dhyoh	ꦝꦾꦺꦴꦁ dhyong	ꦝꦾꦺꦴꦂ dhyor	◌꧀ꦝꦾꦺꦴ -dhyo	◌꧀ꦝꦾꦺꦴꦃ -dhyoh	◌꧀ꦝꦾꦺꦴꦁ -dhyong	◌꧀ꦝꦾꦺꦴꦂ -dhyor
ꦝꦾꦸ dhyu	ꦝꦾꦸꦃ dhyuh	ꦝꦾꦸꦁ dhyung	ꦝꦾꦸꦂ dhyur	◌꧀ꦝꦾꦸ -dhyu	◌꧀ꦝꦾꦸꦃ -dhyuh	◌꧀ꦝꦾꦸꦁ -dhyung	◌꧀ꦝꦾꦸꦂ -dhyur

== Unicode block ==
Javanese script was added to the Unicode Standard in October, 2009 with the release of version 5.2.

Javanese^{[1]}^{[2]} Official Unicode Consortium code chart (PDF)
	0	1	2	3	4	5	6	7	8	9	A	B	C	D	E	F
U+A98x	ꦀ	ꦁ	ꦂ	ꦃ	ꦄ	ꦅ	ꦆ	ꦇ	ꦈ	ꦉ	ꦊ	ꦋ	ꦌ	ꦍ	ꦎ	ꦏ
U+A99x	ꦐ	ꦑ	ꦒ	ꦓ	ꦔ	ꦕ	ꦖ	ꦗ	ꦘ	ꦙ	ꦚ	ꦛ	ꦜ	ꦝ	ꦞ	ꦟ
U+A9Ax	ꦠ	ꦡ	ꦢ	ꦣ	ꦤ	ꦥ	ꦦ	ꦧ	ꦨ	ꦩ	ꦪ	ꦫ	ꦬ	ꦭ	ꦮ	ꦯ
U+A9Bx	ꦰ	ꦱ	ꦲ	꦳	ꦴ	ꦵ	ꦶ	ꦷ	ꦸ	ꦹ	ꦺ	ꦻ	ꦼ	ꦽ	ꦾ	ꦿ
U+A9Cx	꧀	꧁	꧂	꧃	꧄	꧅	꧆	꧇	꧈	꧉	꧊	꧋	꧌	꧍		ꧏ
U+A9Dx	꧐	꧑	꧒	꧓	꧔	꧕	꧖	꧗	꧘	꧙					꧞	꧟
Notes 1.As of Unicode version 17.0 2.Grey areas indicate non-assigned code points
