= Apple Cinemas =

American movie theater chain

- Type: Private
- Industry: Movie theater
- Founded: 2010 in Cambridge, Massachusetts, U.S.
- Headquarters: Walpole, Massachusetts
- Number of locations: 14
- Area served: United States (locations in California, Connecticut, Maine, Massachusetts, New Hampshire, New York and Rhode Island)
- Website: www.applecinemas.com

Apple Cinemas is an American movie theater chain based in Walpole, Massachusetts. The chain initially operated in the Northeastern United States and has 14 locations.

== History ==
Apple Cinemas was founded in 2010 and named for Apple Valley Mall in Smithfield, Rhode Island, where the first location was planned but never opened. Its first theatre opened in 2013 in Cambridge, Massachusetts, and eventually expanded to Connecticut, Maine, New Hampshire, Massachusetts, New York and Rhode Island, with a Pennsylvania location in Philadelphia planned.

In July 2025, the chain opened its first location outside of the Northeastern United States in San Francisco, California, taking over the 14-screen theatre at the 1000 Van Ness building formerly operated by AMC Theatres and CGV Cinemas. In August 2025, shortly after the location opened and its announcement of future Bay Area locations, Apple Inc. filed a lawsuit against the chain, claiming its name caused customer confusion and it was leveraging it to secure favorable leasing deals.
