= Digicel IMAX =

IMAX theatre in Trinidad and Tobago

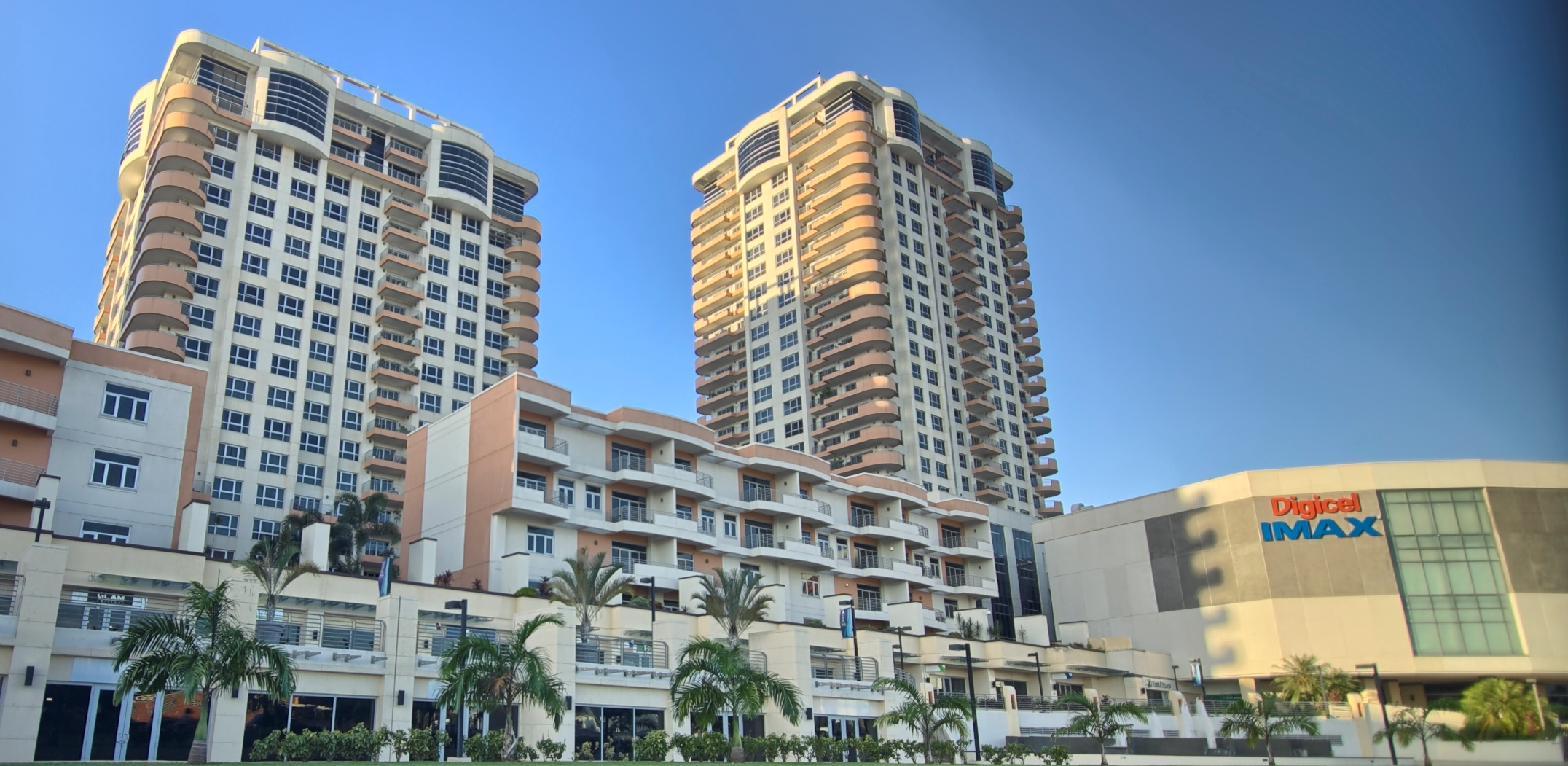
- Digicel Imax within the One Woodbrook Place development
- Industry: Leisure, Retailing, Entertainment & Refreshments
- Headquarters: One Woodbrook Place, Port of Spain, Trinidad, Republic of Trinidad and Tobago
- Products: Tickets, Popcorn, Drinks & Confectionery
- Website: Digicel IMAX

Digicel IMAX is Trinidad and Tobago (and the Caribbean)'s first and only IMAX 3D movie theatre.

Digicel is the title sponsor. Other sponsors include Carib Brewery, Ansa Automotive, Atlantic LNG and First Citizens Bank.

The Digicel IMAX has the largest screen in the Caribbean at a size of It is 12 metres (39 ft) high, 21 metres (69 ft) with a seating capacity of 360. The cinema is located at One Woodbrook Place, Port of Spain.

Digicel IMAX was launched by Ingrid Jahra, the founder of the Giant Screen Entertainment.

There were some legal disagreements with the developer; however, the theatre was opened in August 2011, and offers both Hollywood blockbuster movies as well as IMAX educational films, which are targeted mostly to schools in Trinidad and Tobago
