= Cinemex =

Cineplex company based in Mexico

Cadena Mexicana de Exhibición S.A. de C.V.

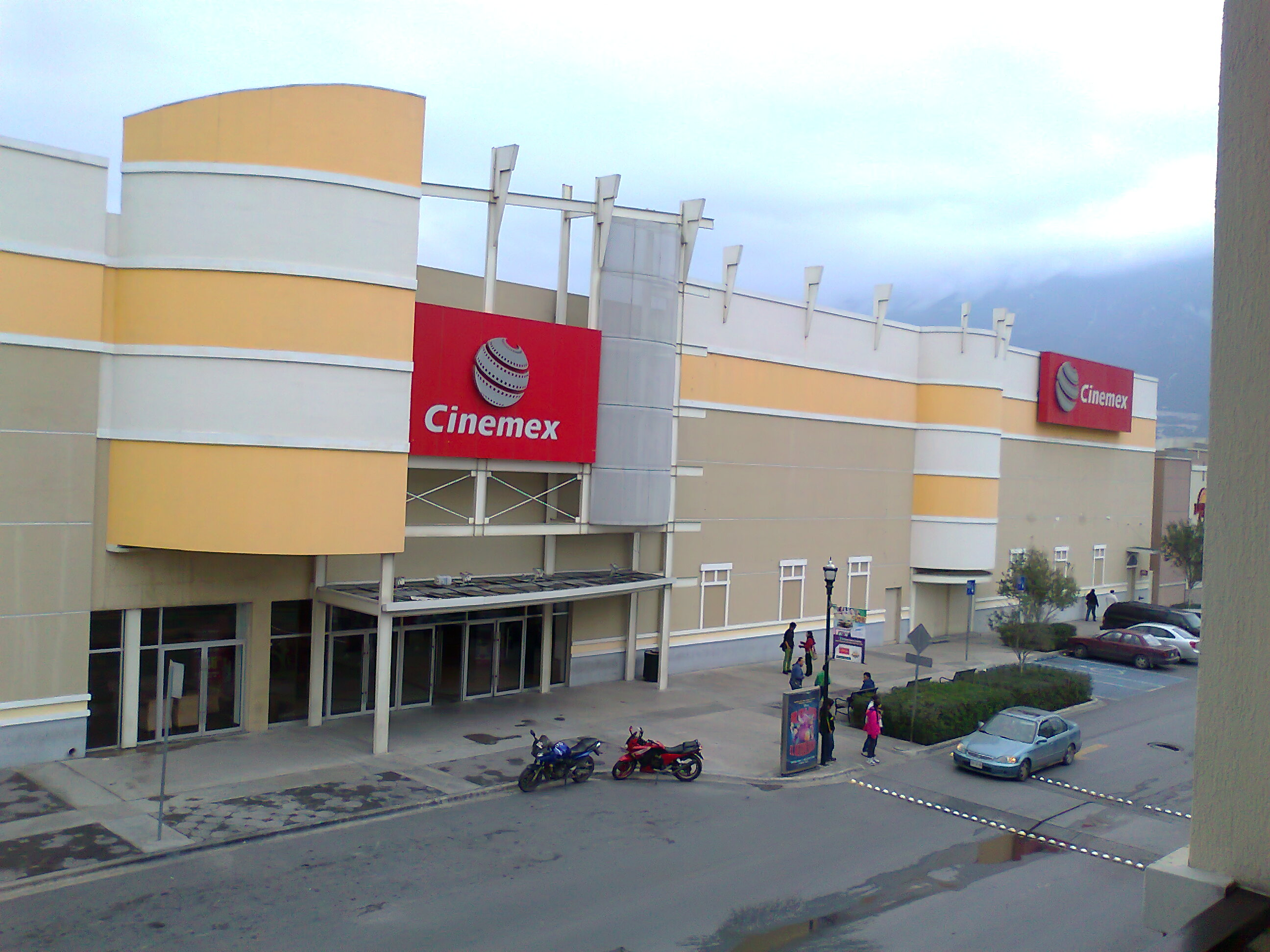
- A Cinemex cinema in Santa Catarina, Nuevo León
- Trade name: Cinemex
- Company type: Sociedad Anónima de Capital Variable
- Industry: Entertainment
- Founded: 1993; 33 years ago
- Founder: Miguel Ángel Dávila; Adolfo Fastlicht; Matthew Heyman
- Headquarters: Mexico City, Mexico
- Website: www.cinemex.com CMX Cinemas (USA)

Cadena Mexicana de Exhibición S.A. de C.V., commonly referred to as Cinemex, is a Mexican chain of cinemas. It operates multiplexes in Mexican cities such as Mexico City, Guadalajara, Monterrey, Toluca, Juarez, Leon, Tijuana, Mexicali, Puebla, Hermosillo, etc.

In 2015, Cinemex began to expand into the United States under the banner CMX. It initially focused on cinemas with premium amenities; in 2017, this division expanded via its acquisition of Cobb Theatres, making it the eighth-largest U.S. cinema chain.

== History ==
Logo used until 2024

Cinemex started with a college business plan. Adolfo Fastlicht, Miguel Angel Dávila Guzmán and Matthew Heyman speculated that Mexico was ready for larger movie theaters. When the regulations were lifted with the new Cinematography Law passed in Mexico in 1992, Adolfo Fastlicht and Miguel Angel Dávila decided that Mexico City offered a market for a high-end chain of theaters.

In 1994, they secured $21.5m in equity financing from JPMorgan Partners and a partnership of the Bluhm family of Chicago, CMex Investors.and some Mexican former politicians The deal is generally acknowledged to be the largest venture capital start-up in Mexican history.

Cinemex's first theater was Cinemex Altavista and it opened on August 2, 1995; the second was Unicornio Land opened on September 23, 1996, soon followed by Cinemex Santa Fe, the company's flagship, in October and Cinemex Manacar in January 1997. That same year saw the opening of Cinemex Los Reyes and Cinemex Loreto.

In June 2002, Oaktree Capital Management acquired Cinemex for $250 million. Two years later, it was sold to a partnership of The Carlyle Group, Bain Capital and Spectrum.

Cinemex was acquired by MMCinemas, the second-largest movie theater operator in the country, from AMC Entertainment for $315 million in 2008.

In 2013, Cinemex began to offer MX4D screens at selected locations.

In February 2013, Cinemex announced its intent to acquire the Mexican operations of U.S. cinema chain Cinemark. The sale was approved by regulators in November.

In August 2013, Cinemex reached a 10-year agreement to exclusively use RealD equipment at all of its cinemas.

In 2015, Cinemex and competitor Cinépolis were both fined by the Instituto Nacional Electoral for defying an order to cease screening political advertising from the Ecologist Green Party of Mexico. The party was also fined.

== U.S. operations ==
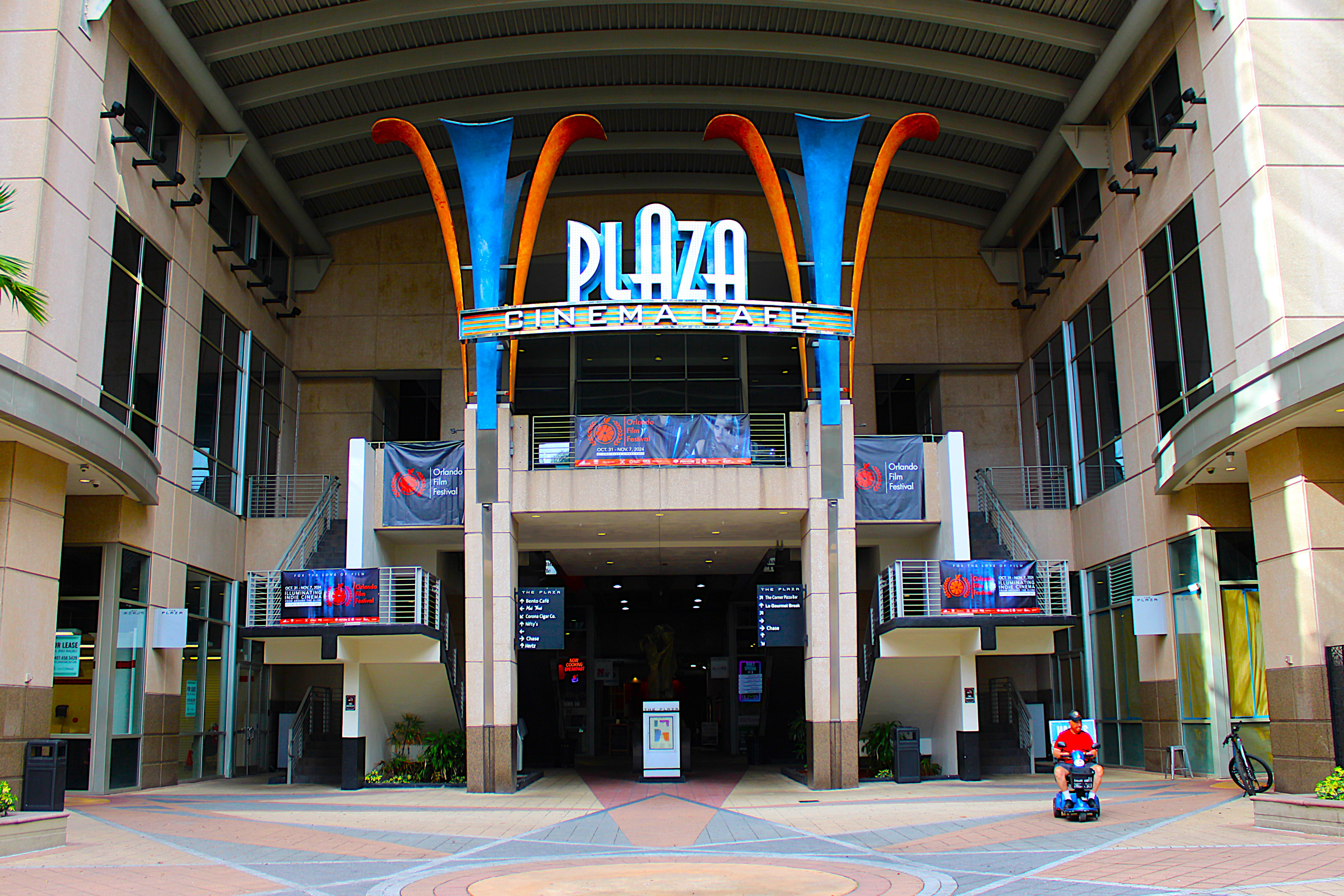
A CMX cinema in Orlando, Florida

In 2015, Cinemex announced plans to expand into the United States with premium dine-in cinemas, including a location at American Dream in New Jersey. In 2016, it opened its first U.S. location under the banner CMX: The VIP Cinema Experience, at Brickell City Centre in Miami. In October 2017, Cinemex announced its intent to acquire Cobb Theatres via the CMX Cinemas subsidiary, which made it the eighth-largest U.S. cinema chain with 30 locations.

On March 16, 2020, CMX agreed to acquire 10 theatres and one under development from Star Cinema Grill. However, its Star Cinema Grill owner Omar Khan filed a lawsuit in April alleging that CMX breached its contract by refusing to close the deal by March 26 because of the COVID-19 pandemic. CMX filed for Chapter 11 bankruptcy protection on April 25 due to the pandemic; CMX shuttered 10 underperforming theatres and was initially unable to renegotiate contracts with creditors such as landlords and movie studios. Following a six-month negotiation with creditors, CMX emerged from bankruptcy in December; landlords agreed to modified revenue-share leases where they will receive part of the theatres' profits.

On July 1, 2025, CMX Cinemas filed for Chapter 11 bankruptcy for the second time in five years, listing assets between $100,000 and $500,000 and liabilities less than $50,000. As a result, the company is looking to either sell assets or close some of its remaining locations.

=== Locations ===
Name	City	Opening date
CMX Pinnacle 14	Gulf Shores, Alabama	July 22, 2005
CMX Hollywood 16 & IMAX	Tuscaloosa, Alabama	November 5, 2004
CMX Lakeside Village 18 & IMAX	Lakeland, Florida	December 22, 2005
CMX Merritt Square 16 & IMAX	Merritt Island, Florida	May 21, 2004
CMX Dolphin 19 & IMAX	Miami, Florida	May 25, 2001
CMX Miami Lakes 17	Miami Lakes, Florida	June 29, 2000
CMX Downtown In The Gardens	Palm Beach Gardens, Florida	November 23, 2005
CMX CinéBistro Hyde Park	Tampa, Florida	October 16, 2009
CMX Grand 10	Winter Haven, Florida	November 15, 2002
CMX CinéBistro Stony Point	Richmond, Virginia	October 22, 2010
CMX Plaza Café 12	Orlando, Florida	December 12, 2010
CMX Village 14	Leesburg, Virginia	July 23, 2011
CMX Countryside	Clearwater, Florida	December 16, 2011
CinéBistro Waverly Place	Cary, North Carolina	September 4, 2015
CMX CinéBistro and CMX Liberty	Liberty Township, Butler County, Ohio	November 5, 2015
CMX CinéBistro Siesta Key	Sarasota, Florida	February 12, 2016
CMX Tyrone 10	St. Petersburg, Florida	April 15, 2016
CMX Daytona 12	Daytona Beach, Florida	December 12, 2016
CMX Wellington	Wellington, Florida	December 15, 2016
CMX CinéBistro CityPlace Doral	Doral, Florida	March 17, 2017
CMX Brickell Dine-In	Miami, Florida	April 2017
CMX Market Cinemas Closter	Closter, New Jersey	January 2018
CMX Fallschase	Tallahassee, Florida	July 27, 2018
CinéBistro Peachtree Corners	Peachtree Corners, Georgia	March 8, 2019
CMX CinéBistro Halcyon	Alpharetta, Georgia	September 27, 2019
CMX CinéBistro Tysons Galleria	McLean, Virginia	January 27, 2023
