= Ster Cinemas =

Movie theater chain in Greece

- Type: Subsidiary
- Industry: Cinema entertainment
- Founded: 2004
- Headquarters: Athens, Greece
- Products: Cinemas
- Net income: ▲€10.6 million (2015)
- Number of employees: 500 (2014)
- Parent: Ster Century Cinemas
- Website: www.stercinemas.gr

Ster Cinemas S.A. was a Greek chain of cinemas. It had sites across Greece.

== The company ==
Ster Cinemas was a Greek company, a subsidiary of Audio Visual Enterprises S.A. (Vardinogiannis group of companies) as part of a partnership with Ster Century. The Ster Cinemas group operated near large Greek urban centres (Athens, Thessaloniki, Patras, Larissa and Chania), and was a Greek version of the Ster Century cinema chain.

== Sites ==
Cinemas that operated under the Ster Cinemas brand before being renamed included:

=== Greece ===
- Ster Ilion in Ilion Athens 8 screens & 1 Summer (1 3D)
- Ster Macedonia in Thessaloniki 11 screens (2 3D)
- Ster Pantheon Plaza in Larissa 3 screens (1 3D)
- Ster Veso Mare in Patras 8 screens (2 3D)
- Ster Mega Place in Chania, Greece 3 screens (1 3D)

Ster Cinemas also operated the following sites, until they were sold to Cineplexx International in 2011.

=== Montenegro ===
- Ster Montenegro, 5 screens (closed, now Cineplexx)

=== Serbia ===
- Ster Cinemas Beograd, 7 screens
