= Ruyi Film =

Chinese cinema operator and film business

Ruyi Film Entertainment Company Limited

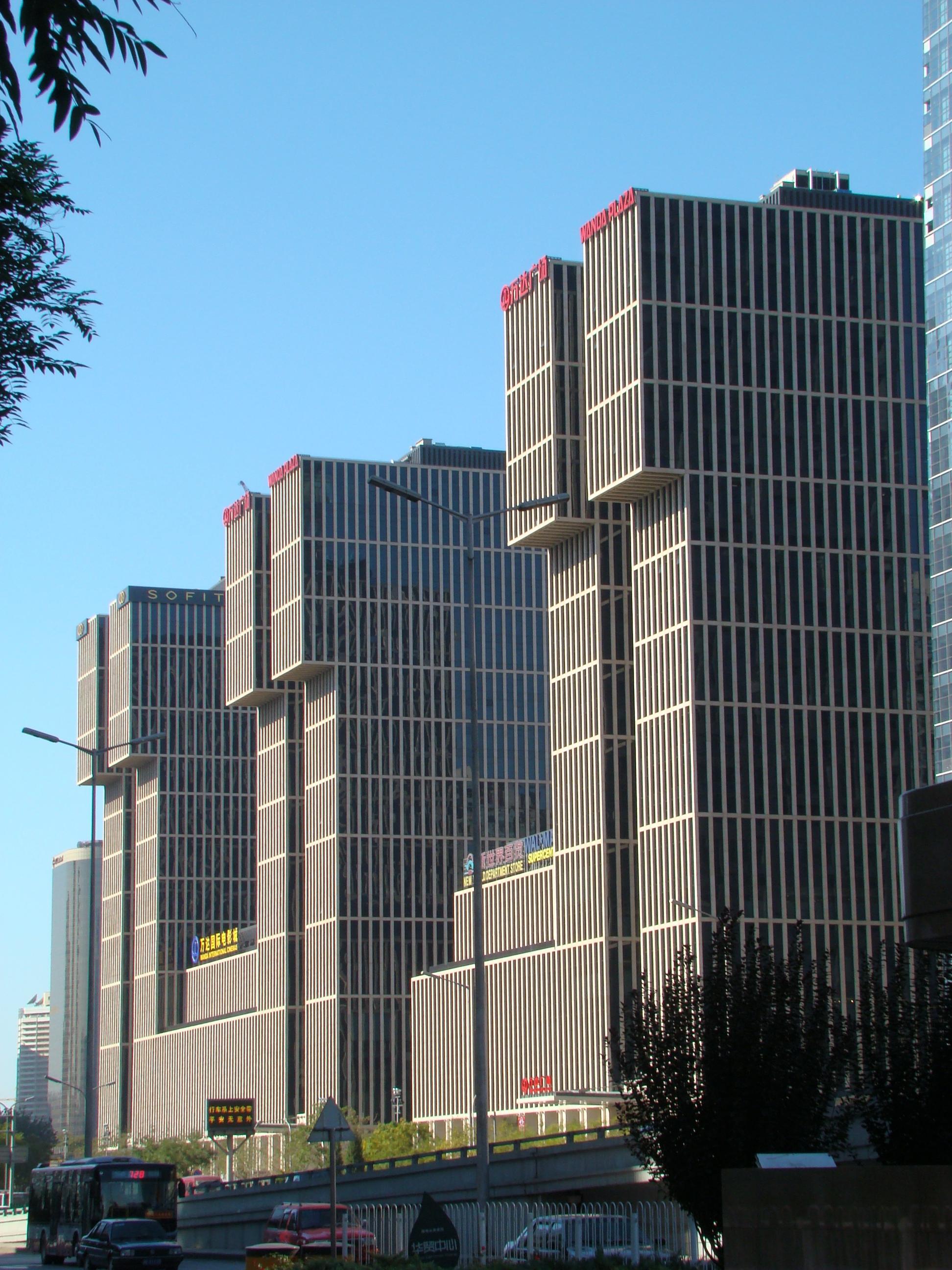
- Former headquarters at Beijing CBD Wanda Plaza
- Native name: 儒意电影娱乐股份有限公司
- Formerly: Wanda Cinema Line Corporation; Wanda Film Holding Co., Ltd.
- Type: Public
- Traded as: SZSE: 002739
- Industry: Entertainment (cinemas)
- Founded: 2005; 21 years ago
- Headquarters: Beijing, China
- Key people: Chen Xi (chair)
- Products: Wanda Cinemas
- Parent: China Ruyi (51%)
- Subsidiaries: Hoyts
- Website: www.ruyifilm.com

Ruyi Film Entertainment Company Limited (formerly Wanda Film, Wanda Cinema Line) is a cinema operator, film production and film distribution company in China, headquartered in Chaoyang District, Beijing. It is a part of the Dalian Wanda Group. As of 2014 Wang Jianlin is the head of the company. As of January 2018, Ruyi Film remained China's largest film distributor. Some locations are named Wanda Cinemas (Chinese: 万达影城; pinyin: Wàndá Yǐngchéng) with Western and Chinese movies as the main offering.

As of December 2025, Ruyi Film had 714 cinemas with 6179 screens worldwide. The revenue in 2017 is 13.2 billion yuan.

== History ==
Wanda Cinema Line was founded in 2005.

In 2014 the company had 4.2 billion yuan ($681.7 million) in box office revenue, the highest grossing in China. In 2014 the China Securities Regulatory Commission gave approval for the company's IPO. In 2015 it was again the largest cinema chain by box office gross, with US$945 million, representing 14% of the market.

As of 2014, the company had a total of 1,616 screens, including 94 IMAX screens, in 182 cinema complexes in almost 100 cities in China, making it the largest movie theater operator in Asia. As of December 2015, the number of screens has since risen to an estimated 2,000 screens.

In March 2016, Dalian Wanda announced it would integrate its domestic film production subsidiary Wanda Pictures and its Qingdao Wanda Pictures unit into Wanda Cinema Line.

In June 2015, Wanda Cinemas announced that it had acquired Australian cinema chain Hoyts. On July 27, 2016, the company announced it would acquire film website Mtime.

In 2016, the total box office of Wanda Cinema is 7.6 billion RMB, with a 20.5% increasing.

In March 2017, Wanda Cinema Line was renamed Wanda Film Holding.

As of April 2017, Wanda Cinema remained China's largest film distributor. The Financial Times reported on April 1, 2017, that Wanda Cinema had "reported a 7.5 per cent year-on-year increase in annual net profit."

In November 2017, Wanda Cinemas won the 2017 "China Top 100 Enterprises Award".

On February 5, 2018, Wanda Group signed a strategic investment agreement with Alibaba Group and Cultural Investment Holdings. The two parties will invest 7.8 billion yuan for Wanda Film Holding's 12.77% stake. Of which, Alibaba invests 4.68 billion yuan and CIS invests 3.12 billion yuan, becoming the second and third largest shareholders after transaction. Wanda Group remains the controlling shareholder with 48.09% of shares in Wanda Film.

On June 25, 2018, Wanda has unveiled plans to consolidate its film and entertainment businesses with the aim of boosting production of films, television and games. In a company notice issued to the Shenzhen Stock Exchange, Wanda Film Holdings, a subsidiary of Dalian Wanda Group, said it plans to acquire a 96.83% stake of Wanda Media from the company's 21 shareholders at a price of 11.6 billion yuan ($1.77 billion) via cash payment and share issue.

In December 2023, Wanda have agreed to sell 51% share of Wanda Film to China Ruyi Holdings. The company was renamed Ruyi Film in April 2026, while its cinema chain, Wanda Cinemas, remain the original name.

== Facilities and operations ==
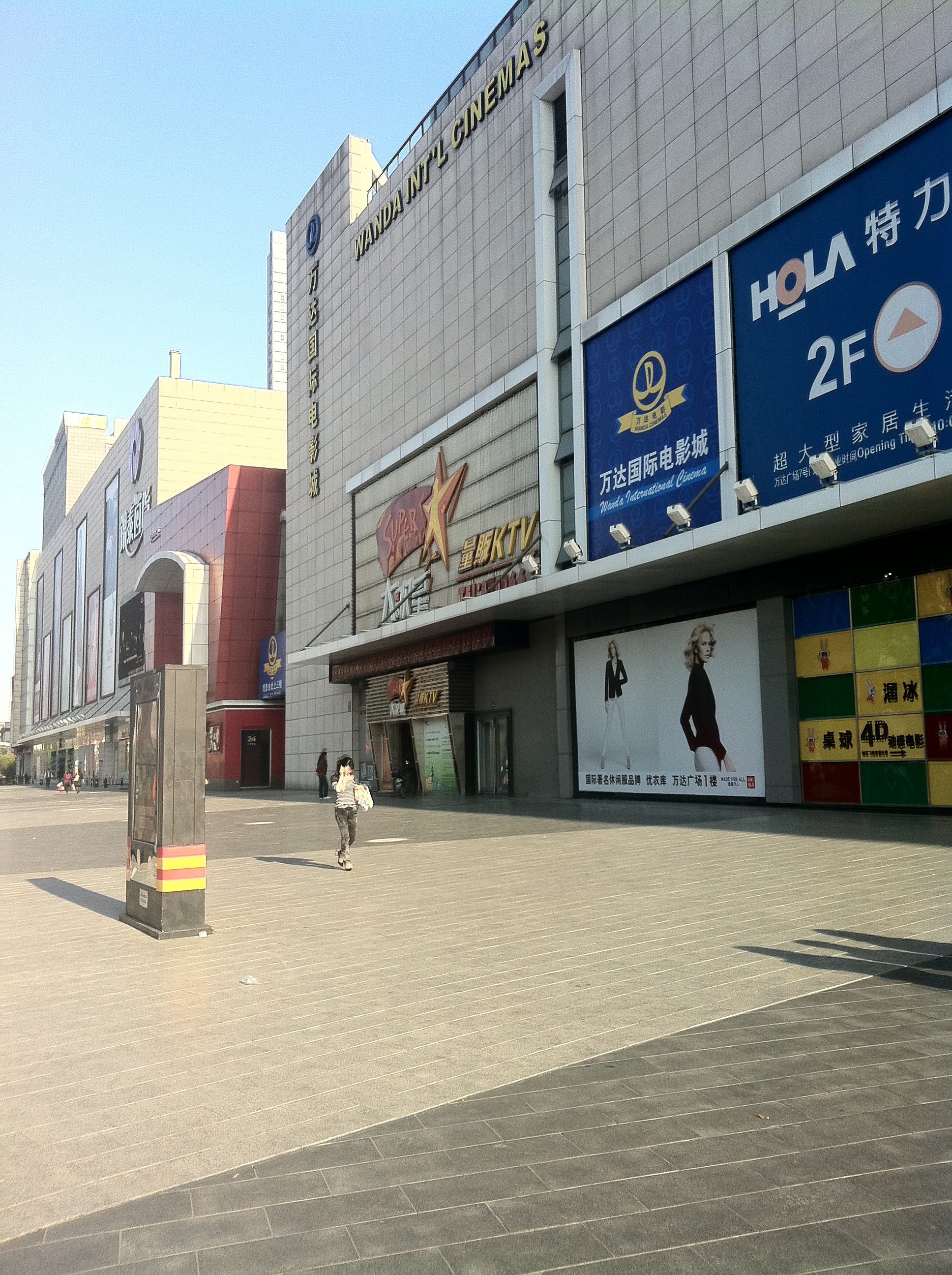
Wanda International Cinema in Yinzhou District, Ningbo

Ruyi Film is headquartered in Chaoyang District, Beijing. Beijing CBD Wanda Plaza includes the Beijing CBD Wanda Cinemas (北京万达电影城CBD店).

Some locations are named Wanda Cinemas. As of 2016, it has a total of 2,789 screens in 320 theaters in China, Australia and New Zealand. As of June 2016, it was the largest exhibitor in China, with 2,700 screens in 311 theaters.

In 2018, Shanghai Wujiaochang Wanda Cinema introduced the very first LED cinema screen in China. The LED cinema screen has a width of nearly 10.3 meters, ultra-clear 4K resolution, with its peak brightness 10 times higher than traditional projection equipment.

== See also ==
- List of cinema and movie theater chains
