= MMCinemas =

Mexican movie theater operator

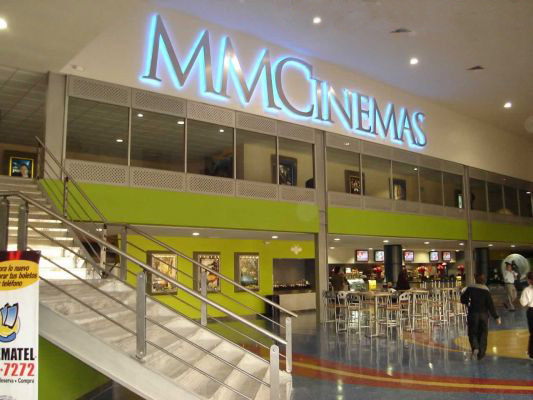
MMCinemas

MMCinemas was a cineplex company based in Monterrey, Mexico. It operated 87 cineplexes, primarily in northern Mexico, with more than 900 screens at the time of its merger with Cinemex in 2008.

== History ==
MMCinemas was established in 1981 by Grupo Multimedios, a Monterrey-based broadcasting company, when the company opened its first movie theater in that city. By 1994, the chain owned 14 multiplexes with a total of 47 screens in northern Mexico.

In 2006, Multimedios sold MMCinemas to Latin America Movie Theatres (LAMT), a joint venture of private equity firm Southern Cross Group and Morgan Stanley.

In February 2008, Germán Larrea Mota Velasco, owner of Grupo México, reached an agreement to acquire 80 percent of LAMT through holding company Entretenimiento GM de México. At the time, MMCinemas operated 50 cineplexes with 804 screens in 22 states, primarily Nuevo León, Tamaulipas and Sonora, but with little presence in the Mexico City metropolitan area. Nine months later, Entretenimiento GM purchased the 493 screens of Cinemex from AMC Entertainment in a $315 million transaction that gave the company access to the Mexico City market. The combination would have a market share of more than 30 percent, second only to Cinépolis. Most MMCinemas locations were converted to the Cinemex brand.
