= Universe Cineplex =

Universe Cineplex (also known as Universal Cineplex) is a cinema chain in Karachi, Pakistan. It was established in September 2003 at Seaview. It operates five multiplex type cinemas. The cinema only allows entry for families, with single males not permitted.

== Criticism ==
In 2010, Universe Cineplex allegedly showed pirated copies of Milenge Milenge and Knight and Day in the cinema.
