= Cineplexx (musician) =

Argentine singer

- Born: Sebastian Litmanovich
- Origin: Buenos Aires, Argentina
- Genres: Pop, ambient, Latin
- Years active: 1997–present
- Labels: Cherry Red Records, Portia Records, Molecula Records, Universal Records Philippines
- Website: Official website for Cineplexx

Cineplexx is an electronic musician from Argentina. He has released twelve albums.

== Biography ==
Sebastian Litmanovich was born March 13, 1973, in Buenos Aires. He is a graphic artist and musician who currently lives in London. His influences run from The Velvet Underground to ABBA.

In 1998, after playing in a few bands, Litmanovich founded Cineplexx. His first release, Posología, appeared through Caipirinha; an experimental electronic label based in NY. It was followed by the self released album Electrocardiograma in 2003, which was re-released by Cherry Red in 2010.

Soon thereafter, Cineplexx began playing shows - in Argentina, New York and Tokyo. He appeared at the Lowlands Festival in the Netherlands and the Sonar Festival in Barcelona. For four years he played around Europe and Asia both as Cineplexx and as part of the audio-visual duo, Cacahuetes Inc. In 2006 Federico Aubele invited him to join his band on a European Tour.

In 2008, Cineplexx recorded Picnic, enlisting the help of friends Duglas Stewart (BMX Bandits), Norman Blake (Teenage Fanclub), Jad Fair and Federico Aubele.

In 2014, he released the album Florianopolis through Nuevahola Records. Moved from London to Madrid where he joined the band Papaya as producer and member. With Papaya he played all festivals including Womad, FIB, and many more, also received awards for "new band" from Ojo Critico (RNE) and Premios Popeye.

In 2018 he joined the famous radio show Hoy Empieza Todo at Radio 3 (RTVE) as collaborator doing his segment Latineando Con Cineplexx for 5 years. After that he made a weekly podcast for the same radio called "Latineando", all about Latin music from 60s, 70s and 80s.

He also made some albums under diverse alias such as Amarena Incident (a post rock band from 1997), Readme & Anthony (a collage electronic band), Portatile Room Mobile (a cover band together with Leumann.net), Cacahuetes Inc. (a fake documentary producer with aBe), Cosmic Nuit (2020), Monte Noni (2024) and also have some collaborations with Jad Fair, Daniel Melero, La Bien Querida, Solea Morente, Kela, Enrique Iglesias, Vanessa Zamora, Sabina Odone, Madame Recamier, Glaznost, Leumann, Sebastian Kramer, Wevie Stonder, Jaime sin Tierra, Giradioses, jackson souvenirs, aBe (bcn), Lupe Nuñez (of Pipas & Amor de Dias), Cathy Claret, Duglas Stewart (Bmx Bandits) & Norman Blake (Teenage Fanclub).

== Discography ==
=== Albums ===
- Azul Es El Rumor (2026, Nuevahola Records)
- Pura Fantasia (2023, Nuevahola Records)
- Solo Olas (2019, Nacional Records)
- Espejos (2016)
- Florianopolis (2014)
- Perfume (2012)
- Picnic (2008)
- Restar (2006)
- Pequeños Accidentes Domésticos (2004)
- Electrocardiograma (2003 )
- Capacidad Maxima: 1 Persona (2003)
- Posología (1999)

==== Compilation ====
- Nuevahola (Compilation CD 2010, Cherry Red Records)

==== Live ====
- Dublab Session (2007)

==== EP ====
- Pequeños Accidentes Domesticos (2003)
