= Royal Films =

Colombian movie theater chain

Royal Films S.A.S.

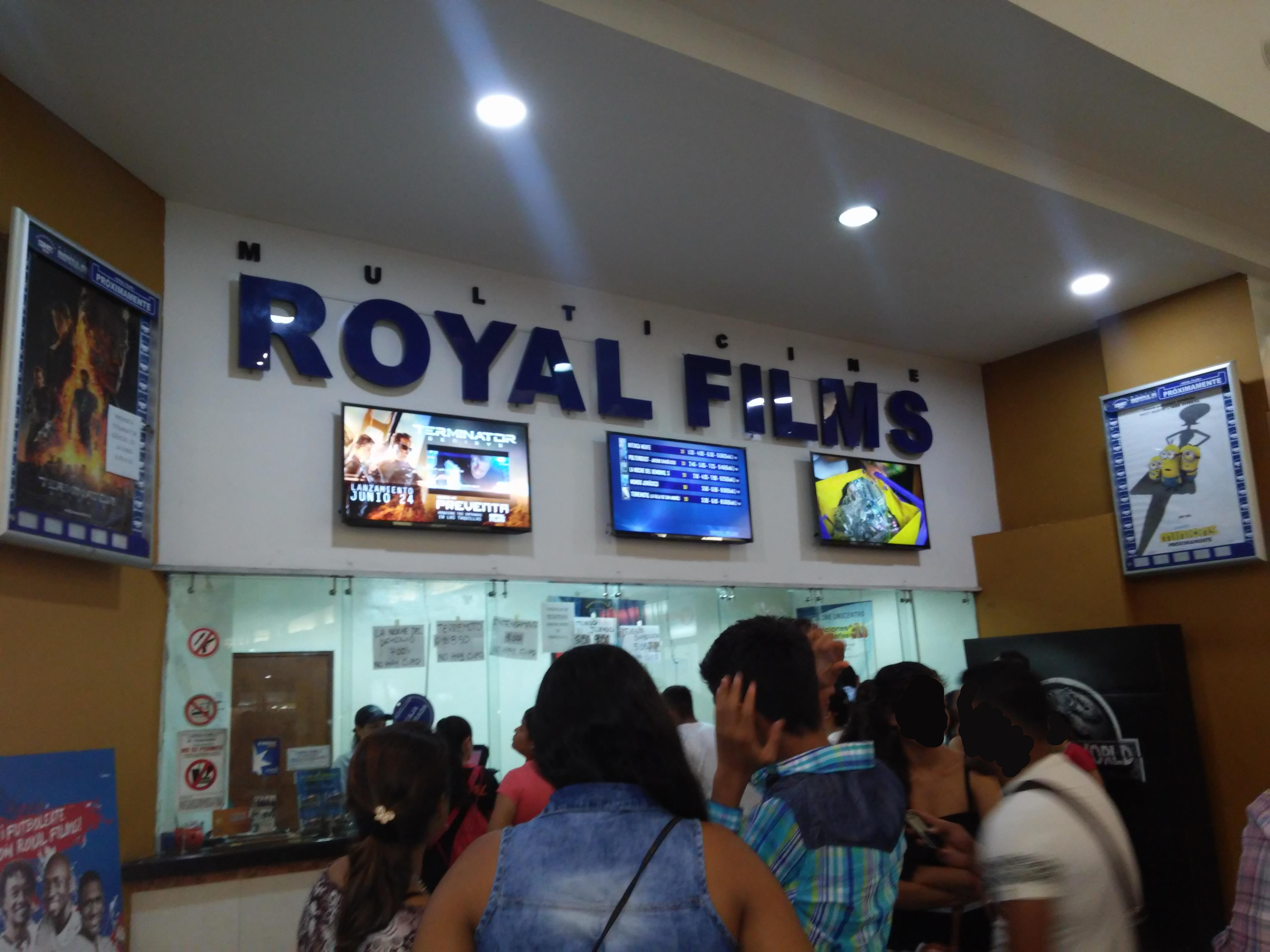
- A box office in Cúcuta
- Trade name: Royal Films
- Industry: Entertainment
- Founded: 1974; 52 years ago
- Founder: Abraham Osman
- Headquarters: Barranquilla, Colombia
- Website: www.cinemasroyalfilms.com

Royal Films is a privately-owned Colombian movie theater chain in Barranquilla.

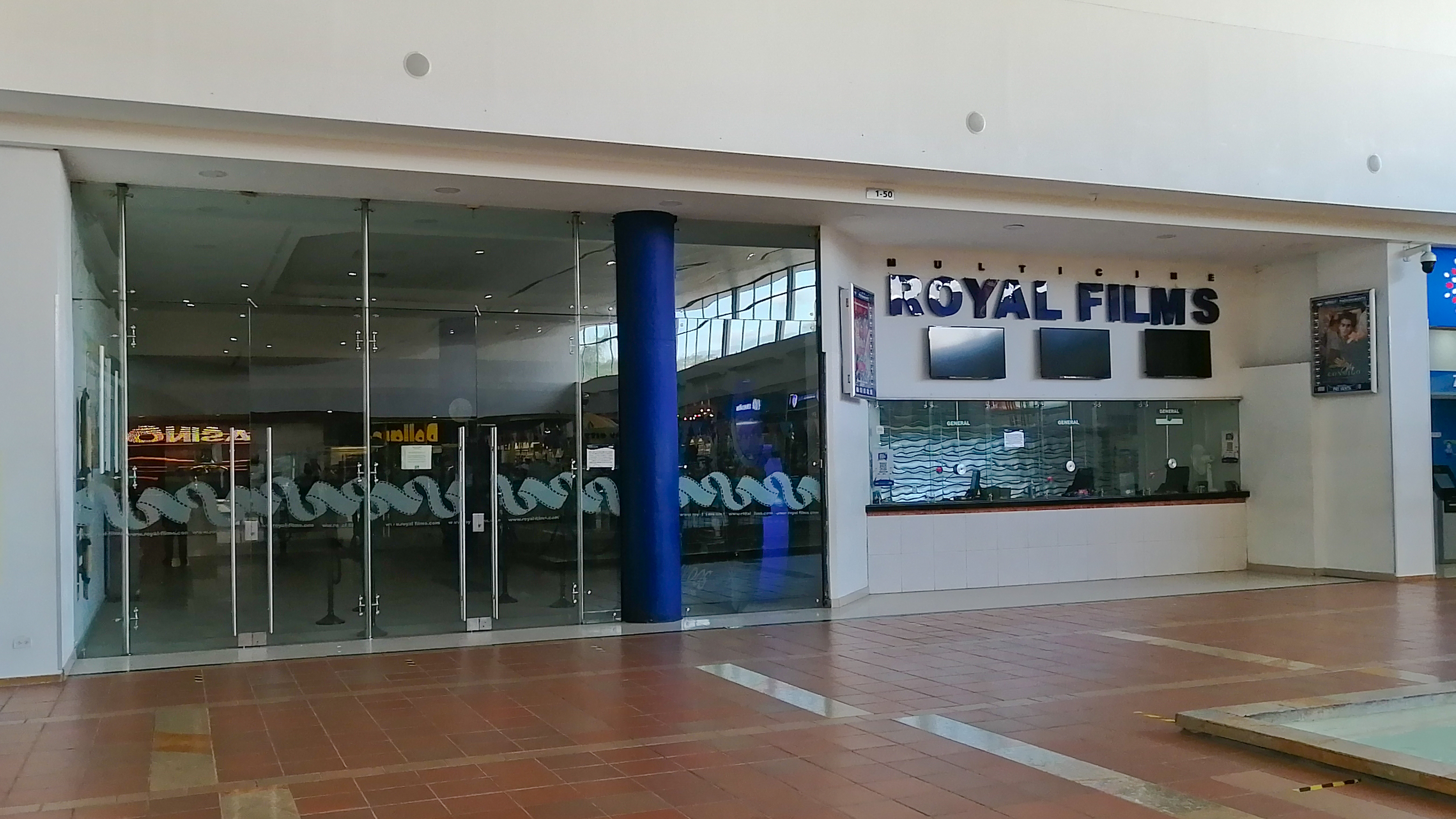
A Royal Film theater in Cúcuta.

The chain was founded in 1974 by three businessmen from the city of Maicao who raised the necessary investments to open the first cinema in the region. As of July 2017, it has locations in 29 cities across the country and has 54 complexes, 60,000 seats, and more than 236 screens. It has 4DX theaters, Ultra Dolby Atmos theaters, VIP theaters, making it the largest cinema company in Colombia.

On October 25, 2024, to celebrate its 50th anniversary, it offered free admission to all its screenings.
