= Odessa Kino =

Ukrainian cinema chain

- Type: Joint-stock company
- Industry: Entertainment
- Founded: 1999
- Founder: Artem Vozniuk
- Headquarters: Odesa, Ukraine
- Website: www.kinoodessa.com

Odessa Kino are a chain of multiplex cinemas based in Ukraine.

== Origins ==
The first cinema in the chain was the Rodina Cinema in Odesa, which was established in 1999. Cinemas in other cities and towns were then added to the newly formed group over the next few years.

== Locations ==
Odessa Cinemas currently have 6 cinema complexes throughout Ukraine:

- Odesa
  - Moskva (1 screen)
  - Rodina (2 screens)
- Dnipro Kinostancia (4 screens)
- Kryvyi Rih Union (4 screens)
- Kyiv
  - Karavan (4 screens)
  - Ukraina (4 screens)
