= Multikino =

Polish multinational cinema chain

Multikino SA
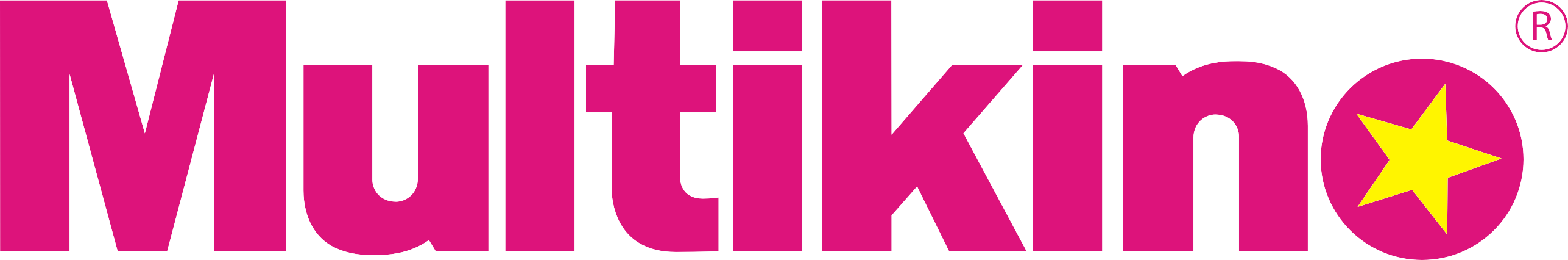
- Company type: Joint stock company
- Industry: Cinemas
- Founded: 1998
- Headquarters: Warsaw, Poland
- Key people: Pawel Swist; General Director
- Revenue: Unknown
- Number of employees: ~1000
- Parent: Vue International
- Website: www.multikino.pl

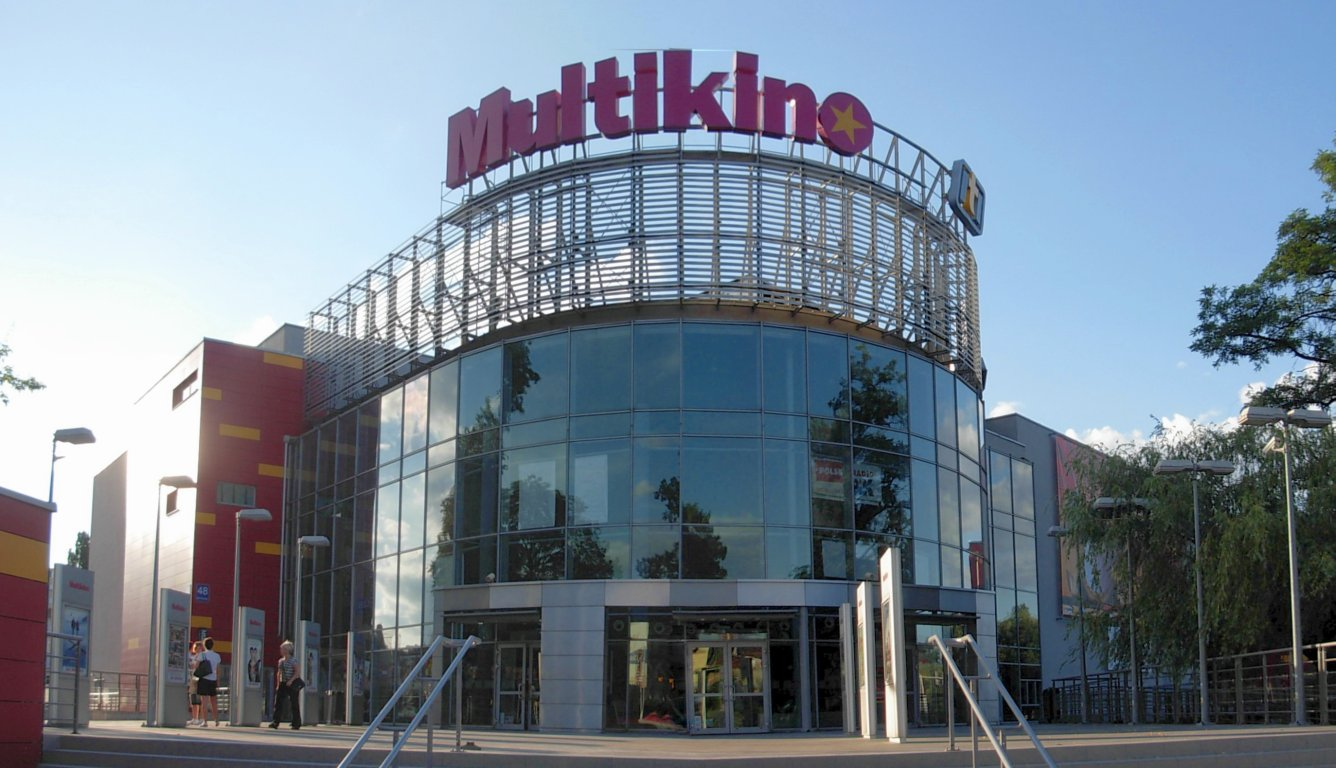
Multikino in Bydgoszcz

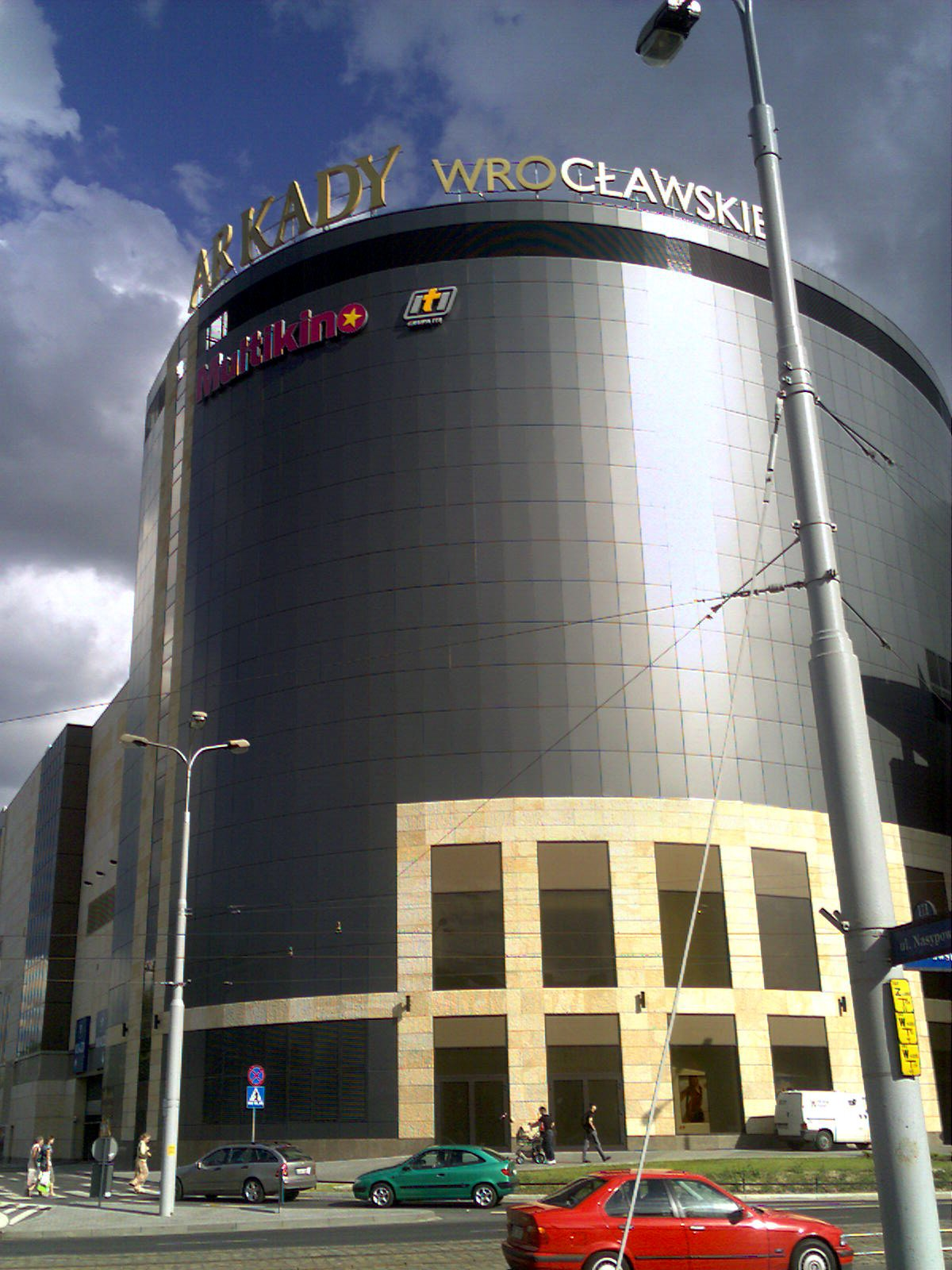
Multikino in Arkady Wrocławskie, Wrocław

Multikino is the second largest multiplex chain in Poland. It was responsible for opening the nation's first multiplex, located in Poznań. It is owned by Vue International, and the brand name also applies to cinemas in Lithuania.

== History ==
The company started its operation in 1995 as joint venture between ITI Cinema and British UCI. In 2003 ITI bought the UCI shares and owned the company until 2013.

As Multikino was the first company to run multiplex cinemas in Poland, the term multikino is often used as a description of multiplex cinema. The situation resembles the one with Sony's Walkman, when it is used as a description for portable CC player, despite it being a registered trademark.

In February 2008 it was announced that Multikino would merge with its second largest rival, Silver Screen. Once the transaction was complete, Multikino operated 19 cinemas with 174 screens in 13 Polish cities. There were also plans to enter the Ukrainian market, but due to global crisis it has never happened.

In August 2008, Multikino have installed digital projectors in each cinema. That allows viewing of 3D movies in Dolby 3D Digital Cinema.

In 2010, Multikino opened the first cinema network outside Polish borders in Riga - Latvia (August 2010) and in Vilnius - Lithuania (September 2010).

In May 2013, Vue Entertainment acquired Polish Multikino. The acquisition was completed in October 2013.

In May 2020, during the COVID-19 pandemic, Riga location of Multikino closed. Reasoning for the closure was never provided.

== Locations ==
#	Location	Country	No. of screens
1	Bydgoszcz	Poland	10 screens
2	Elbląg	Poland	6 screens
3	Gdańsk	Poland	10 screens
4	Gdynia	Poland	8 screens
5	Katowice	Poland	9 screens
6	Koszalin	Poland	6 screens
7	Kraków	Poland	12 screens
8	Łódź	Poland	10 screens
9	Poznań (Multikino 51)	Poland	8 screens
10	Poznań (Stary Browar)	Poland	8 screens
11	Poznań (Galeria Malta)	Poland	10 screens included 3 Platinum screens
12	Radom (Galeria Słoneczna)	Poland	6 screens
13	Rumia	Poland	5 screens
14	Rybnik	Poland	7 screens
16	Sopot	Poland	6 screens
17	Szczecin	Poland	9 screens
18	Tychy	Poland	5 screens
19	Vilnius (OZAS Gallery)	Lithuania	7 screens
20	Warsaw (Ursynów)	Poland	12 screens
21	Warsaw (Złote Tarasy)	Poland	8 screens
22	Warsaw (Wola Park)	Poland	6 screens
23	Warsaw (Targówek)	Poland	12 screens
24	Włocławek	Poland	6 screens
25	Wrocław (Arkady)	Poland	10 screens
26	Wrocław (Pasaż Grunwaldzki)	Poland	11 screens
27	Zabrze	Poland	13 screens
28	Zgorzelec	Poland	
