= DHA Cinema =

Cinema in Lahore, Pakistan

DHA Cinema (or Defence Housing Authority Cinema) is a cinema in Lahore, Pakistan. It is located in Lalak Jan Chowk R Block Phase 2 DHA, running by DHA administration.
