= Mann Theatres (Minnesota) =

Mann Theatres is an American movie theater chain operating in the state of Minnesota with 13 theatres and 86 screens. It was founded in 1935, around the same time that Ted Mann was getting into the business, in St. Paul. This chain was started in 1970 by Marvin Mann, Ted Mann's brother, through the purchase of Highland and Grandview theaters in St. Paul. Following Marvin Mann's death in 1994, his sons Benjie and Stephen took over the business. Stephen Mann's daughter Michelle later became a co-owner.
