= PVS Film City =

- Type: Private
- Industry: Entertainment
- Founded: April 2011
- Headquarters: Tanur, Malappuram, India
- Number of locations: 5
- Area served: India
- Key people: Sadasivan Nataraj(Director)
- Parent: P.V Sadasiva Cinema Pvt. Ltd.
- Website: www.filmcityticket.com=

PVS Film City is a regional multiplex chain in the state of Kerala, India. Registered under P.V. Sadasiva Cinema Private Limited, the company has been into entertainment industry since 2011. The PVS Film City is involved in Motion picture, radio, television and other entertainment activities. It was the first Multiplex in Malabar with 6 screens when opened at RP Mall in 2012 which also introduced Active 3D projection for the first time in the state, though it was sold out later to the mall group.
