= Cineplexx Cinemas =

Austrian cinema company

Cineplexx
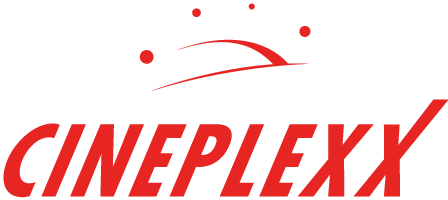
- Type: GmbH
- Industry: Entertainment (movie theatres)
- Founded: 1993
- Headquarters: Vienna, Austria
- Number of locations: 61 (2021)
- Area served: Austria, Albania, Bosnia and Herzegovina, Croatia, Greece, Italy, Kosovo, Montenegro, North Macedonia, Romania, Serbia, Slovenia
- Key people: Christian Langhammer
- Revenue: €150 million (2019)
- Number of employees: 1,600 (2019)
- Website: www.cineplexx.at

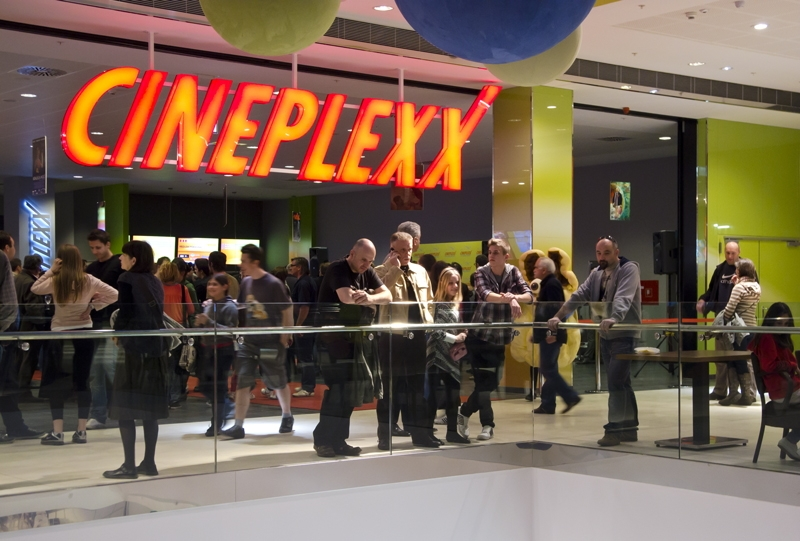
Cineplexx in Zagreb, Croatia

Cineplexx is a cinema company based in Vienna, Austria, owned by Constantin Film-Foundation. The company was founded in 1993, and operates mainly in Austria where it is the largest cinema chain with 28 locations, mostly multiplex cinemas under the Cineplexx brand. The company started international expansion in 2009 and operated 61 multiplexes in 12 countries as of 2021.

== History ==
Cineplexx Kinobetriebe GmbH was founded in 1993 as a joint venture between Constantin Film-Holding GmbH and Vienna's own cinema and event companies (KIBA / Wiener Stadthalle and Wiener Holding AG). The city of Vienna withdrew and sold its shares to Constantin Film-Holding GmbH in spring 1999. Constantin Film-Holding GmbH and Cineplexx Kinobetriebe GmbH are wholly owned by the Langhammer family.

The first Cineplexx cinema was opened on October 31, 1996 in Graz. It was after the Apollo Cinema reopened in December 1993 by Cineinvest, a subsidiary of Constantin Film Holding and Kiba. The largest Cineplexx which was built in November 1999 on the Danube plate, in Reichsbrücke, included 13 halls and 3,400 seats but was closed in 2011.

In March 2001 Cineplexx bought from Loews a cinema in Auhof and in December 2002 the cinema in the Vienna Twin Tower from the German Cinestar. In 2004, Constantin Film Group also took over the multiplex cinema in the Donauzentrum, the Donauplex.

Since 2009 Cineplexx has expanded in Albania, Bosnia and Herzegovina, Croatia, Greece, Italy, Kosovo, Montenegro, North Macedonia, Romania, Serbia and Slovenia.

On May 12, 2009, the first Cineplexx cinema outside Austria was opened in Bolzano, South Tyrol, Italy with 7 screens. Cineplexx acquired Ster Cinemas of Greece in 2011.

In January 2019, Cineplexx bought the three cinemas of the UCI chain in Austria from Odeon.

Cineplexx expanded in Romania in April 2019 after it bought one of the largest multiplexes in Bucharest, Grand Cinema, refurbishing it and changing the name into Cineplexx Baneasa. Three months later Cineplexx took over Cine Globe multiplex in Titan, also in Bucharest, and rebranded it as Cineplexx. In September 2019 a multiplex was opened in Satu Mare. Cineplexx continued to expand with a multiplex in Sibiu in February 2020, in Târgu Mureș in September 2020, and others planned in Craiova and Iași.

The latest addition is the new Cineplexx in Sarajevo with eight cinema halls totaling 1,400 seats, which opened in June 2021 and also serves as a major venue for the annual Sarajevo Film Festival.

Projects under construction were a 4-screen cinema in the ALGO Shopping Center in Algund, near Merano, which was to be opened in summer 2021. Furthermore, the 9-screen cinema at Belgrade Waterfront, which was already open to the public and hosted Serbia's first IMAX, was to be finished in September 2021. Cineplexx's first cinema in Slovenia's capital city Ljubljana with 7 halls and 1400 seats opened in spring 2022 at Supernova Shopping Center in Rudnik.

== Facilities ==
The multiplex offers in selected locations cinema halls equipped with laser 4K projectors, HFR, IMAX, Dolby Atmos and Dolby Cinema.

Since 2017 the company opened the first halls with motion-based cinema concept MX4D in Split, Novi Sad, Belgrade and Graz, with the latest one introduced in Vienna at Cineplexx Millennium City in 2021. Likewise, a VR concept was launched in Graz and Novi Sad on a trial basis. Also Samsung's Onyx concept, the first Cinema LED system to replace the classic projection was installed in Wienerberg.

== Cinemas ==
Name	Location	Screens	Notes
Annenhof Cinema	Graz, Austria	8	
Apollo Cinema	Vienna, Austria	12	IMAX, Laser projection, 4K
Cineplexx Amstetten	Amstetten, Austria	6	Dolby Atmos, All laser projection
Cineplexx Donau Zentrum	Vienna, Austria	13	IMAX, Dolby Atmos, Laser projection, HFR
Cineplexx Graz	Graz, Austria	10	IMAX, Dolby Atmos, MX4D, All laser projection, HFR
Cineplexx Hohenems	Hohenems, Austria	9	IMAX, Dolby Atmos, 4K, HFR
Cineplexx Innsbruck	Innsbruck, Austria	8	IMAX
Cineplexx Lauterach	Lauterach, Austria	4	
Cineplexx Leoben	Leoben Austria	6	
Cineplexx Linz	Linz, Austria	10	Dolby Cinema, Dolby Atmos, All laser projection, 4K, HFR
Cineplexx Mattersburg	Mattersburg, Austria	5	
Cineplexx Millennium City	Vienna, Austria	13	Dolby Cinema, Dolby Atmos, M4DX, All laser projection, 4K, HFR,
Cineplexx Parndorf	Parndorf, Austria	5	Dolby Atmos, All laser projection, 4K, HFR
Cineplexx Salzburg Airport	Salzburg, Austria	10	Dolby Cinema, Dolby Atmos, Laser projection, 4K, HFR
Cineplexx Spittal	Spittal, Austria	4	All laser projection
Cineplexx Villach	Villach, Austria	6	Dolby Atmos, Laser projection, 4K, HFR
Cineplexx Vienna Auhof	Vienna, Austria	8	
Cineplexx Wiener Neustadt	Wiener Neustadt, Austria	8	Dolby Atmos, All laser projection
Cineplexx Wienerberg	Vienna, Austria	10	Onyx Cinema LED, Dolby Atmos, Laser projection, 4K, HFR
Cineplexx Wörgl	Wörgl, Austria	6	Laser projection
SCS Kinowelt	Wiener Neudorf, Austria	9	Dolby Atmos, Laser projection, 4K, HFR
Village Cinema	Vienna, Austria	10	Dolby Cinema, Dolby Atmos, Laser projection, 4K, HFR
Actors Studio	Vienna, Austria	1	
Artis International	Vienna, Austria	1	
Filmtheater Kitzbühel	Kitzbühel, Austria	2	HFR
Geidorf Kunstkino	Graz, Austria	3	
Stadtkino Villach	Villach, Austria	3	
Urania Cinema	Vienna, Austria	1	
Cineplexx QTU	Tirana, Albania	4	Dolby Atmos, 4K, HFR, Laser Projection, 4K
Cineplexx TEG	Tirana, Albania	7	Dolby Atmos, 4K, HFR
Cineplex Palas	Banja Luka, Bosnia and Herzegovina	7	
Cineplexx Plaza Mostar	Mostar, Bosnia and Herzegovina	4	
Cineplexx Sarajevo	Sarajevo, Bosnia and Herzegovina	8	HFR, Ultimate Laser Projection
Cineplexx City Center One East	Zagreb, Croatia	7	HFR
Cineplexx City Center One Split	Split, Croatia	7	HFR, Laser projection
Cineplexx One Salonica	Thessaloniki, Greece	8	IMAX, 4K
Cineplexx Bolzano	Bolzano, South Tyrol, Italy	7	Laser projection, 4K, HFR
Cineplexx ALGO	Lagundo/Merano, South Tyrol, Italy	4	4K, HFR
Cineplexx Prishtina	Prishtina, Kosovo	8	IMAX, Dolby Atmos, 4K, HFR
Cineplexx Prizren	Prizren, Kosovo	5	Dolby Atmos, 4K, HFR
Cineplexx Podgorica	Podgorica, Montenegro	6	HFR
Cineplexx Skopje City Mall	Skopje, North Macedonia	9	HFR
Cineplexx Targu Mures	Targu Mures, Romania	5	HFR, 4K, Atmos, Ultimate Laser Projection
Cineplexx Satu Mare	Satu Mare, Romania	6	HFR, 4K, Ultimate Laser Projection, Atmos
Cineplexx Sibiu	Sibiu, Romania	5	Dolby Atmos, Laser projection, 4K, HFR
Cineplexx Titan	Bucharest, Romania	8	
Cineplexx Băneasa	Bucharest, Romania	13	Dolby Atmos, Laser projection, 4K, HFR
Cineplexx Beo SC	Belgrade, Serbia	8	Dolby Atmos, RealD Ultimate
Cineplexx 4D Delta City	Belgrade, Serbia	6	MX4D, HFR
Cineplexx Big Beograd	Belgrade, Serbia	8	Laser projection, 4K, HFR
Cineplexx Kragujevac Plaza	Kragujevac, Serbia	6	
Cineplexx Nis	Nis, Serbia	5	4K, HFR
Cineplexx Promenada	Novi Sad, Serbia	8	MX4D, All Laser projection, HFR
Cineplexx Usce Shopping Center	Belgrade, Serbia	11	4K, HFR
Cineplexx Galerija Belgrade	Belgrade, Serbia	9	IMAX, Atmos, Ultimate Laser Projection, HFR, 4K
Cineplexx Celje	Celje, Slovenia	8	4K, HFR
Cineplexx Koper	Koper, Slovenia	5	Laser projection
Cineplexx Kranj	Kranj, Slovenia	5	4K, HFR
Cineplexx Ljubljana Rudnik	Ljubljana, Slovenia	7	Dolby Atmos, Laser projection, 4K, HFR
Cineplexx Maribor	Maribor, Slovenia	8	4K, HFR
Cineplexx Murska Sobota	Murska Sobota, Slovenia	3	
Cineplexx Novo Mesto	Novo Mesto, Slovenia	5	
