= Silver Screen (Poland) =

Polish cinema operator

Silver Screen Cinemas was a multiplex cinema operator in Poland. It opened its first theater in Warsaw in 2000.

Silver Screen at its peak operated three cinemas in Warsaw, one in Gdynia and one in Łódź. The latest of the Warsaw cinemas, opened in the beginning of 2004 in the Targówek district, has about 2600 seats divided among twelve screens. It was one of the largest cinemas in Poland.

In February 2008 it was announced that Silver Screen will merge with its rival Multikino. Since then all Silver Screen cinemas have been converted to Multikino brand, except a single one based in Łódź.

== Locations ==
- Puławska (Warsaw) – opened January 2000, 1350 seats + 112 seats in Platinum halls, 5 screens + 3 platinum screens. Closed December 2009
- Gdynia – opened July 29, 2000, 2144 seats, 8 screens
- Łódź – opened January 19, 2001, 1800 seats, 10 screens
- Targówek (Warsaw) – opened November 2003, 2500 seats, 12 screens
- Wola Park (Warsaw) – opened December 2004, 996 seats, 6 screens
