= Odian =

Odian is a surname. Notable people with the name include:

- Krikor Odian (1834-1887), Ottoman Armenian jurist, politician, and writer
- Yervant Odian (1869–1926), Ottoman Armenian satirist, journalist and playwright

== See also ==
- Odean, given name and surname
- Odeon (disambiguation)
- Odia (disambiguation)
