= Dolby Cinema =

Premium cinema screen technology created by Dolby Laboratories

- Website: https://www.dolby.com/movies-tv/cinema

Dolby Cinema is a type of premium large format movie theater designed by Dolby Laboratories that combines Dolby proprietary technologies such as Dolby Vision and Dolby Atmos, as well as other signature entrance and intrinsic design features. The technology competes with IMAX and other premium large formats such as Cinemark XD and Regal's RPX (Regal Premium Experience).

== History ==
The first installations featuring Dolby Cinema were JT (now Vue) Bioscopen Cinema in Eindhoven, Netherlands on December 18, 2014; followed by Cinesa La Maquinista in Barcelona, Spain. Dolby Laboratories has partner contracts with Cinesa, Vue Cinemas, AMC Theatres (known as Dolby Cinema at AMC, formerly Dolby Cinema at AMC Prime until early 2017), Cineplexx Cinemas, Wanda Cinemas, Jackie Chan Cinema, Reel Cinemas and Odeon Cinemas to install Dolby Cinemas.

On May 26, 2017, Dolby announced they made a deal with Pathé Cinémas to open 10 new locations in Europe. Seven will be located in France and three will be located in The Netherlands. By 2024, France will have 12 Dolby Cinema theaters in Pathé cinemas: including 3 in Paris, 1 in Lyon, Toulouse, Nice, Rouen, Rennes, Marseille, and near the Charles de Gaulle Airport.

== Technology ==
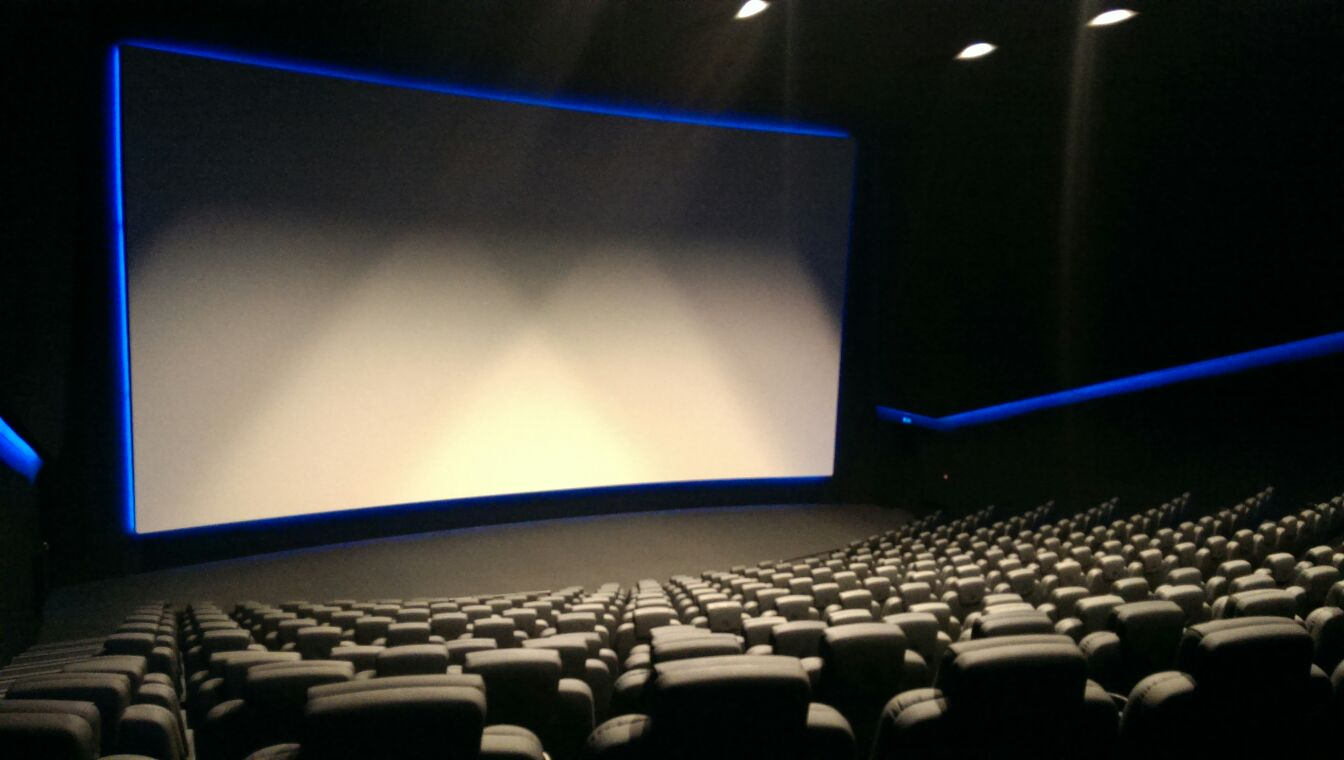
The interior of a typical Dolby Cinema theater located at the Vue Hilversum in Hilversum, Netherlands

=== Dolby Vision ===
Dolby Cinema uses a Dolby Vision projection system developed by Dolby Laboratories in collaboration with Christie Digital. The system consists of dual Christie 4K 6P (primary) modular laser projectors featuring a custom design to allow for unique light path. The system is capable of delivering up to 48 cd/m^{2} on unity-gain matte-white screens for 3D (and up to 106 cd/m^{2} for 2D), a substantial improvement on current generation 3D systems which deliver in the range of 10 to 14 cd/m^{2} for 3D. The result is improved brightness, color, and contrast compared to traditional xenon projectors. The first theaters temporarily used off-the-shelf dual Christie 4K laser projectors until the Dolby Vision-capable ones were shipped out in spring 2015.

Dolby 3D uses spectrum separation, where the two projectors function in stacked operation with each projector emitting a slightly different wavelength of red, green, and blue primary. There is no polarization present on the projector, and the 3D spectacles have notch filters that block the primaries used by the projector projecting the image intended for the other eye.

Dolby Vision is able to display the following combinations of resolution and frame-rate:

- 4K – 2D at 120 Hz, 60 Hz, 48 Hz, and 30 Hz
- 4K – 3D at 120 Hz, 60 Hz, 48 Hz, and 30 Hz per eye/projector
- 2K – 2D at 120 Hz, 60 Hz, 48 Hz, and 30 Hz
- 2K – 3D at 120 Hz, 60 Hz, 48 Hz, and 30 Hz per eye/projector

Although the twin projectors are capable of displaying the 7,500:1 contrast ratio defined by the DCI fixed luminance gamma function, for movies not graded with Dolby Vision, the projectors are limited to 5,000:1 contrast ratio. The Hollywood studios have graded over 100 films directly on Dolby Cinema projectors, the creative team can then create content with contrast ratios of 1,000,000:1.

=== Dolby Atmos ===
Another component of the Dolby Cinema experience is Dolby Atmos, an object-oriented, 3-D immersive surround sound format developed by Dolby Laboratories. The system is capable of 128 simultaneous audio inputs utilizing up to 64 individual speakers to enhance viewer immersion. The first film to support the new format was Disney and Pixar's animated film Brave, released in 2012.

=== Signature entrance ===
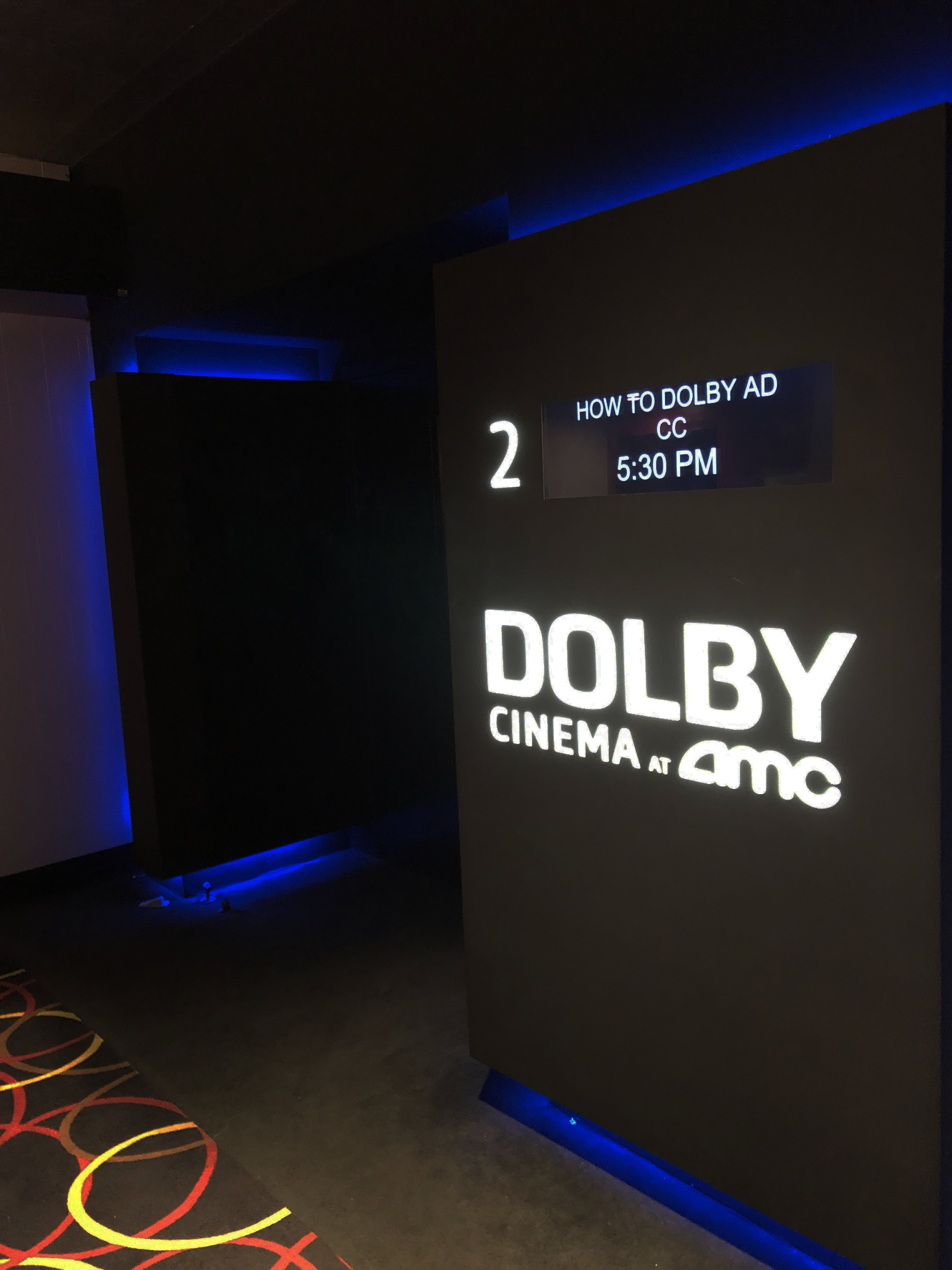
The entrance to a Dolby Cinema theater located at the AMC Barton Creek Square 14 in Austin, Texas, showing a print of How to Train Your Dragon: The Hidden World

Most Dolby Cinema features a curved video wall entrance displaying content related to the feature film playing in the auditorium. The content displayed on the video wall is specifically generated by the film studio and is intended to immerse viewers in the movie experience before the movie starts. The video is generated using multiple short-throw high-definition projectors in the entrance ceiling and proprietary software is used to pixel-map the different images together along the wall. Similarly, the audio is generated using speakers placed in the ceiling of the entrance.

== See also ==
- IMAX
- RealD 3D
