= UGC (cinema operator) =

France-based cinema operator

UGC S.A.
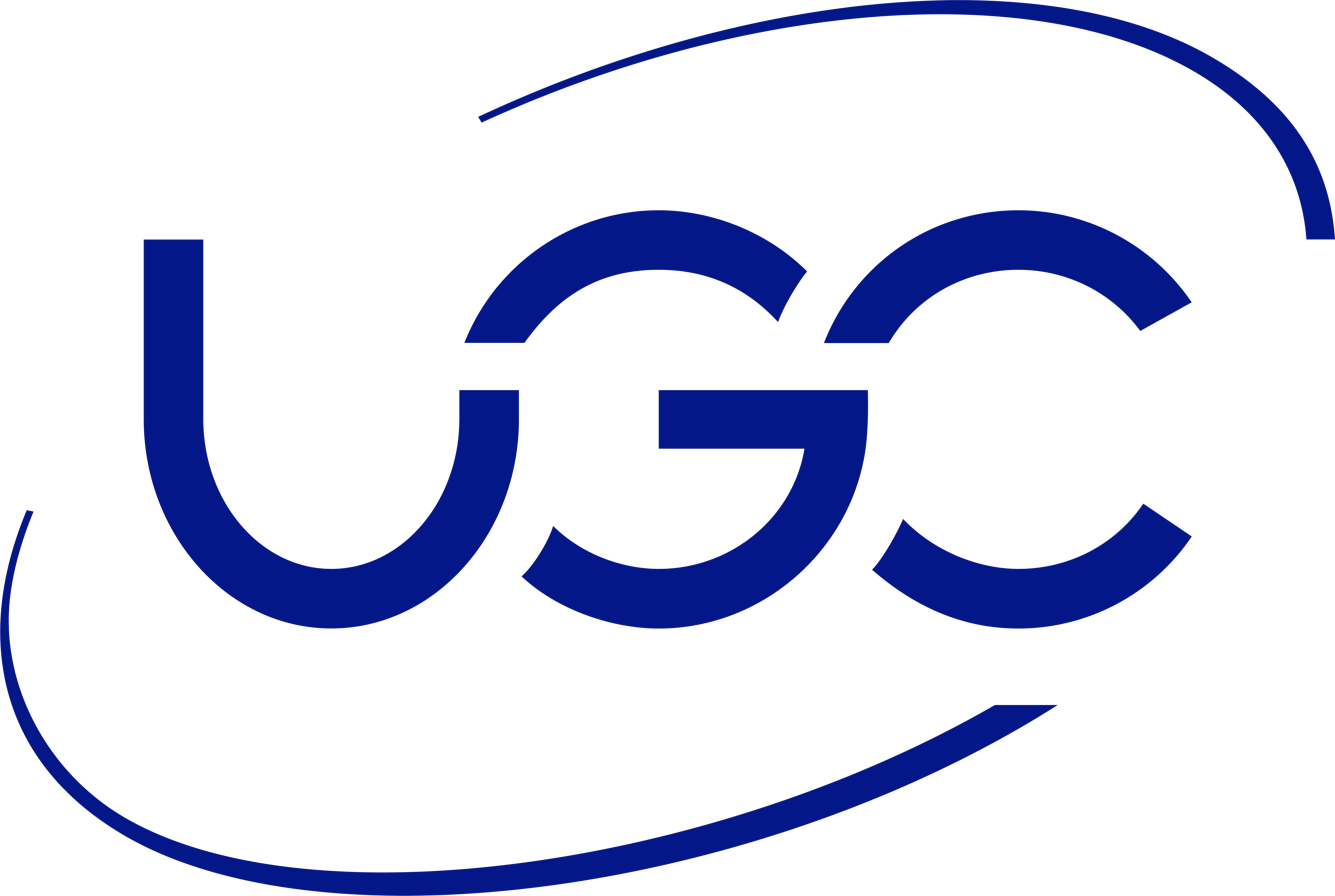
- Formerly: Union Générale Cinématographique (1946–1988)
- Type: Société anonyme (with board of directors)
- Industry: Entertainment
- Predecessor: Continental Films
- Founded: 1946; 80 years ago
- Headquarters: Neuilly-sur-Seine, France
- Number of locations: 57
- Area served: France, Belgium
- Key people: Brigitte Maccioni (CEO)
- Owner: Canal+ (34%)
- Number of employees: 1520
- Subsidiaries: UGC Ciné Cité; UGC Images; UGC Distribution; UGC Fiction
- Website: www.ugc.fr www.ugc.be

UGC is a cinema operator in France and Belgium, operating 57 cinemas as of 2022. It is also a major film production and distribution company.

== France and Belgium ==
UGC was originally an exclusively French operator, privatized in 1971, who merged with several regional cinema companies running 22 cinemas. The name originally stood for Union Générale Cinématographique, but today only the initials are used. The company is focused on the business side of the film business and French-dubbed versions, showing little interest in the screening of artistic cinema, on the contrary to Pathé and Gaumont cinemas, except in some UGC Paris theatres where the programming is very diversified and includes both subtitled and dubbed versions. Out of Paris, in some cities like Nantes, Bordeaux and Lyon, a part of this diversified programming does exist, but mostly UGC cinemas are like Pathé and Gaumont cinemas. Its competitors include Pathé Cinémas, Cinéville, CGR and Kinepolis Group.

In 2016, Kinepolis Group announced it had sold the four Belgian Utopolis cinemas it had happened to acquire when it had taken over Utopia Group to UGC. UGC had already owned three Belgian cinemas (one in Antwerp and two in Brussels) and now more than doubled that number, adding one cinema each in Aarschot, Lommel, Mechelen and Turnhout.

As of January 2022, UGC had:

- France: 50 cinemas, 512 screens;
- Belgium: 7 cinemas, 74 screens.

== Former operations ==
=== Italy and Spain ===
In Italy there were 4 UGC multiplexes : Porta di Roma and Parco Leonardo in Rome and Fiumicino, 45 ° N in Moncalieri in the urban area of Turin (located exactly on the 45th parallel north, from which it takes its name) and Romagna in Savignano sul Rubicone, close to Cesena and Rimini. The 4 multiplexes consisted of 66 screens and 15,000 total seats.

In Spain UGC had 5 multiplexes: three in Madrid and one each in Valladolid and Cádiz.

Odeon and UCI Cinema Group purchased in 2011 the UGC Cinemas in Italy which are integrated in UCI Cinemas Italy and in Spain which were integrated in the local chain of cinemas Cinesa.

=== United Kingdom and Ireland ===
UGC was formerly also a leading UK cinema owner following the purchase of Richard Branson's Virgin Cinema Group, which it purchased in October 1999. In December 2004, the business was sold to Blackstone Group and joined with Cine-UK to trade as Cineworld. UGC's chain in the UK and Ireland consisted of:

- United Kingdom: 41 cinemas, 391 screens;
- Ireland: 1 cinema, 17 screens.

In July 2005, Cineworld began to phase out the UGC brand, replacing it with its own Cineworld logo. This rebranding was completed in September 2005. Cineworld has retained certain aspects of the UGC offer, including the Unlimited season ticket, originally introduced by Virgin, and the free magazine of the same name.

== See also ==
- UGC Fox Distribution — joint venture with 20th Century Fox
