= Odeon =

Odeon may refer to:

== Ancient Greek and Roman buildings ==
- Odeon (building), ancient Greek and Roman buildings built for singing exercises, musical shows and poetry competitions
- Odeon of Agrippa, Athens
- Odeon of Athens
- Odeon of Domitian, Rome
- Odeon of Herodes Atticus, Athens
- Odeon of Lyon, France
- Odeon of Philippopolis, Plovdiv, Bulgaria
- Odeon theater (Amman), Jordan
- Odeon of Baalbeck, Lebanon

== Modern places of entertainment ==
- Odéon-Théâtre de l'Europe, in Paris, France
- Odeon Theatre (disambiguation), the name of several theatres
- Odeon Cinemas, a cinema brand name in the UK, Ireland and Norway
  - Odeon Cinemas Group
  - Odeon Kino, a cinema group in Norway
  - Odeon Cinema, Barnet, London, England
  - Odeon Cinema, Bilston, England
  - Odeon, Kingstanding, Birmingham, England
  - Odeon Leeds-Bradford, Bradford, England
  - Former Odeon cinemas in Leeds, England
  - Odeon Leicester Square, London, England
  - Odeon Marble Arch, London, England
  - Odeon West End, Leicester Square, London, England
  - Odeon Cinema, Manchester, England
  - Odeon Sheffield, Sheffield, England
  - Odeon Cinema, Weston-super-Mare, England
  - Birmingham Odeon, England
  - Bradford Odeon, England
  - Lewisham Odeon, London, England
  - Newcastle Odeon, England
- Odeon Theatre, Hobart, Tasmania, Australia
- Odeon Events Centre, now Coors Event Centre, in Saskatoon, Canada
- Odeon, Boston, in Boston, Massachusetts, U.S., 1835 – c. 1846
- Odeon (Munich), a former concert hall in Munich, Germany
- Odeon Newport, now The NEON, in Newport, Wales
- Cineplex Odeon, a cinema theatre brand of Cineplex Entertainment
  - List of Cineplex Entertainment movie theatres
- Hammersmith Odeon, now the Hammersmith Apollo, in London, England
- Teatrul Odeon, in Bucharest, Romania

== Other uses ==
- Odeon (album), a 2013 music album by Tosca
- "Odeon", a composition by Ernesto Nazareth (1863–1934)
- Odéon station, a Paris Metro station
- Odeon Film, a German film production company
- Odeon Records, a German record label
- Odeon Tower, a residential skyscraper in Monaco
- Odeon 24, an Italian television network
- Cineplex Odeon Films, or Odeon Films, a former film distributor
- The Odeon, a restaurant in New York City

== See also ==
- Nickelodeon (movie theater)
- Odium (disambiguation)
- Odiham, a village in Hampshire, England
