= Odeon Cinemas =

British cinema chain

Odeon Cinemas Limited
- Formerly: Robfax Limited (October–November 1984); Rank Theatres Limited (1984–1992)
- Type: Subsidiary
- Industry: Entertainment
- Founded: 1928; 98 years ago in Brierley Hill, West Midlands (as 'Picture House'), 1930; 96 years ago in Perry Barr, Birmingham (as 'Odeon').
- Founder: Oscar Deutsch
- Headquarters: London, England
- Number of locations: 103 (United Kingdom); 11 (Ireland); 10 (Norway); 4 (Greece)
- Area served: United Kingdom, Ireland, Norway and Greece
- Key people: Mark Way (president, CEO)
- Parent: Odeon Cinemas Group
- Website: odeon.co.uk odeoncinemas.ie

Odeon Cinemas Limited, trading as Odeon (stylised in all caps), is a cinema brand name operating in the United Kingdom, Ireland, Norway and Greece, which along with UCI Cinemas, Cinesa and Nordic Cinema Group is part of the Odeon Cinemas Group subsidiary of AMC Theatres. It uses the famous name of the Odeon cinema circuit first introduced in Great Britain in 1930. As of 2016, Odeon is the largest cinema chain in the UK by market share (although the Irish cinemas were also included within this figure).

The first Odeon cinema was opened by Oscar Deutsch in 1928, in Brierley Hill, Staffordshire (now West Midlands), England, although initially called "Picture House". The first cinema to use the Odeon brand name was Deutsch's cinema at Perry Barr, Birmingham in 1930. The brand's flagship cinema, the Odeon, Leicester Square in London, opened in 1937. Odeon then became part of the Rank Organisation who continued their ownership of the circuit for a further sixty years. Through a number of sales and acquisitions in the early 2000s the company was purchased by Terra Firma, which merged Odeon and UCI Cinemas to form Odeon UCI Cinemas Group. Most UCI cinemas then took the Odeon brand name in 2006. Terra Firma/UCI sold the company to United States-based AMC Theatres in November 2016.

== History ==
=== Establishment ===
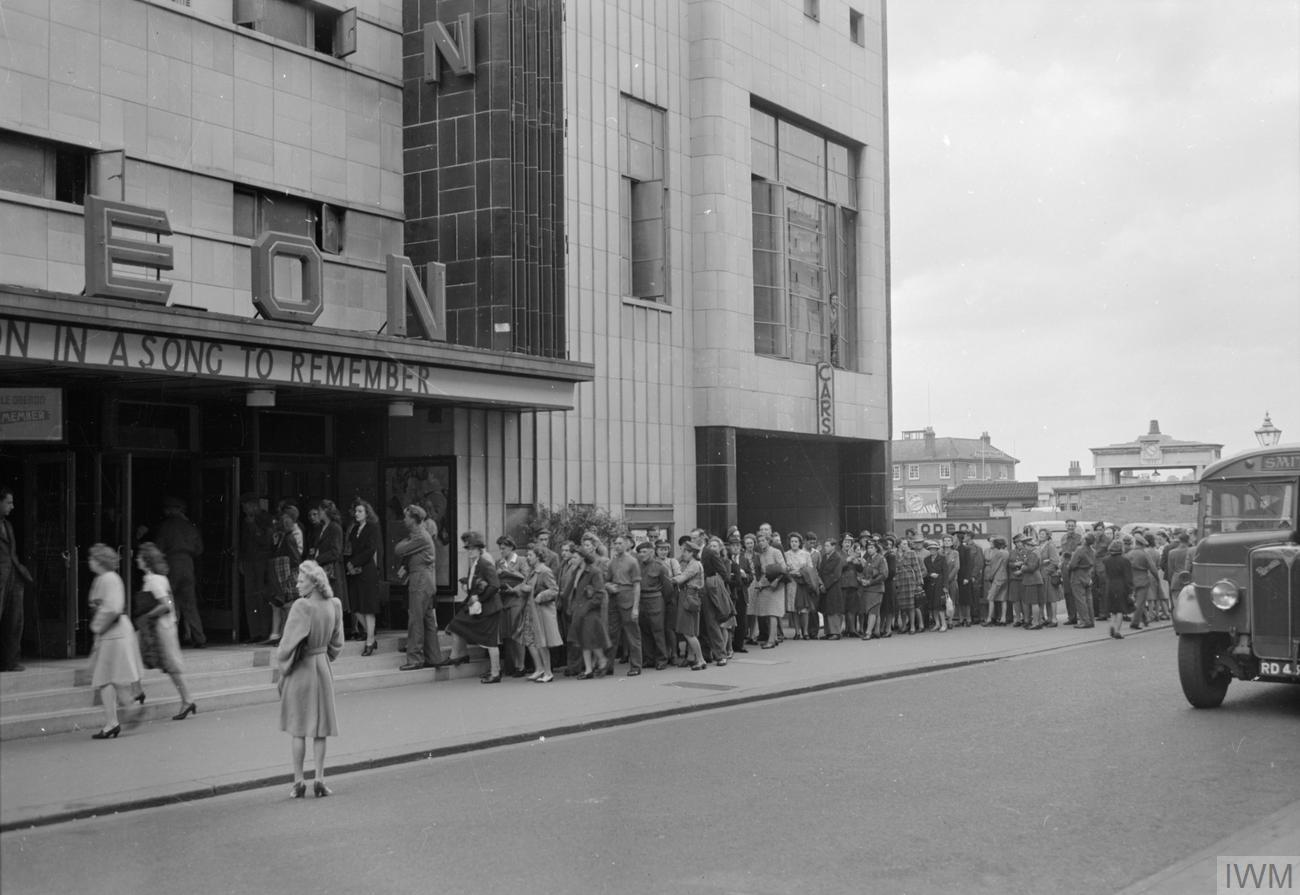
Odeon cinema in Reading, Berkshire in 1945 with filmgoers outside queuing for tickets

Odeon Cinemas was created in 1928 by entrepreneur Oscar Deutsch. Odeon publicists liked to claim that the name of the cinemas was derived from his motto, "Oscar Deutsch Entertains Our Nation", but it had been used for cinemas in France and Italy in the 1920s, and the word is actually Ancient Greek ᾨδεῖον, Ōideion, meaning "a place for singing". The word "Nickelodeon" was coined in 1888 and was widely used to describe small cinemas in the US.

The first cinema opened by Deutsch was located in Brierley Hill, Staffordshire, England in 1928. The building has long since been demolished, but as of 2006, the former UCI cinema (built in the 1980s as an AMC multiplex) at the Merry Hill Shopping Centre in Brierley Hill was refurbished as an Odeon cinema. However, its style is more functional than that of original Odeon cinemas.

The first cinema that opened under the Odeon brand was in 1930, located in Perry Barr, Birmingham. It was designed by Harry Weedon using maritime-inspired Art Deco architecture. The frontage was remodelled following damage sustained during the Second World War and, having been a bingo hall, has since been converted into a conference venue.

=== Expansion ===
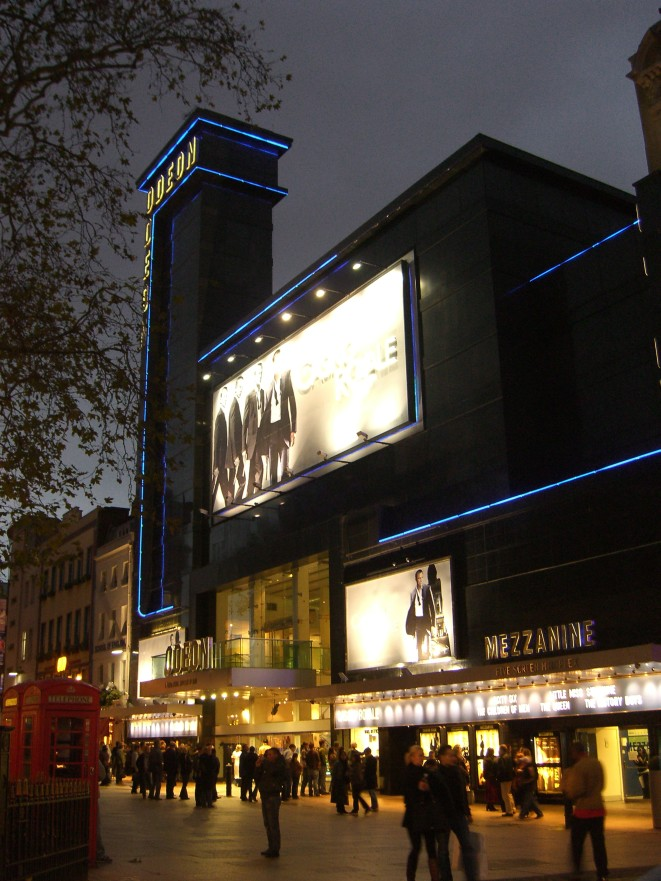
The Odeon in Leicester Square, London which opened in 1937, while showing the 2006 film Casino Royale

In 1932, Deutsch acquired more sites and planned the construction of a chain of cinemas; commissioning Weedon to design his future buildings, with five opening in 1933. Each Odeon cinema had a character different from most other cinemas in the UK, often having a unique and spectacular interior.

George Coles was also one of their principal architects, remodelling a partially complete assembly hall in Portslade and designing his first purpose-built cinema in Upper Wickham Lane, Welling, Kent which opened on 22 October 1934 and closed on 22 October 1960. It is currently a bingo club in the Mecca chain. It featured central linear lighting, a feature that became characteristic of his work. 15 other Odeon cinemas opened in 1934.

In 1935, Deutsch commissioned John Maltby (1910–1980), a professional photographer, to photograph every cinema in the Odeon chain at that time. The resulting collection, of internal and external photographs, is held in the public archive of English Heritage and can be seen online. 13 more Odeon cinemas opened in 1935. The same year, United Artists took a stake in the company for a nominal sum plus the supply of its films to the chain. UA eventually owned 50% of Odeon Cinema Holdings.

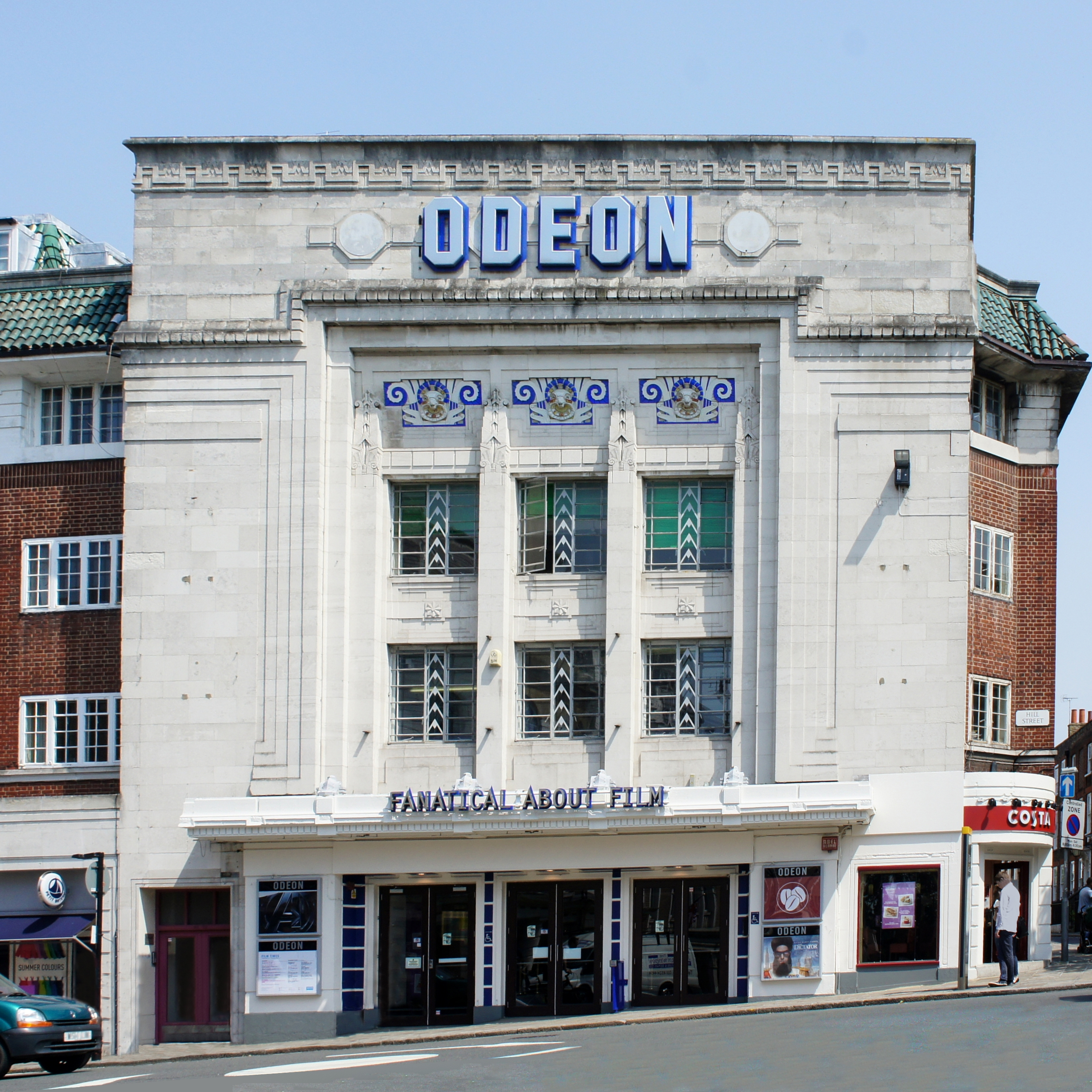
The Odeon Cinema, Richmond, London opened in 1944

In 1936, 35 more Odeons opened and in 1937, the Odeon Leicester Square opened in Leicester Square, London, which became the chain's flagship cinema. Another 35 Odeons also opened in 1937, with the chain concentrating on bigger cities. They also took over County Cinemas and George Singleton Cinemas in Scotland. Odeon Theatres Limited was formed to consolidate the chain of 250 cinemas into one public company.

In 1938, Deutsch sold an interest in the business to J. Arthur Rank, who was in the process of forming the Rank Organisation. In 1939, they acquired most of the small UK cinema operations of Paramount Pictures, including key sites in Birmingham, Glasgow, Leeds, Liverpool and Newcastle upon Tyne.

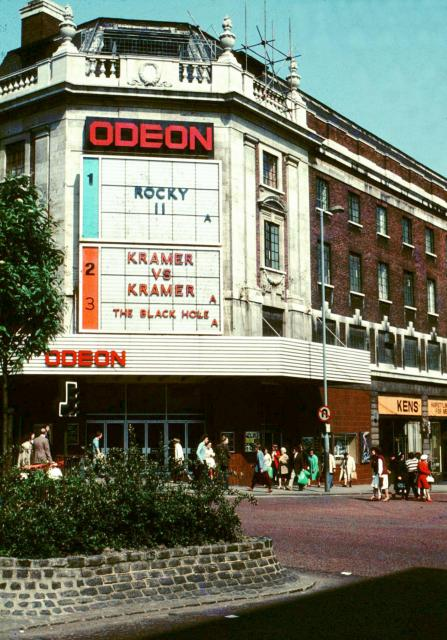
Former Odeon cinema in Leeds, pictured in May 1980

By the time of Deutsch's death in December 1941, the chain had 258 cinemas throughout Britain, including 142 specially built. After his death, his wife sold his shares to Rank, giving Rank control of both Odeon and the rival Gaumont-British chain, which the Rank Organisation had acquired earlier in the year. In July 1942, Odeon acquired a second tranche of the Paramount chain, including the Paramount Theatre in Tottenham Court Road, later renamed the Odeon Tottenham Court Road. In 1948, Rank merged the management and booking operations of Odeon and Gaumont.

In 1953, Odeon brought 3D films, widescreen and CinemaScope to the UK. The Odeon Marble Arch showed Bwana Devil in 3D in March 1953. Later in the year, Odeon showed Tonight We Sing in widescreen at the Odeon Leicester Square and demonstrated CinemaScope at the Odeon Tottenham Court Road to the trade and to the public with The Robe at the Odeon Leicester Square.

In January 1959, Rank restructured its exhibition operation and combined the best Gaumonts and the best Odeons for a new "Rank" release, while the rest of their cinemas were given a new "National" release. With the continuing decline in attendance and cinema numbers, the National release died on its feet and henceforth there were two release patterns, Rank and ABC. There was no reason to perpetuate the Gaumont name, and in towns that lost their Odeon, the Gaumont was usually renamed Odeon within a couple of years of the latter's closure. Even so, the Gaumont name continued to linger until, in January 1987, the last Gaumont, in Doncaster, was renamed Odeon.

A smaller number of Odeon cinemas opened in the post-war years (Odeon Marble Arch and Odeon Elephant & Castle being notable instances), but many single-screen cinemas either closed, sub-divided into smaller screens or were converted into other uses, such as bingo. In 1965, Odeon opened their first multiplex converting their site in Nottingham into a twin-screened cinema. In 1989, they built their first multiplex with an 8-screen site in Stoke-on-Trent.

=== International expansion ===
In 1944, Rank acquired a 50% interest in a Canadian chain and built Odeon cinemas there. It partnered with Hoyts in Australia in 1945 and bought chains in Ireland, New Zealand and South Africa in 1946. By 1956, Rank Odeon had expanded to the West Indies, British Malaya and Ceylon and had an interest in 585 cinemas overseas. In 1957, they opened a cinema in New York City.

Odeon eventually operated a wholly owned Canadian subsidiary, Odeon Theatres (Canada) Ltd., with more than a hundred cinemas in Canada, coast-to-coast. The head office of Odeon Theatres of Canada was in Toronto, and later, the north Toronto suburb of Willowdale. This business was sold in 1978 to the Canadian Theatres chain and became Canadian Odeon Theatres, then was sold again in 1984 to Cineplex Corporation, forming Cineplex Odeon, then later became known as Loews Cineplex Entertainment.

It also owned fifty per cent of an Australian subsidiary, Greater Union Organisation, based in Sydney, with dozens of cinemas across Australia. The Rank Organisation's share of Greater Union Organisation was sold to Amalgamated Holdings Ltd., an Australian company, also in 1984. Greater Union is now known as Event Cinemas.

=== Present day ===
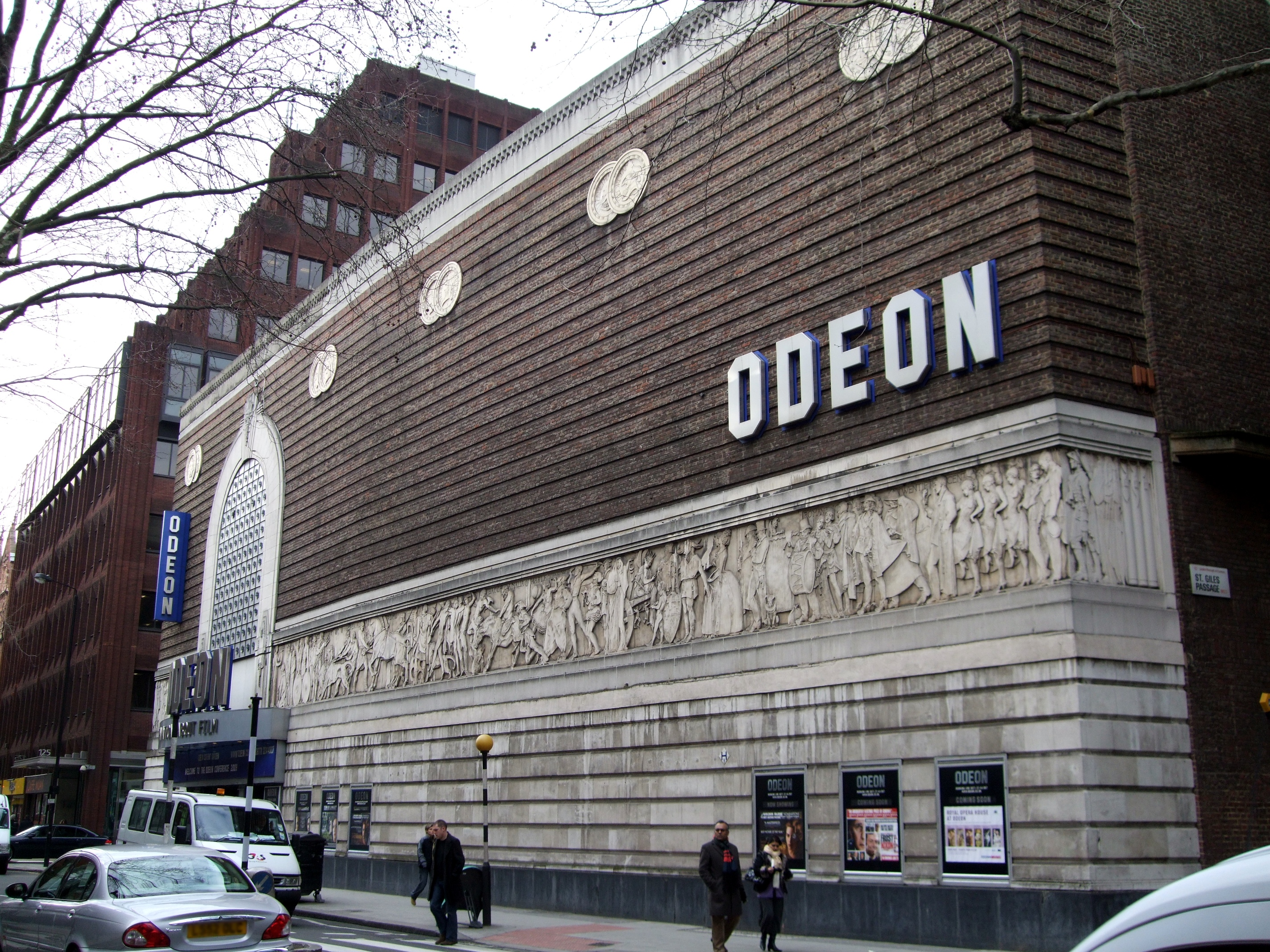
Odeon cinema at 135 Shaftesbury Avenue which opened in 2001

Since the turn of the century, Odeon has undergone a series of sales after the Rank Group needed cash injections to reduce their debt, firstly to Cinven in February 2000 for £280 million which merged Odeon, with 75 cinemas at the time, with Cinven's ABC Cinemas, which comprised 60 cinemas. In 2004, the chain was purchased by Terra Firma and merged with United Cinemas International to produce the largest cinema chain in Europe. As a condition of the merger (imposed by the Office of Fair Trading), Odeon's Newcastle upon Tyne, Sutton Coldfield, Poole, Quinton, Hemel Hempstead and Bromley cinemas were sold to Empire Cinemas. Many smaller, older cinemas such as Odeon Grimsby on Freeman Street were closed to keep market share within legal limits. The remaining UCI cinemas, including Thefilmworks brands, were rebranded as Odeon by early November 2005.

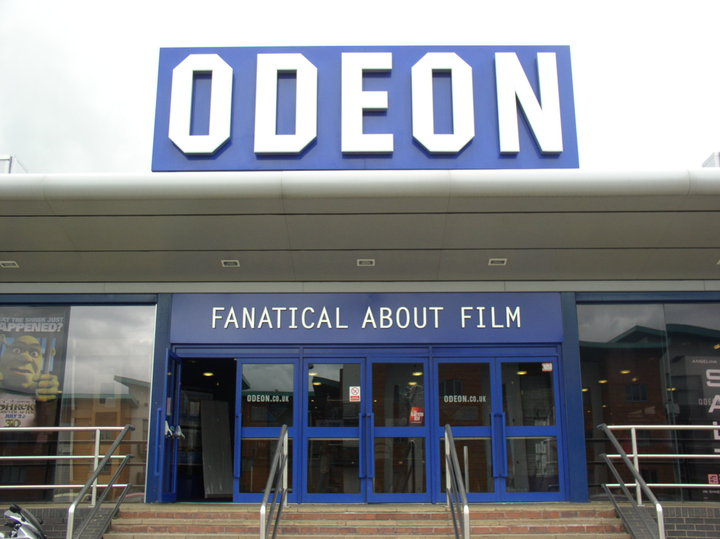
An Odeon cinema at Intu Merry Hill, Brierley Hill, West Midlands

UCI cinemas in Ireland have also joined the Odeon chain, and while they initially retained the UCI brand name, evidence of the merger became apparent, for example when booking tickets by credit card, the name "Odeon" appeared. The Odeon in-house film review magazine, Onscreen, was now also distributed in the UCI cinemas, retaining the Odeon logo font throughout. In August 2007, UCI launched a new Irish website with an identical layout to odeon.co.uk. This website stated that the Irish cinemas were sold to an Irish group, Entertainment Enterprises, in September 2006. This transaction went unreported in the Irish media. It also stated that the cinemas remained part of the Odeon chain under a management contract. Rank/Odeon previously ran cinemas in Ireland (including the flagship, the Savoy Cinema in O'Connell Street) until 1982, when they were purchased by Ward Anderson. In April 2008, Entertainment Enterprises announced that it purchased the Irish assets of Storm Cinemas, and as with the existing UCI chain, would be contracting the running of the cinemas to Odeon. On 31 May 2011, Odeon announced that it had bought back the UCI chain in Ireland (including the Storm Cinemas-branded locations) from Entertainment Enterprises. Odeon rebranded all of its Irish cinemas under the Odeon brand during 2012; the first rebranded cinema reopened on 27 March 2012.

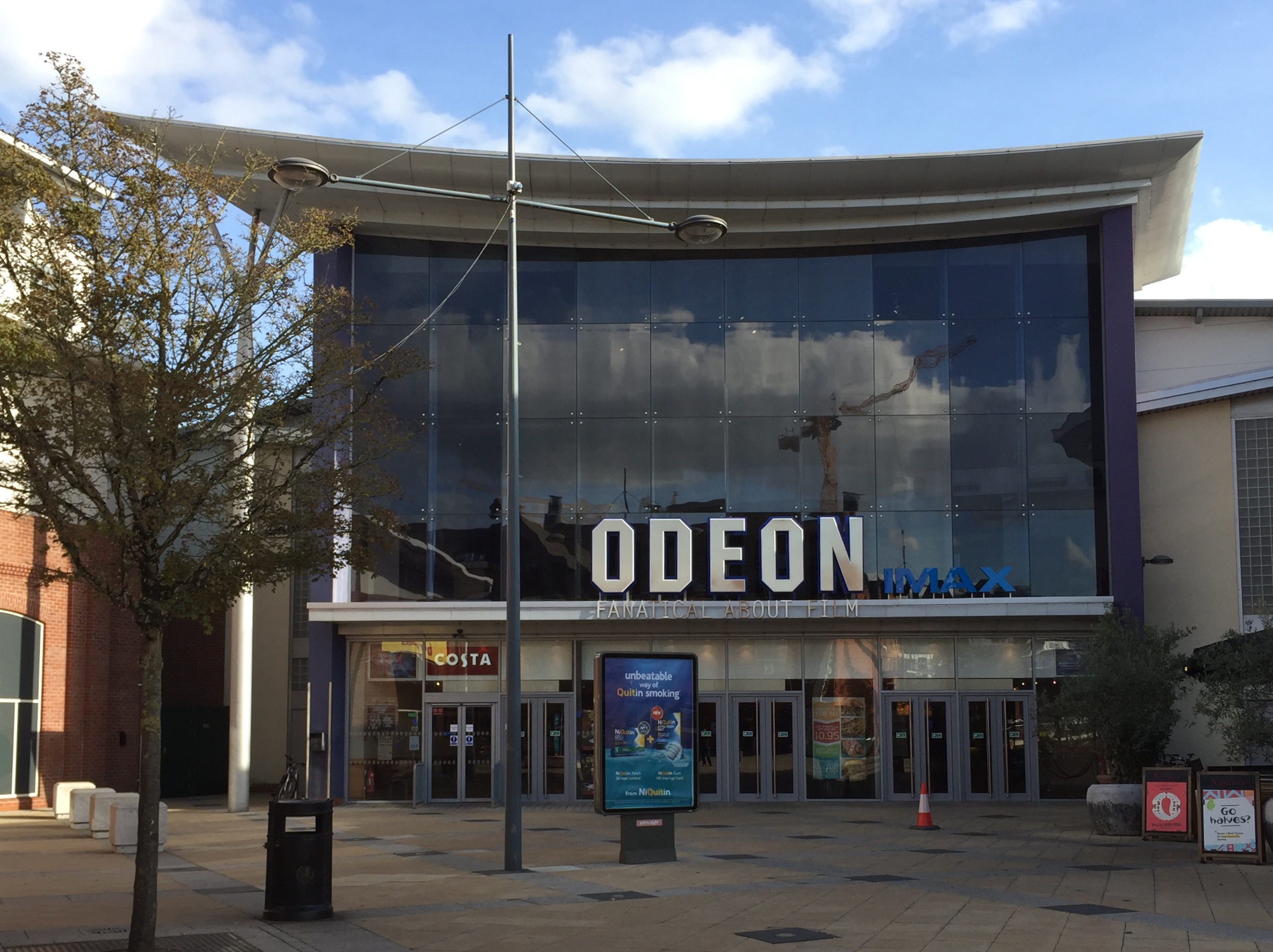
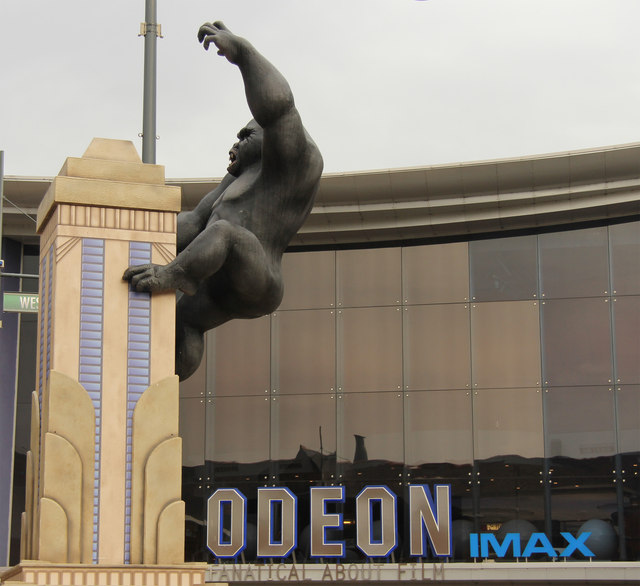
Odeon cinema in Norwich and a statue of King Kong

In February 2007, the UK became home to Europe's first DCI-compliant fully digital multiplex cinemas with the launch of Odeon Hatfield and Odeon Surrey Quays (in London), with a total of 18 digital screens. In 2007 Odeon acquired ten cinemas in Italy. It is now the largest cinema chain in Europe. In March 2012, the Odeon and UCI Cinemas Group under Terra Firma's control reported a £70 million loss for the year 2011, as posted on Companies House. In 2015, Terra Firma announced that it planned to sell Odeon and UCI Cinemas for around £1 billion. In April 2015, the company agreed to sell its cinemas in Gerrards Cross, Esher, Muswell Hill and Barnet to its smaller rival Everyman Cinemas for £7.1 million.

In July 2016, the company was bought for $921 million by the American company AMC Theatres, which is owned by Chinese conglomerate Wanda Group. The deal received approval from the European Commission on 17 November 2016, and was completed on 30 November 2016. In 2018, AMC Theatres bought Norwegian chain SF Kino and renamed it Odeon Kino.

On 17 March 2020, Odeon closed all of its cinemas due to the COVID-19 pandemic. On 11 December 2020, Odeon revealed they were losing $125 million a month due to the closure, and that the emergency funds that had been provided were running out.

On 5 May 2023, Odeon announced the closure on 5 June of five sites, including two of the dwindling number of original Odeons, Ayr and Weston-Super-Mare and also the 1998 10-screen multiplex in Blackpool. On 18 August 2024, Odeon Surrey Quays was closed permanently as part of British Land's redevelopment of the surrounding Canada Water area. There remain six "Oscar Deutsch" Odeons in operation:- Bristol (totally rebuilt internally), Exeter, Harrogate, London Leicester Square, Swiss Cottage and Worcester.

== Rank Screen Advertising ==
They also ran their own advertising company, called Rank Screen Advertising, in competition with the UK market leader Pearl & Dean, which it eventually overtook. Rank Screen Advertising was later rebranded as Cinema Media before being taken over by Carlton Communications and became Carlton Screen Advertising. In 2008, Odeon, along with rival chain Cineworld, bought back the company and today it is known as Digital Cinema Media.

== Services ==
The company operates a website and mobile apps for iOS and Android, allowing customers to book tickets in advance of performances. They ceased a telephone booking service in 2014. They run their own Guest Service Centre, based in Manchester. The company has a support office in Manchester and a smaller office in London.

myLIMITLESS is a nationwide scheme, which, on a twelve-month contract basis, allows members to see screenings as often as they want for a monthly fee.

Odeon provides a dining and film experience in Islington, called the Islington Luxe & Dine.

== Controversies ==
=== Refusals to screen certain films ===
In 2008, Odeon made a controversial move by refusing to screen Rambo on any of its UK screens, blaming it on "commercial differences". In 2010 Odeon proposed a boycott of Tim Burton's Alice in Wonderland at its cinemas in the UK, Ireland and Italy, over a plan by Disney to show the film for a shorter period to allow it to release the film on DVD earlier. Following individual negotiations with Disney; Odeon, Cineworld and Vue reached agreements.

=== Public customer complaint ===
On 24 August 2012, a customer named Matt Pledger posted a complaint on Odeon's Facebook wall about his experience with the cinema, citing high ticket prices, high food prices, inattentive staff, sound bleeding through from the cinema next door, and displaying adverts on how piracy was killing film. The complaint eventually went viral, with over 275,000 'Likes' and over 23,000 comments as of 3 September 2012, as well as receiving attention from the national media, including a programme feature on BBC Radio 4.

=== Ban on Universal Pictures films ===
On 29 April 2020, Odeon Cinemas, alongside its parent company AMC Theatres, announced a ban on all films distributed by Universal Pictures after the latter announced that it would skip releasing some films in cinemas and distribute them directly on streaming and on-demand services during the COVID-19 pandemic. Adam Aron, chief executive of AMC Theatres, said that the ban would apply to all 1,000 outlets worldwide after the coronavirus lockdown. The dispute was resolved in July 2020, with AMC agreeing that Universal could stream films 17 days after theatrical release.
