= Odeon Theatre =

Odeon Theatre or Odeon Theater or Odéon Theatre may refer to:

== Australia ==
- Odeon Theatre in Norwood, South Australia, Australia
- Odeon Theatre, Hobart, in Tasmania, Australia

== Canada ==
- Odeon Theatre Toronto, Canada
- Odeon Theatre (Victoria, British Columbia), Canada

== United States ==
- Odeon Theater (Belview, Minnesota), listed on the National Register of Historic Places (NRHP) in Redwood County, Minnesota, U.S.
- Odeon Theater (Tucumcari, New Mexico), U.S.
- Odeon Theatre (Greensboro, North Carolina), U.S.
- Odeon Theater (Mason, Texas), U.S.

== Other countries ==
- Odeon theater (Amman), in Jordan
- Odeon Theatre (Bucharest), in Romania
- Odeon Theatre, Christchurch, in New Zealand
- Odéon-Théâtre de l'Europe, in Paris, France

== See also ==
- Coors Event Centre, formerly Odeon Events Centre, in Saskatoon, Canada (originally built as a theatre)
- Former Odeon cinemas in Leeds, UK
- Odeon Cinemas, a cinema chain
- Odeon Leeds-Bradford, a cinema complex in the UK
- Odeon Star, a cinema in the Adelaide suburb of Semaphore, South Australia
