= Odean =

Odean is a given name and surname. Notable people with the name include:

== Given name ==
- Odean Brown (born 1982), Jamaican cricketer
- Odean Pope (born 1938), American jazz saxophonist
- Odean Skeen (born 1994), Jamaican sprinter
- Odean Smith (born 1996), Jamaican cricketer

== Surname ==
- Terrance Odean (born c. 1950), American economist

== See also ==
- Odeon (disambiguation)
