= Odium =

Odium may refer to:

- Gorky 17, released as Odium in North America, a computer game
- Odium (album), by Morgoth, 1993
- Odium, a god from the fantasy series The Stormlight Archive

== See also ==
- Odeon (disambiguation)
- Odiham, a village in Hampshire, England
- Odium theologicum, the often intense anger and hatred generated by disputes over theology
- Argumentum ad odium, where someone attempts to win favor for an argument by exploiting existing negative feelings in the opposing party
