= Nordic Cinema Group =

Swedish cinema company

Nordic Cinema Group AB
- Company type: Subsidiary
- Industry: Cinema
- Founded: 2013; 13 years ago
- Headquarters: Stockholm, Sweden
- Area served: Nordic and Baltics
- Parent: Odeon Cinemas Group
- Subsidiaries: Filmstaden (formerly SF Bio); ODEON Kino (formerly SF Kino); Finnkino

Nordic Cinema Group AB is a Swedish company which owns cinemas and cinema saloons in three countries (Sweden, Norway and Finland). It was founded in 2013 through a merger of Filmstaden in Sweden, Odeon Kino in Norway, Finnkino in Finland and Forum Cinemas in the Baltics. Between 2013 and 2017, it was owned by both Bridgepoint and Bonnier Group.

In 2017, it was bought by AMC Theatres and merged into Odeon Cinemas Group. It still exists as the parent holding company for the local companies.

In 2020, the cinemas in the Baltics were sold to UP Invest.
