= Cinesa =

Spanish film exhibition company

Cinesa – Compañía de Iniciativas y Espectáculos, S.A.
- Trade name: Cinesa
- Company type: Subsidiary
- Industry: Cinema
- Founded: 1944; 82 years ago in Barcelona, Spain
- Founders: Alfredo Matas; José Arquer
- Headquarters: Barcelona, Spain
- Area served: Spain
- Owner: AMC Theatres
- Parent: Odeon Cinemas Group
- Website: www.cinesa.es

Cinesa – Compañía de Iniciativas y Espectáculos, S.A., trading as Cinesa, is a Spanish film exhibition company founded in 1944. It currently has 35 complexes and 417 cinemas throughout Spain. The company is part of the Odeon Cinemas Group, a group that operates in several European countries such as Spain, United Kingdom, Ireland, Germany, Italy and Portugal. Since 2016, Odeon Cinemas Group is owned by AMC Theatres.

== History ==
In 1944 Barcelona producer Alfredo Matas and businessman José Arquer joined forces to open a luxury complex on Avenida Diagonal in Barcelona. The Cine Windsor was the result of this partnership, a place that not only offered film screenings, but also a bar, a restaurant and a pocket theatre, thus becoming a cultural meeting point in the Catalan capital.

It was in 1958 that an innovative technology was introduced at the Cine Windsor: the Cinerama projection system made its appearance, featuring a curved screen that encompassed the viewer's entire field of vision. This revolutionary technology combined three images projected from different projectors in a synchronised manner, providing viewers with a unique and immersive visual experience. Matas was responsible for bringing this technology to Spain, renovating the Teatro Nuevo and the Cine Albéniz in Madrid to adapt them to the new technical specifications of the Cinerama.

Eventually new partners joined and the complex was renamed Cinesa. In 1962, Cinesa began its expansion, starting by setting up a travelling cinema called Itinerama, which toured the country to show the new projection system to the main cities in Spain. This initiative allowed more people to enjoy the Cinerama experience.

Subsequently new cinemas were opened in Madrid, such as Proyecciones, and in Barcelona, such as Florida. However, in 1966, due to the technical complexity and high cost of the Cinerama, the decision was taken to discontinue its use. This led Cinesa to adapt its cinemas to screen conventional films and to continue its expansion gradually.

In 1972 the company increased from 11 to 25 screens, and in 1973, Cinesa introduced the "Ticket Rojo", a special discount on ticket prices for pensioners, a programme that still applies today under the name of "Mayores de 65 años". Between 1976 and 1980, the company reached a total of 37 cinemas, thanks in part to the introduction of the first mini cinemas. This successful format in other countries led Cinesa to establish the so-called Minicinemas in Madrid, the first of them being inaugurated on 16 July 1976 at 126 Fuencarral Street. In 1986, the spectator's day was established and a modernisation plan for the cinemas was implemented.

In the 1990s Cinesa became the leader in the cinema exhibition sector with 65 screens and 6.5 million spectators. In 1992, they began to accept the Carnet Joven and created the Carnet de Estudiante Universitario (University Student Card).

Throughout its history Cinesa was owned by major shareholders, including William Forman, an American businessman who held the operating licence for the Cinerama. Forman acquired a majority stake in Cinesa through various share acquisitions. Later, his son, who already owned 80% of the company, reached an agreement with United Cinemas International (UCI) to acquire 100% of Cinesa. In 2004, UCI joined Terra Firma Capital Partners, a British investment firm, leading to a new phase in Cinesa's history, and in 2005, Cinesa acquired Warner Lusomundo Sogecable and 11 multiplexes. In 2006, they bought the AMC Cinemas cinema complexes.

In 2011 Cinesa further expanded its presence by acquiring five cinemas from the French chain UGC, thus expanding its presence in Spain. That same year, they also acquired the Coliseo Zubiarte and Coliseo Max Ocio cinemas from the Coliseo Circuit, consolidating their position in the cinema exhibition market.

In 2014 Cinesa continued its expansion by acquiring several cinemas from the ÁBACO CINEBOX company, which allowed them to expand their presence in different locations in Spain, such as Guipúzcoa, Seville and Castellón.

In 2016 the Odeon – UCI Cinemas Group, of which Cinesa is part, was acquired by AMC Theatres, making it the largest cinema exhibition company in the world.

In March 2023 Cinesa introduced Unlimited Card, a new cinema subscription plan in Spain. This plan allows viewers to access unlimited releases throughout the year for a monthly fee of 15.90 euros.
