= UCI Cinemas =

International cinema chain

- UCI's current logo in Germany, Italy and Portugal.
- Type: Subsidiary
- Industry: Entertainment
- Founded: 1988; 38 years ago
- Headquarters: Amsterdam, Netherlands
- Number of locations: 29 (Brazil); 23 (Germany); 39 (Italy); 3 (Portugal)
- Area served: Brazil; Germany; Italy; Portugal
- Parent: Odeon Cinemas Group (Germany, Italy and Portugal); Brazil: National Amusements (2004-2025); Harbor Lights Entertainment (2025-2026); Cia Brasileira de Cinemas (2026-present)
- Website: www.uci-kinowelt.de ucicinemas.it www.ucicinemas.pt www.ucicinemas.com.br

UCI Cinemas (United Cinemas International) is a brand of cinema, currently operating in Germany, Italy, Portugal and Brazil, which has been owned since 2004 by Odeon Cinemas Group, whose owner is now AMC Theatres. The Brazilian branch of the cinema chain is currently owned by Cia Brasileira de Cinemas, a joint venture between Cine Araújo and Grupo Vila Rica, and was previously owned by Harbor Lights Entertainment from 2025-2026 and National Amusements from 2004 until August 7, 2025.

== History ==
UCI's logo used in Germany and Austria from 2014 to 2018.

The organization was announced in October 1988 as a joint venture between United Artists Theaters, United International Pictures (a partnership of Paramount Pictures, Metro-Goldwyn-Mayer and Universal Pictures), and AMC Theatres, to operate, under the AMC brand, 200 screens in the UK and Ireland with 3 new cinemas opening in Bochum, Bremen and Cologne in West Germany and a further 150 screens planned in the UK and Ireland by 1991. However, AMC pulled out of the joint venture in December 1988, and sold their UK assets to the new entity for $98 million and withdrew from the UK market, with the joint venture now known as Cinema International Corp./United Artists Communications Inc. The name was shortened the following year to United Cinemas International and they were based in Manchester, England, operating 86 cinemas initially.

In the UK, the company operated cinemas under the UCI and later Thefilmworks brands, and initially enjoyed a sizeable market share. They took over the first multiplex cinema opened in the UK by AMC at The Point in Milton Keynes in 1985, and were one of the first to purchase a digital projector – costing a massive £130,000 – one out of only 30 worldwide. This enabled them to download films via satellite, and also play digital media disks rather than film. Under chairman Tom McGrath, the group expanded to build and operate cinemas in Brazil, China, Germany, Ireland, Italy, Japan, Portugal, Spain, Taiwan, and the UK.

In late 2004, the European division of UCI was bought by Terra Firma Capital Partners, along with rival chain Odeon Cinemas. The majority of UK UCI and thefilmworks cinemas were rebranded to use the Odeon name. As a condition of the merger with Odeon Cinemas (imposed by the Office of Fair Trading), UCI Clydebank, UCI Poole, UCI Sutton, UCI Basildon, The Empire Leicester Square and thefilmworks High Wycombe were sold to Empire Cinemas. Since the merger has been completed, few elements of former UCI cinemas still retain the UCI look and feel, they now almost all share the standard Odeon design cues, except for a handful of the former "Filmworks" brand whose designs did not lend themselves well to an Odeon "look". UCI Hull was evicted at around this time due to redevelopment. As there was already an Odeon there, it was not replaced.

UCI's Brazilian branch, which was inaugurated in 1997 with its first cinema located in the Palladium mall in Curitiba, was acquired, also in 2004, by American conglomerate National Amusements, who also owns the Showcase Cinemas chain and Viacom, the owner of Paramount Pictures. Coca-Cola beverages sold in those cinemas were replaced by Pepsi, coincidentally Showcase's beverages. Their biggest cinema in Brazil and the biggest in Brazil, in general, is the New York City Center cinema in Rio de Janeiro, with 18 screens, including IMAX, 4DX, De Lux and XPlus screens. They also have SuperSeats and SuperD seats in select auditoriums throughout Brazil.

Irish cinemas, although retaining the UCI name, were managed as part of Odeon Cinemas and introduced parts of their offer, such as Premier seating and the Odeon in-house magazine, "Onscreen". Advertising contained the Odeon logo font in many cases. In August 2007, UCI launched a new Irish website with an identical layout to odeon.co.uk. The Irish cinemas were sold to an Irish group, Entertainment Enterprises, in September 2006, but continued to be run by Odeon under a management contract. In April 2008, Entertainment Enterprises announced that it would be acquiring the Storm Cinemas chain except the Belfast cinema, and would be contracting the management of the cinemas to Odeon. UCI's Tallaght cinema, the first opened in the country, was closed on 8 March 2010, after the landlords gave the company notice that their lease would not be renewed. On 31 May 2011, Odeon announced that it had bought back the UCI chain in Ireland (including the Storm Cinemas-branded locations) from Entertainment Enterprises.

Irish cinemas were rebranded under the Odeon name in 2012 to coincide with the new cinema opening at the Point Village in Dublin, as of the end of 2013 the UCI name is no longer used in any cinemas in the UK & Ireland, all are now branded Odeon. The Odeon in-house magazine "Onscreen" was rebranded and relaunched as "Odeon" magazine in 2012. In early 2019, the three cinemas in Austria were sold and rebranded as part of Cineplexx Cinemas.

Following the merger of Skydance Media and Paramount Global which formed Paramount Skydance (renamed Skydance) on August 7, 2025, National Amusements was reincorporated as Harbor Lights Entertainment and UCI Cinemas Brasil became owned by Harbor Lights. In August 2026, Harbor Lights sold UCI Cinemas Brasil to Cia Brasileira de Cinemas, a joint venture between Cine Araújo and Grupo Vila Rica.

== Current locations ==
=== Brazil ===
- Belém – Shopping Bosque Grão-Pará
- Campo Grande – Shopping Bosque dos Ipês
- Canoas – Park Shopping Canoas
- Curitiba – Shopping Estação, Shopping Palladium
- Fortaleza – Shopping Iguatemi Fortaleza, Shopping Parangaba
- Juiz de Fora – Shopping Independência
- Manaus – Sumaúma Park Shopping, Shopping Manauara
- Recife – Shopping Recife, Shopping Plaza Casaforte, Shopping Tacarauna
- Ribeirão Preto – Ribeirão Shopping
- Rio de Janeiro – New York City Center, NorteShopping, Park Shopping Campo Grande
- Salvador – Shopping da Bahia, Shopping Paralela, Shopping Barra
- São Luís – Shopping da Ilha
- São Paulo – Shopping Jardim Sul, Shopping Anália Franco, Santana Parque Shopping, Shopping Plaza Sul
- São Bernardo do Campo – Shopping Metrópole

=== Germany ===
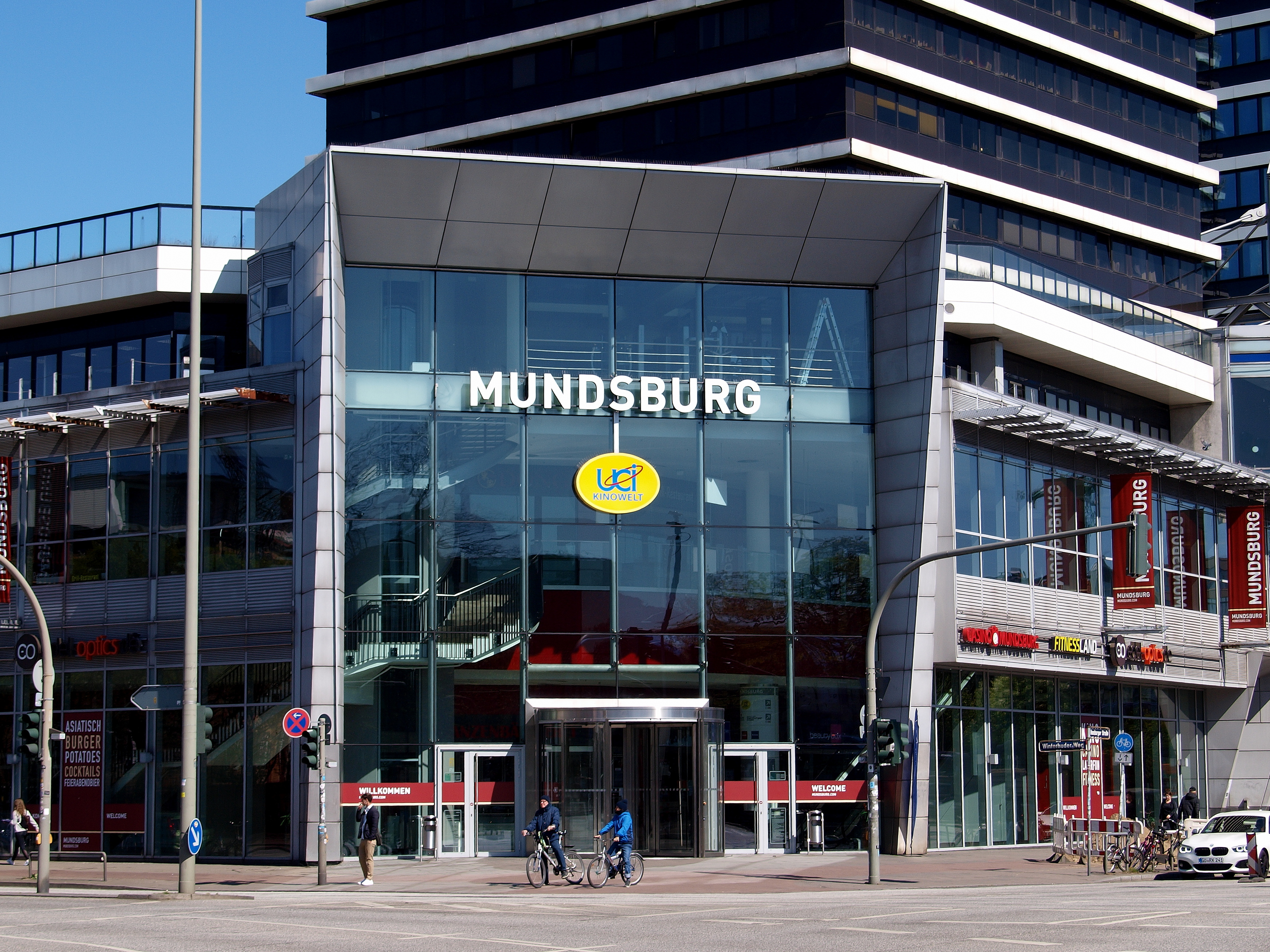
UCI Mundsburg cinema in Hamburg

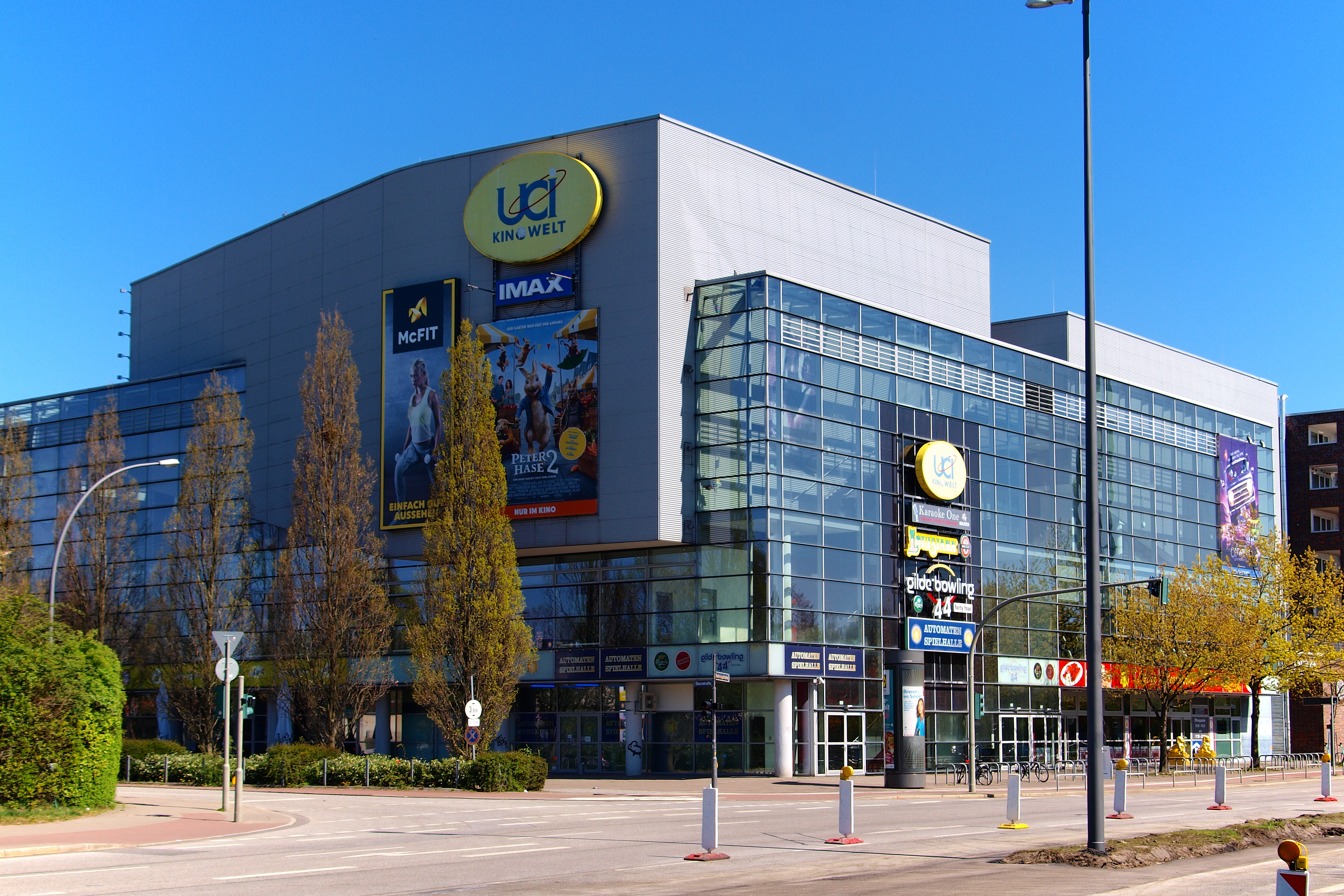
UCI Othmarschen Park cinema in Hamburg

- Bad Oeynhausen
- Berlin – am Eastgate
- Berlin – Colosseum
- Berlin – Gropius Passagen
- Berlin – East Side Gallery
- Bochum – Ruhrpark
- Cottbus – am Lausitz Park
- Dessau-Roßlau – Dessau
- Dresden – Elbe Park
- Düsseldorf
- Duisburg
- Flensburg
- Gera
- Hamburg – Mundsburg
- Hamburg – Othmarschen Park
- Hamburg – Smart City (Wandsbek)
- Hürth – Hürth-Park
- Kaiserslautern
- Leipzig – Günthersdorf Nova Eventis
- Neuss
- Nordhorn
- Paderborn
- Potsdam
- Wilhelmshaven

=== Italy ===
- Alessandria
- Arezzo
- Bari
- Bologna
- Bolzano
- Casalecchio di Reno
- Casoria
- Catania
- Como
- Curno
- Fano
- Ferrara
- Fiume Veneto
- Florence
- Genoa
- Gioia del Colle
- Gualtieri
- Iesi
- Lissone
- Marcianise
- Marcon
- Matera
- Milan
- Molfetta
- Moncalieri
- Orio al Serio
- Palermo
- Piacenza
- Pioltello
- Perugia
- Porto Sant'Elpidio
- Reggio Emilia
- Rome
- Savignano sul Rubicone
- Sinalunga
- Turin
- Verona
- Vicenza
- Villesse

=== Portugal ===
- Lisbon – Ubbo
- Lisbon – El Corte Ingles
- Porto – Arrábida Shopping
