= Odeon Kino =

Cinema chain in Norway

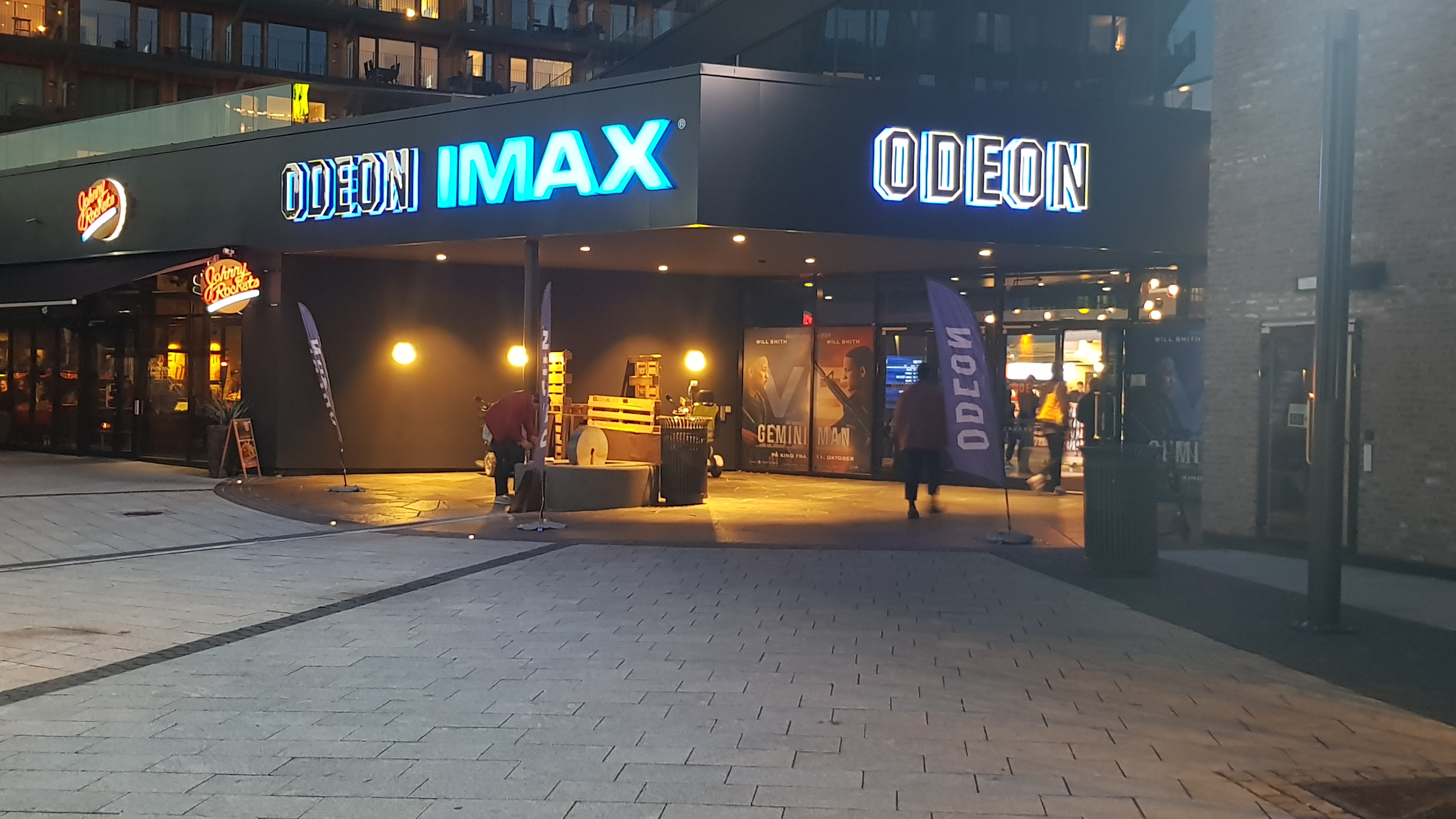
- Odeon Oslo in 2019.
- Formerly: SF Kino (until 2018)
- Company type: Subsidiary
- Industry: Cinema
- Founded: 1999; 27 years ago
- Area served: Norway
- Owner: Odeon Cinemas Group
- Parent: Filmstaden AB
- Website: https://www.odeonkino.no/

Odeon Kino (formerly SF Kino) is the largest cinema group in Norway with over 200 employees with cinemas in 10 cities. It is fully owned by AMC Theatres through Filmstaden AB.

It changed its name from SF Kino to Odeon Kino after being purchased by AMC Theatres in 2018.
