= AMC Theatres =

American movie theater chain

AMC Entertainment Holdings, Inc.
- Logo used since 1994

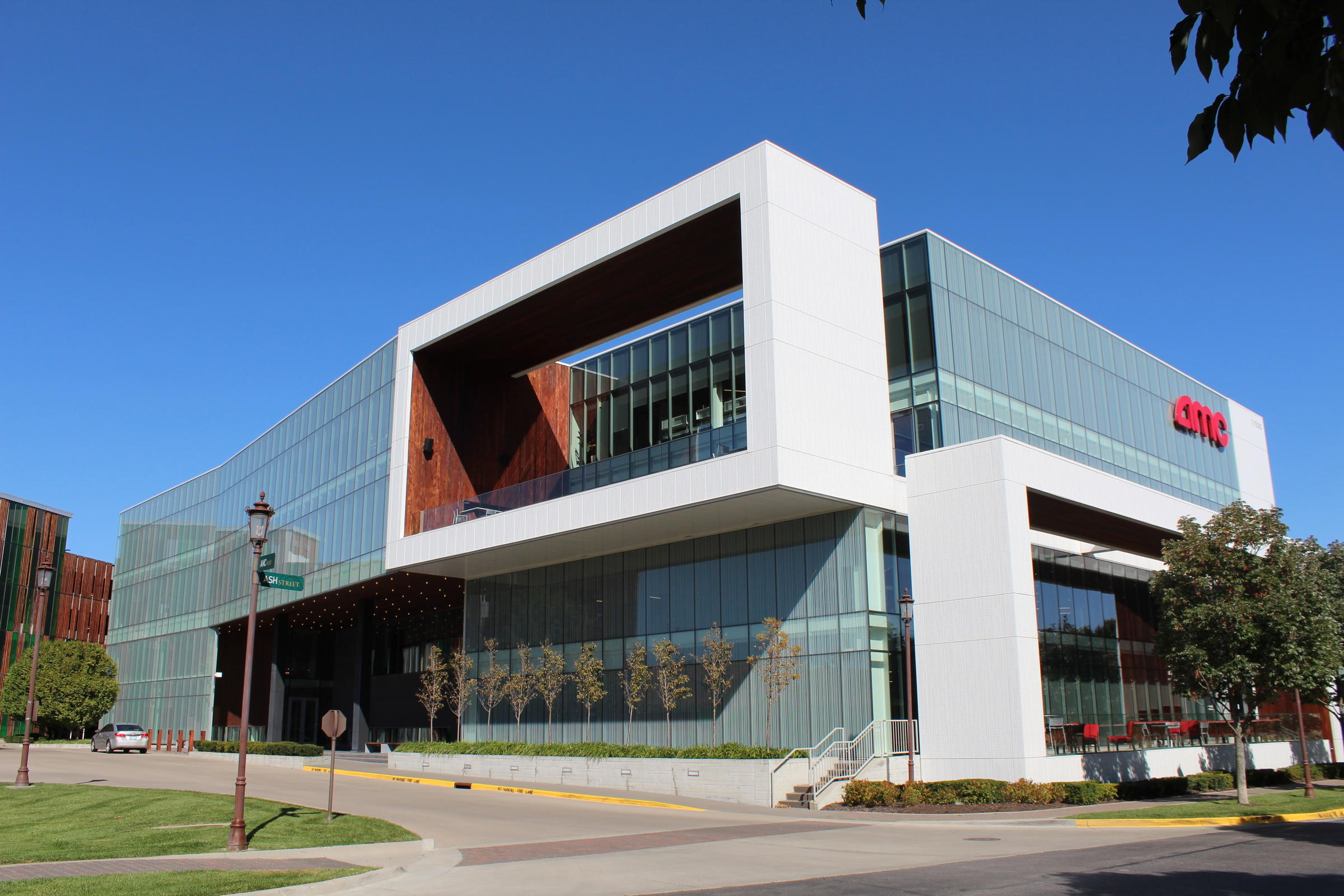
- Headquarters in Leawood, Kansas
- Trade name: AMC Theatres
- Formerly: Dubinsky Bros. (1920–1931, 1932–1939); Publix-Dubinsky Bros. (1931–1932); Durwood-Dubinsky Bros. (1939–1947); Durwood Theatres (1947–1968); American Royal Cinemas (1968–1969); American Multi Cinema (1969–1980); AMC Entertainment Inc. (1980–2013)
- Type: Public
- Traded as: NYSE: AMC (Class A); Russell 2000 component
- Industry: Entertainment
- Predecessors: General Cinema Corporation; Loews Cineplex Entertainment; Carmike Cinemas; For AMC Classic: Starplex Cinemas
- Founded: 1920; 106 years ago in Kansas City, Missouri, U.S.
- Founders: Edward Durwood; Maurice Dubinsky; Barney Dubinsky
- Headquarters: Leawood, Kansas, U.S.
- Number of locations: 898 theaters and 10,059 screens
- Key people: List: Adam Aron (Odeon Cinemas Group president, CEO) Dan Holland (OCG chairman) Mark Way (Odeon Cinemas president, CEO) John Partilla (Screenvision division CEO)
- Revenue: ▲US$4.84 billion (2025)
- Operating income: ▲US$−0.63 billion (2025)
- Net income: ▼US$−0.39 billion (2023)
- Total assets: ▼US$9.00 billion (2023)
- Total equity: ▼US$−1.84 billion (2023)
- Number of employees: 33,812 (December 2023)
- Divisions: Leawood Films
- Subsidiaries: AMC Entertainment, Inc. Fork & Screen Dine-In Theatres; The Café at AMC; AMC Cinema Suites; AMC Red Kitchen; Wanda Cinemas; Screenvision (20%); Odeon Cinemas; UCI Cinemas (except in Brazil); Starplex Cinemas; Eastwynn Theatres, Inc. George G. Kerasotes Corporation; GKC Indiana Theatres, Inc. Michigan Theatres, Inc. GKC Theatres, Inc. Military Services, Inc. Nordic Cinema Group
- Website: amctheatres.com

AMC Entertainment Holdings, Inc., doing business as AMC Theatres and commonly known as AMC (originally an abbreviation for American Multi-Cinema), is an American movie theater chain headquartered in Leawood, Kansas. AMC is the largest movie exhibition company in the United States, the largest in Europe and the largest throughout the world with approximately 860 theaters and 9,600 screens across the globe. It was founded in Kansas City, Missouri, on Thursday, December 20, 1920. The company expanded quickly across Missouri and with significant expansion into its current home state of Kansas. AMC Theatres quickly dominated the landscape of multiplex theaters solidifying itself as a leader in the film exhibition industry in the 20th century. After acquiring Odeon Cinemas, UCI Cinemas, and Carmike Cinemas in 2016, it became the largest movie theater chain in the world. It has 2,807 screens in 353 European theaters and 7,755 screens in 593 American theaters.

The company is listed on the New York Stock Exchange (ticker symbol: AMC); from 2012 to 2018, the Chinese conglomerate Wanda Group owned a majority stake in the company. Private equity firm Silver Lake Partners made a $600 million investment in AMC in September 2018, but the voting power of AMC shares was structured so that Wanda Group still controlled the majority of AMC's board of directors. Amid financial downturns caused by the COVID-19 lockdowns, in January 2021, Wanda's ownership was increasingly diluted due to new financing by AMC, as well as short squeezes that resulted in Silver Lake converting its $600 million debt holding to equity. In early February 2021, Wanda converted its Class B shares to Class A shares, thus reducing its voting power to less than 50%. On May 21, 2021, Wanda filed a 0.002% stake with the SEC, largely confirming the end of their involvement in AMC.

== History ==
Feature Presentation snippet from 1980

AMC Theatres was founded in 1920 by Maurice, William, Irvin, Edward, and Barney Dubinsky, sons of Polish-Jewish immigrants Simon and Sarah Dubinsky from the village Białogródka (now in Ukraine). The Dubinsky brothers had been traveling the Midwest performing melodramas and tent shows with actress Jeanne Eagels. They purchased the Regent Theatre on 12th Street between Walnut and Grand in downtown Kansas City, Missouri. Maurice, the oldest brother, died in 1929, and Barney left the company in 1936 after being injured in an auto accident. Edward, the youngest brother, eventually changed his last name to Durwood, and the company they formed eventually became known as Durwood Theatres, after a legal fight with his brothers. The chain also had theaters in St. Joseph and Jefferson City, Missouri, and Leavenworth and Topeka, Kansas.

When Edward's son Stanley left the U.S. Air Force after World War II, he joined the company in 1945. He persuaded his father to build drive-in theaters in St. Joseph, Jefferson City, and Leavenworth. In 1947 they expanded further with the acquisition of the Liberty Theater in downtown Kansas City which they remodeled and renamed the Roxy. They won an antitrust suit to enable them to show first-run product at the Roxy and went on to acquire all of the downtown cinemas in Kansas City including The Empire Theater, the Capri Theatre, the Midland Theatre and the Paramount Theatre.

In 1961, after Ed died, Stanley took control of Durwood Theatres, a small ten-theater chain. With an interstate planned around Kansas City, Durwood looked to sites outside downtown and acquired two sites at a shopping center on Kansas City's Ward Parkway to build a 700-seat theater. As the sites could not be combined, they opened two theaters side-by-side as the Parkway Twin Theatre in 1963. This was the company's first foray into using the multiplex model. According to Variety, Stanley Durwood later claimed in 1962 that he "was standing in the lobby of his 600-seat Roxy in Kansas City mulling over its poor grosses, when he realized he could double his box office by adding a second screen and still operate with the same size staff".

Following the success of the Parkway Twin, AMC followed up with the Embassy 3 triplex at the Country Club Plaza; the Metro Plaza, a four-screen theater in Kansas City in 1966; and a six-screen theater in Omaha in 1969.

The industry quickly embraced the multiplex concept, where additional screens meant very little difference in staff and operating costs but resulted in a significant profit increase. The concept also provided more film choices at one location, drawing bigger crowds. It also gave owners the flexibility to show big hits on more screens and less reliance on any individual film that could turn out to be a bust.

Stanley renamed Durwood Theatres as American Royal Cinema on October 1, 1968, after the American Royal livestock and horse show, but the latter's producers sought an injunction, and the name was changed to American Multi-Cinema, Inc.

Stanley began to apply military management and the insights of management science to revolutionize the movie theater industry. As he later explained to Variety magazine, "We needed to define what our company was doing in the (exhibition) business. My dad wasn't that organized." It was structured under the belief that every customer was a "guest".

In the second quarter of 2026, AMC reported its highest quarterly revenue to date, at US$1.60 billion. Attendance increased by 12 percent in its United States theaters and approximately 18 percent in its international markets compared with the same quarter of the previous year.

=== Growth ===
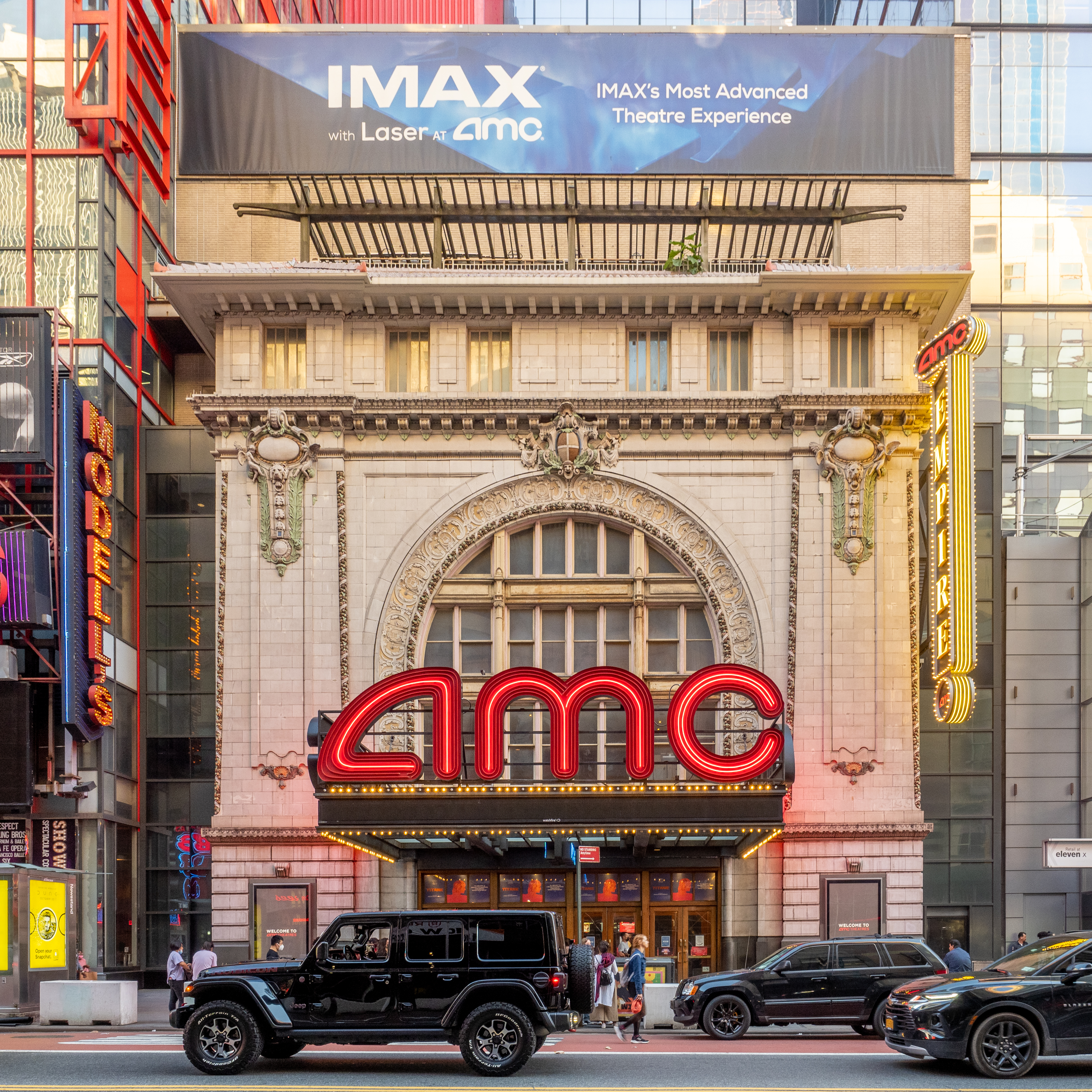
The AMC Empire 25 theatre in Times Square, New York City

By the 1980s, the company was experiencing strong growth; in 1983, it had its initial public offering. AMC Theatres built its first multiplex overseas in 1985, the 10-screen multiplex at The Point, Milton Keynes, in the United Kingdom, and later opened additional sites in the UK such as in Dudley and Tamworth, Staffordshire. In October 1988, they announced a joint venture with United Artists Theaters and Cinema International Corporation (a partnership of Paramount Pictures and Universal Studios) to run their combined cinemas in the UK, Ireland under the AMC name, however, AMC pulled out of the joint venture in December, and sold their U.K. assets, including their 12 cinemas, to the new entity (later called United Cinemas International) for $98 million and withdrew from the UK market.

In 1988, Kinepolis Brussels, the first megaplex in the world, with 25 screens and 7,600 seats, was opened by Kinepolis, the European chain.

In 1995, AMC Theatres opened the first North American megaplex, the AMC Grand 24 in Dallas, Texas, a theater complex that could accommodate thousands. AMC continued to open other megaplex theaters, such as the AMC Hampton Towne Center 24 in Hampton, Virginia, and the chain's busiest theater in the US, the AMC Empire 25 in New York City near Times Square.

On December 13, 1996, AMC opened the Ontario Mills 30, a 30-screen theater in Ontario, California, which at the time was the largest multiplex in the world. AMC Theatres' megaplex theaters were a success overseas as well. In April 1996, they opened Canal City 13 in Fukuoka, Japan, which was followed on December 20, 1996, by the AMC Arrábida 20 in Porto, Portugal. In January 2002, the 16-screen Great Northern theater was opened in Manchester in the UK, marking the chain's return to the UK market after 14 years. This was later supplemented by the opening of a 12-screen cinema on the Broadway Plaza site in Birmingham in October 2003. AMC Theatres sometimes serve a dual function; in addition to the regular cinema functions, they also cater to companies' business conferences that can make use of their projectors for displaying presentations.

In 2004, AMC Theatres was acquired by Marquee Holdings Inc., an investment vehicle controlled by affiliates of J.P. Morgan Partners, LLC, the private equity arm of JPMorgan Chase, and Apollo Global Management, a private investment firm. At the time, AMC was publicly traded on AMEX under the code AEN.

In 2006, the company announced a new initial public offering (IPO) expected to be worth approximately $789 million; however, adverse market conditions convinced the company's management to withdraw from such an offering on May 3, 2007. The company filed for a $450 million IPO in its third such filing since 2006 on July 14, 2010.

Stanley Durwood died in 1999, and his successor was Peter Brown, the first non-Dubinsky/Durwood family member to head the company. Brown, who became just the third chairman in AMC's history, served as CEO for over a decade. During his tenure, the company's revenues grew from $400 million to $2.3 billion. Gerardo I. Lopez succeeded Brown as president and CEO of AMC Theatres on March 2, 2009. Previously, Lopez was the Executive Vice President of President Consumer Products Group, Seattle's Best Coffee, and Foodservice at Starbucks. Under new leadership, one of the first major announcements came in March of the same year; the company announced that it would equip 1,500 of its screens with RealD 3D projectors. In the same month, AMC Theatres collaborated with Sony to replace all of its reel projectors with digital cinema projectors, starting in the second quarter of 2009 and completing in 2012.

The company was formerly headquartered in downtown Kansas City. In September 2011, AMC Theatres announced plans to move its headquarters to a new $30 million four-story building designed by 360 Architecture in the Park Place development at 117th Street and Nall Avenue in Leawood, Kansas, in suburban Kansas City. Kansas had offered $47 million in incentives to get the 400 jobs to move across the Kansas/Missouri border.

After reaching a settlement with the state of Illinois regarding complaints from a disability rights organization in April 2012, AMC pledged to equip all of its theaters in the state with captioning and description services by 2014. The disability rights group had accused the company of only providing closed captioning or audio description systems at some of its locations in the state.

=== Acquisition by Wanda Group (2012–2021) ===
Logo used from 2012 to 2022

In May 2012, AMC Theatres was acquired by Chinese conglomerate Wanda Group, headquartered in Dalian, who paid $2.6 billion to acquire AMC's 5,048 screens in 347 theaters in the U.S. and Canada. The deal was finalized on September 4, 2012. The acquisition made Wanda the world's largest cinema chain. Wang Jianlin, CEO of Dalian Wanda Group, announced that the company would plan to spend $500 million renovating AMC locations.

AMC Theatres had eight movie theaters in Canada. In July 2012, four locations were sold to Cineplex Entertainment, and two more locations were sold to Empire Theatres and later acquired by Landmark Cinemas. The two remaining locations have since closed.

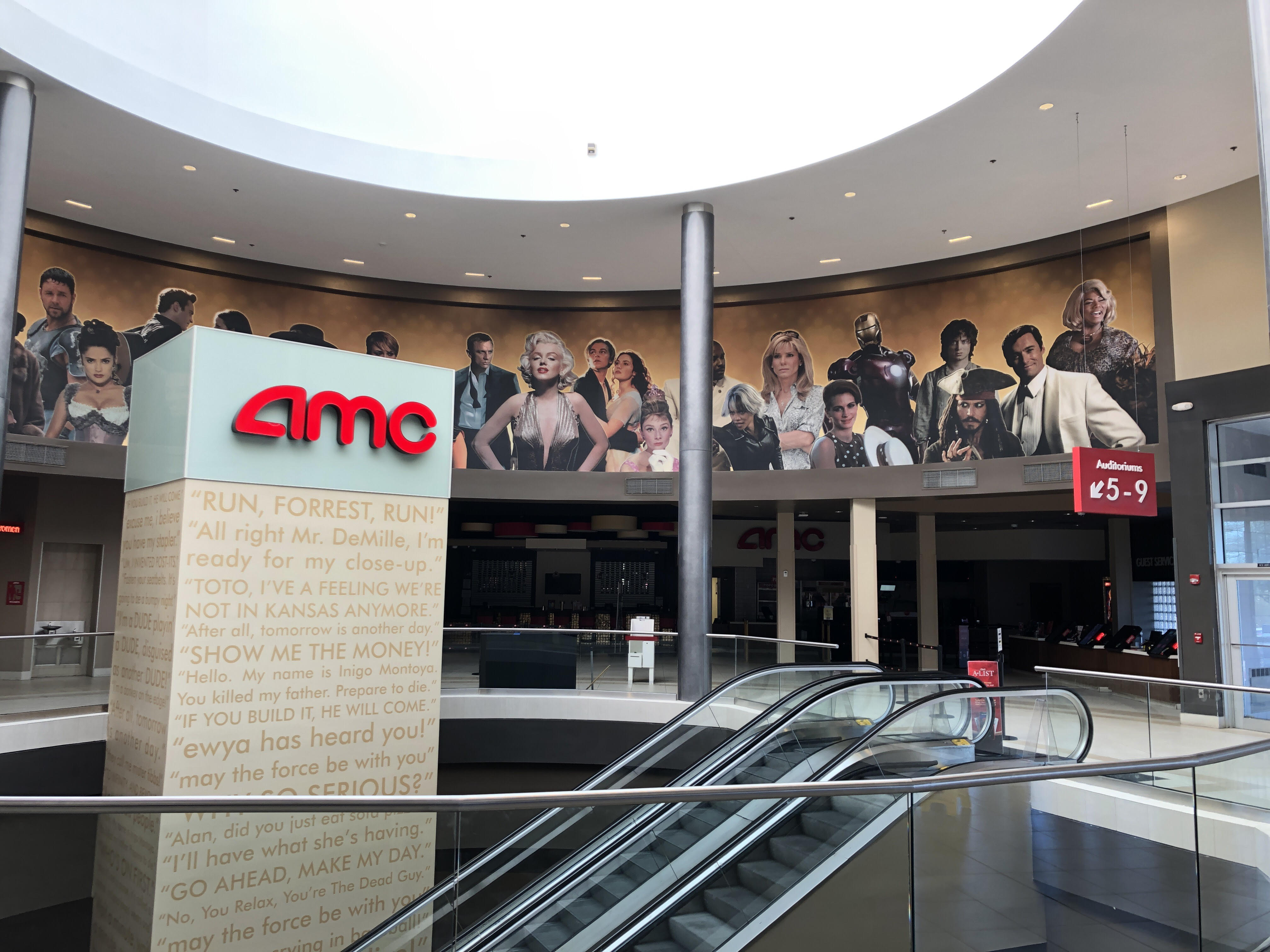
AMC Lakeline 9 in Austin, Texas

Gerardo I. Lopez announced his resignation as CEO of AMC in August 2015. Craig Ramsey was appointed as the interim CEO by the company board. In December 2015, AMC announced that Adam Aron would be the company's president and chief executive officer, as well as a member of the company's board of directors, beginning on January 4, 2016.

In March 2016, AMC Theatres announced it would acquire competitor Carmike Cinemas. In July 2016, Carmike's management accepted a revised offer, pending regulatory and shareholder approval. The deal was closed on December 25, 2016, making AMC the largest cinema chain in the United States.

On March 1, 2017, AMC Theatres CEO Adam Aron stated that the company would rebrand Carmike Cinemas locations under the AMC name; smaller locations were rebranded under the new banner AMC Classic (which repurposes trademarks associated with Carmike). Aron also announced a plan to rebrand its kitchen-equipped theaters as AMC Dine-In.

In July 2017, AMC Theatres announced they would cut $30 million in expenses by the end of the year. This cost reduction would be accomplished by reducing operating hours, cutting staffing levels, and other measures.

In September 2018, Silver Lake Partners made a $600 million investment in AMC Theatres, whose proceeds were used to repurchase approximately 32% of Wanda Group's class B common stock. However, the voting power of AMC's shares is structured in such a way (granting three votes per share for each Class B share if its stake in the company is above 30%) that, even after reducing its ownership of AMC common stock to just under 50% by the end of 2019, Wanda Group continued to retain majority control over AMC's board of directors.

In October 2019, AMC began to offer on-demand rentals and purchases of digital film releases under the banner AMC Theatres On Demand. The service is tied to the company's Stubs loyalty program.

=== Impact of the COVID-19 pandemic ===
On March 18, 2020, AMC announced the closure of all of its theaters due to the COVID-19 pandemic, in compliance with CDC guidance against any gathering of over ten people. AMC said this shutdown would last for at least six to twelve weeks. On March 25, 2020, AMC furloughed all of its 600 corporate employees, including CEO Adam Aron. All furloughed corporate AMC employees and associates retained active employment status, including all health benefits.

On April 28, 2020, following the release of Trolls World Tour on video on demand, AMC announced they would no longer carry films from Universal Pictures after NBCUniversal CEO Jeff Shell commented in The Wall Street Journal that the studio wanted to release films via premium video on demand simultaneously with theatrical releases. The company threatened that this would also be done with any other studio "who unilaterally abandons current windowing practices absent good faith negotiations between us, so that they as distributor and we as exhibitor both benefit and neither are hurt from such changes".

On June 3, 2020, AMC stated that it had "substantial doubt" that it would remain in business. On July 28, 2020, AMC and Universal were able to resolve their dispute, with AMC agreeing to a shorter theatrical window of 17 days before Universal could release their films via premium VOD, as well as revenue sharing on the premium VOD window.

On August 20, 2020, AMC began the process of reopening selected locations in the United States where allowed under local health orders. In honor of the company's centennial year, AMC also offered a special 15-cent ticket promotion that day, promoted as "Movies in 2020 at 1920 Prices." The company aimed for at least two-thirds of its locations to be open in time for the September 3 release of Tenet. The company upgraded its air filtration systems to four times the rates before the pandemic and installed electrostatic sprayers in the auditoriums. In October 2020, the company reported that its existing cash resources "would be largely depleted by the end of 2020 or early 2021".

=== Stock surge, end of Wanda Group control ===
On January 26, 2021, AMC stated that it had raised $917 million in new funding, including $506 million in equity and new common shares, and commitments for $411 million in debt financing. The company stated that this new funding "should allow the company to make it through this dark coronavirus-impacted winter". The next day, as part of a wider series of short squeezes coordinated by the Reddit community r/wallstreetbets (which primarily targeted video game retailer GameStop), AMC experienced a major, 300% surge in its share price to a peak of $20.36. The surge triggered Silver Lake Partners' convertible bonds; on January 28, it reached an agreement to convert $600 million of its debt holdings in AMC to equity at $13.51 per-share. Mudrick Capital Management made nearly $200 million in profit off its holdings of AMC debt.

On February 5, 2021, a U.S.-based subsidiary of Wanda Group issued a filing with the SEC, stating that it had converted its Class B common stock to Class A shares to permit their sale. While Wanda remained AMC's largest single shareholder, the conversion, as well as AMC's financing efforts taking its stake below 37%, effectively surrendered its majority control since Class A stock only provides one vote per-share.

During its fourth-quarter earnings call in March 2021, the company reported that its revenue had fallen by 88% year-over-year. CEO Adam Aron stated that AMC was facing the "most challenging market conditions in the 100-year history of the company", but cited progress on COVID-19 vaccinations, decisions to allow cinemas in New York City and Los Angeles to re-open, and a "significant" number of upcoming blockbuster films as signs of optimism. Aron also confirmed that Wanda no longer had majority control, and the company would now "be governed like most other publicly traded companies with a wide array of shareholders". On May 21, 2021, Wanda filed a 0.002% stake with the SEC, largely confirming the end of their involvement in AMC.

In June 2021, retail investors once again poured into AMC stock, propelling shares to an all-time high of $77.26 in another alleged short squeeze. Short sellers betting against AMC incurred losses of over $2.8B as a result. AMC issued more shares during the surge, but warned potential investors against buying the shares "unless you are prepared to incur the risk of losing all or a substantial portion of your investment". The cinema chain operator said it believed current prices reflected "market and trading dynamics unrelated to our underlying business". In the year to date, AMC shares soared 2,421 percent despite the closure of theaters during the pandemic.

In August 2021, the company revealed plans to begin accepting cryptocurrencies such as Bitcoin for purchases in the future, which it did in November 2021 for online purchases via PayPal. In April 2022, AMC added integration with BitPay as a payment provider to its mobile app, allowing customers to use crypto payments such as Dogecoin and Shiba Inu.

On August 4, 2022, AMC took Wall Street by surprise with the announcement of its "AMC Preferred Equity Units" after market close, a new preferred share class. The units were to be listed on the New York Stock Exchange under the symbol "APE," a nod to the individual investors who turned the company into a meme stock, who often refer to themselves as "apes". Over 516 million APE units were subsequently issued to AMC shareholders in a 1:1 special dividend, with the units wielding similar economic properties as common shares. AMC stock gained 19 percent to $22.18 at the close on Friday after initially falling following the announcement of the new units on Thursday. The preferred shares began trading under the "APE" ticker on the New York Stock Exchange, starting August 22.

In February 2023, AMC announced plans to test a dynamic pricing model for tickets for showings that occur after 4pm based on seat location. Seats located near the front of the theater and select ADA seats would be priced less than other seats and were only be made available to members of the Stubs rewards program and seats in the middle of the theater would be priced more than the other non-front row seats. In addition, AMC Stubs A-List members would be able to reserve the expensive middle seats at no additional charge. In July 2023, AMC chose to abandon dynamic pricing after testing showed that customers were still not likely to choose front-row seats despite their lower prices, with most customers still sitting in the middle of the theater or other non-front seats despite the upcharge. This made AMC believe their prices were less competitive as competitors did not also adapt dynamic pricing. The company also stated that it would test seats that recline further back in the front rows that would potentially allow better views.

On July 31, the company reported their highest single-week admissions revenue in company history due to the Barbenheimer craze. On September 6, AMC announced that it had planned to sell $40 million in shares.

AMC announced on August 31, 2026, that they would be forming a new distribution label called Leawood Films. This venture was specifically aimed at helping financed and completed movies get a theatrical release. Leawood Films will be advised by former Warner Bros. Pictures chairman Toby Emmerich and Apple TV executive Ricky Strauss, with Kyle Davies leaving his executive position at Bleecker Street to join full-time as an employee.

== Features ==
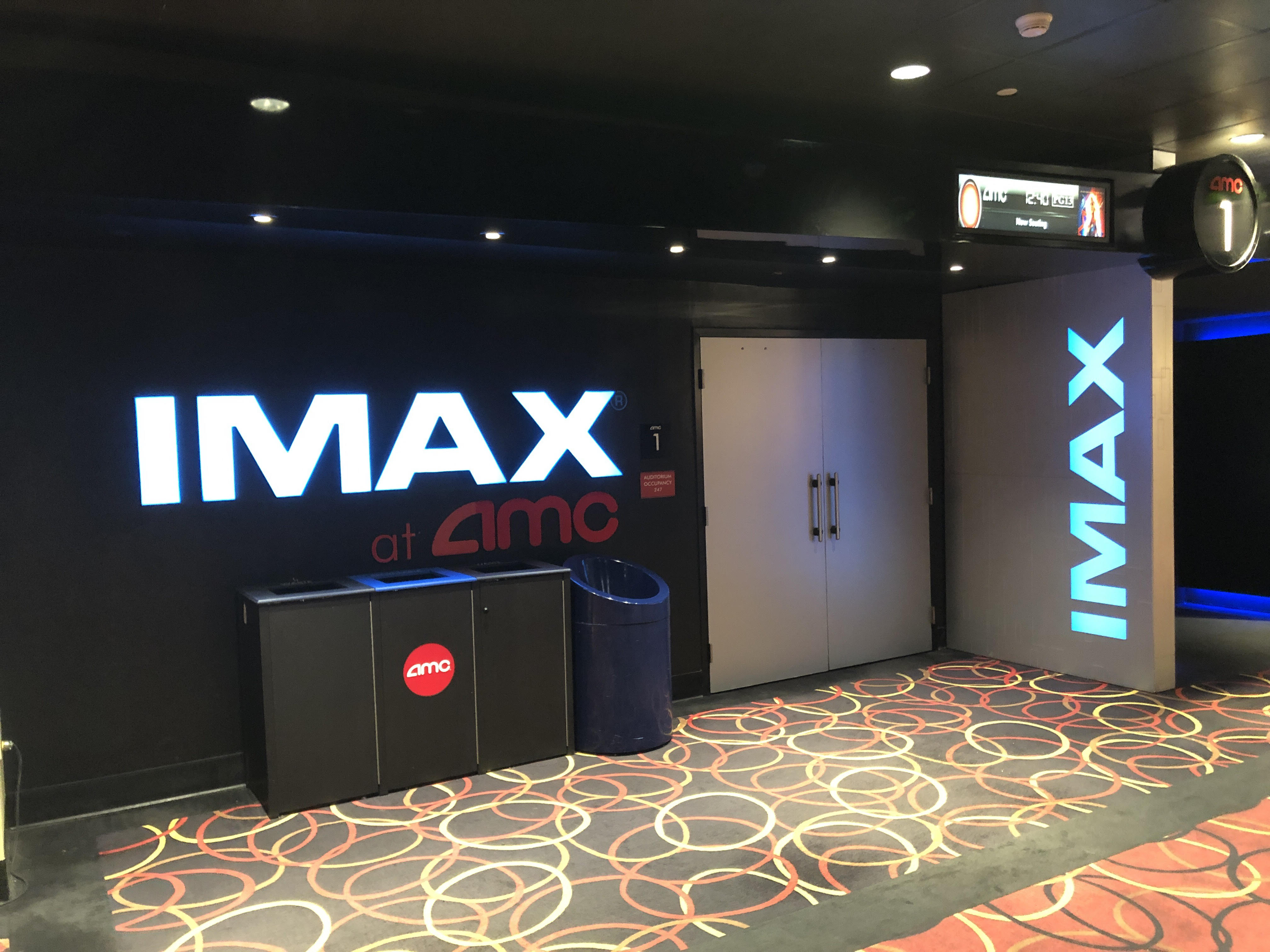
A typical entrance to an IMAX digital theater, such as the AMC Theatres Barton Creek Square 14 in Austin, Texas

AMC patented cup holder armrests in 1981. AMC also introduced stadium-style seating. The seats are placed on risers so that each person has an unobstructed view of the screen. In 1995, they introduced "Love Seat" style seating with retractable armrests so that there can be no barrier between two seats. In July 1994, AMC signed an agreement with Sony to begin installing Sony Dynamic Digital Sound (SDDS) in auditoriums, and began upgrading selected older auditoriums in 2003. On March 26, 2009, AMC announced an agreement to convert 1,500 existing auditoriums to fully digital 3D screens using RealD technology.

On March 30, 2009, they announced they would convert all 4,500 screens in their chain to 4K digital projectors provided by Sony. In April 2022, AMC also announced an agreement with Cinionic to install laser projectors at 3,500 of its screens in the United States through the end of 2026.

=== Premium formats ===
Selected AMC locations offer premium screens and features for a higher ticket price, including premium large formats.

- Dolby Cinema is a premium auditorium made in collaboration with Dolby Laboratories that features dual 4K laser projectors with Dolby Vision HDR, Dolby Atmos immersive sound, and recliners with seat-mounted subwoofers. They also feature special entrance tunnels into the auditorium, with select locations providing a video wall displaying content relating to the film being screened. Some Dolby Cinema screens were converted from the Prime and ETX formats.
- IMAX auditoriums are available at many locations; IMAX digital or laser projectors are used in most locations, with a rare using standard 70 mm film projectors.
- Prime at AMC is a premium large format that features large screens with Dolby Atmos and/or DTS:X, and recliners with seat-mounted subwoofers. In 2015, AMC began to replace Prime with Dolby Cinema at select locations.
- BigD is a premium large format inherited from the Carmike Cinemas chain, which uses a 70-foot screen and stadium seating with retractable armrests.
- RealD 3D auditoriums are available, using RealD 3D glasses.
- XL at AMC is an auditorium to help audiences identify extra-large standard screens offering 4K laser projection, a branded entrance, and online ticketing without reliance on a specific PLF. It also supports 3D and 2D projection and flexible programming for theaters with PLFs.
- 4DX at AMC delivers an immersive movie experience by integrating precision motion seating and more than 21 environmental effects—including wind, water, snow, vibration, and scent—all seamlessly synchronized with the on-screen action. As of March 19, 2026, new 4DX locations, including AMC Gulf Pointe 30 and AMC Barrywoods 24, were opened as part of this deal.
- ScreenX at AMC auditoriums transforms select scenes by projecting specially designed visuals that stretch beyond the main screen onto the theater walls, fully immersing the audience in the film's world and action. As of March 19, 2026, additional ScreenX locations, such as the AMC Burbank 16 and AMC Town Square 18, were announced as opened as part of this ongoing rollout.

==== Defunct premium format ====
- ETX (Enhanced Theatre Experience) was a premium large format used in selected markets, which included larger screens, 12-channel surround sound, and digital projection (utilizing Sony 4K projection and Christie DLP technology). Some auditoriums also included Dolby Atmos. In 2015, AMC began to replace ETX with Dolby Cinema.

=== Virtual reality ===
AMC Entertainment Holdings Inc. invested $20 million in virtual-reality arcades and productions: $10 million to virtual reality entertainment company Dreamscape Immersive and another $10 million in a content fund.

=== Guest loyalty programs ===
AMC Theatres created the now-defunct MovieWatcher program that rewarded frequent movie-goers similar to other rewards programs but featured innovative aspects. It was based on a points-per-movie-ticket-purchased system, with rewards varying from concessions to movie passes based on point-based level. However, points were limited to a maximum of four points per three-hour time period, which was equal to two tickets. For the AMC cinemas that were not part of the Loews Cineplex acquisition and therefore ticketed by MovieTickets.com, the website's surcharge was waived for MovieWatcher members.

On April 1, 2011, AMC started a new rewards program known as AMC Stubs, which could be purchased for a fee of $12 for an entire year. For that initial fee, members would receive $5 on every $50 spent between the box office and the concession stand at any AMC theater nationwide. AMC Stubs members also received a free size upgrade with every popcorn and drink they purchase (for example, an AMC Stubs member can get a large popcorn for the price of a regular).

Other perks include birthday gifts and waived ticketing fees for online ticketing sites such as MovieTickets.com and Fandango and also online ticket purchases through AMC's own website and mobile app. Receipts or ticket stubs were required for manual adjustments. No more than four manual adjustments would be allowed per account in a single calendar month. Manual adjustments would be made for purchases made within 30 calendar days from date of original purchase.

As of March 29, 2012, AMC Stubs had 3.2 million members, which represents approximately 18% of AMC attendance during fiscal 2012. In July 2018, AMC Stubs was split into three programs that are currently still in place: the free AMC Stubs Insider; the yearly fee-based AMC Stubs Premiere, which costs $15 annually and provides the same benefits as the original Stubs plus an expedited line at tickets and concessions; and the monthly fee-based AMC Stubs A-List, which includes up to four movie tickets a week to any film in any format for $19.99 to $27.99 a month, depending on the state the member plans to watch movies in. Discount Tuesdays is another feature every Tuesday for members to purchase tickets typically for just $6 to any film in most locations, with occasional exclusions, plus surcharges for premium formats such as 3D, IMAX, and Dolby Cinema, as well as special events. On July 8, 2025, Discount Wednesdays was added as part of an expansion of AMC Stubs, in addition to the 50%-off savings on movie tickets on both Tuesdays and Wednesdays.

=== MacGuffins Bar and Lounge ===
Some AMC locations have a bar service under the MacGuffins brand. These are primarily offered at AMC and AMC Dine-In locations, but some AMC Classic locations with liquor licenses offer their alcoholic beverages under this brand. Drinks can be ordered to be consumed in the bar and lounge area or taken into the theater. Some AMC Dine-In theaters have their MacGuffins set up as a full-service restaurant that can be accessed without having to pay for a movie ticket.

== Banners ==
Following the acquisition of Carmike Cinemas, AMC began to unify its theaters under one of three main banners in 2017:

- AMC serves as the flagship banner, covering conventional theaters with premium features and formats available. Many of the former Loews Cineplex Entertainment theaters still use the Magic Johnson Theatres sub-brand as AMC Magic Johnson and, formerly until 2017, AMC Loews.
- AMC Classic is used for smaller locations with fewer premium amenities. The brand is primarily used by the former Carmike locations, and uses Carmike's "folded film" logo and "America's Hometown Cinemas" slogan. Since the Carmike purchase, some AMC Classic locations have undergone refurbishments to add expanded concessions options (including a larger menu, MacGuffins bars, and Coca-Cola Freestyle machines), upgraded AV equipment, and reclining seats, and switches from second-run to first-run films.
- AMC Dine-In is used for cinemas that offer expanded food service, including auditoriums with reserved seating and table service.

== Other endeavors ==
AMC also formed a short-lived collaboration with Planet Hollywood that failed due to that company's bankruptcy. The Planet Movies by AMC venture planned to open complexes worldwide with the objective of having icon locations in major metropolitan and other select areas, like Orlando and Columbus. Initially, seven existing, unnamed AMC megaplex theaters with more than 150 combined screens were to be re-branded under a license arrangement to incorporate certain elements of the new concept. The initial seven re-branded locations were to include markets such as Orlando, Florida. The AMC Pleasure Island 24 megaplex in Orlando, situated directly across from Planet Hollywood's most successful restaurant and retail unit and adjacent to Disney's Pleasure Island (now Disney Springs) was to be the first Planet Movies location.

After the initial seven, the joint-venture planned to own and operate all subsequent units including 8 to 10 complexes with 200 to 250 screens planned to open over the next 18 to 24 months. Over the longer term, the venture anticipated rolling out units at the rate of 5 to 10 per year. From almost the very start, the well-publicized financial strains on Planet Hollywood hindered the project. The only Planet Movies location to actually open, a 30-screen megaplex, did so in the summer of 1999 at Easton Town Center in Columbus, Ohio. The location was also located alongside an Official All Star Café and Planet Hollywood restaurant.

The continued poor financial performance of Planet Hollywood led the company to declare bankruptcy in December 1998, and even before the first location had opened stated that "the joint venture has no definitive plans to expand this concept once the Columbus site is completed". As Planet Hollywood was preparing to emerge from bankruptcy in October 1999 their re-organization plan emphasized focus back on their core restaurant business and away from side-ventures like Planet Movies and their Cool Planet ice cream chain. The Planet Hollywood restaurant and All Star Café in Columbus were closed in late 2000, and the film memorabilia were also removed from the theater as it was rebranded AMC Easton 30, and continues to operate. The Planet Movies by AMC joint venture was formally dissolved on January 9, 2001.

Both of the Disney Parks in the United States at one time included AMC movie theaters at their Downtown Disney sections: AMC Dine-In Disney Springs 24 all-stadium-seating megaplex with Dolby Cinema and Dine-In Theatres (opened in 1996) (formerly AMC Pleasure Island 24) at Walt Disney World Resort and AMC Downtown Disney 12 at Disneyland Resort stadium-seating multiplex (opened in 2001, closed in 2018). The AMC CityWalk Stadium 19 located on Universal Studios Hollywood's CityWalk was relaunched after a renovation as "Universal Cinema, an AMC Theatre", on April 21, 2017. This location includes a seven-story IMAX screen with IMAX 70mm and IMAX Laser film, as well as "Black Box"-inspired auditoriums. It has one Christie Laser Projector per auditorium, with Dolby Atmos speakers. At Universal Orlando Resort's CityWalk, AMC had the Universal Cineplex 20 (also a former Loews Cineplex Entertainment / Cineplex Odeon), until September 2018 when it became a Cinemark.

AMC Independent (also known as AMCi) is an AMC film distribution program that aims to help independent films reach a theatrical audience. The program was announced in 2010 via the AMC Blog, and has been responsible for promoting and distributing all independent films to AMC theaters since.

In July 2021, AMC Theatres collaborated with American artist Chance the Rapper and his content production company House of Kicks in a trailblazing international distribution agreement to bring his concert film Magnificent Coloring World to cinemas internationally, marking the first time an individual recording artist distributed a film through AMC. This deal was revisited in 2023 when AMC partnered with Taylor Swift and Beyoncé to release their respective concert films Taylor Swift: The Eras Tour and Renaissance: A Film by Beyoncé. In all three cases, AMC acted as both the distributor and exhibitor of the films, bypassing the involvement of major film studios.

In January 2022, AMC Theatres started selling popcorn via food delivery, before entering supermarkets, in order to compensate for the COVID-19 pandemic-induced downturn in movie theaters.

In March 2022, AMC Theatres acquired a 22% share in Hycroft Mining, a gold and silver mining company in Nevada, which had also been experiencing a major liquidity crisis in the prior year.

== Acquisitions ==
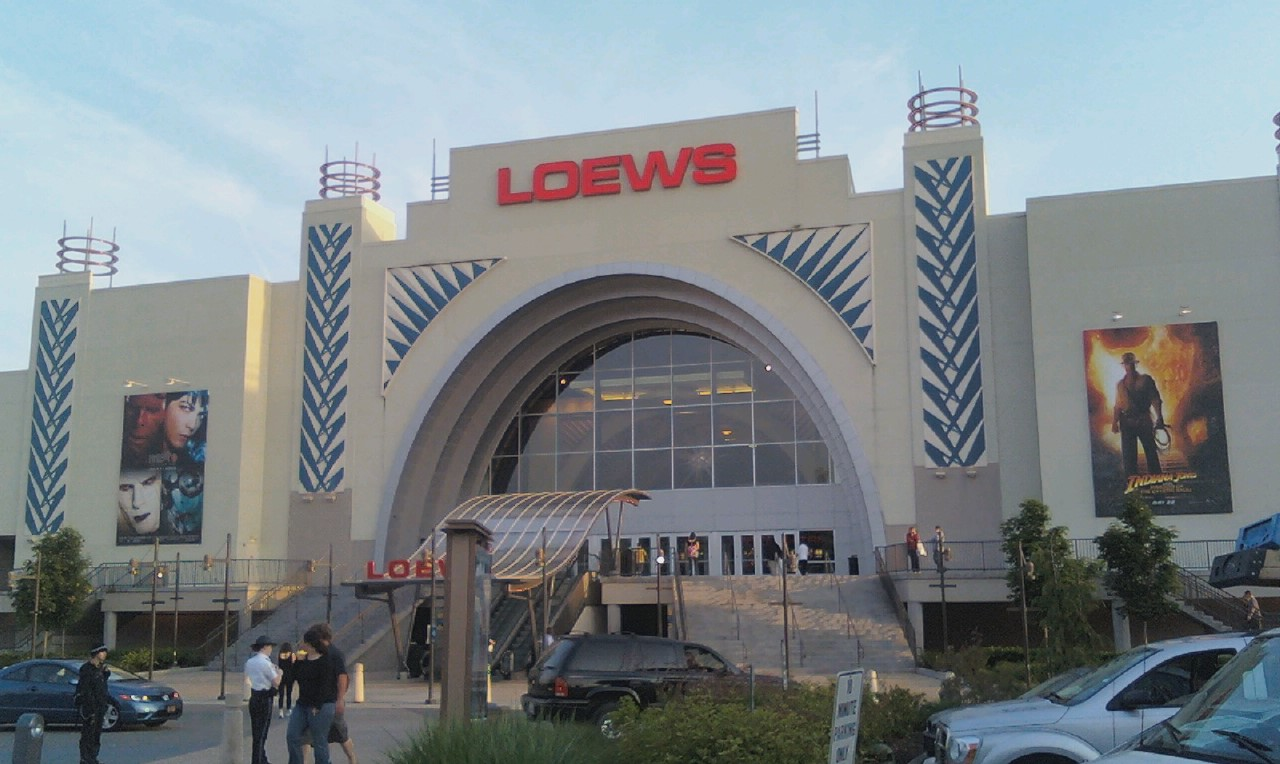
The Loews Alderwood 16 in Lynnwood, Washington had opened in March 2005 before the merger with AMC.

AMC has acquired multiple other theater chains throughout its history, resulting in a total of 385 theaters with 5,128 screens in six countries:

In March 2002, AMC purchased General Cinema Corporation, which added 66 theaters with 621 screens to the company assets, as well as Gulf States Theaters, which had five theaters with 68 screens in the greater New Orleans area. In late 2003, AMC acquired MegaStar Theatres, adding additional theaters in the Atlanta and Minneapolis–St. Paul markets.

On January 26, 2006, AMC merged with Loews Cineplex Entertainment to form AMC Entertainment; the deal brought into AMC's fold the entire Loews and American Cineplex chains, along with Magic Johnson Theatres (named after NBA player Magic Johnson) and Star Theatres, based in Metro Detroit. In 2010, AMC acquired Chicago-based Kerasotes Showplace Theatres, LLC for $275 million, combining the nation's second- and sixth-largest movie theater chains, except for the Showplace 14 in New Jersey and the Showplace ICON theatres.

In December 2015, Starplex Cinemas was sold to AMC for approximately $175 million. Most of these theaters now operate as AMC Classic as of July 2017.

On March 3, 2016, AMC announced its intent to acquire Carmike Cinemas in a $1.1 billion deal, pending regulatory and shareholder approval, which would allow it to overtake Regal as the United States' largest movie theater chain. The merger officially closed in December 2016.

In July 2016, UCI & Odeon Cinema Group was sold to AMC for approximately $1.21 billion, subject to European Commission approval. The acquisition was approved by the European Commission and the deal closed in November 2016.

In January 2017, Nordic Cinema Group, the leading movie theater operator in the Nordic and Baltic area, was sold to AMC for approximately $929 million. The deal was completed in March 2017 after AMC received clearance from the European Commission.

In July 2021, AMC Theatres announced that it would acquire the leases to the Americana at Brand in downtown Glendale and The Grove at Farmers Market in Los Angeles locations, formerly owned by Pacific Theatres, and that they would reopen in August as part of the AMC chain. The company has not ruled out acquiring the leases of other Pacific Theatres locations. In December 2021, AMC Theaters also announced that they had acquired the leases to the former Pacific Theaters location at Northridge Fashion Center in Northridge, Los Angeles and the Arclight Chicago 14 in Lincoln Park, Chicago, which both opened in 2022. In February 2022, AMC Theaters reached a deal to acquire the leases to the Arclight Montgomery 16 at Westfield Montgomery in Washington D.C. and the Westfield UTC mall's Arclight UTC 14 in La Jolla, with the former reopening that month and the latter in March of that year. During the same month, the company reached an agreement to acquire the lease to the Century 12 Evanston, previously owned by Cinemark Theatres, in Evanston, Illinois. In December 2022, the company reached a deal on the acquisition of the former Arclight Cinemas located at The Hub on Causeway in Boston, which reopened the following year.

In April 2022, AMC Theaters acquired seven Bow Tie Cinemas locations in Connecticut, New York, and Maryland.

== Controversies ==
The early versions of stadium-style seating as built by AMC in 1995 had auditoriums configured with an entrance to a flat area immediately in front of the screen for wheelchair users. People seated there had to either lean back or look up at an uncomfortable angle to see the screen. Able-bodied guests had to ascend the stairs to sit in the middle of the risers in order to have a comfortable line-of-sight with the screen. Since some wheelchair users have limited neck movement range, this configuration made AMC a popular target for Americans with Disabilities Act lawsuits. AMC subsequently solved the problem in newer theaters by building full-stadium auditoriums where the main entrance is through a ramp that emerges onto a platform in the middle of the risers so that wheelchair users can enjoy optimal line-of-sight. However, the U.S. Department of Justice sued the company, and obtained an order requiring AMC to retrofit over 1,990 screens in 95 multiplexes and megaplexes across the United States. The company successfully appealed the order to the U.S. Court of Appeals for the Ninth Circuit, which ruled on December 5, 2008 that the order was excessive and violated AMC's due process rights under the Constitution of the United States. AMC won by pointing out that the United States Access Board had not yet amended its guidelines for movie theaters to specifically require them to provide wheelchair guests sightlines that were as good as those from elevated risers, versus merely providing an unobstructed view of the screen. Therefore, the court ruled that it was unfair to AMC to retroactively hold it to a standard that did not exist at the time it began building stadium-style theaters.

AMC Entertainment Holdings, Inc., and some of its executives and underwriters of federal securities law charges had agreed to settle in 2017 for $18 million. The case charged AMC with defrauding investors about the financial health of the acquired theater operators and integration challenges, artificially inflating the stock prices of its secondary public offering (SPO).

When AMC announced that most of their theaters would reopen in mid-July 2020 during the COVID-19 pandemic, the initial announcement said masks would be recommended but not mandatory. AMC CEO Adam Aron stated, "We are strongly encouraging our guests to wear masks all across the country, but not requiring it" and "We did not want to be drawn into a political controversy... We thought it might be counterproductive if we forced mask wearing on those people who believe strongly that it is not necessary." After massive pushback from the public, Aron changed the policy to require masks: "This announcement prompted an intense and immediate outcry from our customers, and it is clear from this response that we did not go far enough on the usage of masks," Aron said.

== Gallery ==
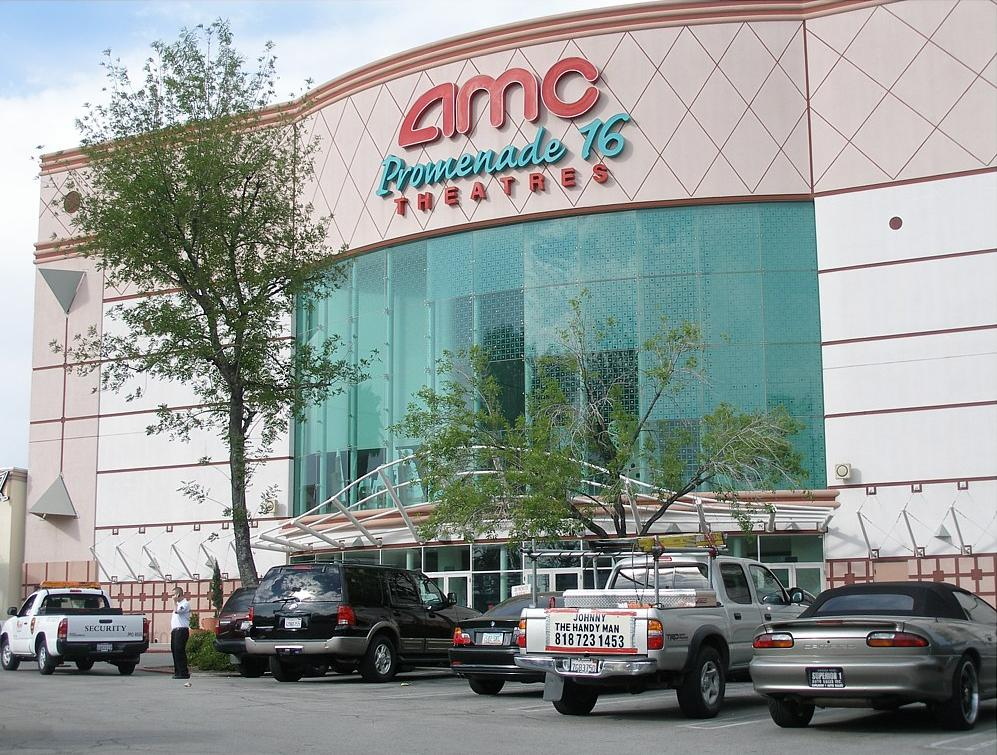
AMC Promenade 16 megaplex in the Woodland Hills area of Los Angeles, California, which closed on June 1, 2022 and replaced by AMC Dine-In Topanga 12 in Canoga Park, which opened on the next day

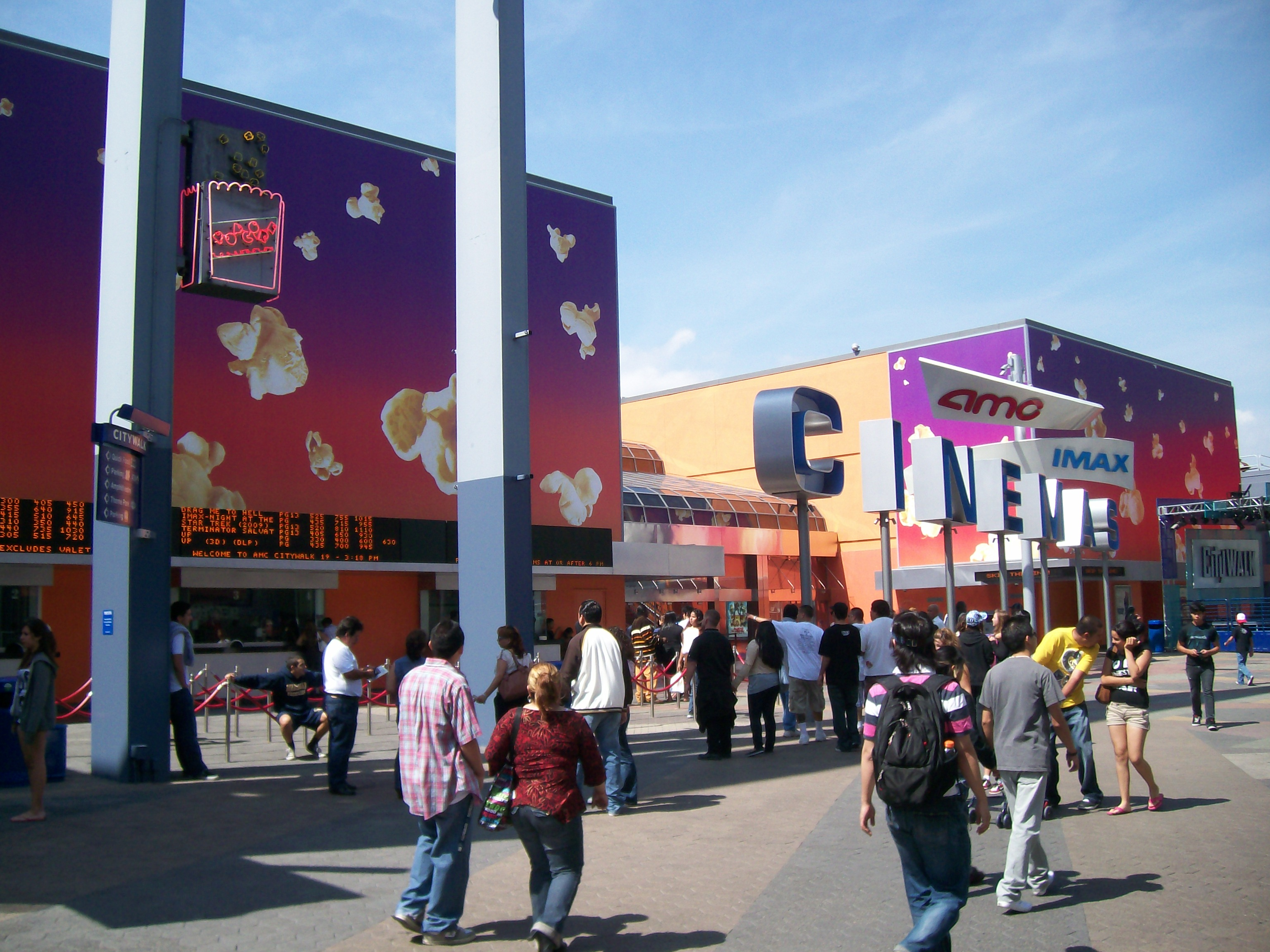
The original appearance of AMC Citywalk Stadium 19 with IMAX in Universal City, California. It was rebranded and renovated as "Universal Cinema AMC at CityWalk Hollywood" in 2017.

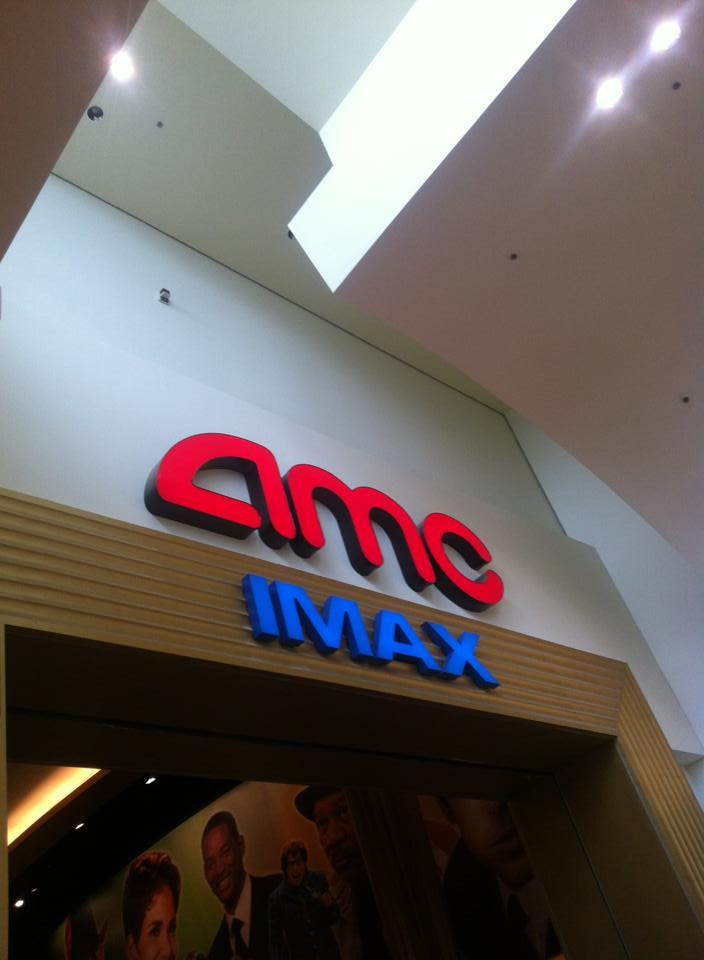
The mall entrance to AMC Garden State 16 with IMAX at Westfield Garden State Plaza in Paramus, New Jersey

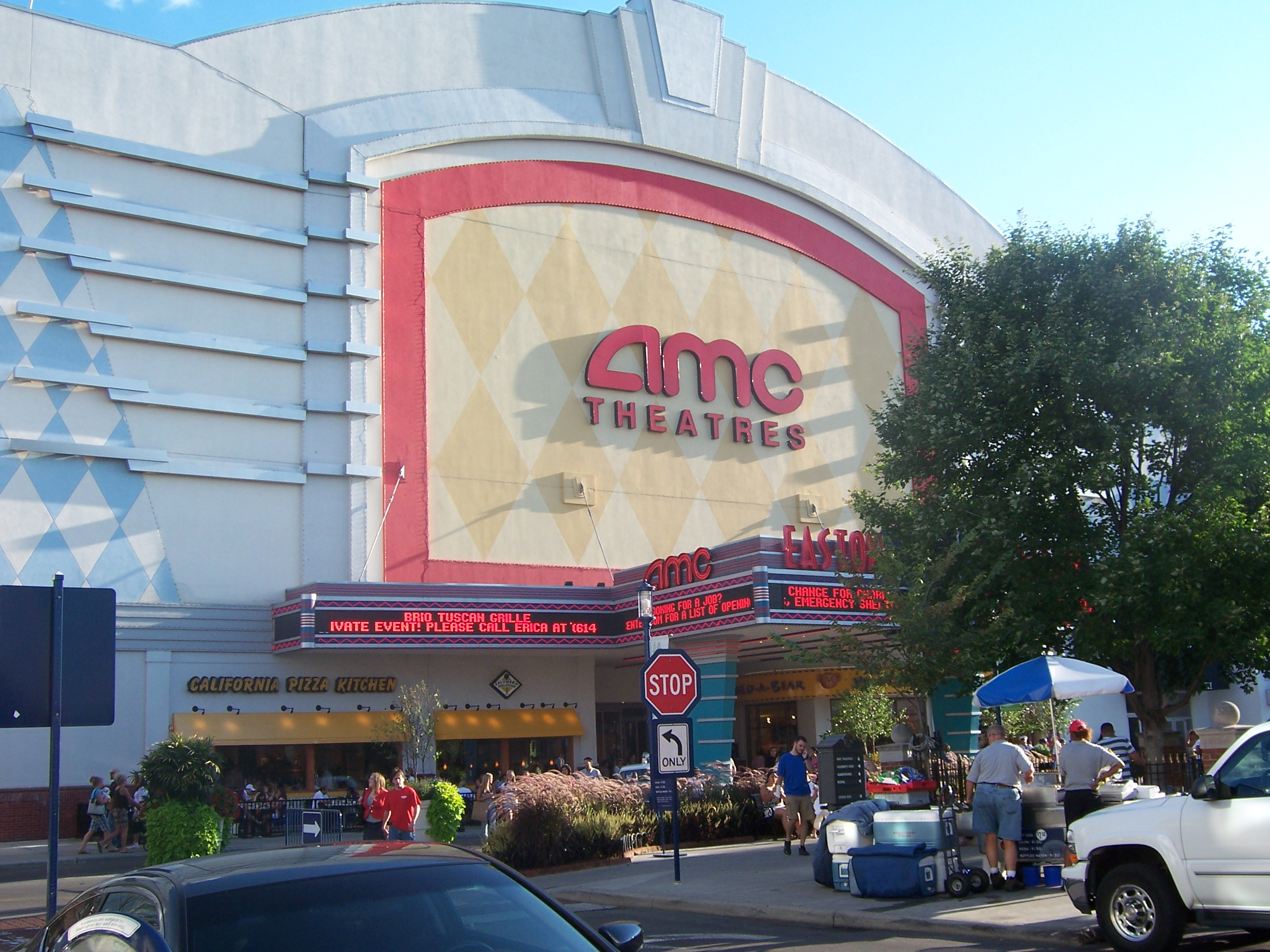
AMC 30 at Easton Town Center in Columbus, Ohio in 2008. This was converted into AMC Dine-In Easton Town Center 30 in 2012.

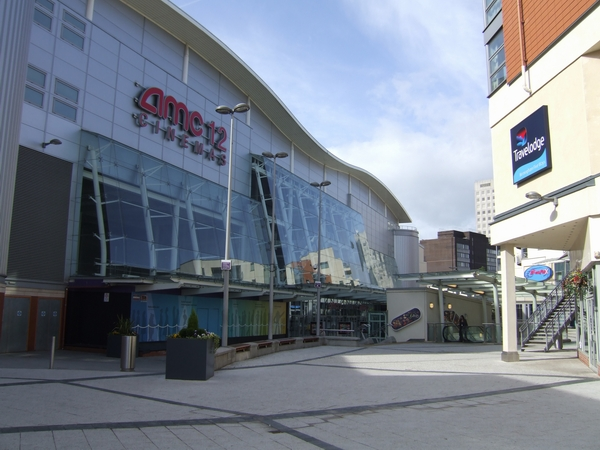
AMC Broadway Plaza 12 in Birmingham, United Kingdom in 2007. This location became Odeon Birmingham Broadway Plaza in 2012 and became Odeon Luxe Birmingham Broadway Plaza in 2018.

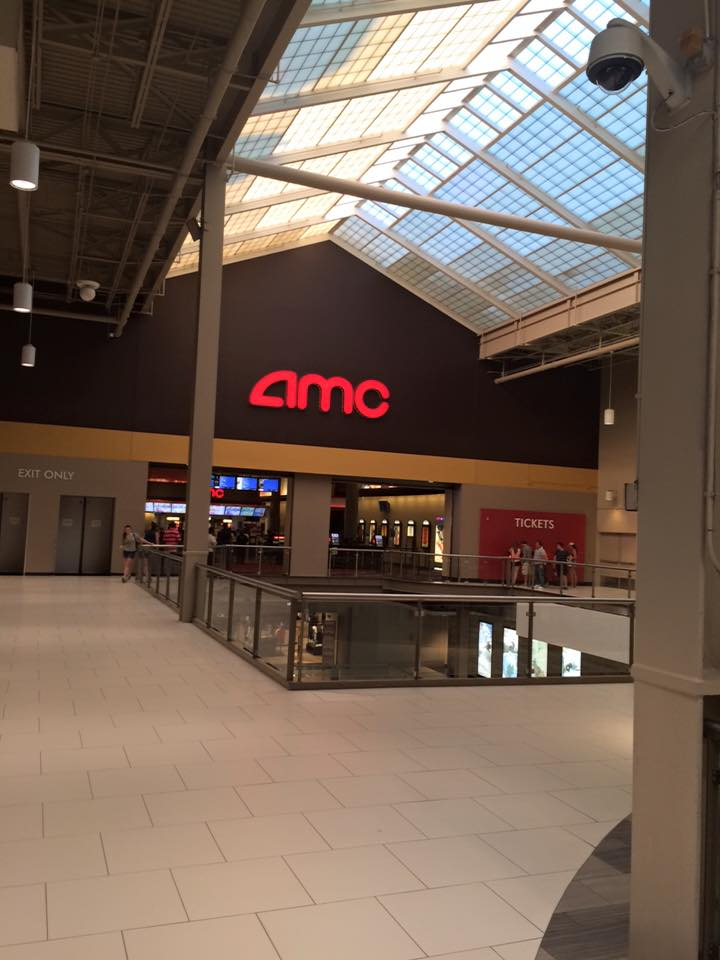
AMC Palisades 21 (formerly a Loews, later branded as an "AMC Loews" before renovation) at Palisades Center shopping mall in West Nyack, New York

== See also ==
- Cineworld
- List of movie theater chains
