= Odeon Cinemas Group =

Largest cinema operator in Europe

Odeon Cinemas Group Limited
- Formerly: AMC (UK) Acquisition Limited (June–December 2016)
- Type: Subsidiary
- Industry: Cinema
- Founded: June 22, 2016; 10 years ago
- Founder: AMC Theatres
- Headquarters: London, England, UK
- Area served: Finland; Germany; Ireland; Italy; Norway; Portugal; Spain; Sweden; United Kingdom
- Parent: AMC Theatres
- Subsidiaries: Nordic Cinema Group; Odeon Cinemas; UCI Cinemas
- Website: odeoncinemasgroup.com

Odeon Cinemas Group Limited is Europe's largest cinema operator. Through subsidiaries it has over 360 cinemas, with 2900 screens in 14 countries in Europe, 120 cinemas with 960 screens are in the UK. It receives more than 2.2 million guests per week.

Odeon Cinemas Group is a wholly owned subsidiary of AMC Theatres. The company has three main subsidiaries, Nordic Cinema Group, UCI Cinemas, and Odeon Cinemas. Nordic Cinema Group in turn owns Finnkino and its subsidiary Forum Cinemas.

== History ==
The company was incorporated in London, England, on 22 June 2016, as part of a $1.2 billion takeover of Odeon Cinemas and United Cinemas International by AMC Theatres. The deal left Odeon Cinemas as a wholly owned subsidiary of Odeon Cinemas Group. AMC claimed after the acquisition that it was the "largest movie exhibition company in the world".

David Anderson was appointed as chief commercial officer on 27 October 2017, replacing Ian Shepherd. When he was appointed, the group managing director was Mark Way and the chief operating officer was Jan Bernhardsson. The company received the 2018 CIPD People Management Awards for "Best international HR initiative". Having won in the "Talent Management" category in 2017.

In March 2018, Reuters reported that AMC was working with Citi to potentially float the company on the London Stock Exchange in a $2 billion IPO.

On March 17, 2020, all of its UK-area theatres temporarily closed due to the COVID-19 pandemic.

== Position in group ==
AMC Theatres
Star Theatres	Kerasotes Theatres	Odeon Cinemas Group	Carmike Cinemas
Starplex Cinemas
Nordic Cinema Group	United Cinemas International	Odeon Cinemas
Finnkino	Filmstaden
