= Odeon Cinema, Harrogate =

Cinema in Harrogate, North Yorkshire, England

Odeon Cinema
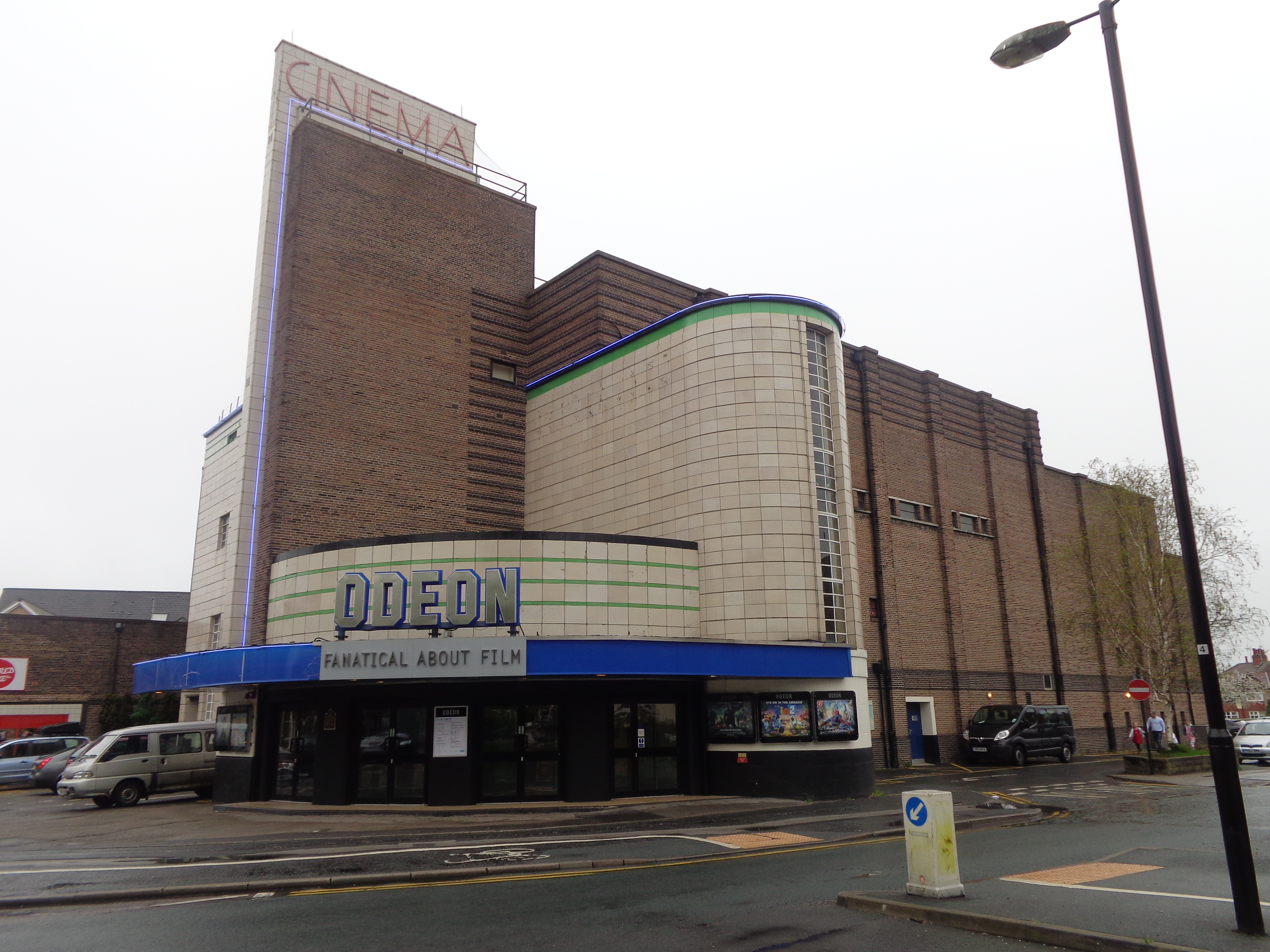
- The building in 2014
- Interactive map of the Odeon Cinema area

General information
- Architectural style: Art Deco
- Location: Harrogate, United Kingdom
- Coordinates: 53°59′32.83″N 1°32′08.01″W
- Opened: 1936

Design and construction
- Architects: Harry Weedon, Cecil Clavering

Website
- www.odeon.co.uk/cinemas/harrogate

The Odeon Cinema is a cinema in Harrogate, in North Yorkshire, England. Built in 1936, it is notable for its Art Deco style. It is a Grade II listed building.

== History and description ==
The cinema is situated at the junction of East Parade and Station Avenue.

It was built as one of the Odeon Cinemas of Oscar Deutsch. The architect was Cecil Clavering of the Harry Weedon partnership, and the style, by the same firm, was first produced for the Odeon, Kingstanding. The Harrogate Odeon was built as a copy of the Odeon Cinema, Sutton Coldfield, opened in April 1936; the listing text for that building describes that the foyer, staircase and auditorium are "each defined as a separate block in a complex, carefully massed and expressionistic composition" inspired by the Titania-Palast in Berlin, built in 1928. Further Odeon Cinemas in similar style were built in York and Scarborough.

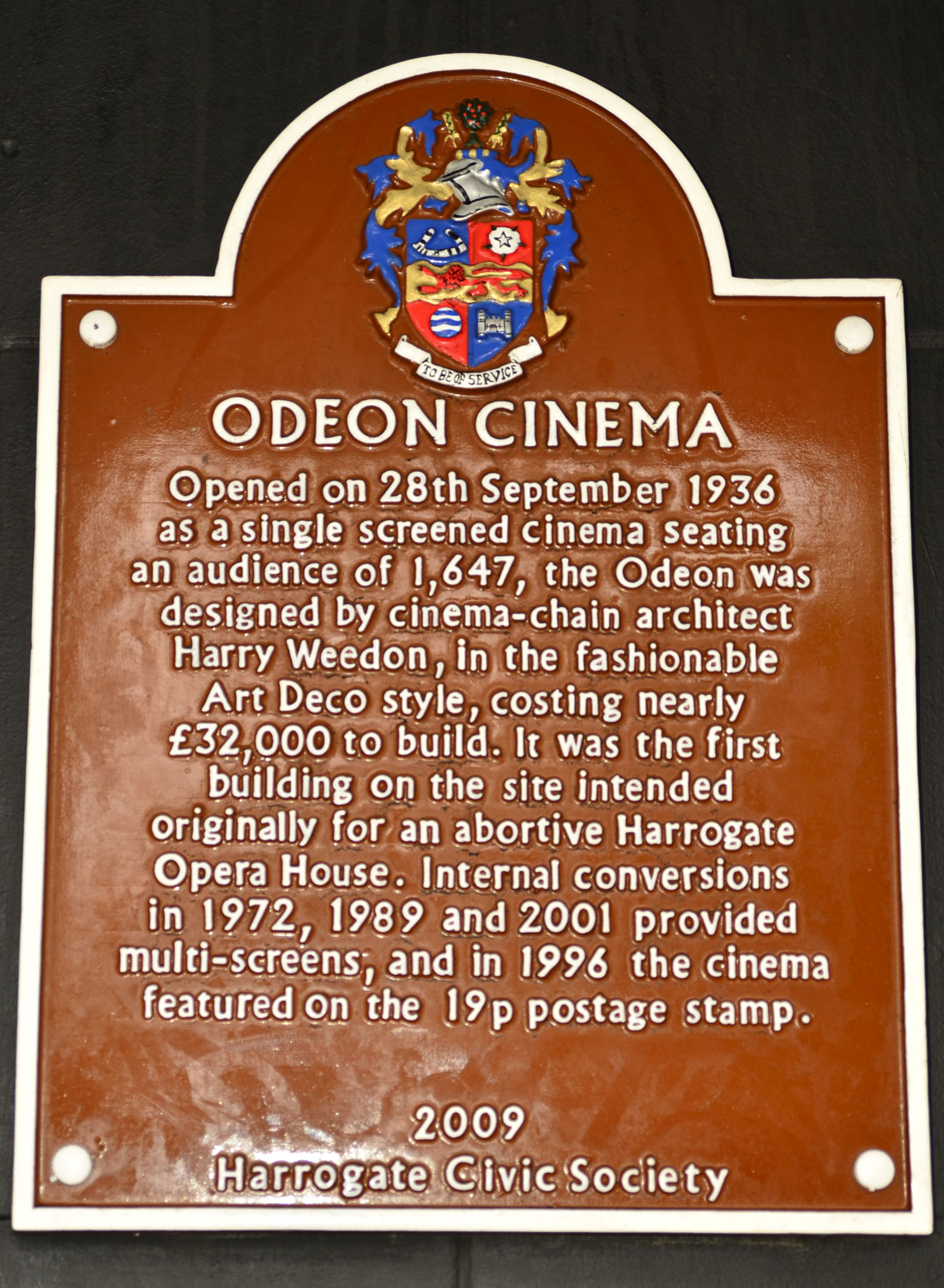
Plaque placed by the Harrogate Civic Society

On its opening on 28 September 1936, the cinema seated 1,049 in the stalls and 598 in the circle; the first film shown was Where's Sally? It was converted in 1972 to house three screens, with 532 seats in the front stalls and former circle for one screen, and 108 seats each for two screens in the former rear stalls. It was further converted in 1989 to four screens, and later to five screens.

A heritage plaque was placed on the building in 2009 by the Harrogate Civic Society.

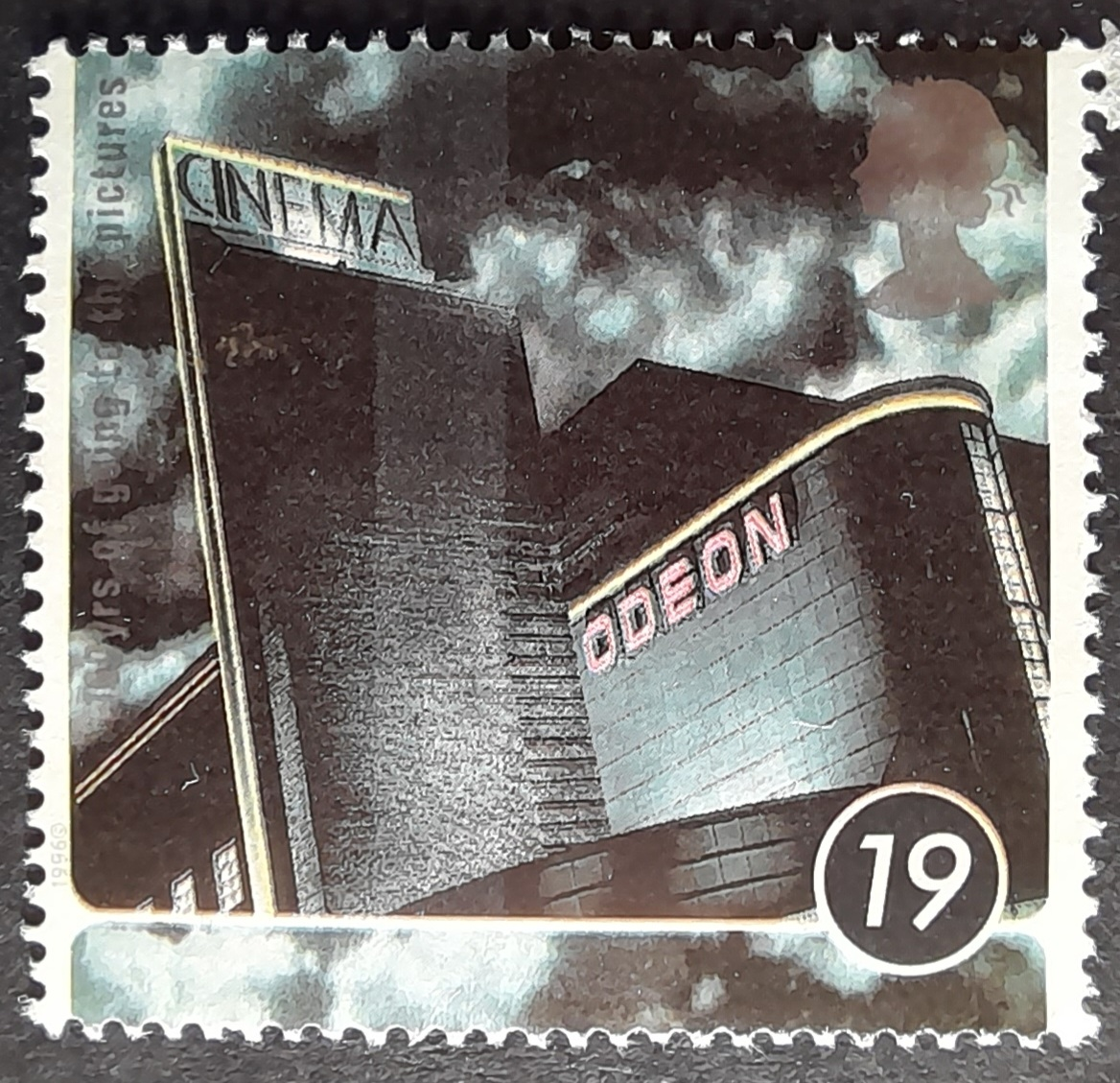
1996 Centenary of Cinema 2nd class stamp from set of five. Cinema design after J. C. Clavering architect.

== See also ==
- Listed buildings in Harrogate (High Harrogate Ward)
