= Royal Cinema, Sutton Coldfield =

Cinema in Birmingham, England

Royal Cinema
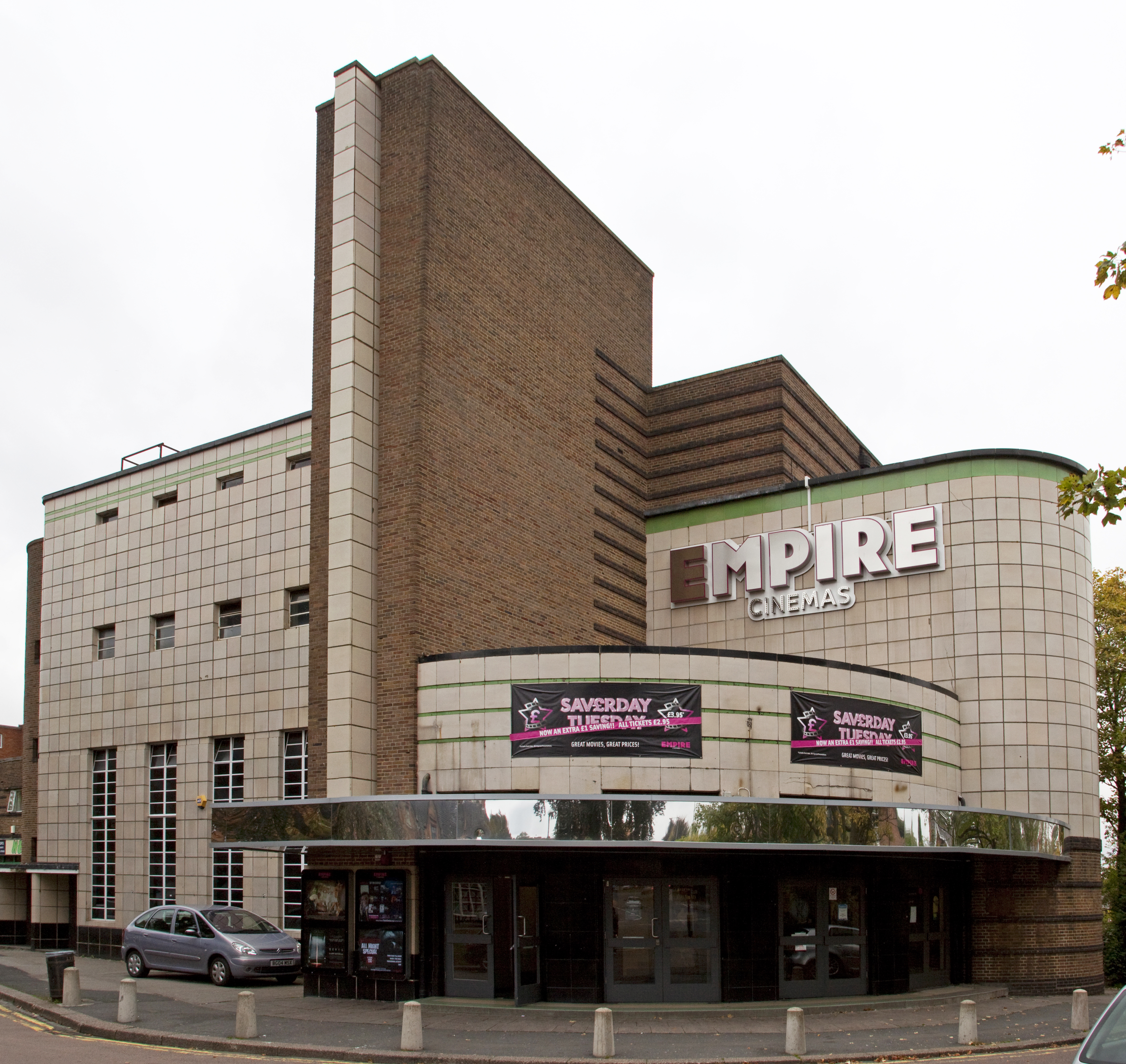
- The building in 2010

General information
- Architectural style: Art Deco
- Location: Sutton Coldfield
- Country: United Kingdom
- Coordinates: 52°33′23.868″N 1°49′33.064″W grid reference SP 11904 95435
- Opened: 1936

Design and construction
- Architect(s): Harry Weedon, Cecil Clavering

Website
- royalcinemas.co.uk

The Royal Cinema, originally the Odeon Cinema and later the Empire Cinema, is a cinema in Maney, Sutton Coldfield in West Midlands, England. Built in 1936, it is notable for its Art Deco style. It is a Grade II listed building. After the Empire closed in 2020, it opened after refurbishment as the Royal Cinema in July 2024.

== History ==
=== The Odeon ===
The cinema is situated on Maney Corner, at the junction of Holland Road with the A5127 Birmingham Road.

It was built as one of the Odeon Cinemas of Oscar Deutsch. The architect was Cecil Clavering of the Harry Weedon partnership. The style, by the same firm, was first produced for the Odeon, Kingstanding, and further Odeon Cinemas in similar style were built in York, Harrogate and Scarborough. The listing text describes that the foyer, staircase and auditorium are "each defined as a separate block in a complex, carefully massed and expressionistic composition" inspired by the Titania-Palast in Berlin, built in 1928.

The cinema opened on 18 April 1936; the first film shown was First a Girl. It seated 1028 in the stalls and 572 in the balcony. From April 1972 there were three screens: one was viewed from the balcony, and two, each seating 132, were created in the rear stalls below. A fourth screen was created in 1987 in the former front stalls.

=== The Empire ===
In 2006, Empire Cinemas took over this and several other Odeon Cinemas, and it was renamed the Empire Cinema. It closed in March 2020, due to the COVID-19 pandemic; after briefly re-opening later in the year, it closed in November 2020.

=== The Royal ===
The cinema was bought by PDJ Cinemas in 2023, and after refurbishment, including new screens, sound systems, seating and Art Deco features, it opened in July 2024 as the Royal Cinema. There are four screens, seating 456 in total; the largest, Screen 1, in the former circle, seats about 200.
