= Odeon Luxe Leicester Square =

Cinema in London, England

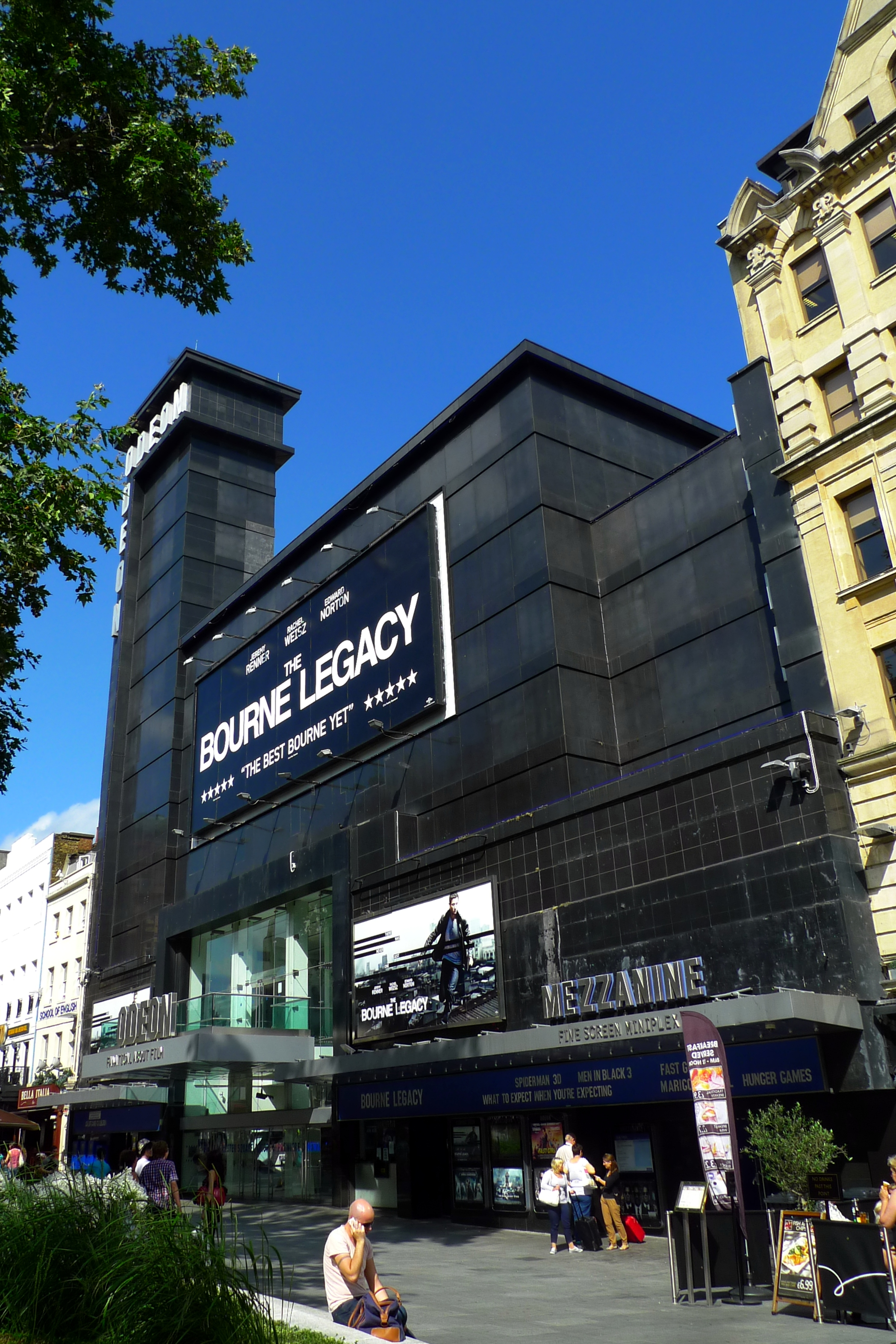
- Odeon Luxe Leicester Square in 2012

- Location within Central London Location within the United Kingdom
- Former names: Odeon Leicester Square
- Address: 24–26 Leicester Square
- Location: London; WC2H 7JY
- Coordinates: 51.51056°N 0.12917°W
- Owner: Odeon Cinemas
- Seating type: Main Screen (Dolby Cinema); 800 Seats Screen 2; 35 Seats Screen 3; 42 Seats Screen 4; 41 Seats
- Capacity: 950 total
- Type: Cinema
- Public transit: Leicester Square; Charing Cross

Construction
- Opened: 2 November 1937
- Renovated: 21 January – 21 December 2018
- Cost: £232,755
- Architects: Harry Weedon; Andrew Mather

The Odeon Luxe Leicester Square is a prominent cinema building in the West End of London. Built in the Art Deco style and completed in 1937, the building has been continually altered in response to developments in cinema technology, and was the first Dolby Cinema in the United Kingdom.

The cinema occupies the centre of the eastern side of Leicester Square in London, featuring a black polished granite facade and 120 feet (37 m) high tower displaying its name. Blue neon outlines the exterior of the building at night. It was built to be the flagship of Oscar Deutsch's Odeon Cinemas chain and still holds that position today. It hosts numerous European and world film premieres, including the annual Royal Film Performance.

== History ==
The Odeon cinema building was completed by Sir Robert McAlpine in 1937 to the design of Harry Weedon and Andrew Mather on the site of Nevill's Victorian Turkish baths and the adjoining Alhambra Theatre, a large music hall dating from the 1850s. The site cost £550,000, and the cinema took seven months to build, at a cost of £232,755, with 2116 seats. The opening night was Tuesday 2 November 1937; the film shown that night was The Prisoner of Zenda.

The interior was an art-deco auditorium, with a ribbed ceiling and sidewalls, featuring concealed strip lighting in coves, and two bas relief sculptures of naked nymphs were positioned on the front splay walls, as if leaping towards the screen. All the seats were covered in a faux-leopard skin material. A modernisation in 1967 removed many of the original features, with all of the ribbed plasterwork from the balcony to the proscenium replaced by smooth finishes. A refurbishment in 1998 included new versions of some lost details, including the figures, and seating upholstery pattern.

The UK's first widescreen (screen ratio 1.66:1) was installed and premiered on 14 May 1953; the film shown was Tonight We Sing. The British public debut of CinemaScope (screen ratio 2.55:1) followed on 19 November 1953 with the quasi-biblical epic, The Robe. (The first cinema to install CinemaScope in the UK was the Odeon Tottenham Court Road on 9 June 1953, but it was not open to the public until later).

The theatre's chief engineer, Nigel Wolland, was appointed MBE for services to the film industry in 2007. The theatre's general manager, Chris Hilton, was appointed MBE for services to the film industry in 2010.

After Nigel Wolland's retirement in 2006, Mark Nice was appointed the cinema's chief engineer. Mark Nice was later promoted to the position of Odeon company engineer with Toni Purvis and Michael Mannix assuming the role of Operations Manager Digital.

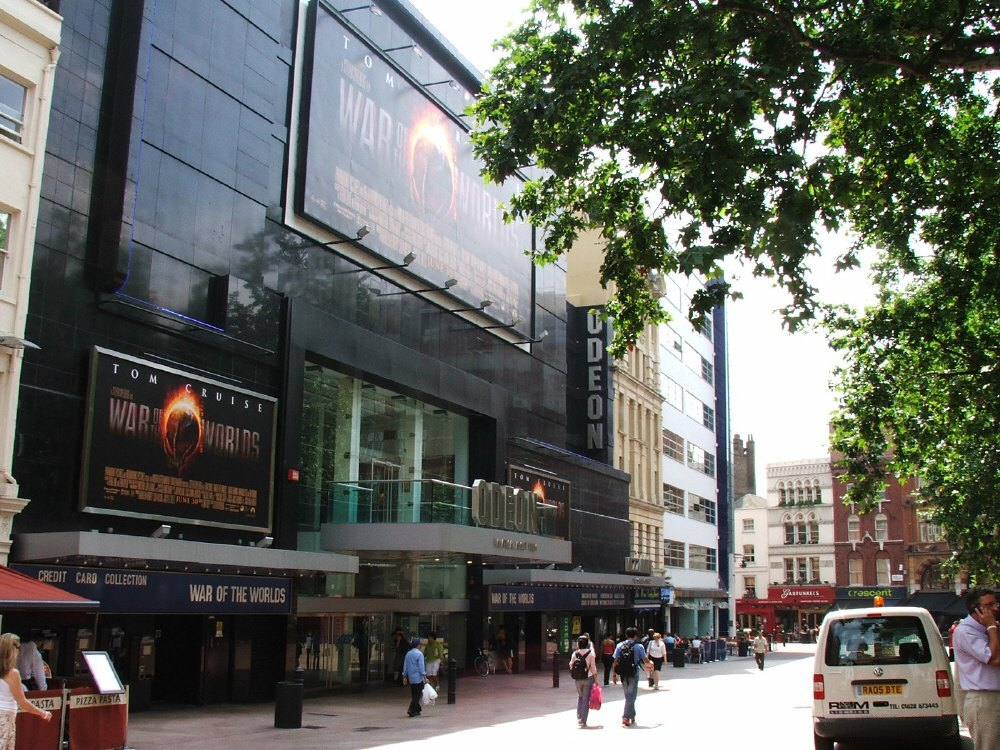
Black polished granite facade

The first Dolby Cinema system to be installed in the UK is at the Odeon in Leicester Square. This introduced a combination of Dolby Vision dual-laser projection system and a Dolby Atmos sound system.

== Screens 2 – 5 ==
Five screens, each seating between fifty and sixty patrons, were added in April 1990 in what was once an alleyway running alongside the main house. The screens were originally known as Odeon Mezzanine and were renamed Odeon Studios in 2012. Following the refurbishment in 2018, the number of screens was reduced to four with reduced capacity and renamed as Screens 2 – 5.

== Recent developments ==
In 2018 Odeon undertook a full refurbishment at a projected cost of £10–15 million, which saw the building retained as a single-screen cinema with stalls and circle levels, with the stated intention to maintain its character. The cinema closed on 10 January 2018 with an anticipated reopening in time for the BFI London Film Festival in October—which it failed to meet. The cinema reopened on 21 December 2018 rebranded as part of the Odeon Luxe chain, with a reduced capacity in luxury seats, an enhanced concession offering, and the first commercial Dolby Cinema screen to open in the UK.

== See also ==
- Odeon Cinemas, the British cinema chain
- Odeon Marble Arch, a former cinema also located in London's West End
- Odeon Luxe West End, a second cinema on the south side of Leicester Square
- Scenes in the Square, which includes a statue of Batman on the roof of the cinema

== Sources ==
- Guide to British Theatres 1750–1950, John Earl and Michael Sell pp. 128 (Theatres Trust, 2000) ISBN 0-7136-5688-3
