= Maney =

Area of Sutton Coldfield, Birmingham, England

Coordinates: 52.5571°N 1.8259°W

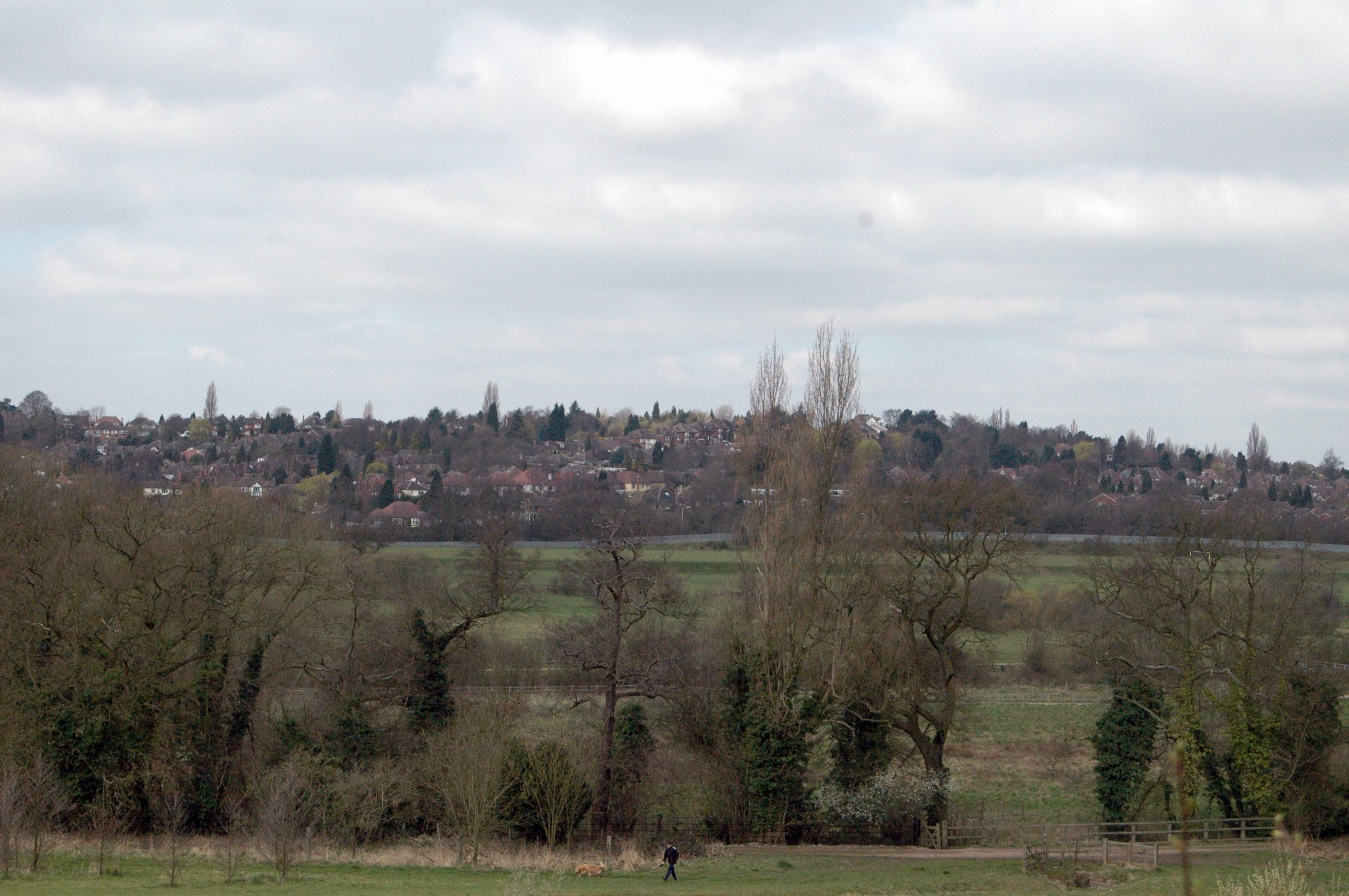
Maney viewed from the Walmley side of New Hall Valley.

Maney is an area of Sutton Coldfield, Birmingham, England. It is situated close to the town centre of Sutton Coldfield and is also near Wylde Green and Walmley. The main thoroughfare is Birmingham Road, which runs through Maney.

== Facilities ==
Sutton Coldfield's only remaining cinema is located in Maney. It was operated by Odeon Cinemas from 1936 until 2006, when it was acquired by Empire Cinemas. It was officially opened on April 18, 1936, by Councillor W. A. Perry, the Mayor of Sutton Coldfield. Upon its opening, it had a seating capacity of 1,636 and was designed by Harry Weedon. It was put in direct competition of the 'Empress Cinema' on the Parade in Sutton Coldfield town centre which had reopened after reconstruction work in February of that year. The 'Empress Cinema' shut down in the 1970s and the site is now the location of Sutton Coldfield Library.

Beeches Walk, Birmingham Road, offers a range of shops and restaurants. This parade stands on the site of a large Victorian house 'The Beeches'. In 1929, over 6 acres (24,000 m^{2}) of paddock at the rear of the house was acquired by Compulsory Purchase Order for the building of Sutton Coldfield Grammar School for Girls. In 1932, the old house was demolished and despite some local opposition retail development was permitted.

St Peter's Church is located on Maney Hill Road. The foundation stone was laid on June 22, 1904, by Rt. Hon. William Henry Lord Leigh and was completed in 1905. It is the parish church for the parish of St Peter.

Nearby are the local football team, Sutton Coldfield Town F.C., Maney Hill Primary School, Plantsbrook School, and the Sutton Coldfield campus of Birmingham Metropolitan College.

== History ==
14th century references to this ancient hamlet appear in the National Archives. A windmill was present in the area during the time of Bishop Vesey as a result of the high elevation of Maney Hill in comparison to the other lower lying areas of Sutton.

The area contains several buildings of some antiquity having Grade II listed status. These include:

- The Smithy, 78 Birmingham Road; originally a stone built cottage based on a 15th-century cruck frame construction, now used as an art gallery.
- The Stone House, St Peters Close, which is thought to be one of the very few remaining stone cottages built by John Vesey, Bishop of Exeter in about 1530.
- "Vesey Manor" at 62/64 Birmingham Road, built as two stone cottages in the 16th century, later converted to a farmhouse, and in the late 19th century enlarged and provided with its current frontage.

In World War II, a bomb exploded in the middle of Maney Hill Road. The Beatles played a concert on the 1 February 1963 in St Peter's Church Hall.

In the 1921, Maney Corner in Maney became the first place in the world where a centre white line was painted in a road. This was as a result of reckless driving and numerous collisions on the road.
