= Apollo Cinemas =

British cinema chain

Apollo Cinemas was a locally focused, independently owned multiplex cinema operator in the United Kingdom. It showed mainstream blockbusters, independent film and onscreen entertainment such as music concerts, sporting events, opera, and ballet.

Apollo had 14 cinemas nationwide, with plans to open new sites in Brentwood and Bicester.

On 25 January 2013, the acquisition by Vue Cinemas was completed with sites transferred to the Vue brand over the coming months. 4 sites were sold to Reel Cinemas with the final site sold to Curzon Cinemas.

Apollo was the first fully digital circuit in the UK, beginning its transition away from 35mm print in 2009. The estate is equipped with Sony 4K Digital Cinema projection, Real D screens and Dolby Surround sound. This equipment produces a picture detail at the highest level that the human eye can see.

== History ==
Once part of the large Apollo Leisure Group, Apollo Cinemas has a heritage in entertainment, live music and theatre. After Leisure was sold to Clear Channel Entertainment, Apollo Cinemas was formed in April 2002 to purchase the UK cinema assets back. The acquisition was financed by Mrs Anita Gregg and HSBC. It comprised 11 cinemas and substantial investment led to the opening of new cinemas in London (2004), Fareham and Stroud (both 2005), Altrincham (2006) and Redditch (2007), together with significant improvement to the original cinema estate.

Apollo Cinemas Ltd was the UK's largest independent chain and accounts for around 1.25% of total UK box office admissions. It was the UK's 6th largest cinema operator in terms of number of screens with 83 screens over 14 sites.

On 11 May 2012 it was announced that Vue Cinemas were to buy Apollo Cinemas for £20m. On 25 January 2013, the sale was cleared by the OFT after Vue agreed to sell 4 sites to Reel Cinemas.

== Escape Magazine ==
Escape is a free bi-monthly film magazine published for and given away at Apollo Cinemas. It features information and posters for upcoming films at Apollo Cinemas. The magazine was also available to read on the Apollo website.

== Former locations ==
Due to the acquisition of Apollo Cinemas by Vue Cinemas, a number of sites were sold to Reel Cinemas.

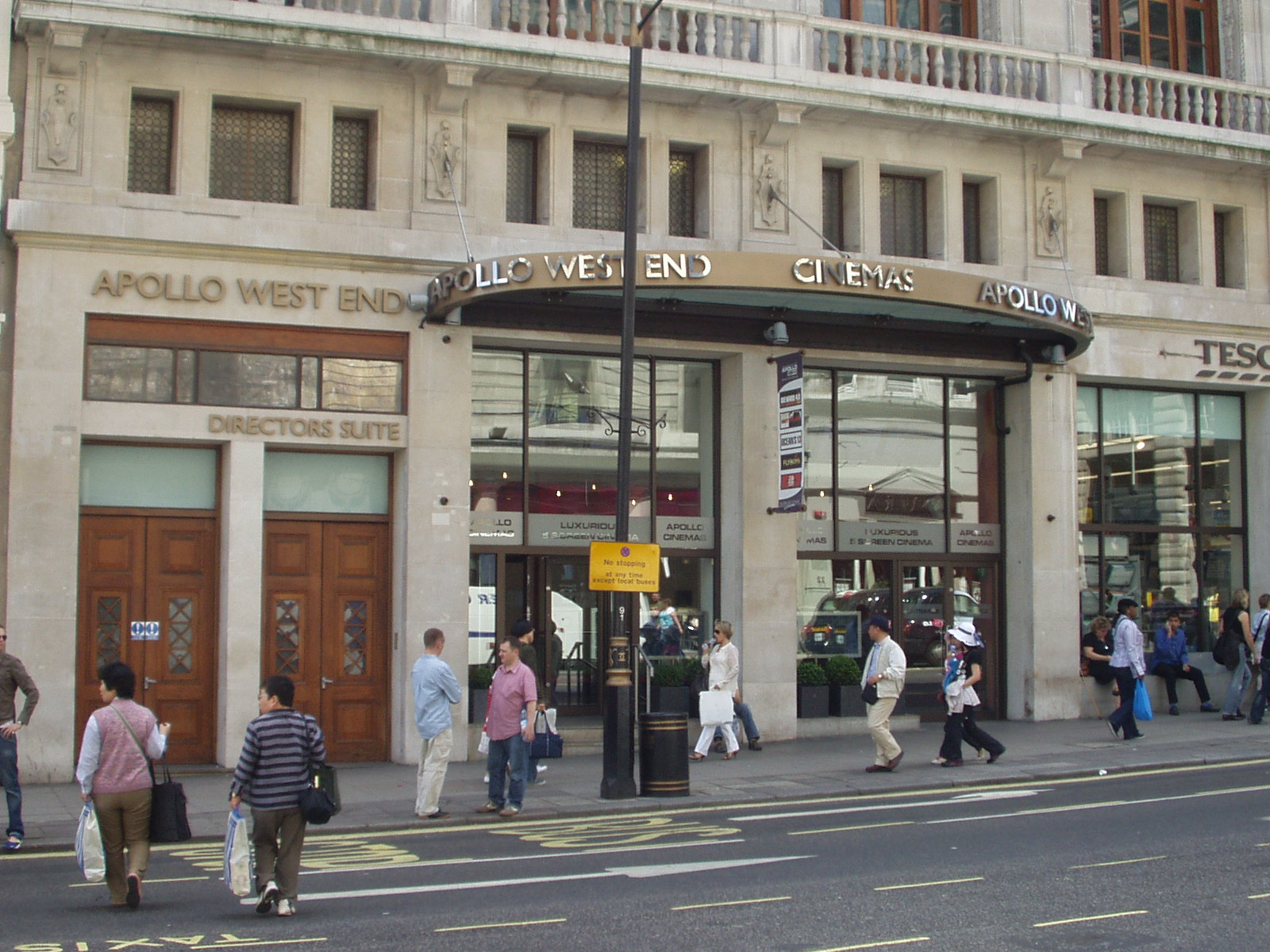
Apollo Cinemas, Piccadilly Circus, London

Town/City	Country	Screens	Sony Digital Cinema 4K 3D Screens	Sold to
Altrincham, Greater Manchester	England	6	Yes	Vue
Barrow-in-Furness, Cumbria	England	6	Yes	Vue
Burnley, Lancashire	England	9		Reel
Carmarthen, Carmarthenshire	Wales	6	Yes	Vue
Fareham, Hampshire	England	5		Reel
Leamington Spa, Warwickshire	England	6	Yes	Vue
Morecambe, Lancashire	England	4		Reel
Piccadilly Circus, Westminster, London	England	5	Yes	Vue
Port Talbot, Neath Port Talbot	Wales	6		Reel
Redditch, Worcestershire	England	7	Yes	Vue
Rhyl, Denbighshire	Wales	5	Yes	Vue
Stafford, Staffordshire	England	3	Yes	Vue
Stroud, Gloucestershire	England	6	Yes	Vue
Torbay, Devon	England	9	Yes	Vue
