= Odeon Luxe West End =

Cinema in London, England

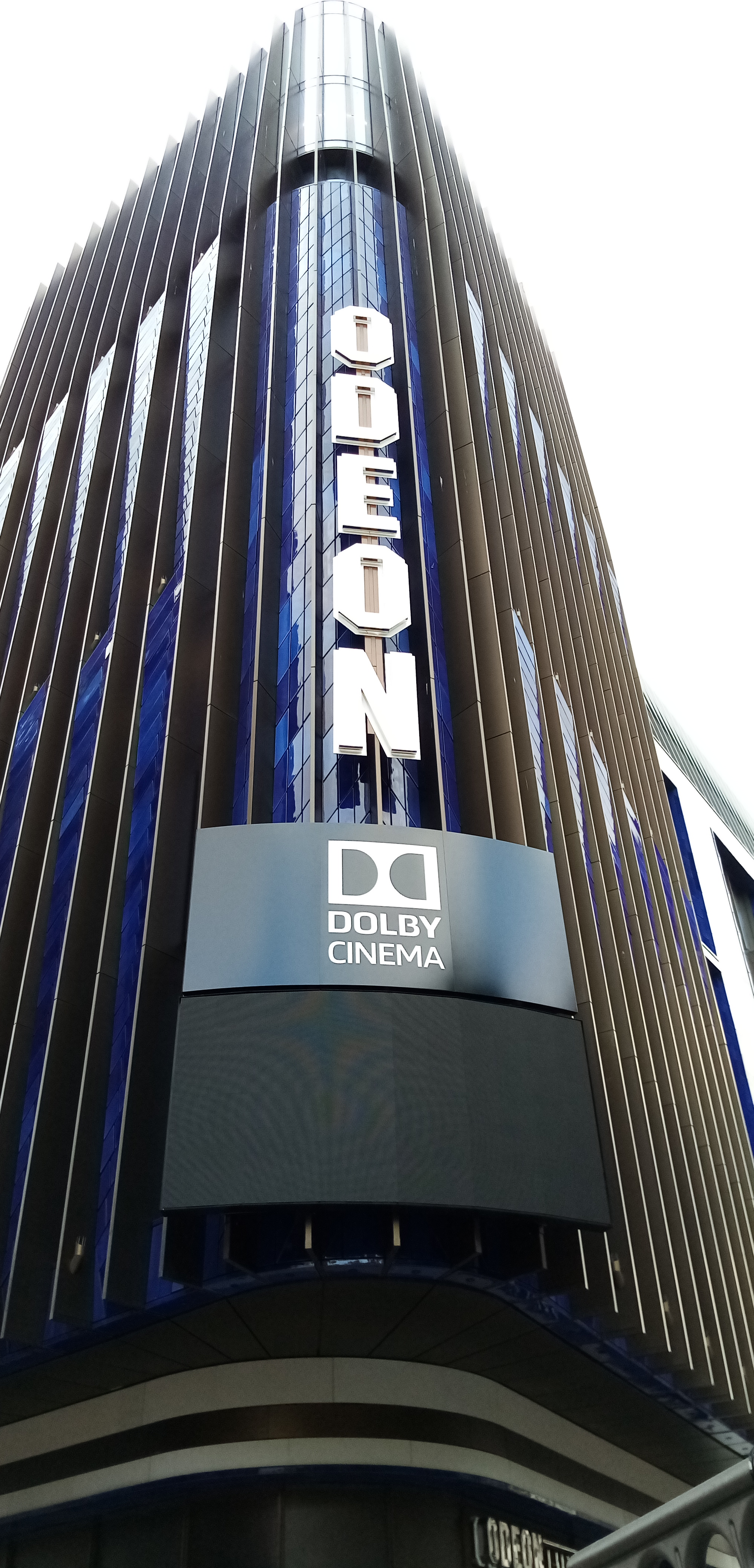
- Odeon Luxe West End (2021)

- Location within Greater London
- Former names: Leicester Square Theatre; Odeon West End

General information
- Architectural style: Art Deco
- Classification: Cinema
- Location: London, 38 Leicester Square, London, England
- Coordinates: 51.5099°N 0.1303°W
- Opened: 19 December 1930
- Renovated: April 1968 - December 1968; July 1991 - October 1991; April 2015 - September 2021
- Client: Odeon Cinemas
- Owner: Edwardian Group

Design and construction
- Architect: Andrew Mather (1930)
- Architecture firm: Arnold Dick Associates (1968 rebuild); Arup (2021 rebuild)
- Known for: Premieres; Public Screenings; Cast & Crew Screenings; London Film Festival

Other information
- Seating type: Recliners
- Seating capacity: Screen 1 (Dolby): 168 seats (166 recliners, 2 wheelchair spaces); Screen 2: 72 seats (70 recliners, 2 wheelchair spaces)
- Parking: Offsite

The Odeon Luxe West End is a two-screen cinema on the south side of Leicester Square, London. It has historically been used for smaller film premieres and hosting the annual BFI London Film Festival. The site is on an adjacent side of the square to the much larger flagship Odeon Luxe Leicester Square.

Odeon Cinemas sold the building to three Irish investors in 2006, who continued to lease it. In 2012, it was bought by the Radisson Edwardian hotel group. It closed as a cinema on 1 January 2015. After extensive asbestos removal, the entire site was demolished the same year.

It reopened in September 2021 as an Odeon Luxe cinema, following a £300 million redevelopment of the site that also includes a luxury hotel. It is London's second Dolby Cinema.

== History ==
=== 1930–1940 ===
The Leicester Square Theatre was built for actor/film star Jack Buchanan and impresario Walter Gibbons. Buchanan had a large two-storey apartment built on top of the theatre, which he occupied until it was damaged by bombing in late October 1940. NatWest later occupied this as their main London offices spread over two floors, but vacated it in the early 2000s and was damaged by squatters a few years later with graffiti everywhere, ceiling tiles punched out and carpet ripped up.

Designed by architect Andrew Mather, the Leicester Square Theatre was intended as a live theatre, but there were problems acquiring adjacent properties and the stage space proved insufficient. It opened on 19 December 1930 as a dual-purpose live theatre/cinema with 1,760 seats in stalls, dress circle and balcony levels. There were three boxes adjacent to each side of the proscenium at dress circle level, but these were only used during live performances. The foyer walls were decorated with polished black marble. The first operators were Warner Brothers and the opening programme was the Warner Brothers two-tone Technicolor film Viennese Nights starring Vivienne Segal supported by a stage dance production including Balliol and Merton and the Victoria Girls. It was equipped with a Wurlitzer 3 Manual/10 Rank theatre organ.

It was taken over in March 1931 by RKO Radio Pictures. In July 1931, Gracie Fields appeared for a week 'twice-nightly' as a prelude to her film Sally in Our Alley. Jack Hulbert song and dance show 'The R.K.O. Loudspeakers' was staged as part of the film programme in August 1931. It was taken over by County Cinemas and renamed Olympic Theatre from 21 March 1932, re-opening with John Stuart in In a Monastery Garden. County Cinemas had commissioned architect Alister G. MacDonald to re-design the entrance and the interior was re-designed by Edward Carrick. A revolve was installed in the centre of the stage at this time. It closed in July 1932 and Jack Buchanan took control again. In August 1932, films were dropped in favour of non-stop variety, which began with Non-Stop Revels live on stage, non-stop from two 'til midnight daily. Marie Kendall, singing "Just Like the Ivy", was one of the artistes appearing. This policy lasted for almost a year.

The theatre was then taken over again by United Artists and on 27 September 1933 re-opened as a full-time cinema, once more re-named the Leicester Square Theatre, with Jack Buchanan's own film for United Artists That's a Good Girl. It played United Artists pictures first run in London until it was closed again on 18 July 1937 for redecoration. It re-opened on 16 September 1937 with Victoria the Great, starring Anna Neagle.

In 1938, General Film Distributors took control (J. Arthur Rank was one of the directors) and it became the first West End Cinema to be controlled by what would become the Rank Organisation in later years.

=== 1940–1967 ===
The cinema was closed for almost a year from late-October 1940 when it suffered bomb damage. It re-opened on 11 July 1941 with The Flame of New Orleans. Oscar Deutsch Odeon Theatres Ltd. took over in July 1946, and they closed it in July 1950 for some repairs to be carried out to the war damage.

The UK premiere of Walt Disney's Alice in Wonderland was held here on 26 July 1951. Further repairs were carried out in 1955. The UK premiere of Laurence Olivier's production of Richard III took place in August 1955, and it ran here for thirteen weeks. The Longest Day played as a 'roadshow' presentation from 11 October 1962 until 4 September 1963. The UK premiere of Mary Poppins opened here on 17 December 1964 and played for several weeks before transferring to the Odeon Haymarket. The European Gala Premiere of The Happiest Millionaire starring Tommy Steele was held here on 26 October 1967. The Leicester Square Theatre was closed on 3 April 1968 with Carry On Doctor. The cinema was to undergo a complete interior refurbishment. The Wurlitzer organ, which was played at special organ concerts right up to closing, was also removed from the building.

=== 1968–1988 ===
Architects Arnold Dick Associates designed a new ‘modern style’ single screen cinema within the shell of the building, with a stalls and circle seating areas (removing the upper balcony) and the interior design was by Cassidy, Farrington and Dennys. Seating was provided for 1,407: 900 in the stalls and 507 in the circle.

Most of the detailed French Renaissance style interior was stripped out, with only the ceiling in particular retained, albeit punctured by steelwork and hidden from view by a new lower ceiling, ultimately falling into a state of disrepair with sections of moulded plasterwork coming away.

The Leicester Square Theatre re-opened on 12 December 1968 with a Royal Charity Premiere attended by Princess Margaret, Countess of Snowdon and Lord Snowdon of Shalako, starring Sean Connery. It was equipped for 70mm presentations. Over the following 48 years it hosted many film premieres, including Papillon in March 1974, Tommy in March 1975, and Crocodile Dundee in 1986.

=== 1988–2015 ===
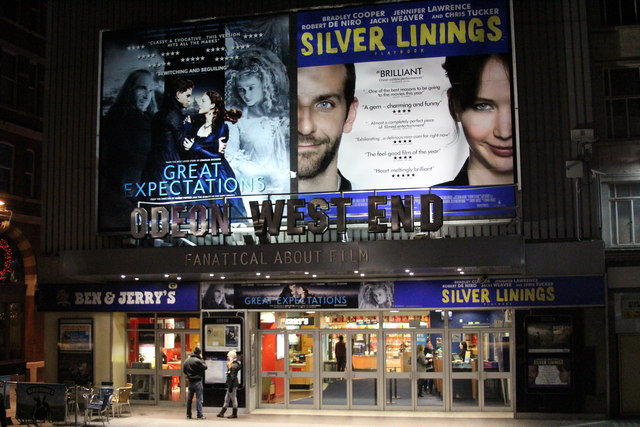
Odeon West End in 2012

It was renamed Odeon West End from 22 July 1988 with the opening of the comedy film The Couch Trip. It closed for twinning on 11 July 1991 with The Pope Must Die. The Odeon West End re-opened on 11 October 1991 with screen 1 upstairs seating 503 playing Toy Soldiers and screen 2 downstairs opening on 1 November 1991 with 848 seats playing Twenty-One. In 2008, the UK premiere of Sex and the City saw the film play in both auditoriums with every single session selling out. Sometimes, the film distributors would force the Odeon film bookings department to play less than popular movies as they were contracted to play a certain number of films at Odeon West End each year. Quite often, shows were run with less than 10 people attending each screening.

The Odeon West End had an exclusive run of The Master from 2 November 2012, playing a 70mm print of the film. The cinema, in its later years, was also the West End base for the annual London Film Festival.

The site was sold by Odeon Cinemas to three Irish investors in February 2006, though continued to operate as part of the Odeon chain. Ownership subsequently passed to the Irish National Asset Management Agency and in 2012 it was sold to the Radisson Hotels company.

A new set of plans for a hotel were approved by Westminster Council on 21 January 2014, and the Odeon West End closed on 1 January 2015. The final films were The Hunger Games: Mockingjay - Part 1, showing in screen 1 upstairs (489-seats) and Interstellar, showing in screen 2 downstairs (814-seats). Interstellar had been screened in a 70mm print until 24 December, and was replaced by a digital copy for its final seven days.

== Demolition ==
In January 2014, Westminster City Council approved a plan by Radisson Hotels to demolish the building and replace it with an eight-storey 360-room hotel, which would also include a two-screen Odeon cinema in the basement.

Odeon cinema staff had four days to remove their equipment from the building, which was handed over to the demolition contractors on 5 January 2015, and demolition began in April 2015 and was completed in September 2015.

== Reopening ==
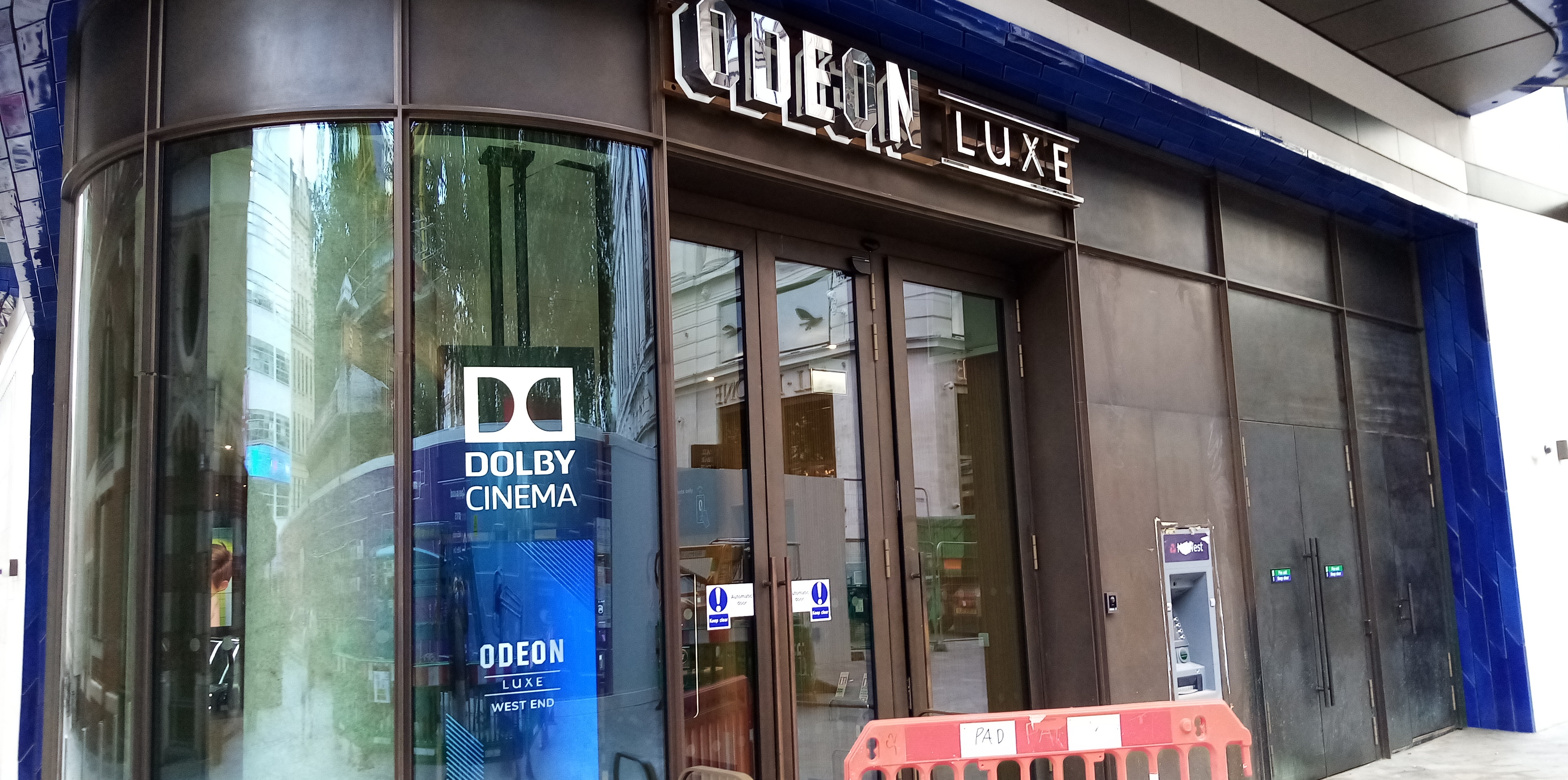

The cinema reopened in September 2021 as the Odeon Luxe West End, occupying the basement of The Londoner, a new boutique hotel with six underground floors as well as nine above-ground. The redevelopment was undertaken by Arup.

The cinema has two screens. The main auditorium features a Dolby Vision laser projector and Dolby Atmos audio.

The Odeon Luxe West End was one of seven London venues that hosted the BFI London Film Festival 2021. The theater also hosted the premiere of the 2024 Dolby Cinema remaster of Tom Hooper's 2012 film adaptation of the musical Les Miserables.

== See also ==
- Odeon Marble Arch – former large cinema in London's West End
