= The Ridings Centre =

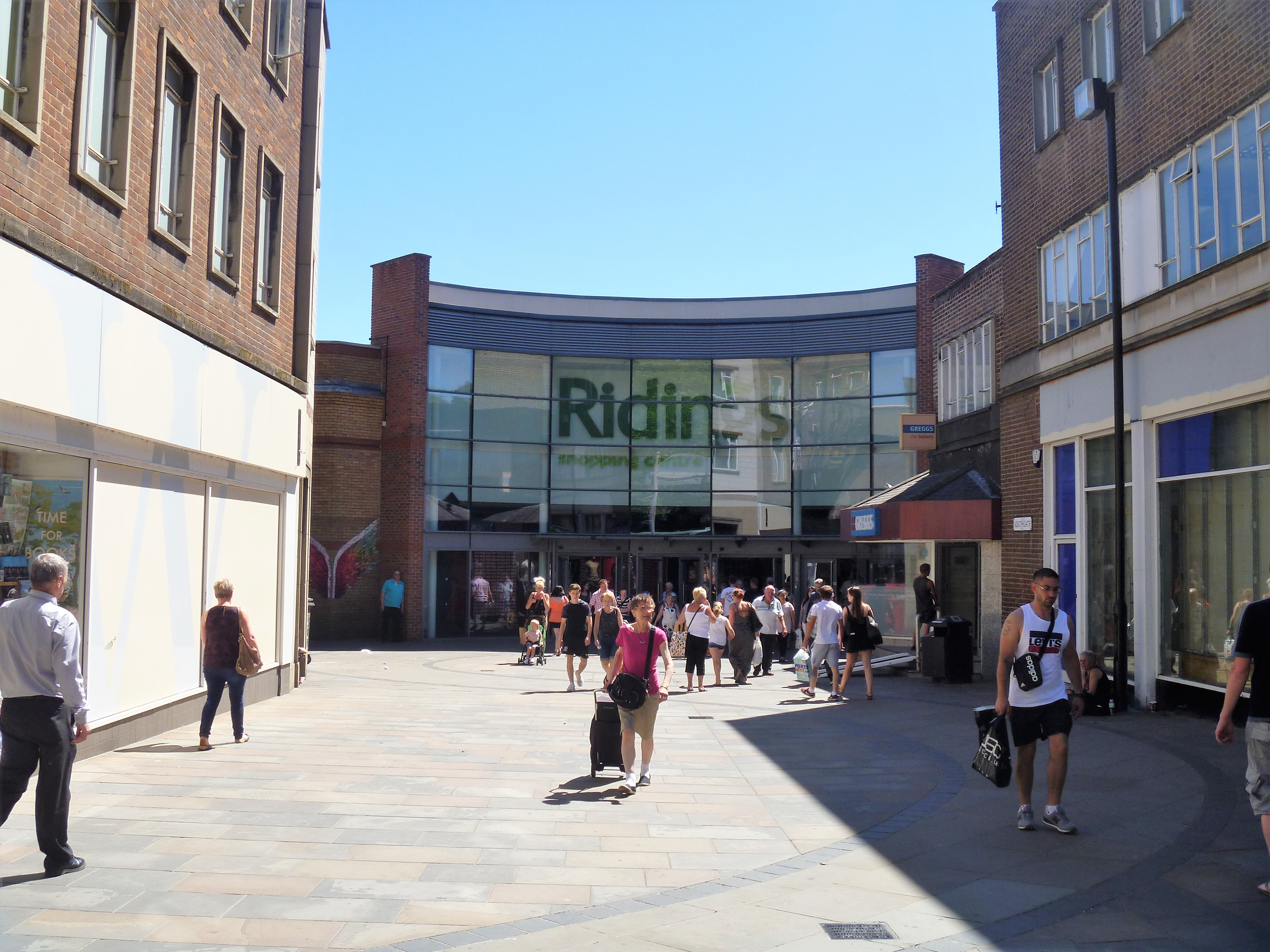
- Main entrance on the city's pedestrianised precinct, opposite Wakefield Cathedral
- Location: Wakefield, England WF1 1DS
- Coordinates: 53.682149°N 1.496791°W
- Opened: 17 October 1983
- Owner: City of Wakefield Metropolitan District Council
- Num. of stores: 80
- Num. of anchor tenants: 5
- Floors: 3
- Parking: 1,070 spaces
- Website: www.ridingscentre.com

The Ridings Shopping Centre is an indoor shopping centre in Wakefield, West Yorkshire, England. It opened on 17 October 1983. The pioneering centre was a UK first and subsequently served as a template for many shopping centres throughout the UK.

In November 2026, it was announced that the Ridings would be transformed into a "vibrant leisure destination" while retaining existing businesses.

== Stores and services ==
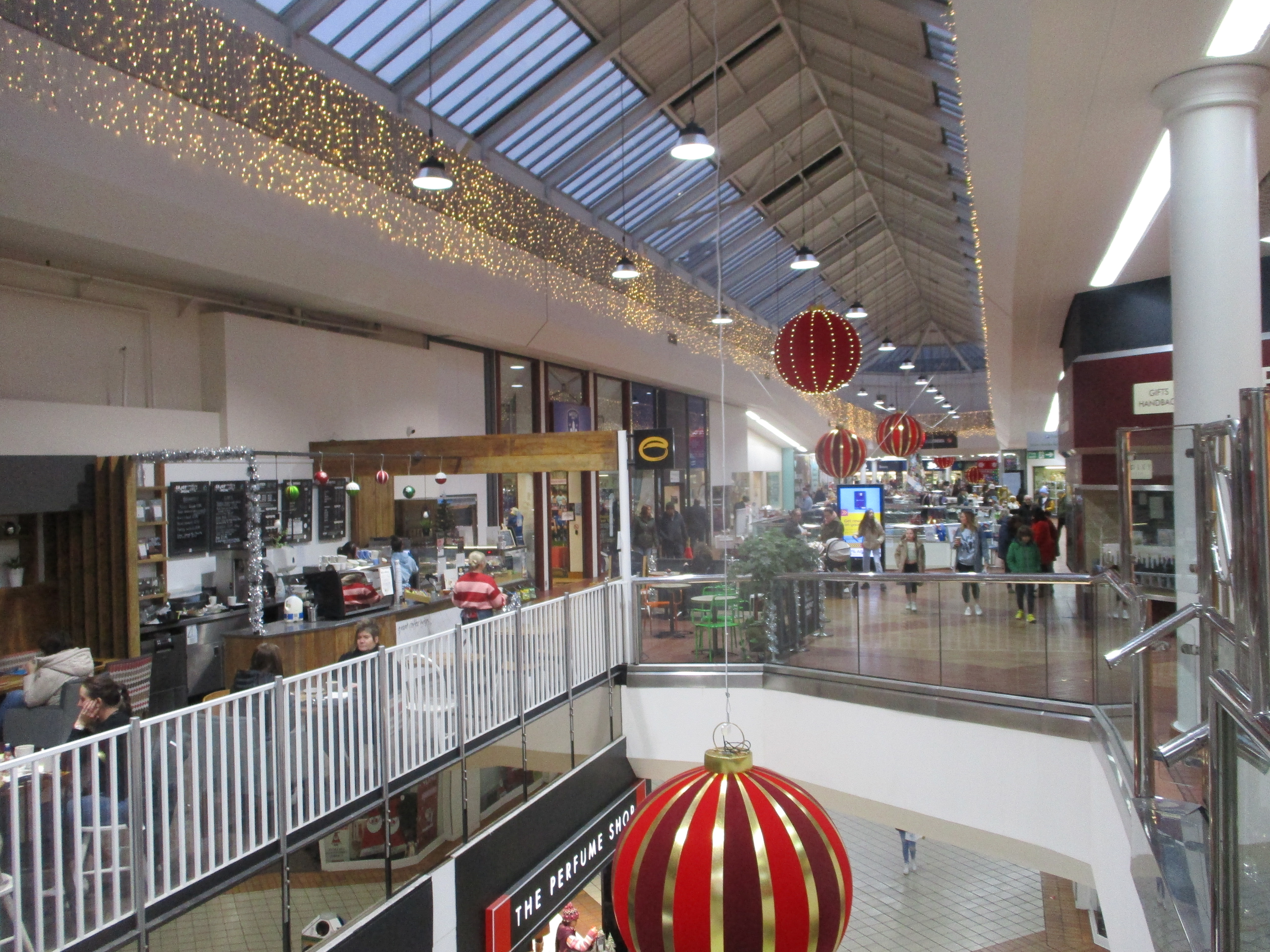
Interior of the Ridings Centre

The Ridings Centre covers an area of 319,000 square feet (29,600 m^{2}). The centre contains a large number of independent businesses, alongside Reel Cinema, Boots, Marks & Spencer, Morrisons, Poundland, Card Factory, Perfume Shop, F. Hinds, and Esquires Coffee. The main atrium is used for various events and fairs. The centre has three car parks and has toilets on the lower mall.

== History ==
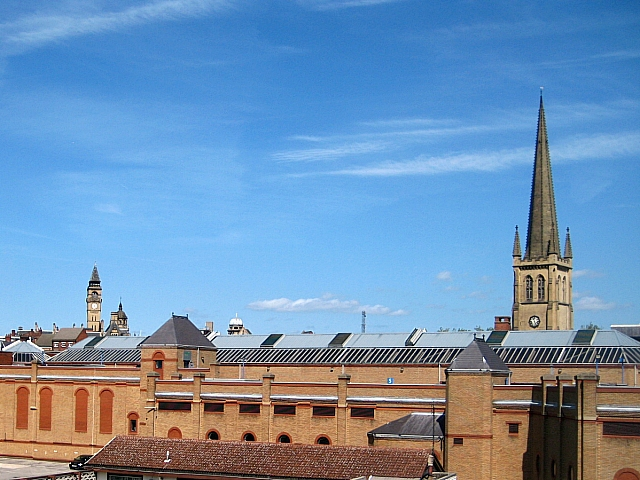
Rear of the centre with Wakefield Cathedral in the background

The Ridings Centre opened on 17 October 1983. It included construction of a large complex to house the upper and middle malls along with the blue and red car parks. In addition to this, an existing open shopping precinct on Kirkgate originally opened in 1972 was roofed and extensively updated to become the lower mall, and the existing Almshouse Lane multi-storey was adapted to become the green car park. It was the first of its kind in the UK, containing features such as a food court inspired by shopping centres in the United States and its major popularity upon opening meant there were queues even to enter the centre.

The centre was extensively refurbished in 2008 at a cost of £2.5 million. The improvements included a redesign of the centre's entrances as well as new lifts (replacing the original glass wall-climber lift that was the first in the UK).

The Ridings Centre was purchased in 2015 by NewRiver. This was followed by a £5 million renovation in 2017 which included a new food court (since closed) and space for 'pop-up' shops. A five-screen Reel Cinema opened in the centre in 2019.

The centre was then later sold to Zahid Iqbal in 2023, who planned to refurbish the centre by demolishing the Kirkgate entrance in 2024 but work was paused after it was announced that Wakefield Council wanted to buy the centre after being granted £10.9 million to demolish the full centre and redevelop it into a new project called Cathedral Quarter.

Wakefield Council purchased the Ridings in May 2026. In November 2026, following a public consultation the decision was made to cancel the proposed demolition as well as the wider Cathedral Quarter plans. Instead, the Ridings is set to be transformed into a "vibrant leisure destination" while retaining existing businesses. This will include more "hospitality, entertainment, and cultural uses".

== Awards ==
- The Ridings Centre won the award for 'European Shopping Centre Of The Year' on numerous occasions.
- In 2018 the centre won the Revo Purple Apple Marketing Awards, obtaining a Golden Apple Award.

== Transport connections ==
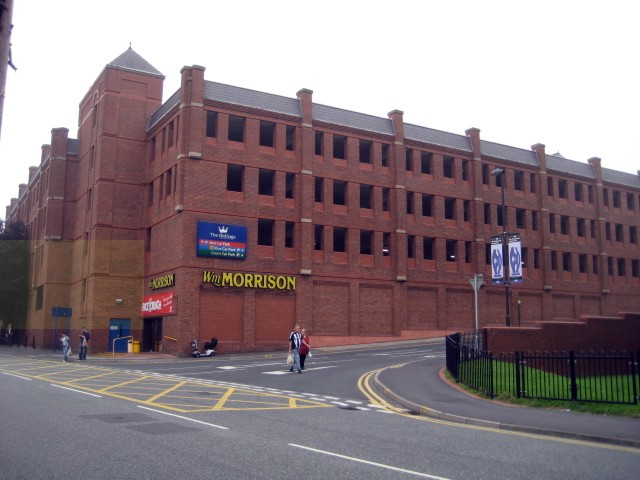
Ridings Centre Blue Car Park

The Ridings Centre is located near Wakefield Westgate and Wakefield Kirkgate railway stations as well as Wakefield Bus Station. The centre is located near the A61 and the M1.

The main entrance is on the city's pedestrianised precinct adjacent to Waterstones, opposite Wakefield Cathedral.
