= Cecil Clavering =

English architect (1910–2001)

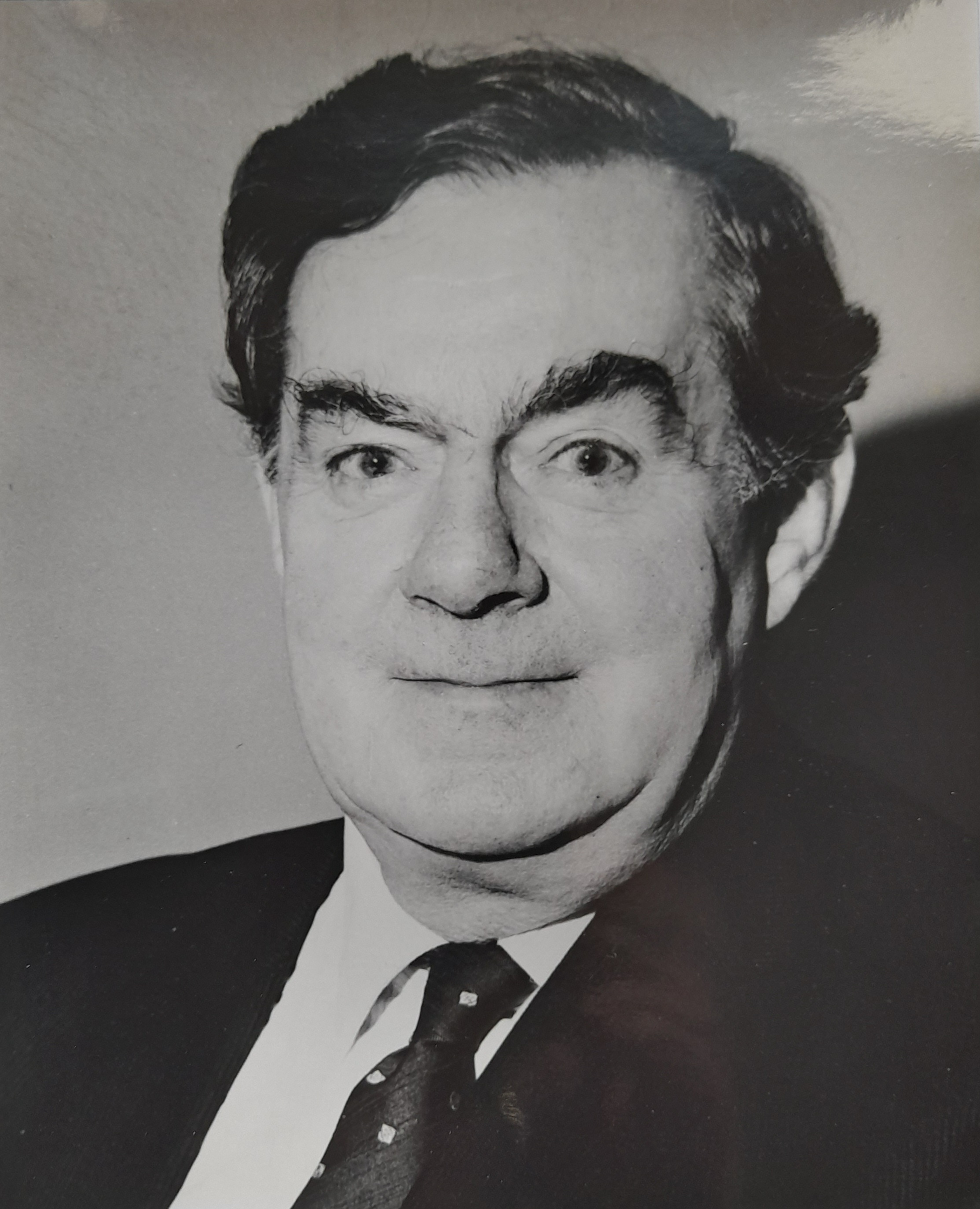
John Cecil Clavering OBE

John Cecil Clavering OBE (17 April 1910 – 6 October 2001) was an English architect, best known for his work designing Odeon Cinemas as part of Harry Weedon's architectural practice in the 1930s, and his later work as the architect of the Public Record Office Q1 building at the National Archives, Kew, London.

== Life ==
Clavering was born and educated in Sunderland, County Durham, the son of a schoolmaster. At the age of seventeen he was articled to J. H. Morton & Sons, a firm of architects in South Shields. Whilst a pupil he studied architecture part-time at Armstrong College, Newcastle-on-Tyne (now Durham University School of Architecture) where he was introduced to the work of Le Corbusier, Willem Marinus Dudok, Erich Mendelsohn and Berthold Lubetkin. With a travelling scholarship he visited the major architecture centres of Italy in 1929 and 1930. He was the winner of the Northern Architecture Association Drawing Prize and Glover Medal in 1930. Clavering's tour of Austria and Germany followed in 1931 along with his passing an RIBA exam and being finalist in the Tite Prize, Victory Scholarship and Rome finalist that year.

Clavering's work at the time included the draughtsmanship or design of several cinemas in South Shields and Newcastle upon Tyne. Clavering was unhappy with the classical detailing that was required for the cinemas, however - feeling that such ostentatious decoration was inappropriate in poor areas and also presented practical problems when reproduced in terracotta or faience - and concluded that "the answer appeared to be the new architecture advocated by Le Corbusier and the Germans".

Clavering's opportunity came when, as assistant to Harry Weedon in Birmingham, he was commissioned to redesign the interior of a cinema being built in Warley for Oscar Deutsch, owner of the expanding Odeon Cinemas chain. Weedon's practice at the time numbered only six architects, none of whom except Weedon himself had any experience of cinema design, so Clavering was recruited to complete the job. He next worked on the Odeon, Kingstanding, then examples in Sutton Coldfield, Colwyn Bay and Scarborough, "one masterpiece after the other" considered "the finest expressions of the Odeon circuit style". Later in 1935 however Clavering stunned Weedon by resigning to take up a job with HM Office of Works. Weedon approached Clavering's former tutor who recommended Robert Bullivant as Clavering's replacement.

In 1935 Clavering entered the only design competition ever held for direct entry into the professional class of HM Office of Works examination in architecture and was offered a post as architectural assistant in Shanghai, China. He was to provide all buildings and accommodation needs of the Diplomatic and Consular Service of the Far East from Siam (Thailand) to Japan.

In 1934 Clavering had married Maysie Hanlon whom he had met whilst studying at Durham University. She was the daughter of a grocer who owned several shops on Tyneside. They travelled to Shanghai together and their daughter, Ann, was born there in August 1935. They lived in a house provided for them in the grounds of the British Consulate. It appears that neither of Clavering's designs for a new Embassy at Nanjing or Consulate General at Shanghai were ever built due to the prevailing political situation.

In 1941 the family returned to England by sea via Canada and America. They lived near London during this wartime period with Clavering remaining at the Ministry of Works. He then specialised in buildings and facilities for research throughout England. These included the Blue Streak Project at Spadeadam in Cumbria; wind tunnels for RAE Farnborough's Royal Aircraft Establishment at Bedford opened in 1957, and the radio communication centre at Goonhilly Downs in Cornwall.

He was later involved in the design of the buildings housing the Nuclear Reactors at Windscale in Cumbria, now called Sellafield, and Britain’s first working Nuclear Power Station. Another project, the rebuilding of Whitehall in London, was later aborted. His final project, the Public Record Office at Kew, he regarded as his best work.

Clavering made a RIBA Liecentiate member application 17 December 1951 whilst working for the Ministry of Works and living at Callaly, Hayes Lane, Kenley, Surrey. He was proposed by Sir Charles Mole, M.O.W., Lambeth Bridge House, 28 December 1951.

Clavering was awarded an OBE in the 1971 New Years honours list as superintending architect at the Department of the Environment for services to architecture. He and Maysie then retired to Harrogate for their final years.

== Legacy ==
In 2013 Historic England listed Clavering's 1948 design for HM Government, the P-test stands and support structures at the former Royal Ordinance Establishment, RAF Westcott, Buckinghamshire; listing 140397

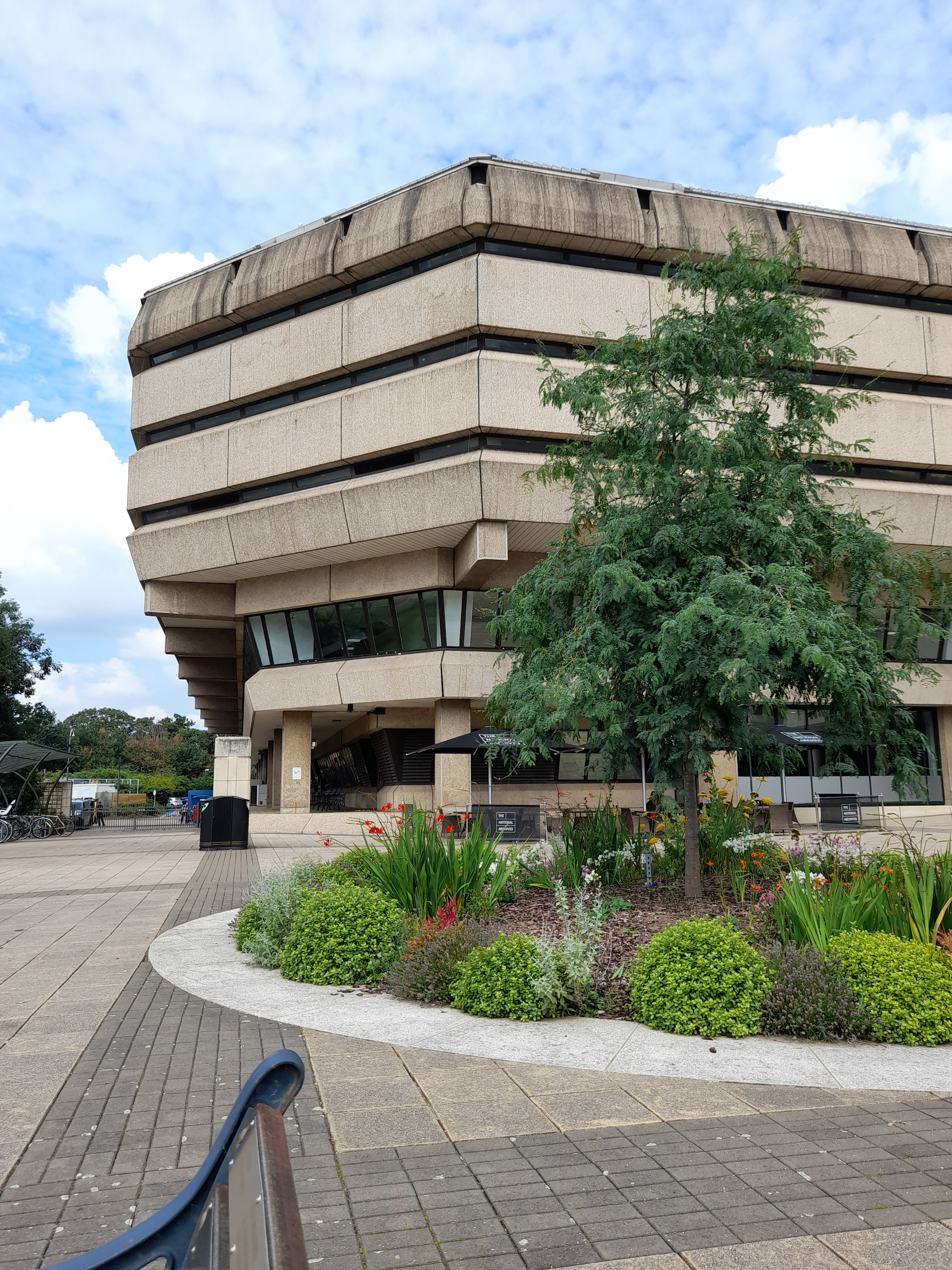
Detail of the Public Record Office Q1 building, the National Archives, Kew opened in 1977.
