= Reel Cinemas Ltd =

British cinema chain

Reel Cinemas
- Industry: Movie Theaters
- Founded: 2001; 25 years ago in Loughborough
- Founder: Kailash 'KC' Suri
- Headquarters: United Kingdom
- Website: www.reelcinemas.co.uk

Reel Cinemas Ltd is a chain of multiplex cinemas based in the United Kingdom.

== History ==
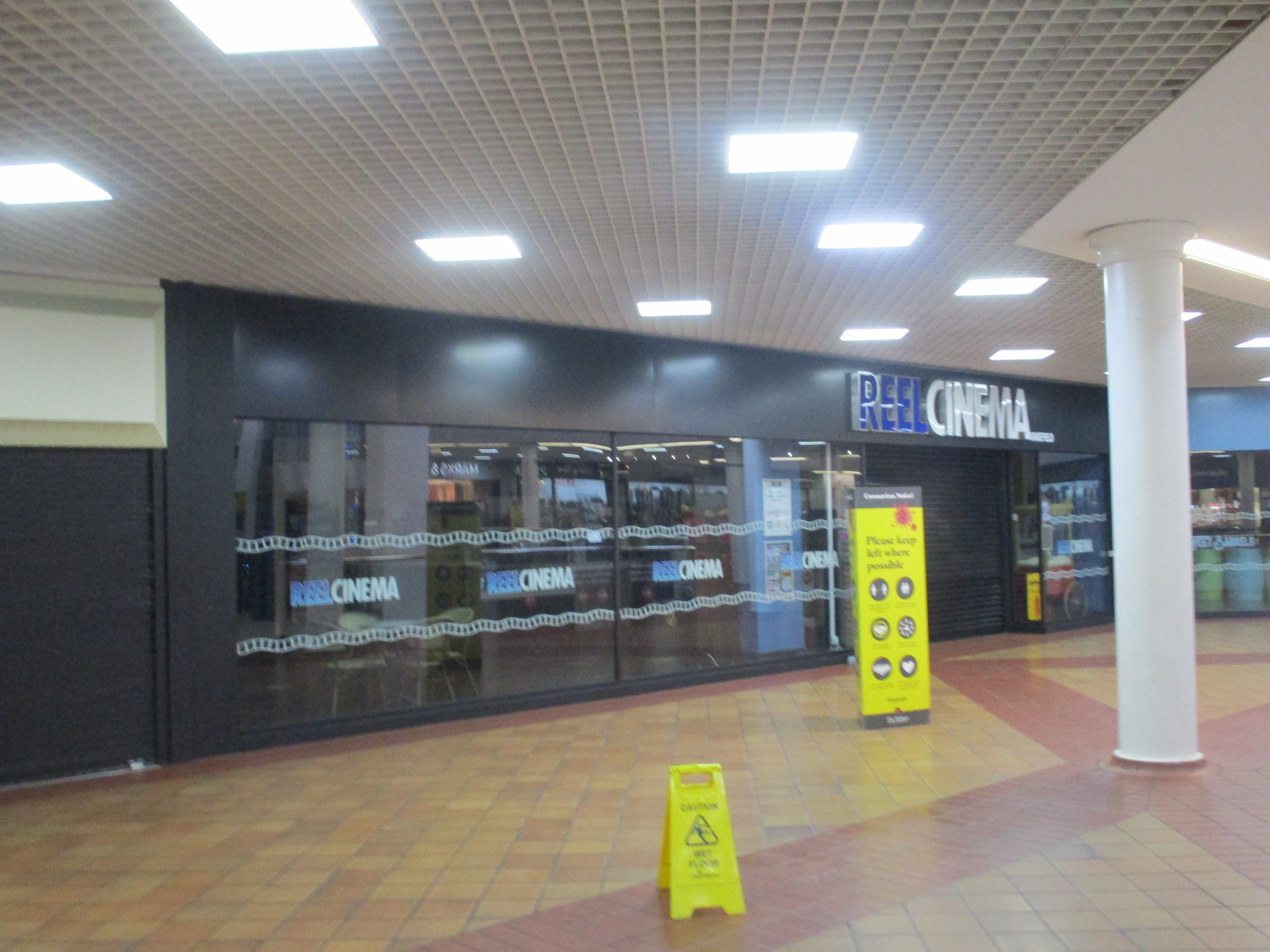
Reel Cinema in the Ridings Centre, Wakefield.

The first cinema in the chain was the Curzon Cinema in Loughborough, which was established in 2001 by Kailash 'KC' Suri. Cinemas in other cities and towns were then added to the newly formed Curzon Leisure Group over the next few years. In 2005, the chain was renamed Reel Cinemas Ltd.

REEL Cinemas is a family-owned, independent UK cinema operator with 16 sites and 88 screens nationwide.

In March 2020, all UK cinemas closed indefinitely due to a national lockdown in response to the ongoing COVID-19 pandemic.

== Locations ==
Reel Cinemas currently have 16 cinema complexes throughout the United Kingdom.

| Town/City | Number of screens | Cinema Name | Notes |
|---|---|---|---|
| Bishop Auckland | 7 | Reel Cinema | Opened March 2026 |
| Blackburn | 8 | Reel Cinema | Opened May 2021 |
| Borehamwood | 4 | Reel Cinema | |
| Bridgnorth | 3 | Reel Cinema | Previously known as The Majestice |
| Burnley | 7 | Reel Cinema | Brand new cinema opened in September 2023 - previously on the outskirts of the town, now in the town centre |
| Chippenham | 5 | Reel Cinema | Previously known as The Astoria |
| Chorley | 6 | Reel Cinema | Extension to Chorley Market Walk that opened December 2019. |
| Fareham | 5 | Reel Cinema | Acquired from Apollo Cinemas in 2012 |
| Farnham | 6 | Reel Cinema | Opened in March 2024 - 6 screens and one luxury REEL Lounge, with sofas |
| Hull | 7 | Reel Cinema | One of their largest locations which is located in St Stephens Shopping Centre in Central Hull. |
| Morecambe | 4 | Reel Cinema | Acquired from Apollo Cinemas in 2012 |
| Port Talbot | 6 | Reel Cinema | Acquired from Apollo Cinemas in 2012 |
| Quinton | 4 | Reel Cinema | Previously known as The Danilo and Odeon Cinema |
| Rochdale | 6 | Reel Cinema | |
| Wakefield | 5 | Reel Cinema | Located in The Ridings Centre |
| Widnes | 5 | Reel Cinema | |

=== Planned locations ===
Planned cinemas whose construction has been delayed and which have no confirmed opening date:

- Ashington
- Kirkby
- Barnsley

=== Former locations ===
Former Reel Cinemas include:

- Wellington
- York - Odeon Cinema
- Kidderminster
- Grantham
- Plymouth

In addition, the following Reel Cinemas were sold to Odeon Cinemas in 2011:

- Andover
- Crewe
- Loughborough
- Newark

The following were planned new sites, but were also acquired by Odeon Cinemas:

- Llanelli
- Swadlincote
- West Bromwich

== Gallery ==
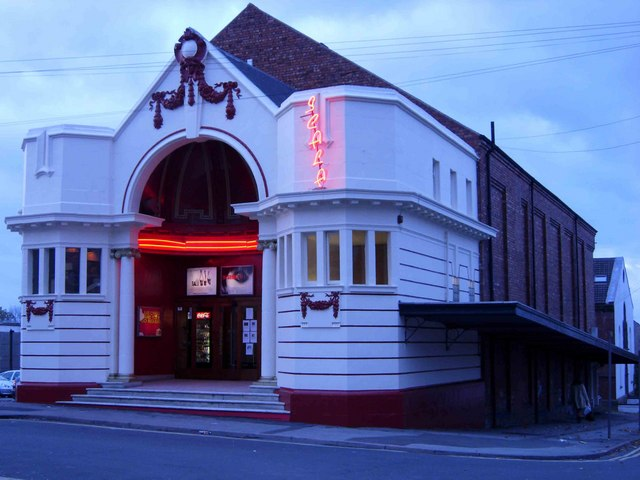
The Scala, Ilkeston

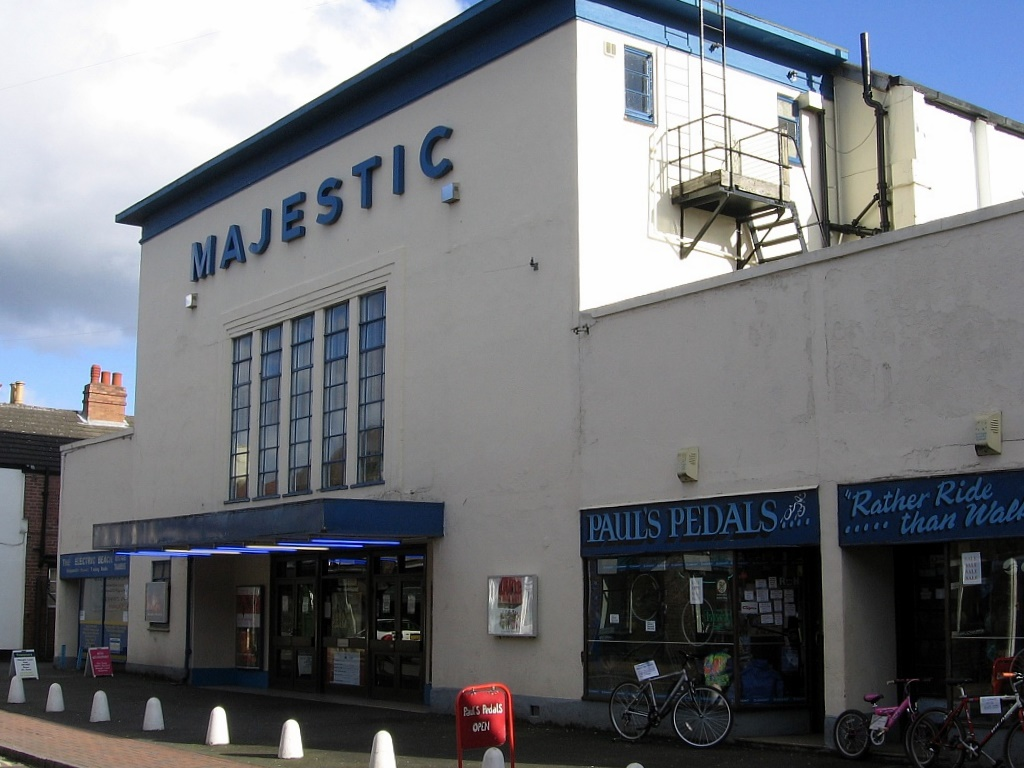
The Majestic, Bridgnorth

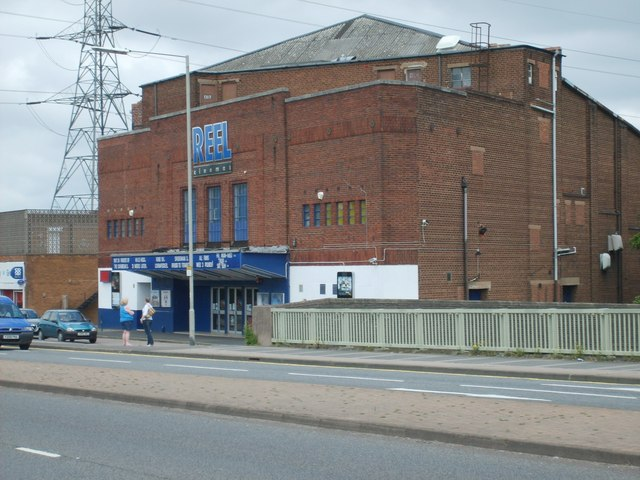
The Danilo, Quinton

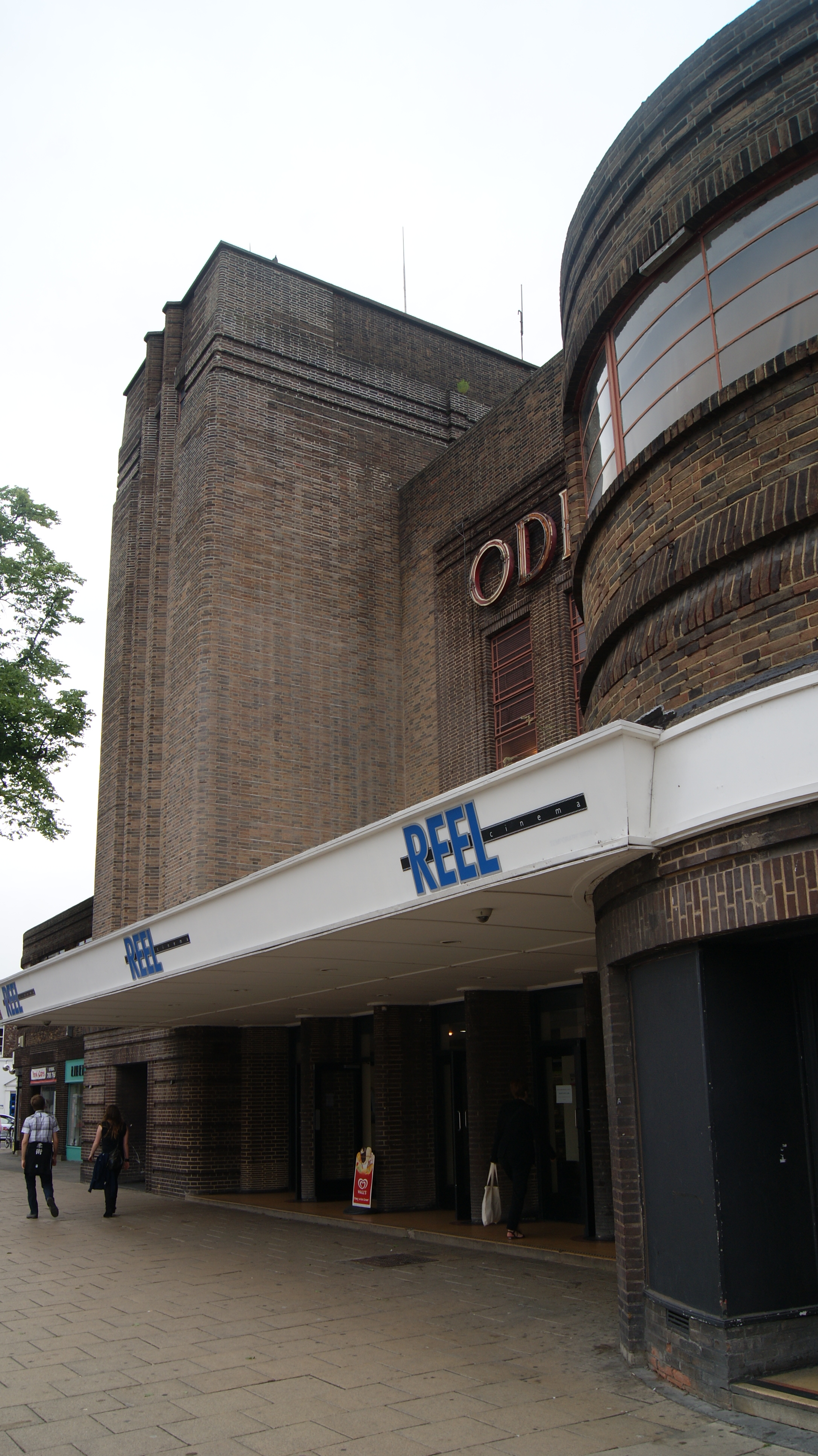
The Odeon, York
