= Charles Mole =

British architect

Sir Charles Johns Mole KBE, MVO (1886–1962) was a British architect who served in the Ministry of Works, eventually becoming its Director-General.

== Career ==
Mole was born in 1886 in Broadhempston, Devon. He was initially educated at Lipson Academy in Plymouth.

In 1911, he began working for the Office of Works, which later became the Ministry of Works. Amongst other things, he was involved in the coronation of King George VI and Queen Elizabeth. For his work in the Office, he was made a Member of the Victorian Order (MVO) in 1937.

In 1944, Mole became the Director of Works. Two years later, he was promoted to Director-General, a position he held until his retirement in 1958. During his tenure, he oversaw building and maintenance work of about £50m per year.

== Knighthood ==
Mole was knighted in 1947 and made KBE in 1953.

== Death ==
Sir Charles Johns Mole died at his home in Walton-on-Thames on 4 December 1962, aged 76.

== Personal life ==
Mole married Annie Eliza Martin in 1913. They had one son (Arthur) and two daughters (Joan and Enid).
