= Oscar Deutsch =

British Businessperson

- Born: August 12, 1893; Balsall Heath, Birmingham, United Kingdom
- Died: December 5, 1941 (aged 48); The London Clinic, London, United Kingdom
- Education: King Edward VI Five Ways Grammar School
- Occupations: Businessperson; cinema owner
- Known for: Founder of Odeon Cinemas
- Spouse: Lily Deutsch
- Children: 3
- Relatives: Arnold Deutsch (cousin)

Oscar Deutsch (12 August 1893 – 5 December 1941) was a British businessman, cinema owner and founder of Odeon Cinemas.

== Early life and education ==
Oscar Deutsch was born in Balsall Heath, Birmingham on 12 August 1893, to Leopold Deutsch (c.1866–1904) and Leah Deutsch, née Cohen (1868–1925). His father, born to a Hungarian Jewish family in Beckov, Austria-Hungary (present-day Slovakia), was a scrap metal merchant. His mother was born in Birmingham to a Polish Jewish family from Płock, Russian Empire (present-day Poland).

Deutsch was educated at King Edward VI Five Ways Grammar School, and upon leaving school worked at his father's metal firm in Birmingham. In 1918, he married Lily Deutsch and went on to have three sons.

== Career ==
In 1925, he rented cinemas in Wolverhampton and Coventry and started exhibiting subsequent runs of films. He opened his first cinema in nearby Brierley Hill, Dudley in 1928. By 1933 he had 26 Odeons and "Odeon" had started to become a household word, used interchangeably with "cinema" in some parts of the UK until after the Second World War.

By 1937 there were 250 Odeons, including the flagship cinema in Leicester Square, London, making Odeon one of the three major circuits in the UK. Odeon cinemas were considered more comfortable and respectable for middle-class filmgoers than those of the two other circuits, Associated British Cinemas (ABC) and Gaumont-British Cinemas.. Odeons were known for their art deco architecture, first used on the Odeon, Kingstanding to a design by Cecil Clavering, working for Harry Weedon. Clavering only designed three further Odeons, at Sutton Coldfield, Colwyn Bay and Scarborough, "one masterpiece after the other" considered "the finest expressions of the Odeon circuit style". Later in 1935, however, Clavering stunned Weedon by resigning to take up a job with the Office of Works. Weedon approached Clavering's former tutor who recommended Robert Bullivant as Clavering's replacement and Weedon was commissioned by Deutsch to oversee the design of the entire chain.

Deutsch became a director of the UK arm of United Artists, who had acquired a 50% stake in Odeon Cinema Holdings.

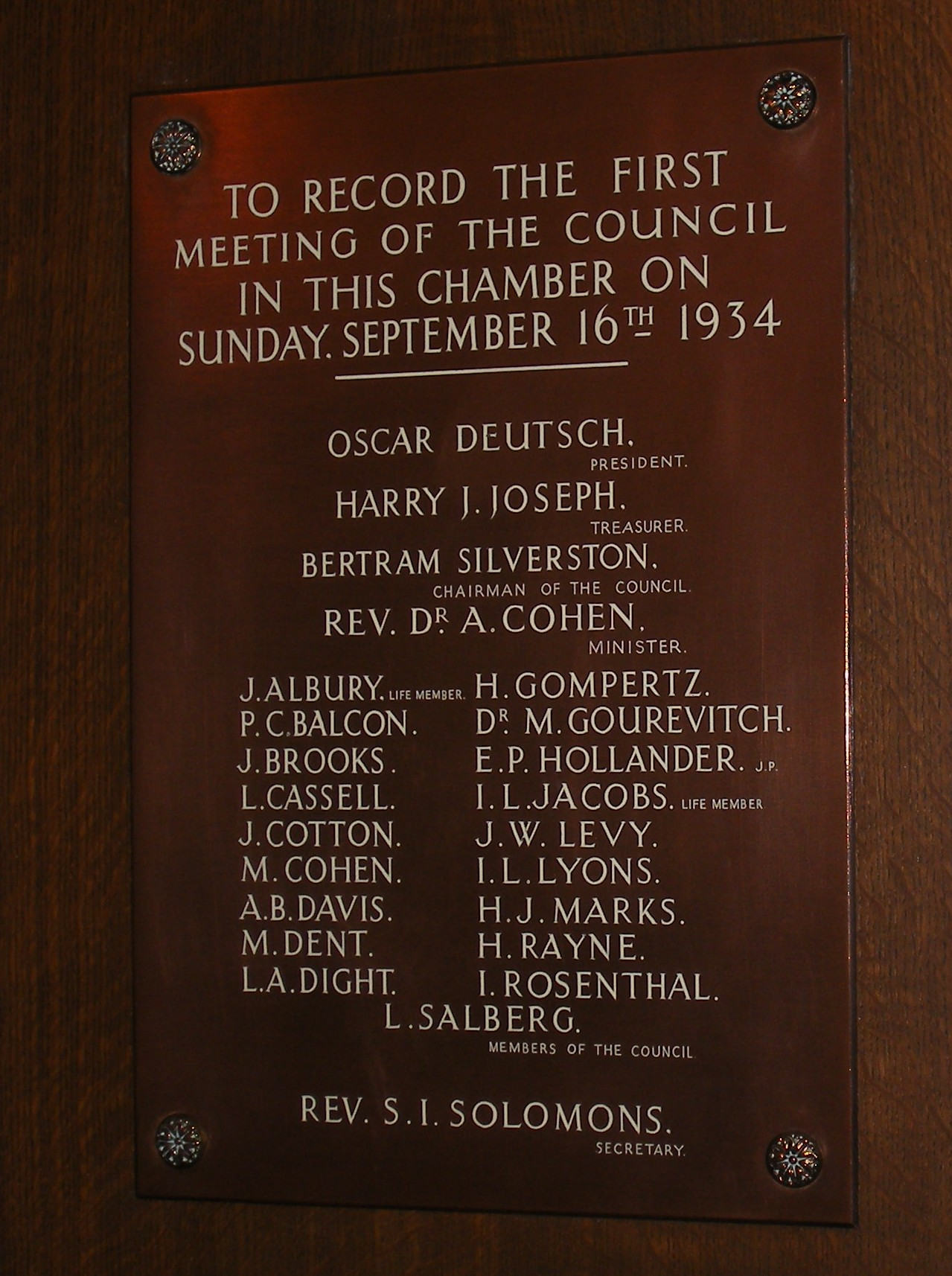
Plaque in Singers Hill Synagogue listing Deutsch as President.

He was from 1932 to 1940 President of Birmingham's main Synagogue, Singers Hill. In 1939, the Synagogue was extended by Harry Weedon.

In 1941, a bomb landed on his home and he was blown out of bed and never recovered. Deutsch died of cancer at The London Clinic on the 5 December 1941. Following Deutsch's death Lily Deutsch sold the Odeon chain to J. Arthur Rank and the Rank Organisation.

== Origin of "Odeon" ==
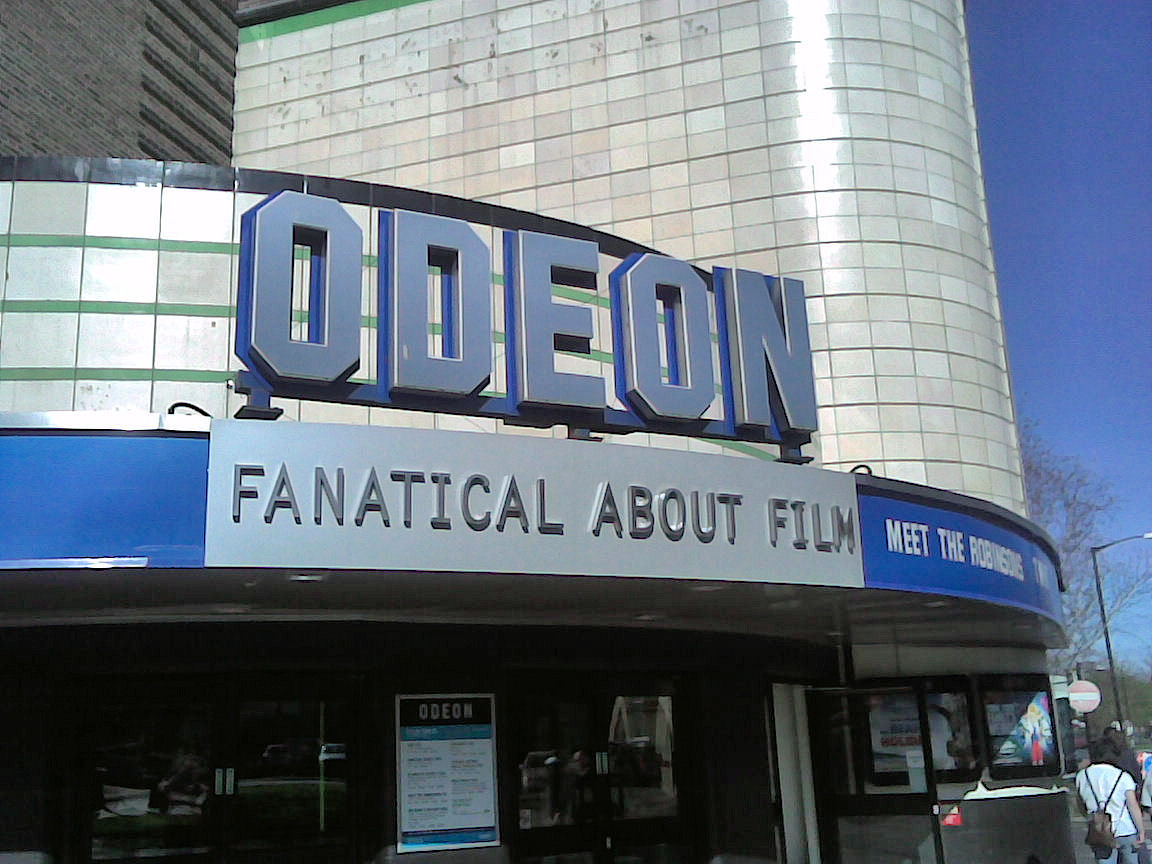
Odeon Cinema, Harrogate, showing the logo used from mid 1990s

The original Odeons were the popular amphitheatres of ancient Greece. The name Odeon had been appropriated by cinemas in France and Italy in the 1920s, but Deutsch made it his own in the UK. His publicity team claimed Odeon stood for "Oscar Deutsch Entertains Our Nation".

== See also ==
- George Coles (architect)
