= Odeon Cinema, York =

Listed cinema in York, England

Odeon Cinema
- The cinema in 2026
- Interactive map of the Odeon Cinema area

General information
- Type: Cinema
- Location: 1–5 Blossom Street, York, England
- Coordinates: 53°57′18″N 1°05′35″W
- Year built: 1937; 89 years ago
- Renovated: 1972 (converted) c. 2017 (renovated)
- Cost: £40,500
- Owner: Everyman Cinemas

Design and construction
- Architect: Harry Weedon
- Designations

Listed Building – Grade II
- Official name: Odeon Cinema and Odeon Buildings
- Designated: 23 April 1981
- Reference no.: 1259501

Website
- Official website

The Odeon Cinema is a Grade II listed building immediately west of the city centre of York, England.

The Odeon Cinemas chain was keen to build a cinema in York, but it could not gain permission to construct a large building within the city walls. Initial plans were toned down, and the resulting building is almost entirely of buff brick, with none of the tiles which often feature in Harry Weedon's work. Following these changes, permission was granted to build on Blossom Street, just outside the walls.

The building opened as an Odeon Cinema on 1 February 1937. It was designed by Weedon, with assistance of Robert Bullivant, and with interiors attributed to Lily Deutsch. Construction cost £40,500. On opening, it had 1,484 seats: 934 in the stalls and 550 on the balcony. In 1972, it was converted to three screens, with the balcony extended forward to form one 800-seat auditorium and the rear of the former stalls divided into two smaller screens, each with 111 seats. It was designated a Grade II listed building in 1981.

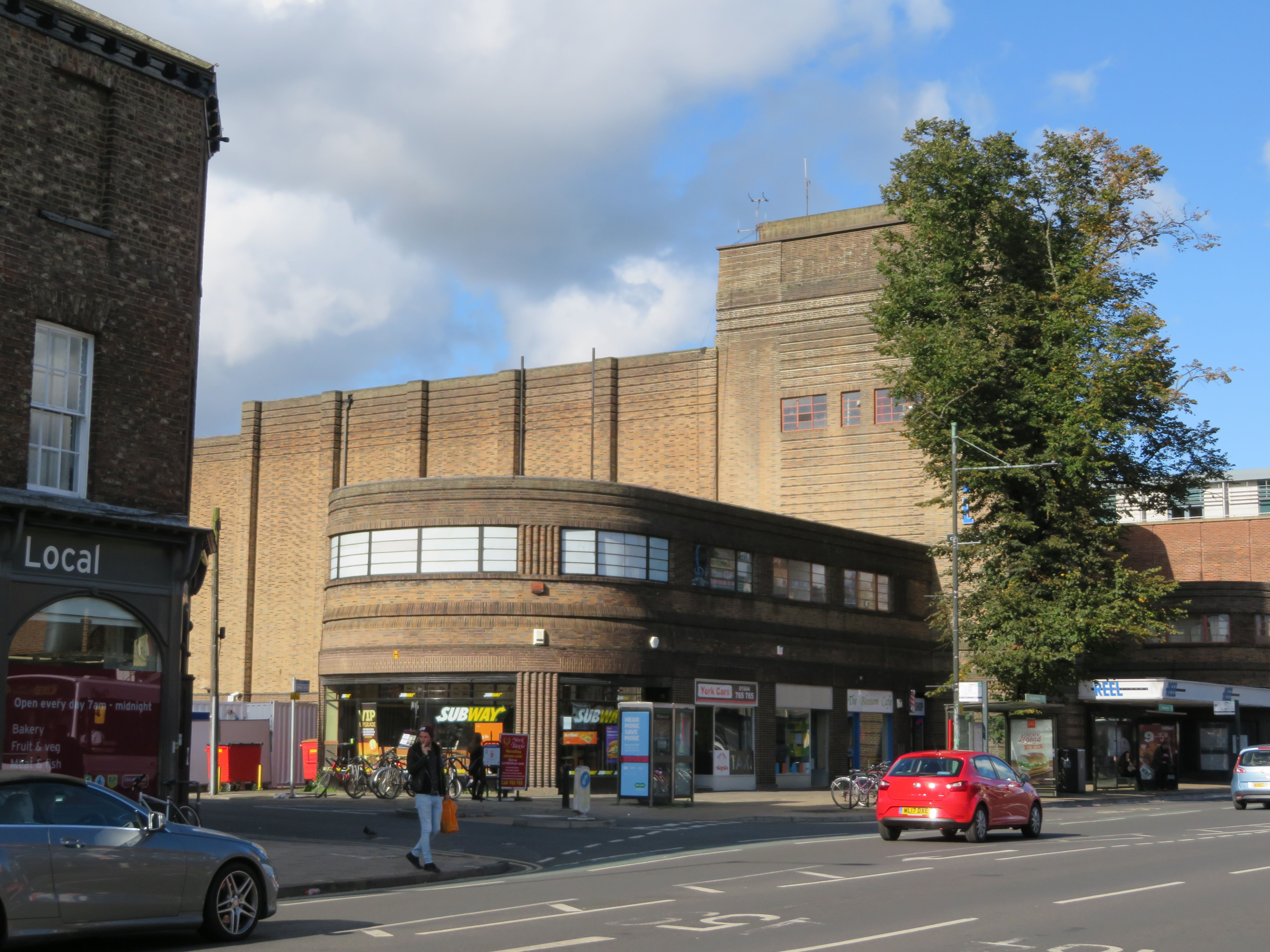
The building seen from the west in 2017, while operating as Reel

The building is in the Art Deco style and has a low front range, with a three-storey range behind, a tower to the left, and two-storey wings on either side. Part of the front range is occupied by shops. The tower retains an illuminated "Odeon" sign, rendered in Roman capital letters rather than the chain's usual style.

Odeon planned to close the cinema in 2003, with a 13,000-name petition leading to a short reprieve. It closed in 2006 but reopened in 2009 as part of the Reel Cinemas chain. In 2017, it was purchased by Everyman Cinemas and renovated to accommodate four screens, each with sofa seating.

The official listing notes that "the architecture ... is well designed and executed, and is a good example of Odeon cinema design", and that original windows survive along with some original design elements and ancillary rooms. John Brooke Fieldhouse describes it as having "... the overall texture of a building belonging to an ancient civilisation".

== See also ==
- Listed buildings in York (outside the city walls, southern part)
