= Odeon, Kingstanding =

Odeon Kingstanding
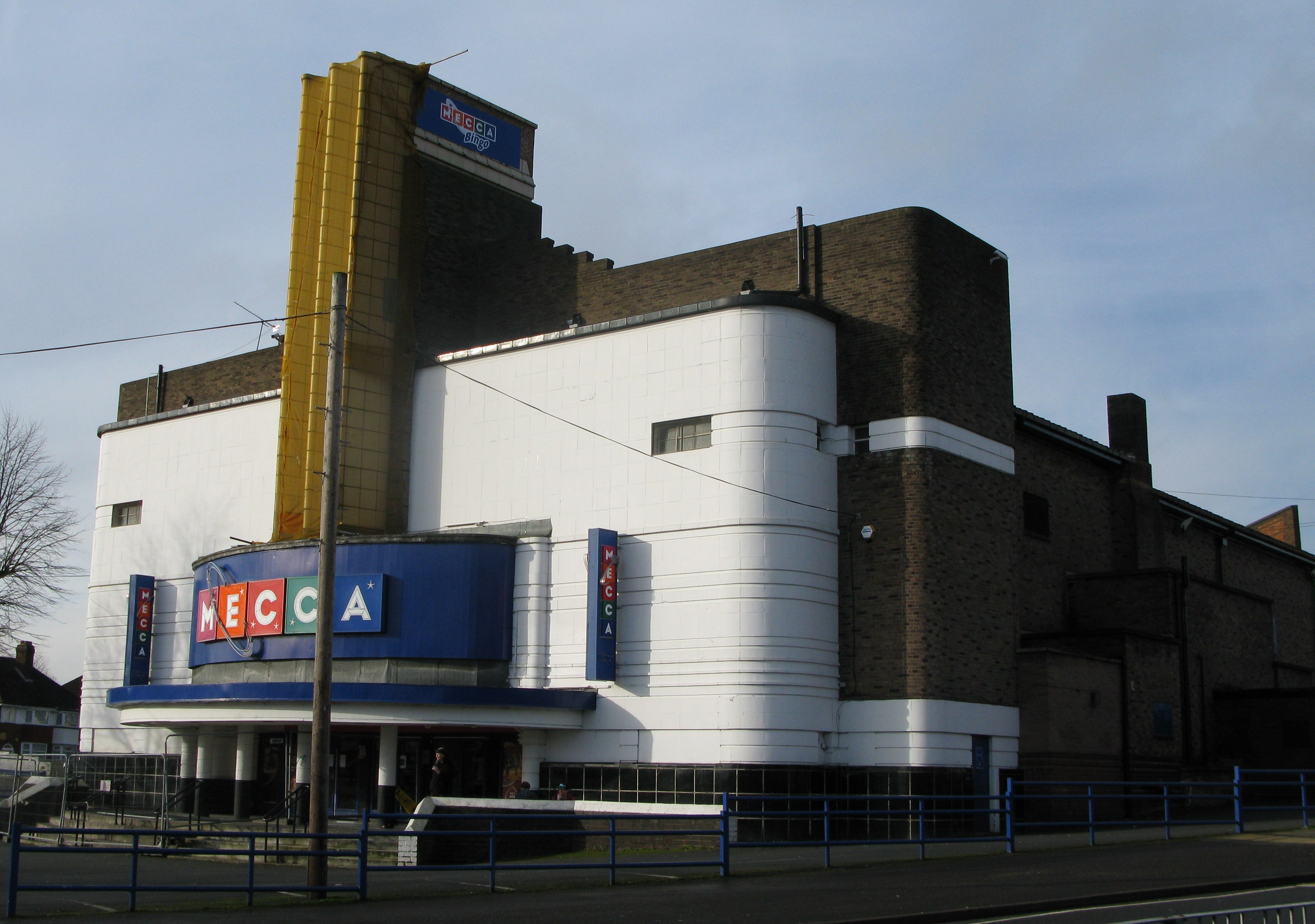
- The building in 2014, showing the "Mecca" branding

General information
- Architectural style: Art deco; modernist
- Location: Kingstanding, Birmingham, England

Listed Building – Grade II
- Official name: Top Rank Club
- Designated: 10 October 1980
- Reference no.: 1076275
- Coordinates: 52.5536°N 1.8856°W
- Opened: 22 July 1935

Design and construction
- Architects: Harry Weedon; Cecil Clavering

The Odeon at Kingstanding, Birmingham, was a 1930s cinema in the Odeon chain. Though closed as a cinema in 1962, the building continued to be used as a bingo hall, falling vacant in 2026. It is Grade II listed.

== History ==
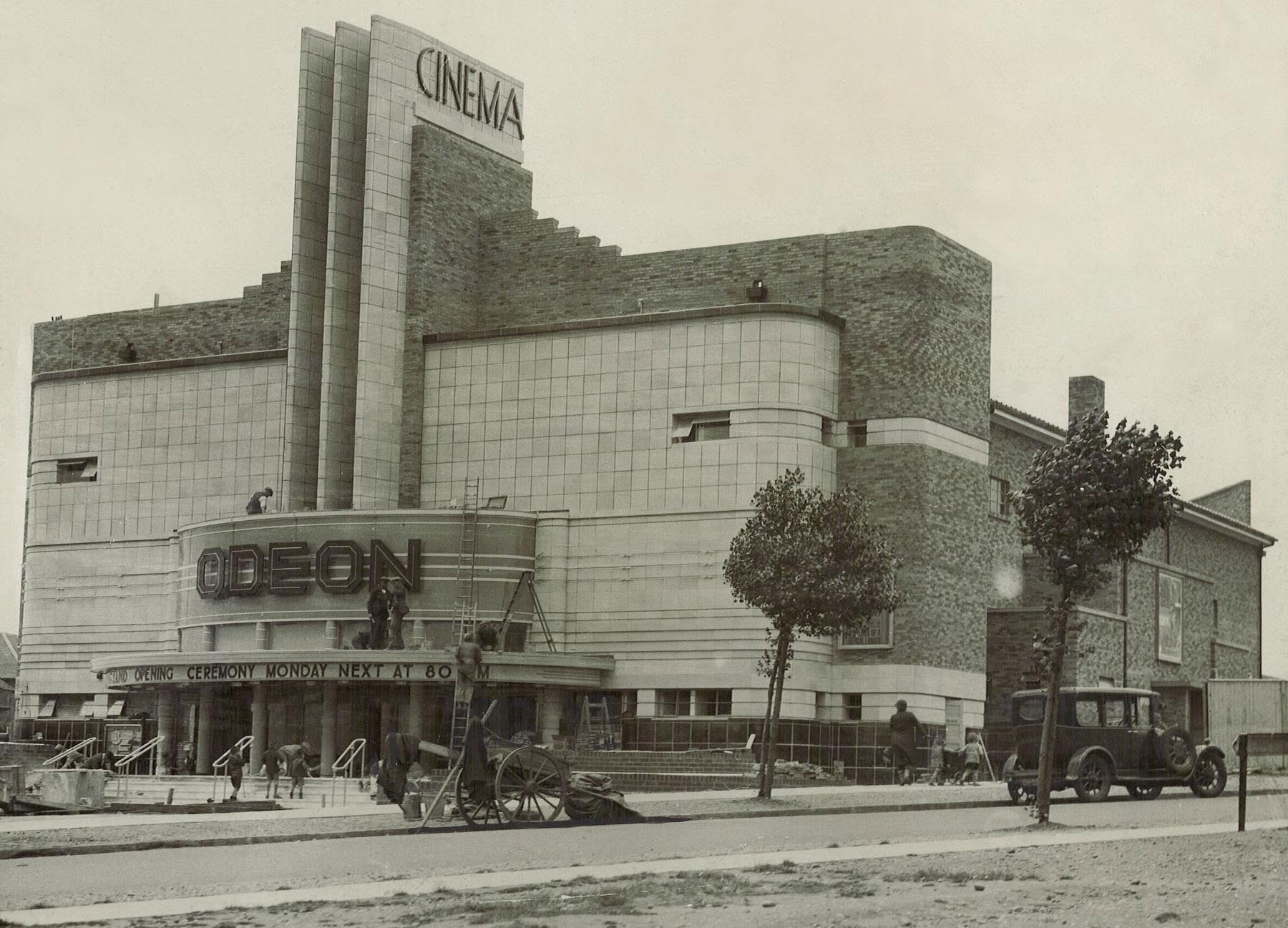
Kingstanding Odeon, days before its July 1935 opening. Note the original tiled frontage.

The cinema was constructed between 1935 and 1936 to a symmetrical, modernist, art deco design by Harry Weedon and Cecil Clavering, the latter having joined the former's practice, as an assistant, in 1933. It was commissioned as an independent cinema, and was due to be called "The Beacon", after nearby Barr Beacon, but Oscar Deutsch became involved, and the cinema opened as part of his Odeon chain on 22 July 1935. It was built to serve Kingstanding's new, 4,000-home working-class housing estate and had 968 seats in the stalls and 324 in the circle. The first film was The Lives of a Bengal Lancer, starring Gary Cooper.

The brick building occupies a wedge-shaped site between Kings Road and Kettlehouse Road, overlooking and facing Kingstanding Circle. The centre of the glazed cream and black tile ("faience") frontage features three slender fins, also finished with faience, above a stepped brick parapet. Clavering, inspired by the Lichtburg cinema in Berlin, originally intended that these fins would be topped by a searchlight.

The cinema closed on 1 December 1962, the final film being To Hell and Back, starring Audie Murphy.

== Bingo ==
The building was refurbished and opened as a Top Rank Bingo Club, subsequently becoming a Mecca Bingo Club. In May 2026, Mecca announced the closure of the bingo hall, at a date to be confirmed, saying "The club has not been profitable for some time and requires considerable repairs and maintenance". It closed on 7 June that year.

== Listing ==
It was given Grade II listed status by English Heritage just 44 years after its erection, on 10 October 1980, giving it legal protection from unauthorised alteration or demolition. It has been described as "one of the best surviving examples of Odeon cinemas in Britain".
