= Harry Weedon =

English architect

- Born: 9 Aug 1887; Birmingham, England
- Died: 17 June 1970 (aged 82–83)
- Occupation: Architect
- Practice: Weedon Partnership
- Buildings: Odeon Cinemas

Harold William "Harry" Weedon (1887 – 17 June 1970) was an English architect. Although he designed a large number of buildings during a long career, he is best known for his role overseeing the Art Deco designs of the Odeon Cinemas for Oscar Deutsch in the 1930s. Influenced by the work of Erich Mendelsohn and Hans Poelzig – the Odeons "taught Britain to love modern architecture" and form "a body of work which, with London Underground stations, denotes the Thirties like nothing else".

== Life ==
=== Education and early career ===
Weedon was born in Handsworth, Birmingham, the son of a commercial traveller, and educated at King Edward's School in the city. He studied architecture at the Birmingham School of Art from 1904, before being articled to the architectural practice of Robert Atkinson. In 1912 at the age of 24 he was made an associate of the Royal Institute of British Architects and went into partnership with Harold Seymore Scott, with whom he designed a cinema in Birchfield, completed in 1913, and several upmarket houses in Warwickshire.

The outbreak of World War I saw building work dry up, however, and in 1914 he volunteered as a pilot in the Royal Flying Corps, serving until 1917. On his demobilisation he set about re-establishing his architectural practice, but an affair with the wife of a neighbour resulted in a scandalous double divorce that destroyed his reputation, and he spent the following years in Leamington Spa working as a manager in the catering industry.

=== The Odeon era ===
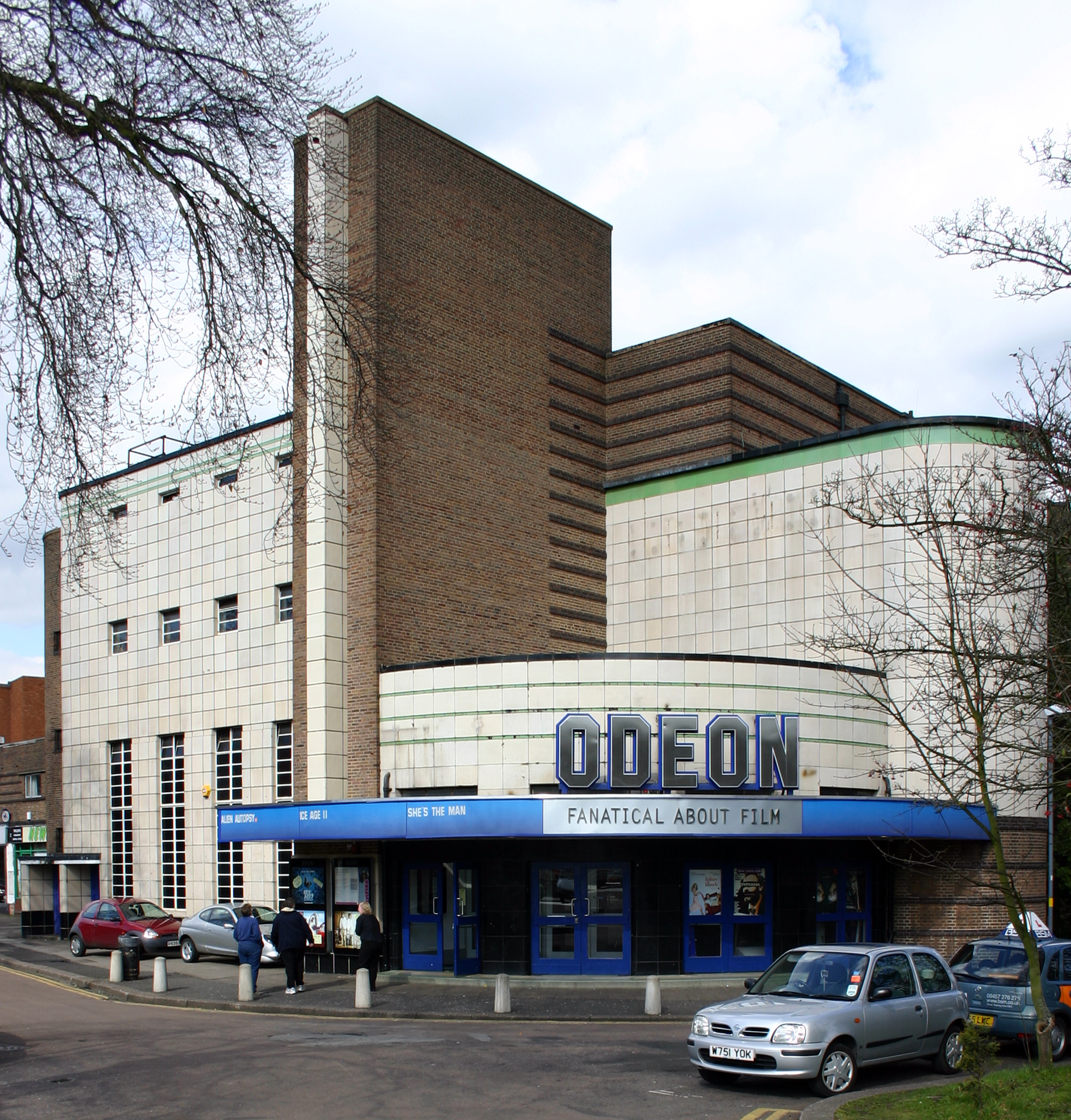
The former Odeon Cinema, Sutton Coldfield by Weedon and Cecil Clavering, 1936.

Weedon returned to Birmingham and to architecture in 1925, quickly building up his practice designing housing estates and commercial and industrial premises. It was his work in 1932 designing the enlargement of a factory in Hockley, Birmingham for the firm of Deutsch and Brenner that brought him to the attention of Oscar Deutsch – the factory's owner's son – who was in the process of building up his Odeon chain of cinemas and was dissatisfied with the interior proposed for his cinema under construction in Warley near Birmingham. Weedon was approached by Deutsch to complete the design, but at the time his office numbered only six staff and had nobody other than Weedon himself with any cinema experience, so the young Cecil Clavering was recruited to complete the work.

It was Clavering's next cinema design, for the Odeon, Kingstanding, built in Birmingham's expanding Kingstanding suburb in 1935, that cemented the relationship between Deutsch and Weedon. Originally designed for another chain and to be called the "Beacon", Deutsch saw in Clavering's simple and original Art Deco design the making of the house style he sought to distinguish the Odeon chain from his rivals. The cinema was quickly bought for the Odeon group and Weedon was appointed to oversee all of the group's designs.

Between Weedon's appointment in 1934 and the outbreak of World War II in 1939 the Weedon office was to design or act as consultant architect to over 250 of Deutsch's cinemas. Not all of these were designed by the practice itself: of the thirty-six Odeons that opened in 1936 only eight were Weedon designs. Even those that were designed by the Weedon practice were not designed by Weedon himself – Weedon's role has been likened to that of an executive producer, creating the house style and maintaining consistent quality. The practice's other major notable building of the era – the Villa Marina, an early British example of a house in the International Style built in Llandudno in 1936 – was designed by Weedon personally.

Clavering himself designed three more Odeons for Weedon after Kingstanding – in Sutton Coldfield, Colwyn Bay and Scarborough, "one masterpiece after the other" considered "the finest expressions of the Odeon circuit style". Later in 1935 however Clavering stunned Weedon by resigning to take up a job with the Office of Works. Weedon approached Clavering's former tutor who recommended Robert Bullivant as Clavering's replacement.

=== Post-war ===
In March 1939, Weedon brought four of his senior staff into partnership to form the Weedon Partnership. The outbreak of World War II later that year, and the take-over of the Odeon group by J. Arthur Rank on the death of Deutsch in 1942, saw cinema design work evaporate, and Weedon spent most of the war overseeing the dispersal of Birmingham's wartime industries to protect them during the Birmingham Blitz. This resulted in a wide range of contacts with the Midlands' engineering and industrial firms and the post-war era saw the Weedon Partnership focusing on the design of factories, including notable work at the British Motor Corporation's Longbridge plant and in Cowley, Oxford, and a large factory for Typhoo Tea in Digbeth, Birmingham.

Weedon himself continued design work until his final illness.

The Partnership is still in business as WeedonArchitects and celebrated its centenary in 2012 with a move to new offices in Harry's Yard in the Jewellery Quarter close to Birmingham City Centre. It has maintained Harry's links with the Automotive industry with buildings for Aston Martin, Jaguar Land Rover and Toyota amongst others. The partnership has been involved in a variety of projects including ones at Brindleyplace (Birmingham), Piccadilly Place (Manchester), The Mailbox (Birmingham) and Hicking Pentecost (Nottingham).

Weedon had a love of shooting and was involved in the Solihull Home Guard Rifle Club after the war. The club was formed in 1944 and Harry Weedon donated a three-quarter acre disused sand pit to the club in 1952. This became the location for the club and it still operates today as the Solihull Rifle and Pistol Club.
