= Astoria =

Astoria may refer to:

== Arts, entertainment and media ==
=== Fictional entities ===
- Astoria, ex-wife of Muppet character Waldorf
- Astoria Greengrass, a Harry Potter character
- Astoria Rapunzel, in Italian animated series Regal Academy
- Astoria, in comic book Cerebus the Aardvark
- Astoria, a song by 40 Watt Sun

=== Music ===
- Astoria (Marianas Trench album) 2015
- Astoria, a 2006 album by The Shys
- Astoria: Portrait of the Artist, a 1990 album by Tony Bennett

=== Other uses in arts, entertainment and media ===
- Astoria (book), by Washington Irving, an 1836 account of the founding of Astoria, Oregon
- Astoria (film), a 2000 American drama film
- Astoria, a play by Jura Soyfer (1912–1939)

== Buildings ==
- Astoria–Megler Bridge, a bridge that connects Megler, Washington, to Astoria, Oregon
- Astoria (Amsterdam), a Jugendstil Office building in the Netherlands
- Astoria, Stockholm, a cinema in Sweden
- Astoria Theatre, Brighton, in England
- Hotel Astoria, the name of several hotels
- London Astoria, a former music venue in England
- Kaufman Astoria Studios, in New York City, United States

== Places ==
=== United States ===
- Astoria, Illinois
  - Astoria Township, Fulton County, Illinois
- Astoria, Missouri
- Astoria, Queens, New York
  - Astoria Boulevard
  - Astoria Boulevard station
  - Astoria Park
- Astoria, Oregon
  - Fort Astoria, fur trading post of the Pacific Fur Company
  - Astoria Regional Airport
- Astoria, South Dakota
- Astoria Canyon, a submarine abyss near the mouth of the Columbia River

=== Other places ===
- Astoria, Budapest, Hungary
  - Astoria metro station
- Astoria River, in Jasper National Park, Alberta, Canada

== Ships ==
- Astoria, later Saga Pearl II, a cruise ship 2002–2010
- MV Astoria, a passenger liner
- USS Astoria, the name of several U.S. Navy vessels

== Sports ==
- Astoria Bydgoszcz, or simply Astoria, a Polish multi-sports club
- FC Astoria Walldorf, a German football club

== Other uses ==
- Astoria, a converted houseboat holding a recording studio
- Astoria (turkey), a wild turkey named after the New York City neighborhood
- Astoria Bank, a former New York bank
- Astoria Cinemas, a former Swedish cinema chain
- Cafe Astoria, a Western-style bakery in Taiwan
- WCF Data Services, formerly ADO.NET Data Services, codename "Astoria"

== See also ==
- Astoria High School (disambiguation)
- Astoria Line (disambiguation)
- Astoria station (disambiguation)
- Waldorf-Astoria (disambiguation)
- Astoria Grande, a cruise ship from 2021
- Astor family
  - John Jacob Astor (1763–1848), after whom many things called Astoria are named
