= Hotel Astoria =

Hotel Astoria may refer to:

- Hotel Astoria, Brussels, later Corinthia Grand Hotel Astoria, Belgium
- Hotel Astoria (Copenhagen), Denmark
- Danubius Hotel Astoria, Budapest, Hungary
- Hotel Astoria (Saint Petersburg), Russia
- Hotel Astoria (Belgrade), later Queen's Astoria Design Hotel, Serbia
- Hotel Astoria (Oregon), later John Jacob Astor Hotel, in Astoria, Oregon, United States
- Hotel Astoria at the Waldorf-Astoria (1893–1929), in Manhattan, New York, United States
- Astoria Hotels and Resorts, Philippine hotel chain
- Astoria Hotel (Vancouver)
- Astoria Palace Hotel, Rio de Janeiro, Brazil
- Waldorf-Astoria (disambiguation)

== See also ==
- Astoria Palace Hotel, Rio de Janeiro, Brazil
- Waldorf-Astoria (disambiguation)
