= Atoria =

Atoria can refer to:

- Atoria (Centuria), fictional girl with magical healing powers in the Japanese web manga Centuria
- Kishan Singh Atoria, a principal secretary of revenue

== See also ==
- Astoria (disambiguation)
