= Svenska Bio =

Swedish cinema chain

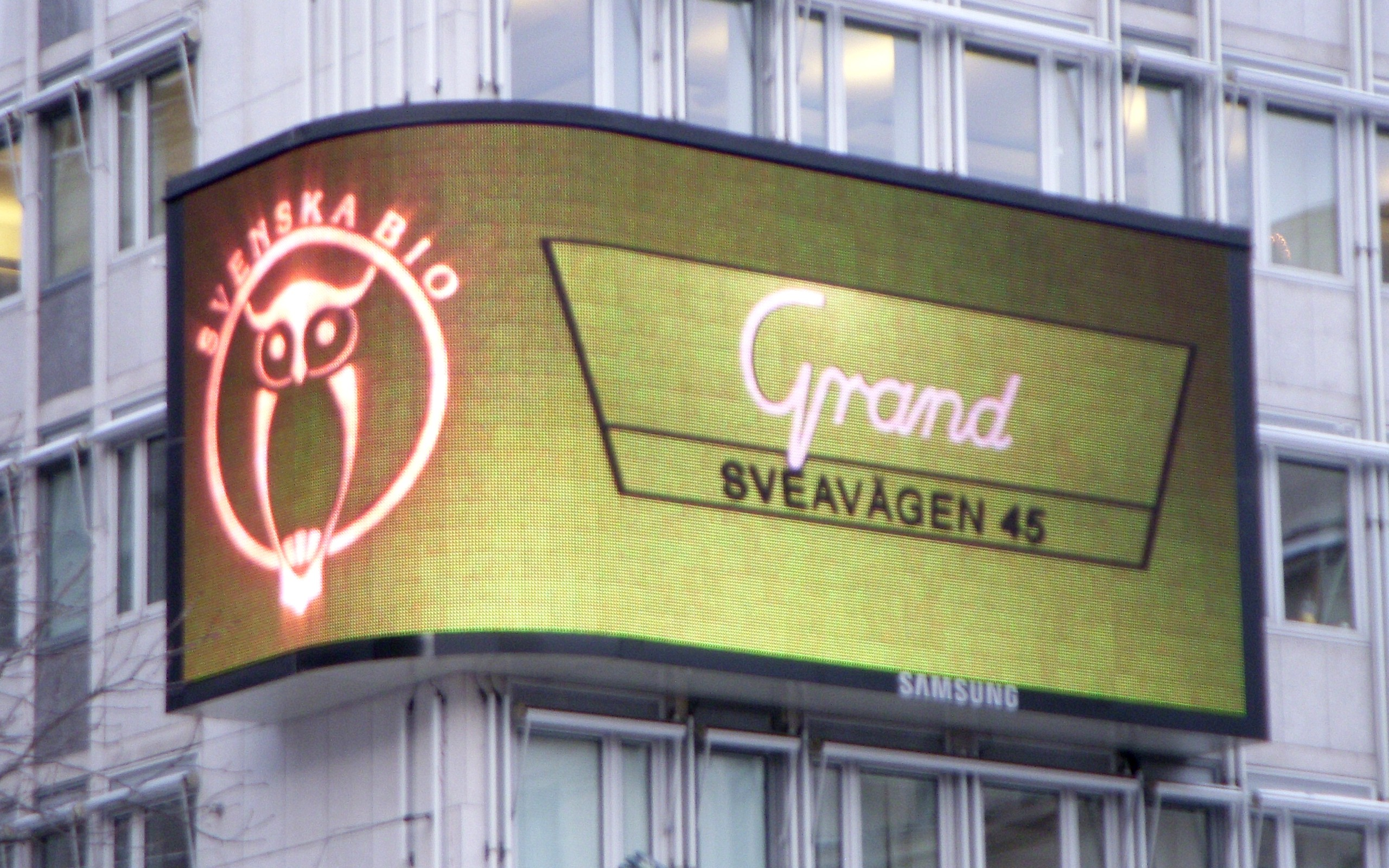
- Type: Joint-stock company
- Industry: Cinema
- Predecessor: Fornstams Biografer; Svensk Filmindustri (some cinemas); Astoria Cinemas (2 cinemas)
- Founded: 1987; 39 years ago
- Area served: Sweden and Denmark
- Owner: Succéfilm AB (50%); SF Bio (50%)
- Website: https://www.svenskabio.se

Svenska Bio is a cinema company headquartered in Lidingö, Sweden. In the late 1980s, the company was formed from a merger between Fornstams Biografer and several cinemas owned by Svensk Filmindustri. In August 2007 the company bought two cinemas in Stockholm, called Victoria and Grand, from Astoria Cinemas. By doing so, they then owned 16% of the Swedish cinema market. They are the second biggest cinema chain in Sweden.

By November 2017, the company had with 37 cinemas, 142 screens, 12,724 chairs and by May 2018, the company had spread to 55 cities.

== Ownership ==
Peter Fornstam, the CEO of Svenska Bio, owns 50 percent of the company, and Filmstaden, a subsidiary of Nordic Cinema Group which is itself a subsidiary of Odeon Cinemas Group, owns the other 50 percent.
