= Waldorf =

Waldorf can have the following meanings:

== People ==
- Stephen Waldorf (born 1957), film editor
- William Waldorf Astor, 1st Viscount Astor (1848–1919), financier and statesman
- Waldorf Astor, 2nd Viscount Astor (1879–1952), businessman and politician
- Pappy Waldorf (1902–1981), 1966 College Football Hall of Fame inductee as a coach

== Communities ==
Germany

- Waldorf, Rhineland-Palatinate
- Waldorf, a district in the town of Bornheim (Rheinland), North Rhine-Westphalia
- Walldorf, a town in Baden-Württemberg

United States

- Waldorf, Maryland
- Waldorf, Minnesota

== Hotels and restaurants ==
- Waldorf Hotel (disambiguation), hotels named Waldorf
  - Waldorf-Astoria (1893–1929), the original Waldorf Astoria in New York
  - Waldorf Astoria New York, in New York
  - Waldorf-Astoria (disambiguation), other Waldorf-Astorias
  - The Waldorf Hilton, London
- Waldorf Astoria Hotels & Resorts, a luxury hotel brand
- Waldorf System or Waldorf Lunch, a chain of lunch rooms (1903-1970s)

== Education ==
- Waldorf education, an educational philosophy
- Waldorf College, Forest City, Iowa, United States

== Entertainment and culture ==
- Waldorf Music, manufacturer of music synthesizers in Germany
- Waldorf (novel), by James Goldman
- Waldorf salad, made with apples and nuts
- Novello Theatre, theatre located in City of Westminster, England that was originally named the Waldorf Theatre

=== Fictional characters ===
- Blair Waldorf, character in the popular novel series Gossip Girl, written by Cecily von Ziegesar
- Statler and Waldorf, a pair of Muppets
