= Burbo Bank =

Burbo Bank may refer to:

- Burbo Bank Offshore Wind Farm, in the Mersey estuary
- SS Burbo Bank, a cargo ship built in 1902
