= SF Film =

SF Film may refer to:

- SF Film (Danish company), a Danish film distributor, e.g. The Journals of Knud Rasmussen
- SF Film Finland, a Finnish film distributor
- SF Studios, a Swedish film production company
- Science fiction film
