= Waldorf Hotel =

Waldorf Hotel may refer to:

- The Waldorf Hotel, the original section of the Waldorf–Astoria (1893–1929) in New York
  - Waldorf Astoria New York, its successor, on Fifth Avenue at 33rd Street
- The original name of The Waldorf Hilton, London, England
- Waldorf Hotel (Vancouver), British Columbia, Canada
- Waldorf Hotel (Andover, South Dakota), United States
- Waldorf Hotel (Fargo, North Dakota), United States

== See also ==
- Waldorf–Astoria (disambiguation)
- Waldorf (disambiguation)
