= Astoria Cinemas =

Swedish cinema chain

Astoria Cinemas AB
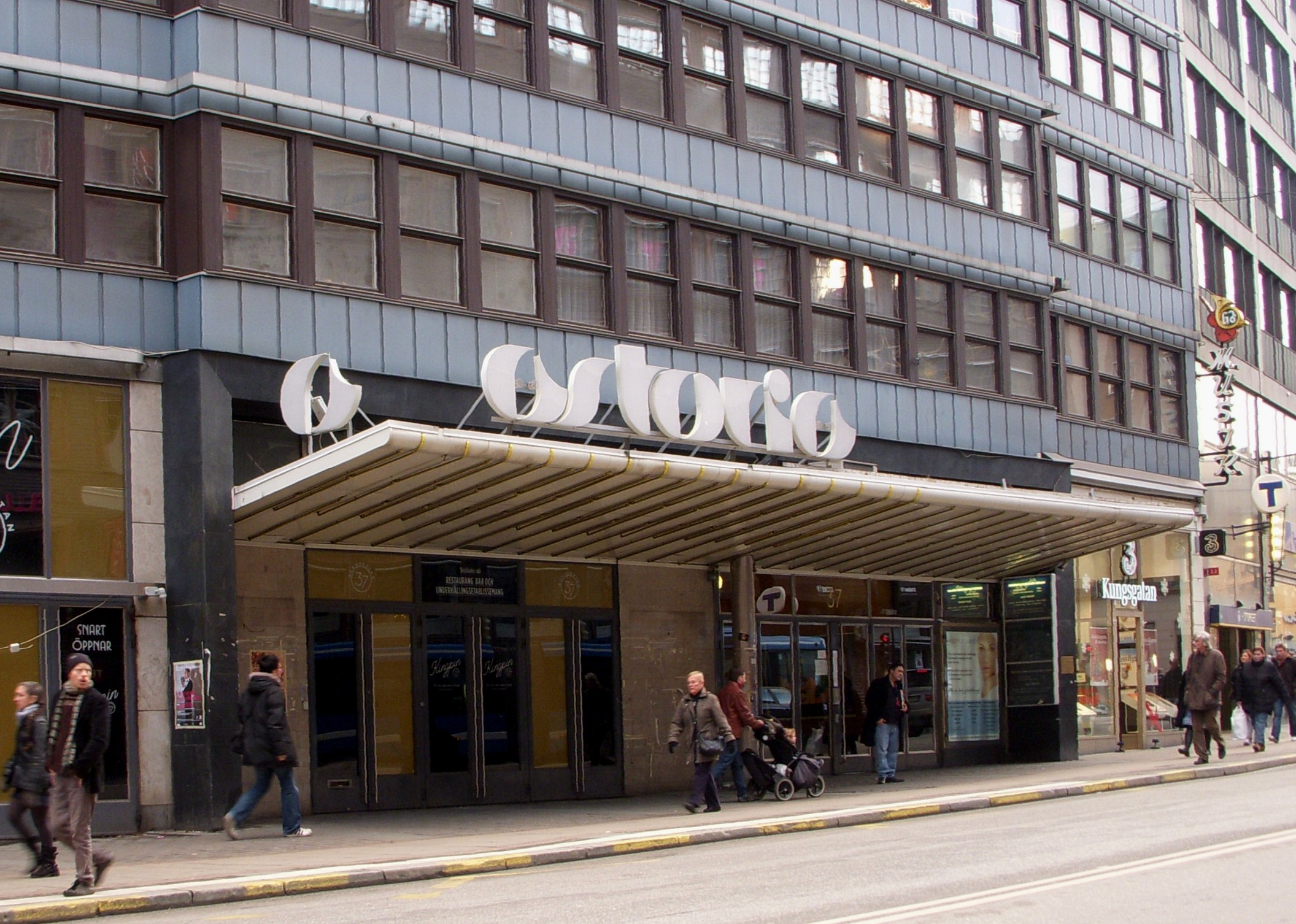
- Company type: Private limited company
- Predecessor: Sandrew Metronome's cinemas
- Founded: April 29, 1997; 28 years ago
- Defunct: October 3, 2007
- Fate: Bankruptcy. Some cinemas were sold to SF Bio and Svenska Bio.
- Area served: Sweden
- Owner: Triangelfilm Atlantic Film S/S Falden

Astoria Cinemas was a cinema chain that was started by people from Triangelfilm, Atlantic Film and S/S Falden which in April 2005 bought Sandrew Metronome's cinemas in Sweden. Sandrew's cinemas in Sweden has been for sale since August 2004 because their owner (Schibsted) was displeased with declining revenues. A bid from SF Bio in December 2004 was stopped by the Swedish Competition Authority.

== See also ==
- Astoria, Stockholm
