= USS Astoria =

Four ships of the United States Navy have been named Astoria, after the town of Astoria, Oregon.

- USS Astoria (1867), was laid down in 1867, but renamed Omaha prior to her commissioning.
- USS Astoria (AK-8), a cargo ship, was seized by US Customs when the US entered World War I.
- USS Astoria (CA-34), was a heavy cruiser commissioned in 1934 and lost in the Battle of Savo Island in 1942.
- USS Astoria (CL-90), was a light cruiser commissioned in 1944, and decommissioned in 1949.
