= Astoria station =

Astoria station may refer to:

== Transportation ==
- Astoria metro station, a Budapest Metro station
- Astoria Boulevard station, a New York City Subway station
- Astoria–Ditmars Boulevard station, a New York City Subway station

== Other ==
- Coast Guard Air Station Astoria, in Warrenton, Oregon

== See also ==
- Astoria (disambiguation)
