= Astoria Grande =

Cruise ship built in 1996

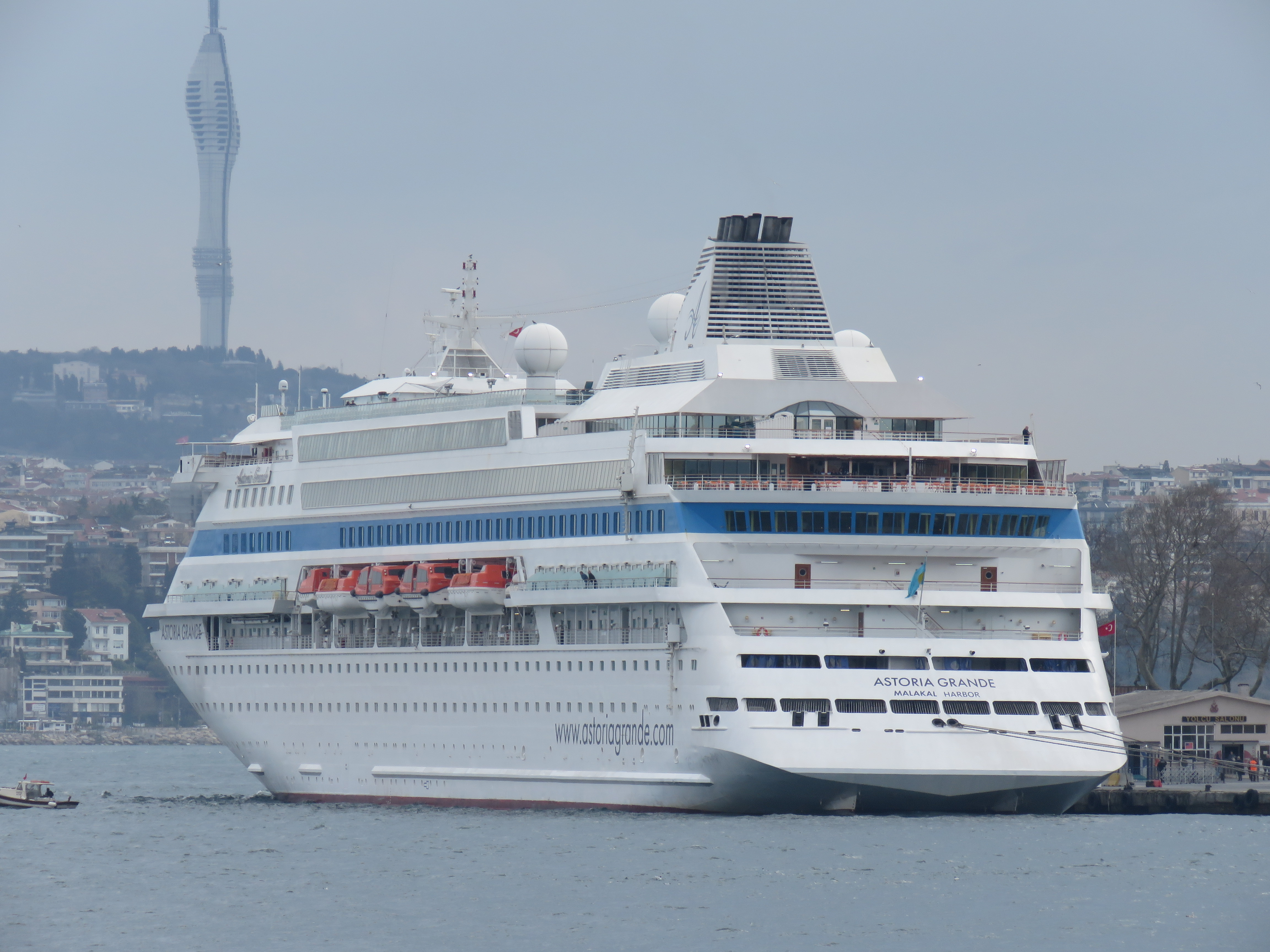
- Astoria Grande, in Istanbul (March 2024)

History
- Name: AIDA (1996–2001); AIDAcara (2001–2021); Astoria Grande (2021–present)
- Owner: AIDA Cruises (1996–2021); Aquilon Shipping Co. (2021–2022); Goodwin Shipping Ltd. (2022–present)
- Operator: AIDA Cruises (1996–2021); Aquilon Shipping Co. (2021–present)
- Port of registry: 1996–1997: Rostock Germany; 1997–1999: Monrovia Liberia; 1999–2000: Rostock Germany; 2000–2002: Monrovia Liberia; 2002–2004: London United Kingdom; 2004–2021: Genoa Italy; 2021–2022: Panama Panama; 2022–present: Malakal Harbour Palau
- Builder: Kvaerner Masa-Yards Turku New Shipyard (Finland)
- Cost: DM 300 million
- Yard number: 1337
- Laid down: 11 September 1995
- Launched: 16 February 1996
- Completed: 4 June 1996
- Maiden voyage: 1996
- In service: 1996–present
- Refit: 2005
- Identification: Call sign: T8A3965; IMO number: 9112789; MMSI number: 511100759
- Status: In service

General characteristics
- Tonnage: 38,557 GT
- Length: 193.30 m (634.2 ft)
- Beam: 27.58 m (90.5 ft)
- Draft: 6.19 m (20.3 ft)
- Decks: 11 total, 9 passenger
- Installed power: 2 diesel-electric motors (21,720 kW)
- Speed: 20 knots (37 km/h; 23 mph)
- Capacity: 1,186 passengers
- Crew: 360 crew

Astoria Grande is a cruise ship which entered service as Aida in 1996 in the fleet of German cruise company, AIDA Cruises. She was their first cruise ship and in 2001 became AIDAcara. In 2021 the ship was sold to a Russian company and renamed Astoria Grande.

== History ==
The ship was built, at a cost of DM 300 million, by Kvaerner Masa-Yards at their Turku New Shipyard in (Finland), for Deutsche Seetouristik/Arkona Reisen, Rostock, as a "Clubschiff" (Club Ship), She was launched in 1996 and entered service in June that year with the name Aida.

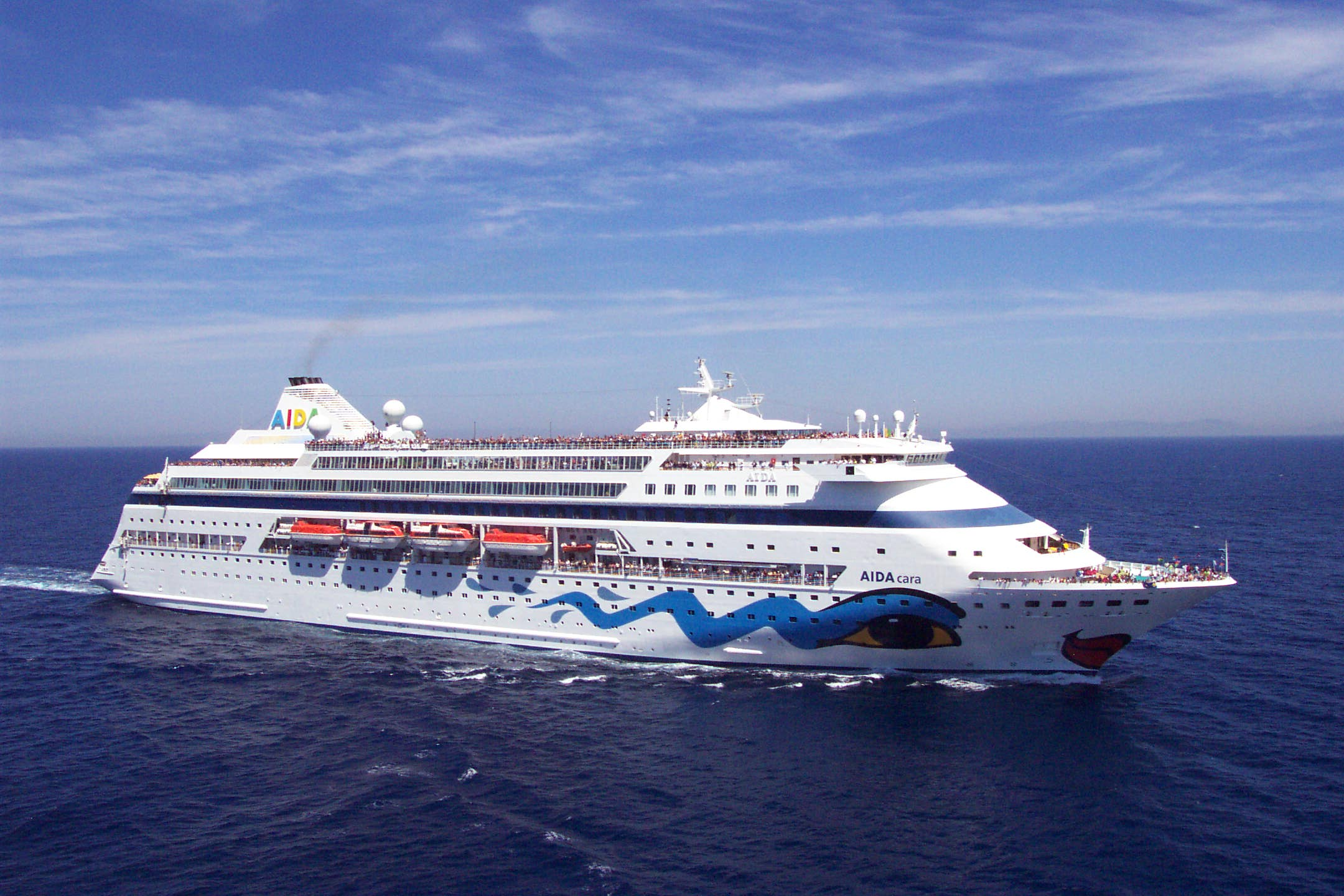
AIDAcara Before receiving balcony cabins.

When P&O Cruises purchased a controlling stake in Arkona Reisen in 1999, they transferred the ship, and it became part of the new Aida Cruises fleet. She was renamed Aidacara (styled AIDAcara) in 2001, after two sister ships entered operation as AIDAvita and AIDAaura. In 2005, the vessel underwent a refit, which increased the number of cabins.

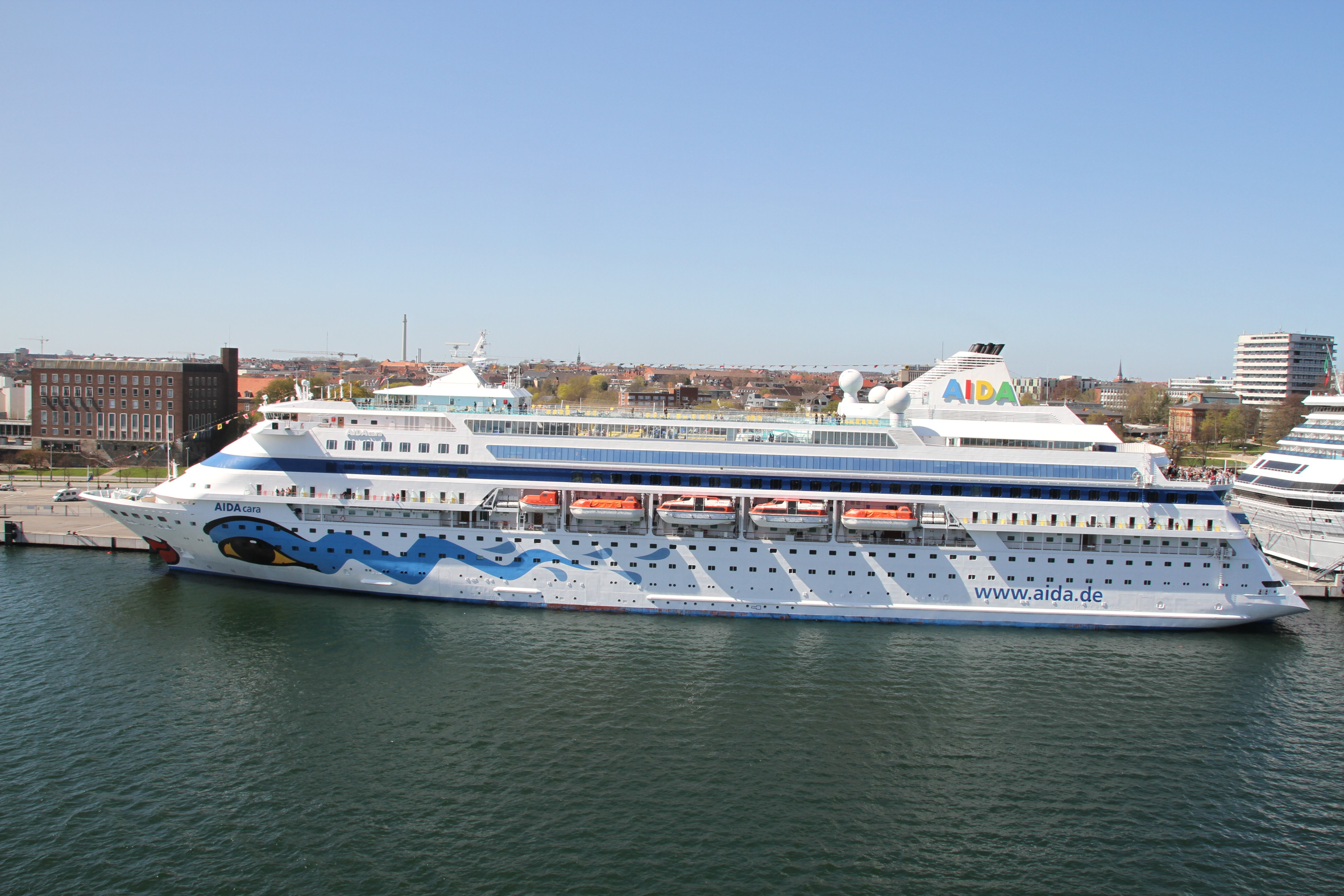
AIDAcara

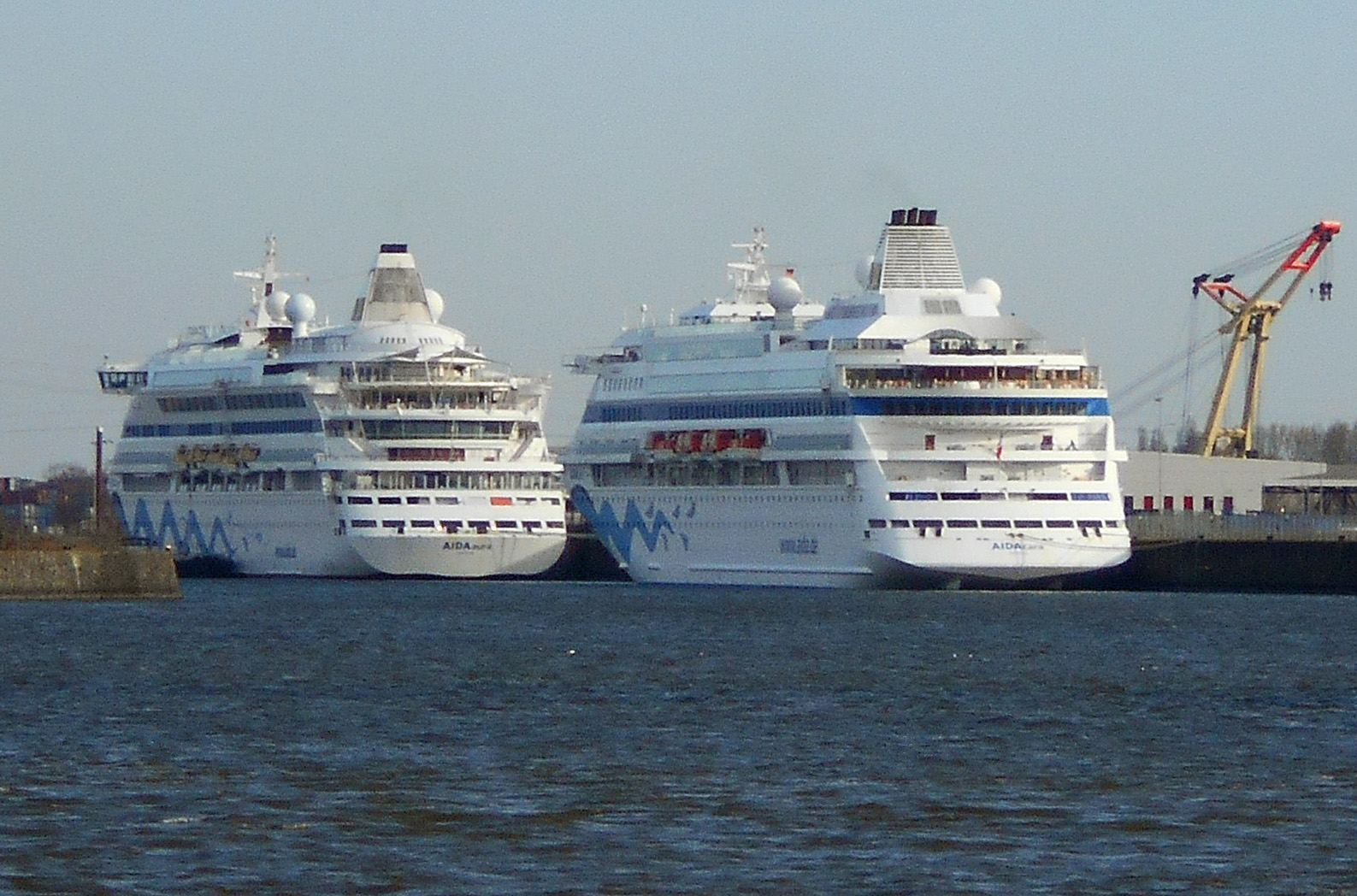
AIDAcara and AIDAaura in Hamburg 2020

In 2021 the ship was sold to a Russian company and renamed Astoria Grande.

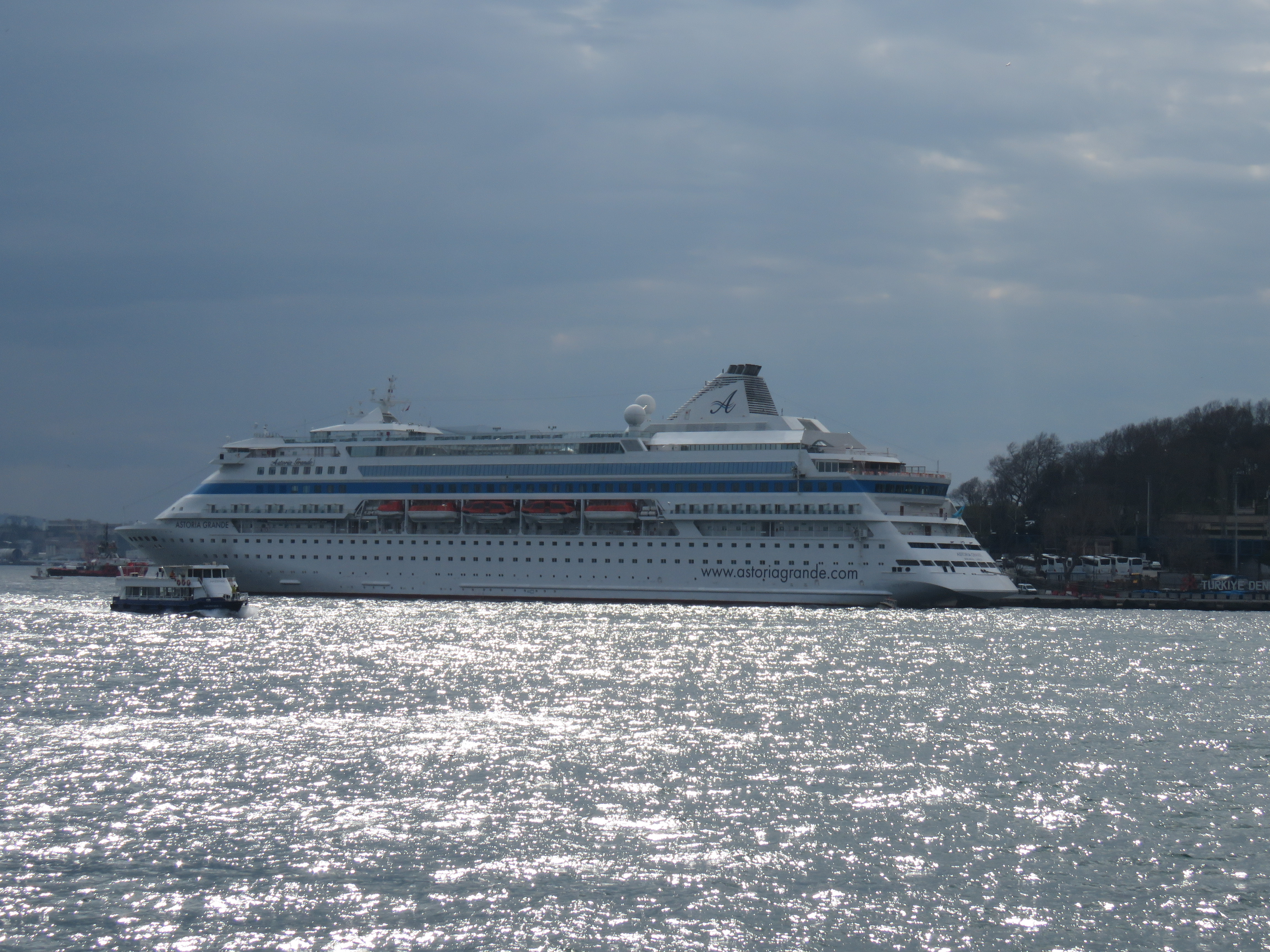
Astoria Grande in Istanbul.

=== 2023 Port of Batumi Incident ===
In the summer of 2023, the ship began sailing from the Russian port of Sochi. On Monday, July 31, 2023, Russian passengers disembarking the ship in the Georgian port city of Batumi were met by protesters who threw eggs at the ship, waved Georgian, Ukrainian and EU flags and chanted anti-Putin slogans. The ship left the port on the evening of August 1, ahead of its scheduled departure. Although the ship had been scheduled to dock at Batumi every two weeks, following the incident the ship's webpage had dropped Batumi from its itinerary.
