= Astoria Palace Hotel =

Hotel in Copacabana, Rio de Janeiro

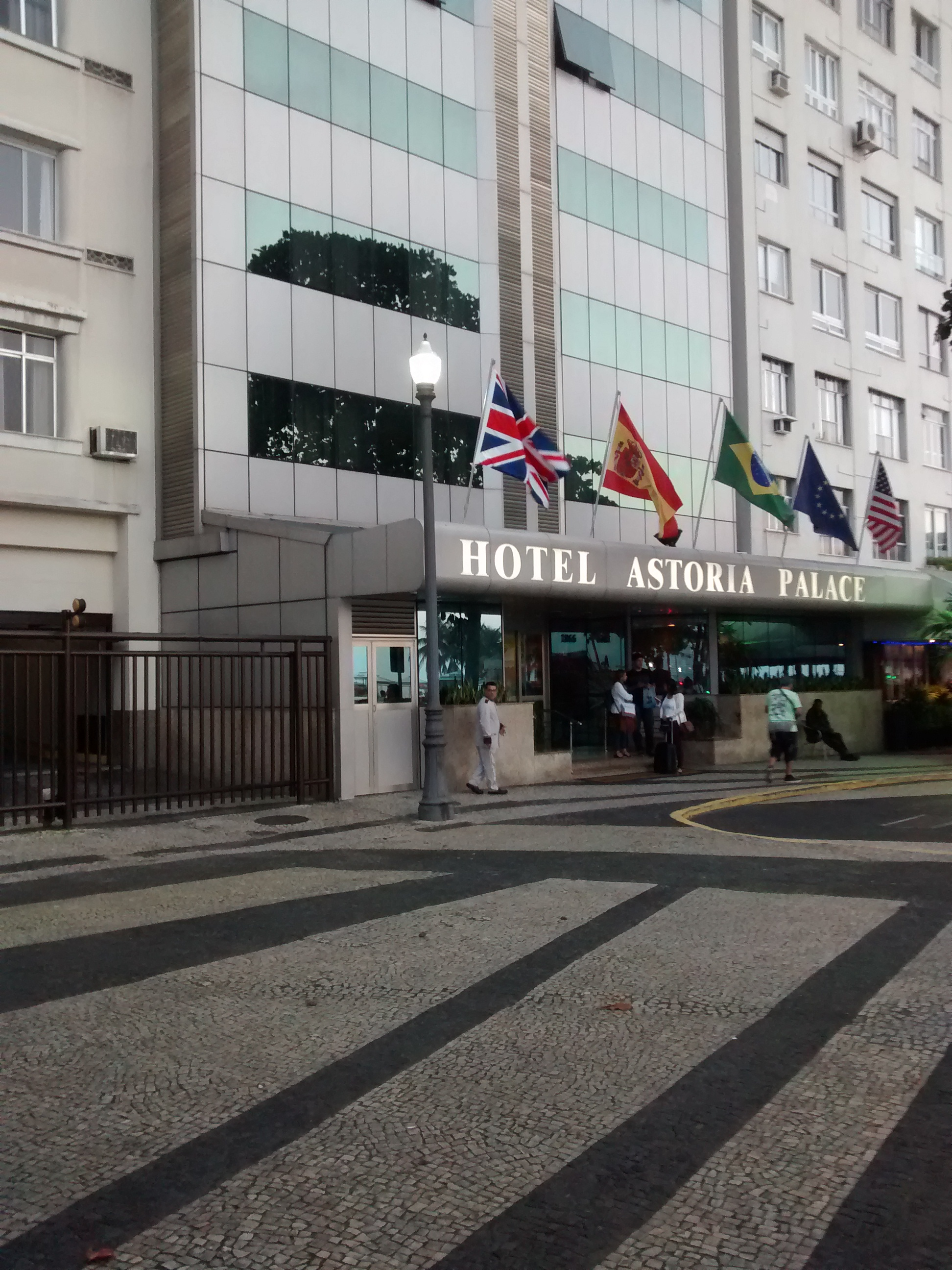
- Entrance of Astoria Palace Hotel

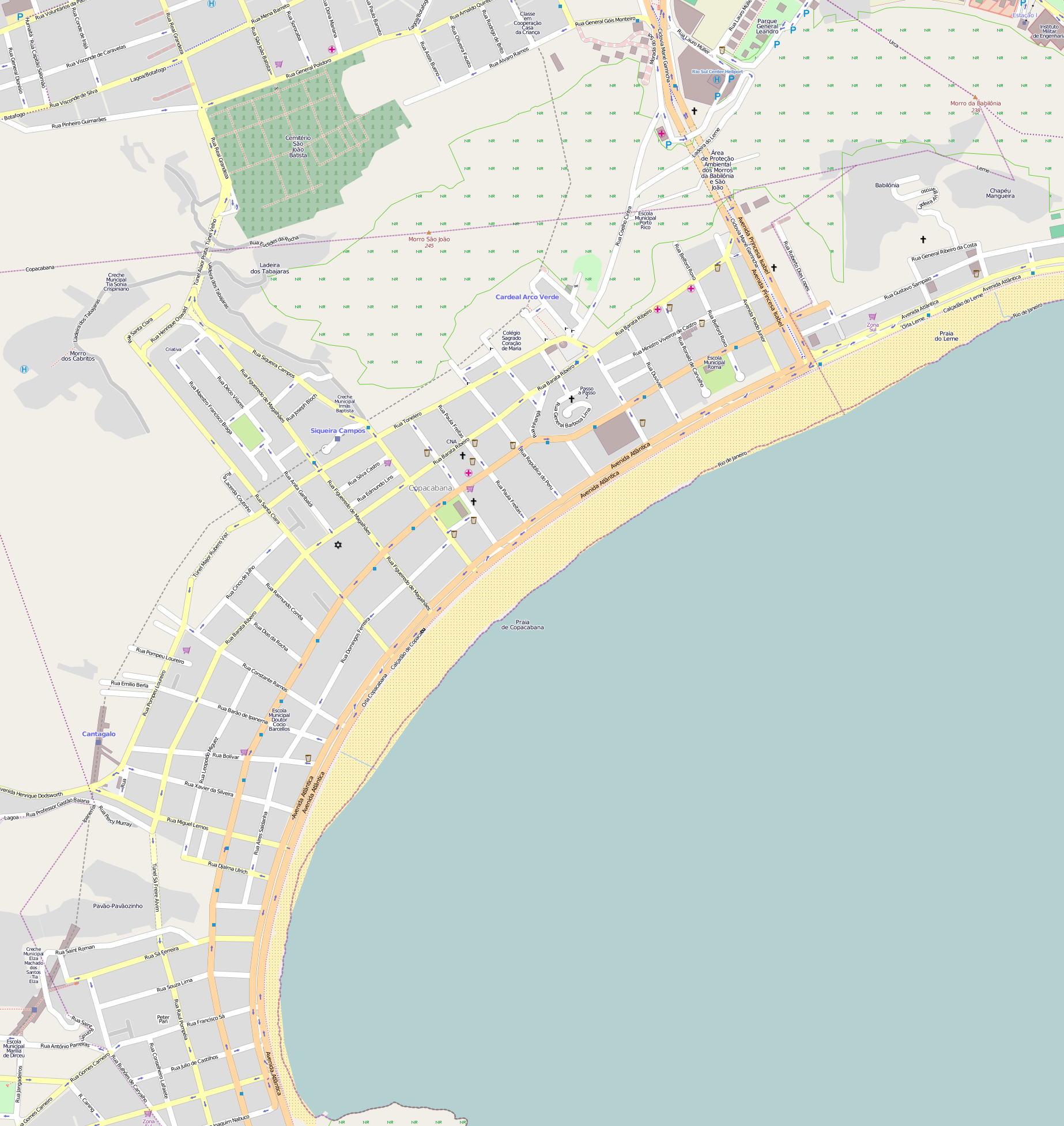
- Location within Copacabana, Rio de Janeiro

General information
- Location: Copacabana, Rio de Janeiro, Brazil, Av. Atlantica, 1866
- Coordinates: 22°58′5″S 43°10′50″W

Other information
- Number of rooms: 115

Website
- Official Site

The Astoria Palace Hotel is a hotel in Copacabana, Rio de Janeiro, Brazil. It faces the Copacabana Beach and is located just metres west of the Copacabana Palace Hotel. It is one of the newest hotels in the area and has 115 rooms.
