= Astoria Hotels and Resorts =

Hotel chain in the Philippines

Astoria
- Astoria Hotels and Resorts
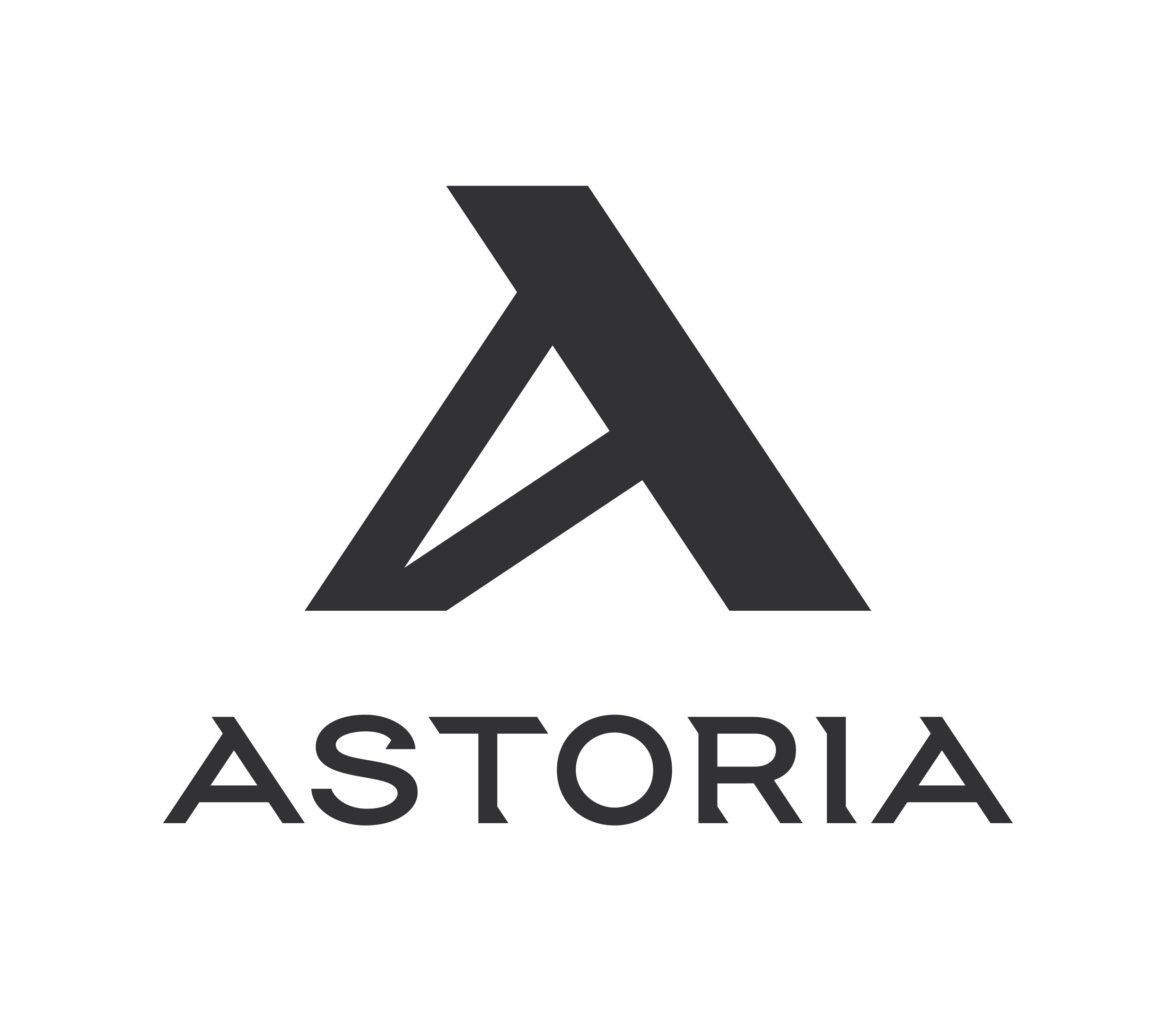
- Established: 2001; 25 years ago
- Founders: Jeffrey and Vivian Ng
- Headquarters: 15 J. Escriva Drive,
- Location: Pasig, Metro Manila, Philippines
- Coordinates: 14°34′43.4″N 121°03′35.4″E
- Parent organization: Millennium Properties & Brokerage, Inc.
- Website: astoriahotelsandresorts.com

Astoria Hotels and Resorts is a Philippine hospitality chain established in 2001.

== Branches ==
=== Metro Manila ===
==== Astoria Plaza ====
Built in 2001, the Astoria Plaza is located at the Ortigas Center.

It has a Japanese restaurant, Minami Saki. and a buffet restaurant outlet Café Astoria. Near the hotel stands Chardonnay Events Hall, an events hall.

==== Astoria Greenbelt ====
Opened in March 2015, Astoria Greenbelt became the sixth Astoria property. The boutique hotel sits along Arnaiz Avenue at the Makati Business District. The hotel has an executive boardroom and its own restaurant, Tableau.

=== Other hotels ===
==== Astoria Boracay ====
Built in 2010, Astoria Boracay is situated at Station 1 of Boracay island in Malay, Aklan. It has 71 suites and rooms designed by Atelier Almario and Gallego & Associates.

It has a restaurant named White Café. Astoria Boracay has amenities which include function rooms with a seating capacity of up to 80 people, a pool, a garden area, and a fitness gym.

==== Astoria Bohol ====
Astoria Bohol was built in 2012 at Baclayon, Bohol for members of Astoria Vacation and Leisure Club. It has 8 suites. The hotel also has a library, an infinity pool, and a nearby trekking trail.

Astoria Bohol Lantawan, a nearby establishment has 2 villas which can accommodate a total of 12 guests. The property also includes an infinity pool.

==== Astoria Palawan ====
The Astoria Palawan was built in 2024 in Puerto Princesa. It is the biggest property of Astoria Hotels and Resorts as of 2024. The resort provides 4 different accommodation sites around the property and has 3 restaurant outlets. Amenities include 3 pools, a gym, gaming rooms, karaoke, and spa. It also has Palawan Waterpark By Astoria, which Astoria bills as the biggest water park in the city.

Astoria Palawan also has Mangrove Conference & Convention Center By Astoria. Mangrove, as it is known, is a function hall with 439 square meters (4,730 sq ft) of space with a seating capacity of 450 persons.

==== Astoria Current ====
Astoria Current was built in 2015, five years after Astoria Boracay's launch. Located at Station 3 on Boracay island of Malay, Aklan, the hotel has 5 different room types and two different pools. Other amenities include a fitness gym, sauna, and spa. It also has two function rooms, with the Annex Building D Function Room and its 140-person seating capacity, and the other, the Sales Deck Function Room, which can seat 100 people.

== Charity ==
#SikapPinoy is a program of Astoria for indigents living in the rural areas of the Philippines teaching them financial literacy and livelihood skills.
