= Astoria High School =

Astoria High School may refer to:

- Astoria High School (Illinois), Astoria, Illinois
- Astoria High School (Oregon), Astoria, Oregon
