= SF Studios =

Swedish film studio

AB Svensk Filmindustri
- Trade name: SF Studios
- Type: Subsidiary
- Industry: Film, television
- Predecessor: AB Svenska Biografteatern; Filmindustri AB Skandia
- Founded: 27 December 1919; 106 years ago by merger (as Svensk Filmindustri)
- Headquarters: Stockholm, Sweden
- Area served: Worldwide
- Key people: Iréne Lindblad (CEO)
- Products: Motion pictures, television series
- Parent: Bonnier Entertainment
- Subsidiaries: SF Studios Danmark; SF Studios Norge; SF Studios Finland
- Website: sfstudios.se

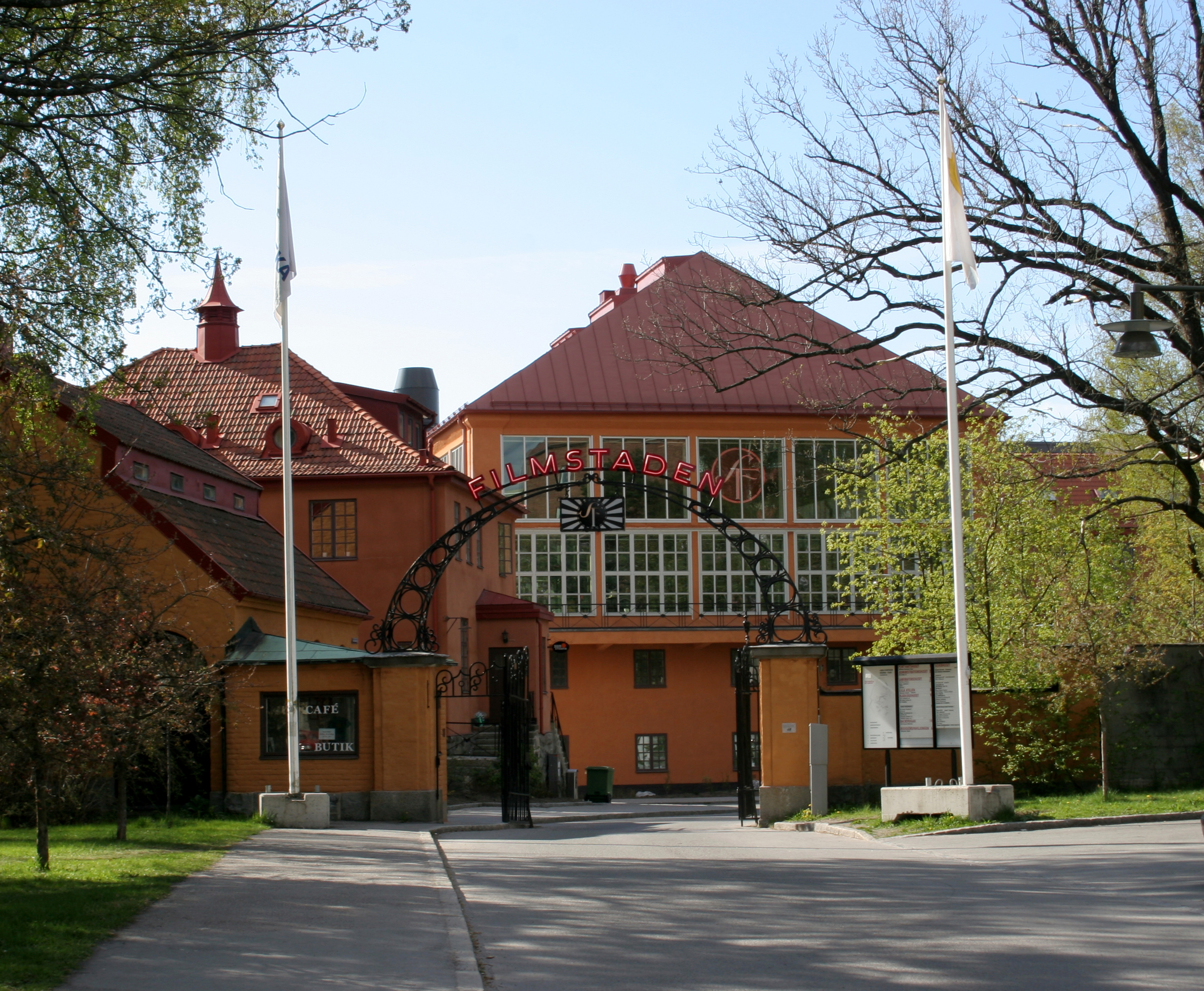
The gate to SF's former headquarters at Filmstaden in Solna outside of Stockholm

SF Studios is a Swedish film production and distribution company and brand of movie theater market chains (both Swedish and international, including American) with headquarters in Stockholm and local offices in Oslo, Copenhagen, Helsinki and London. The studio is owned by the Nordic media conglomerate Bonnier Group. The largest film studio in Sweden, it was established on 27 December 1919 as Aktiebolaget Svensk Filmindustri, which means Swedish Film Industry in Swedish (AB Svensk Filmindustri) or Svensk Filmindustri (SF), and adopted its current name in 2016.

== History ==
SF Studios was founded in 1919 through a merger between AB Svenska Biografteatern and Skandia Filmbyrå AB. From 1942 to 1961, Carl-Anders Dymling was the company's president. In 1946, the melodrama Sunshine Follows Rain was released, earning the studio's largest profit of the sound era. SF produced most of the films made by Ingmar Bergman, as well as a long list of films by other filmmakers such as Mauritz Stiller, Victor Sjöström, Carl Theodor Dreyer, Bo Widerberg, Lasse Hallström and Bille August. The majority of film adaptations of the works by children's author Astrid Lindgren have been produced by SF.

More recently, SF Studios has produced the Academy Award-nominated film A Man Called Ove. The studio produces film and TV-series and has production divisions in Sweden, Denmark, Norway and since 2017 in the United Kingdom. In 2020, SF Studios released its first international film production Horizon Line.

SF also distributes foreign films in the Nordic countries and has deals with Warner Bros., Metro-Goldwyn-Mayer, Sony Pictures and STX Entertainment in the United States and StudioCanal in France.

SF was owned by Hufvudstaden AB from 1970 until 1973, when it was sold to the newspaper firm Dagens Nyheter. Since 1983, SF has been owned by the Bonnier Group. In 1998, SF was divided into two separate companies, the production and distribution company AB Svensk Filmindustri and the cinema chain SF Bio (later Filmstaden)

In 2020, SF started distributing Warner Bros. Home Entertainment's titles in Scandinavia after their deal with 20th Century Home Entertainment expired, and signed agreements with Universal Pictures Home Entertainment and Sony Pictures Home Entertainment to handle titles across the Nordic and Baltic regions. A year later, they signed a deal with Paramount Home Entertainment to distribute their releases in Scandinavia.

In mid-2022, SF signed a deal with Walt Disney Studios Home Entertainment for physical distribution of their titles in Scandinavia.

== See also ==
- Filmstaden
- SF Anytime
- SF Bio
- SF Film

== Bibliography ==
- Gunnar Iverson, Astrid Soderbergh Widding & Tytti Soila. Nordic National Cinemas. Routledge, 2005.
