= Astoria Line =

Astoria Line may refer to:

- BMT Astoria Line, a rapid transit line of the New York City Subway
- Astoria Line (Manhattan) a streetcar line in Manhattan
