= Filmstaden (cinema chain) =

Swedish cinema chain

Filmstaden AB
- Formerly: Svensk Filmindustri (1920-1998); SF Bio AB (1998-2018)
- Type: Subsidiary
- Industry: Cinema
- Predecessor: Svensk Filmindustri
- Founded: 1920; 106 years ago (as Filmstaden); 1998; 28 years ago (as SF Bio)
- Area served: Sweden
- Key people: Ramon Biarnes (CEO)
- Brands: Filmstaden, Biolabbet
- Parent: Nordic Cinema Group
- Subsidiaries: Svenska Bio (50%) Västerås Biografer, AB Svensk Filmindustri & Co (50%)
- Website: https://filmstaden.se

Filmstaden AB (formerly SF Bio AB) is Sweden's largest cinema chain, and was founded in 1998 after Svensk Filmindustri was split into SF and SF Bio. The company is owned by the European group Odeon Cinemas Group, which has been owned by the world's largest cinema group, the American AMC Theatres since 2017.

On October 26, 2018, the prominent Swedish cinema chain SF Bio officially debuted its new visual identity and introductory vignette. marked the beginning of the brand's formal transition and renaming to Filmstaden AB to coincided with the grand opening of the new Filmstaden theater in Helsingborg due to the sale to AMC Theatres, in 2017.
