= USS Astoria (AK-8) =

Cargo ship of the United States Navy

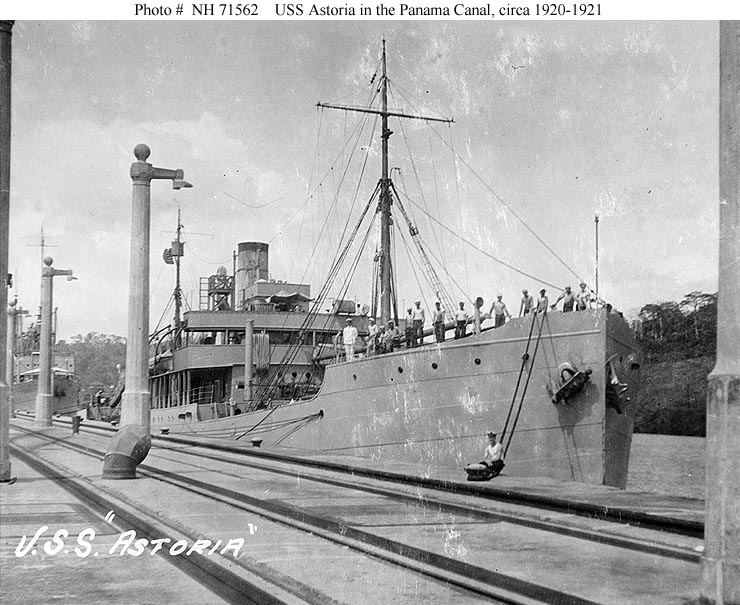
- USS Astoria (ID # 2005, later AK-8) In the Panama Canal, circa January 1920 or November 1921.

History

United Kingdom
- Name: Burbo Bank
- Owner: Fenwick Shipping Co., Ltd.
- Builder: John Blumer and Co., Sunderland, England
- Launched: 9 April 1902
- Out of service: 1914

German Empire
- Name: Frieda Leonhardt
- Owner: Leonhardt & Blumberg of Hamburg, Empire of Germany
- Acquired: 1914
- Fate: Seized by United States Customs at Jacksonville, Florida, acquired by the Navy 22 May 1917

United States
- Name: USS Astoria
- Namesake: Astoria, Oregon
- Acquired: 22 May 1917
- Commissioned: 15 November 1917, as USS Astoria (ID 2005)
- Decommissioned: 20 April 1921
- Reclassified: 17 July 1920, USS Astoria (AK-8)
- Identification: Hull symbol:ID-2005; Hull symbol:AK-8
- Fate: sold 20 December 1921; ran aground 5 May 1943 on Bantam Rock, Sheepscot Bar, ME and foundered

General characteristics
- Type: Cargo ship
- Displacement: 7,150 long tons (7,265 t)
- Beam: 46 ft (14 m)
- Draft: 20 ft 1 in (6.12 m)
- Propulsion: 1 × triple expansion steam engine; 1 × shaft
- Speed: 9.5 knots (17.6 km/h; 10.9 mph)
- Complement: 131 officers and enlisted
- Armament: 4 × 3 in (76 mm) guns; 2 × machine guns

The USS Astoria (SP-2005/AK-8) was a steel-hulled, coal-burning steam cargo ship of the United States Navy.

== Service history ==
=== In commercial service, 1902–1917 ===
The ship was constructed in 1902 by J. Blumer & Co., Sunderland, England, as SS Burbo Bank for the Fenwick Shipping Co., Ltd., was acquired by Leonhardt & Blumberg of Hamburg, Germany shortly before the beginning of World War I, and was renamed SS Frieda Leonhardt. After the outbreak of hostilities, she took refuge in Jacksonville, Florida, and remained there until the United States entered the war against Germany in the spring of 1917.

=== Seized by the United States, 1917 ===
She was then seized by United States Customs officials and was turned over to the United States Shipping Board (USSB). Transferred to the Navy by an executive order dated 22 May 1917, the freighter was moved to Charleston, South Carolina, to be prepared in the navy yard there for naval service. Renamed Astoria (SP-2005), she completed conversion late in 1917 and was commissioned on 15 November 1917.

=== US Navy service, 1917–1921 ===
Assigned to the Naval Overseas Transportation Service, Astoria departed Charleston on 23 November for a voyage to Gulfport, Mississippi, and back; reentered Charleston on 19 December; and remained until the last day of the year when she got underway for Hampton Roads, Virginia. The ship loaded a cargo of Army supplies, put to sea on 26 January 1918, and reached the French coast early in February. On 15 February – while anchored in port at Brest, France – Astoria was rammed by the French ship SS La Drome and suffered damage which required several weeks of repairs before she could resume action.

On 10 May, the ship was assigned duty as a coal carrier for the Army. In that capacity, she shuttled between Cardiff, Wales, and the French ports of Brest, Saint-Nazaire, and La Pallice for the remainder of the war and into 1919. After a stop at Queenstown, Ireland, between 2 and 22 February, she got underway for the United States and operated along the east coast until April 1919 when she began one more round-trip voyage to France. Upon her return, she resumed cargo-carrying operations out of Norfolk and continued that role through the end of 1919. She stood out of Norfolk, on 5 January 1920, and steamed through the Panama Canal to the west coast. During her ten months of operations with the Pacific Fleet, she was classified AK-8 on 17 July 1920. On 11 November, the ship headed back toward the east coast.

=== Decommissioning, sale, and later career ===
Astoria was decommissioned at Boston, Massachusetts, on 20 April 1921; and she was sold on 20 December 1921 to Mr. Richard T. Green of Chelsea, Massachusetts. Thereafter, the ship remained active in merchant service – under the names Astoria and, later, Hartwelson – for more than two decades. As Astoria, she ran aground in Grays Harbor, Washington, on 2 May 1927 and was abandoned by her crew, but she later was refloated, repaired, and returned to service. On 5 May 1943, as Hartwelson, she ran aground on Bantam Rock, Sheepscot Bar, Maine, and foundered.
