= Waldorf-Astoria (disambiguation) =

Waldorf Astoria New York is a historic Manhattan hotel built in 1931.

Waldorf-Astoria may also refer to:

- Waldorf-Astoria (1893–1929), the predecessor of the current Waldorf Astoria New York
- Waldorf Astoria Hotels & Resorts, a hospitality hotel management firm
- Waldorf Astoria Berlin, a hotel in Germany
- Waldorf Astoria Chicago, a hotel in the United States
- Waldorf Astoria Edinburgh - The Caledonian, a hotel in Scotland
- Waldorf-Astoria Hotel and Residence Tower, a proposed but cancelled Chicago skyscraper
- Waldorf Astoria Las Vegas, a hotel in the United States
- Waldorf Astoria Miami, an under-construction skyscraper in the United States
- Waldorf Astoria Washington DC, which opened in 2022 in the Old Post Office building
- Waldorf-Astoria Cigar Company
- Waldorf-Astoria-Zigarettenfabrik (Cigarette factory), a former German tobacco company

== See also ==
- Waldorf Hotel (disambiguation)
- Waldorf education
- Waldorf salad
- William Waldorf Astor, hotel businessman for whom the hotel chain name was derived, great grandson of John Jacob Astor, born in Walldorf (now Germany), the first multi-millionaire in the United States.
- FC Astoria Walldorf, a German association football club
